= Deputy Chief of the Air Staff (United Kingdom) =

Senior appointment in the Royal Air Force

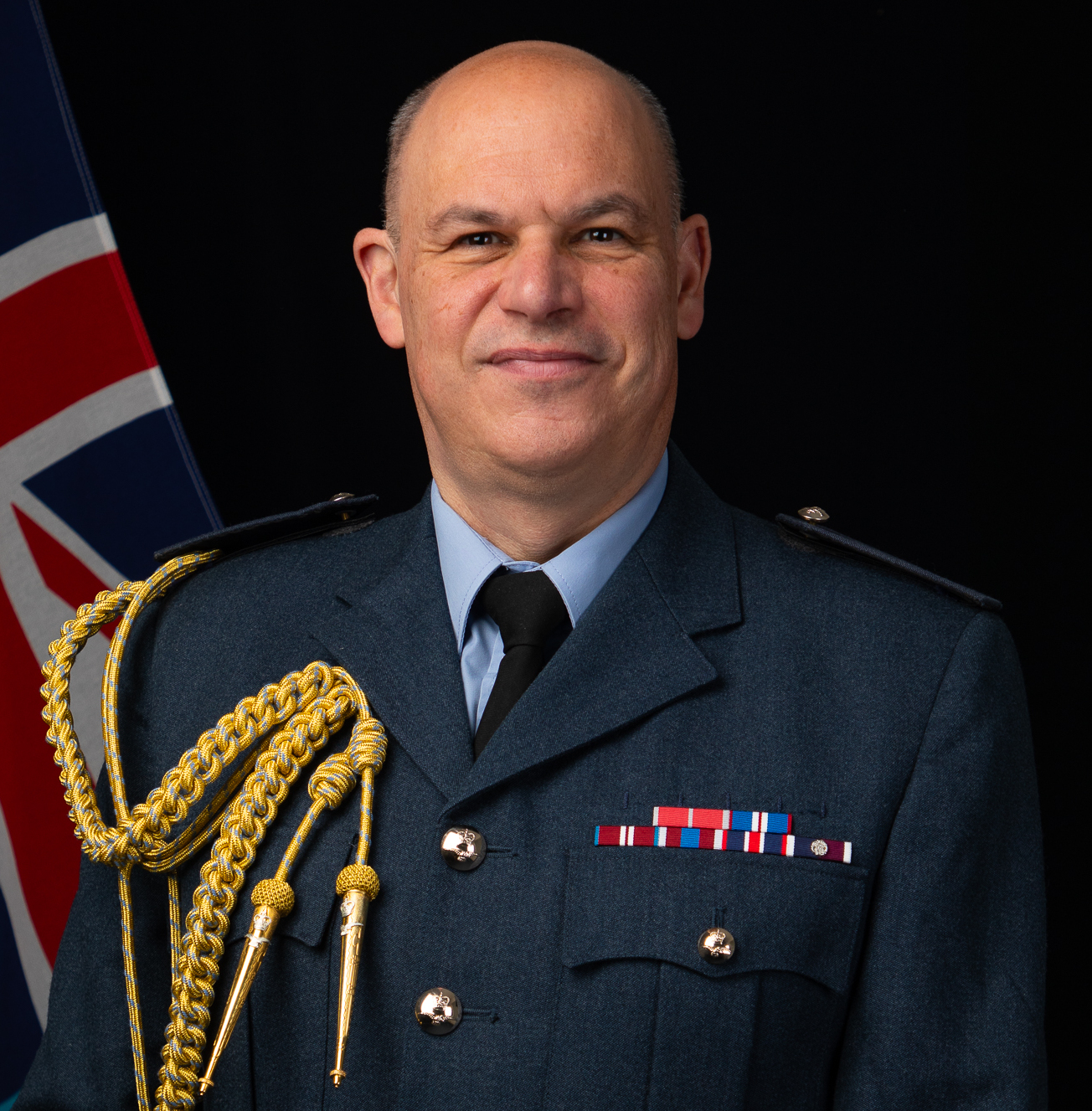
- Incumbent; Air Marshal Paul Lloyd since September 2023
- Royal Air Force
- Style: Air Marshal
- Abbreviation: DCAS
- Member of: Air Force Board
- Reports to: Chief of the Air Staff
- Appointer: The King
- Website: Official Website

The Deputy Chief of the Air Staff (DCAS) is a senior appointment in the Royal Air Force. The incumbent is the deputy to the Chief of the Air Staff. The post existed from 1918 to 1969, and from 2023 to present. The Deputy Chief of the Air Staff, formerly the Deputy Commander Capability, is responsible for the strategic planning and delivery of all aspects of Royal Air Force capability, including people, equipment, infrastructure, and training. The appointee is a Member of the United Kingdom's Air Force Board as the Air Member for Personnel and Capability due to their position.

The current Deputy Chief of the Air Staff is Air Marshal Paul Lloyd.

== History ==
The post was created on 3 January 1918 as part of the preliminary work before the creation of the RAF and the incumbent sat on the Air Council. However, with the establishment of the RAF on 1 April 1918, the Deputy Chief of the Air Staff was removed from the Air Council. From the mid-1920s to 1938, the Deputy Chief of the Air Staff was double-hatted as the RAF's Director of Operations and Intelligence. In 1930, when Trenchard stepped down as Chief of the Air Staff, the Deputy Chief of the Air Staff was once again appointed to the Air Council. The responsibilities on the Air Force Board were split differently from 1967 until the merger of Personnel and Training Command with Strike Command to form RAF Air Command on 1 April 2007. This appointment is currently held concurrently with the Air Member for Personnel.

== List of post holders ==
Holders of the post included:

Deputy Chief of the Air Staff

- 3 January 1918 Major General Mark Kerr
- 1 April 1918 Brigadier General Robert Marsland Groves
- 12 August 1918 Brigadier General Oliver Swann
- February 1919 Brigadier General Robert Marsland Groves (Also Director of Operations and Intelligence)
- 8 September 1919 Air Commodore John Miles Steel (Also Director of Operations and Intelligence)
- 12 April 1926 Air Commodore Cyril Newall (Also Director of Operations and Intelligence)
- 6 February 1931 Air Commodore Charles Burnett (Also Director of Operations and Intelligence)
- 1 February 1933 Air Vice-Marshal Edgar Ludlow-Hewitt (Also Director of Operations and Intelligence)
- 26 January 1935 Air Vice-Marshal Christopher Courtney (Also Director of Operations and Intelligence)
- 25 January 1937 Air Vice-Marshal Richard Peirse (Also Director of Operations and Intelligence)
- 22 April 1940 Air Vice-Marshal Sholto Douglas
- 25 November 1940 Air Vice-Marshal Arthur Harris
- 1 June 1941 Air Vice-Marshal Norman Bottomley (from 3 May 1942 to 30 July 1943 the post was titled Assistant Chief of the Air Staff (Operations))
- September 1945 Air Marshal Sir Albert Durston
- 4 February 1948 Air Marshal Sir Hugh Walmsley
- 1 March 1950 Air Chief Marshal Sir Arthur Sanders
- 17 March 1952 Air Chief Marshal Sir John Baker
- 1 November 1952 Air Marshal Sir Ronald Ivelaw-Chapman
- 9 November 1953 Air Marshal Sir Thomas Pike
- 4 July 1956 Air Marshal Sir Geoffrey Tuttle
- 15 November 1959 Air Marshal Sir Charles Elworthy
- 18 July 1960 Air Marshal Sir Ronald Lees
- June 1963 Air Marshal Sir Christopher Hartley
- 1 April 1966 Air Marshal Sir Reginald Emson
- 30 January 1967 Air Marshal Sir Peter Wykeham

Deputy Commanders-in-Chief (Capability)

- Air Marshal Stephen Dalton, 1 May 2007 to 31 March 2009
- Air Marshal Simon Bryant, 1 April 2009 to 17 June 2010
- Air Marshal Andrew Pulford, 1 September 2010 to 2012

Deputy Commanders (Capability)

- Air Marshal Sir Andrew Pulford, 2012 to 3 May 2013
- Air Marshal Sir Barry North, 3 May 2013 to May 2016
- Air Marshal Sean Reynolds, May 2016 to August 2018
- Air Marshal Michael Wigston, August 2018 to May 2019
- Air Marshal Andrew Turner, May 2019 to April 2022
- Air Marshal Sir Richard Knighton, May 2022 to May 2023

Deputy Chief of the Air Staff

- Air Marshal Richard Maddison, May 2023 to September 2023
- Air Marshal Paul Lloyd, September 2023 to present

== See also ==
- Air and Space Commander
