= Air Board =

Air Board may refer to:

- Air Board (Australia), the controlling body of the Royal Australian Air Force from 1921 to 1976
- Air Board (Canada), Canada's first governing body for aviation from 1919 to 1923
- Air Board (United Kingdom), 1916-1917

== See also ==
- Air Force Board, UK, from 1964
