= Andrew Turner (RAF officer) =

Senior Royal Air Force officer

Air Marshal Andrew Turner CB CBE CCMI
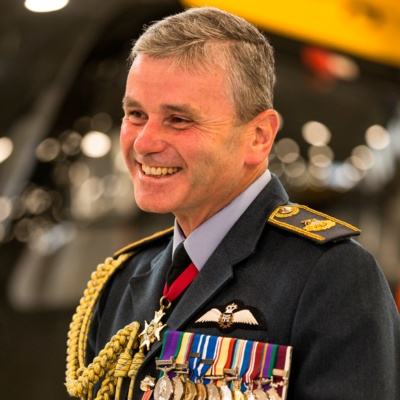
- Air Marshal Turner in 2020
- Born: 1967 (age 58–59)
- Military career
- Allegiance: United Kingdom
- Branch: Royal Air Force
- Service years: 1985–2022
- Rank: Air Marshal
- Commands: No. 22 Group; RAF Odiham; No. 28 Squadron
- Conflicts: The Troubles; Gulf War; Iraq War; War in Afghanistan
- Awards: Companion of the Order of the Bath; Commander of the Order of the British Empire

Air Marshal Andrew Mark Turner, CB, CBE, CCMI (born 1967) is a former senior Royal Air Force officer and helicopter pilot.

== Early life and education ==
Born in 1967, Turner was educated at Kingswood School. He studied at the University of Oxford, University of Exeter, King's College London, Chennai and the Open University: he has a Bachelor of Arts (BA) degree in oceanography and cosmology, a master's degree in international relations, and a master's degree in strategic studies.

== RAF career ==
Turner joined the Royal Air Force in 1985 and was commissioned as an acting pilot officer in 1986, initially training at RAF Gütersloh. He was promoted to pilot officer in 1987, and further promoted to flying officer in 1987, flight lieutenant in 1991, squadron leader in 1995, and wing commander in 2000. He was appointed an Officer of the Order of the British Empire in 2003 in recognition of service in the Iraq War also referred to as Operation Telic.

Turner has commanded No. 28 Squadron RAF and RAF Odiham. In July 2014 he went on to be Air Officer Commanding No. 22 Group RAF and Chief of Staff Training at RAF Air Command, in which capacity he also oversaw safety for the Red Arrows. He was Assistant Chief of the Defence Staff (Operations) from October 2017 to 2019. Turner was promoted to air marshal and appointed as Deputy Commander Capability at RAF Air Command on 23 May 2019.

Turner was appointed as a Commander of the Order of the British Empire in the 2010 New Year Honours, and further appointed a Companion of the Order of the Bath in the 2019 New Year Honours.

Turner retired from the Royal Air Force on 31 August 2022. In 2024, he became a trooper in the Light Cavalry HAC.

He joined the private equity firm NewSpace Capital and led a venture capital fund that would have £50m a year invested in emerging technologies, as well as have supported measures to help RAF reach net zero.

Military offices
| Preceded by Michael Wigston | Deputy Commander Capability, Air Command; 2019–2022 | Succeeded by Sir Richard Knighton |
