= Rich Knighton =

Chief of the UK Defence Staff since 2025

Air Chief Marshal Sir Rich Knighton KCB ADC FREng
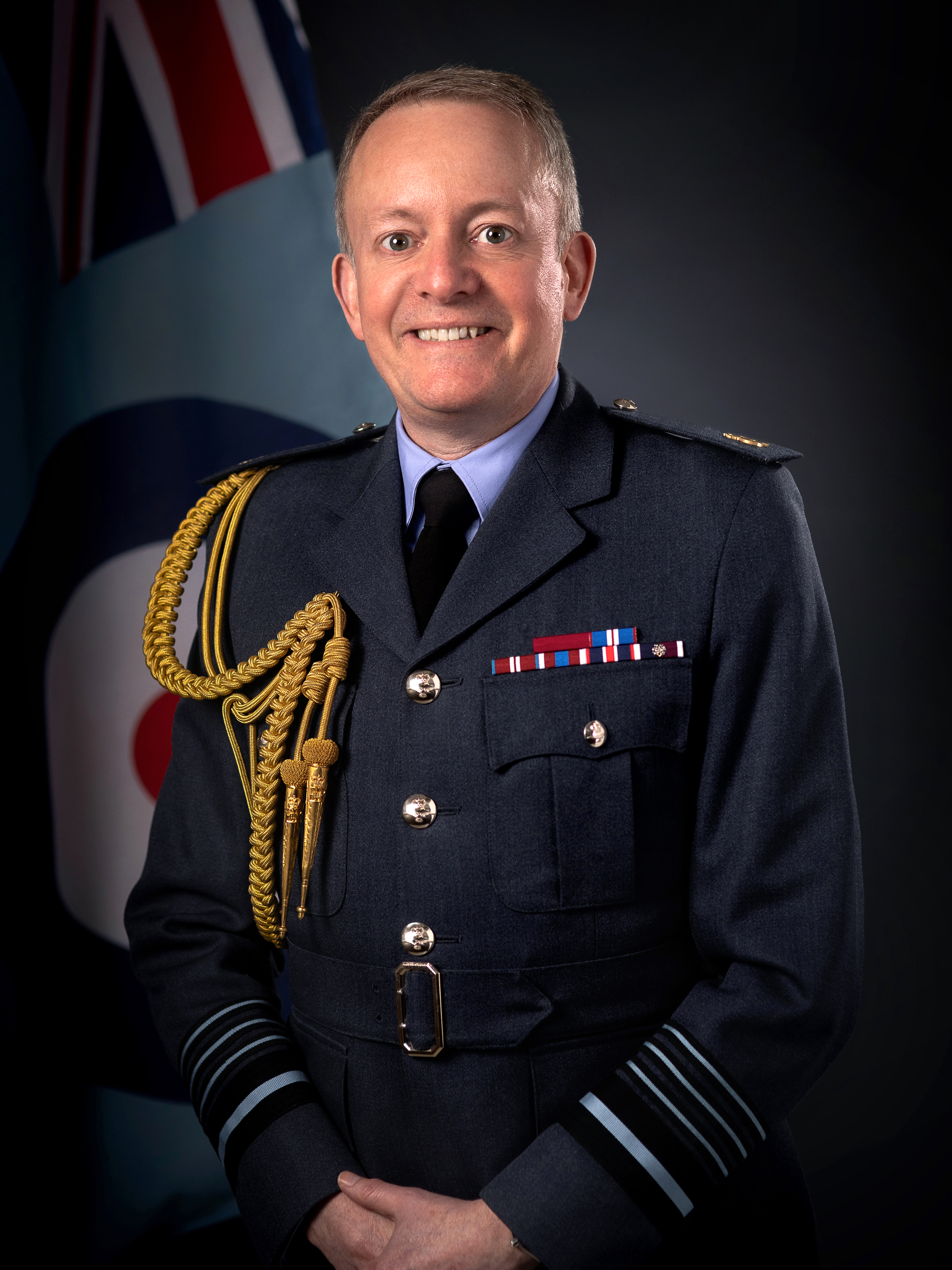
- Knighton in 2023
- Born: Richard John Knighton; 1969 (age 56–57)
- Alma mater: Royal Air Force College Cranwell; Clare College, Cambridge (BA)
- Spouse: Caitlin
- Military career
- Allegiance: United Kingdom
- Branch: Royal Air Force
- Service years: 1988–present
- Rank: Air Chief Marshal
- Commands: Chief of the Defence Staff (2025–); Chief of the Air Staff (2023–2025); Deputy Commander Capability (2022–2023); RAF Wittering (2009–2011)
- Conflicts: Kosovo War
- Awards: Knight Commander of the Order of the Bath

Sir Richard John Knighton (born 1969) is a British engineer and a senior officer in the Royal Air Force (RAF). He has served as Chief of the Defence Staff since September 2025.

Knighton previously served as Assistant Chief of the Air Staff from January 2015 to January 2017, Deputy Chief of Defence Staff (Financial and Military Capability) from December 2018 to May 2022, Deputy Commander Capability at Air Command from May 2022 to May 2023 and Chief of the Air Staff from June 2023 to August 2025. He is notable for being the first Chief of the Air Staff who is not a military pilot or indeed aircrew-qualified.

== Early life ==
Born in 1969, Knighton was educated at Hatton Secondary School in Derbyshire. As a university cadet sponsored by the Royal Air Force, he studied engineering at Clare College, Cambridge where he graduated in 1991 with a first class honours Bachelor of Arts (BA) degree. As per tradition, his BA degree was subsequently promoted to a Master of Arts (MA Cantab) degree.

== Military career ==
Knighton joined the Royal Air Force (RAF) at RAF College Cranwell in 1988. In his early career, he served as an Engineer Officer, and worked on Nimrod, Harrier, and Tornado F3 aircraft, specialising on airframes. In 1998, he was promoted to squadron leader, becoming Senior Engineer Officer on No. 20 Squadron RAF, which was then the Harrier operational conversion unit based at RAF Wittering in Cambridgeshire. He supported the Kosovo War as senior engineering officer in No. 1 Squadron RAF, serving in Italy; this would be his only operational tour. Following this, Knighton moved on to the Tornado as fleet manager for the Tornado Integrated Project Team, which encompassed all variants of Tornado then in RAF service.

In 2003 Knighton was promoted to wing commander whilst attending the Advanced Command and Staff Course. A year later, he returned to the Harrier Force in 2004 as part of the Integrated Project Team based at RAF Wyton; this role was looking at ways to transform how the Harrier was supported by commercial industry partners.

In 2006, he was appointed military assistant to the Deputy Chief of the Defence Staff (Equipment Capability) at the Ministry of Defence in Whitehall, London. Promoted to group captain in mid-2007, he moved to RAF High Wycombe in Buckinghamshire to take post as Deputy Assistant Chief of Staff Strategy and Plans at Air Command. In 2009, Knighton attended the Royal College of Defence Studies, and upon completion, became the Logistics Force Commander for the RAF and Station Commander of RAF Wittering until 2011.

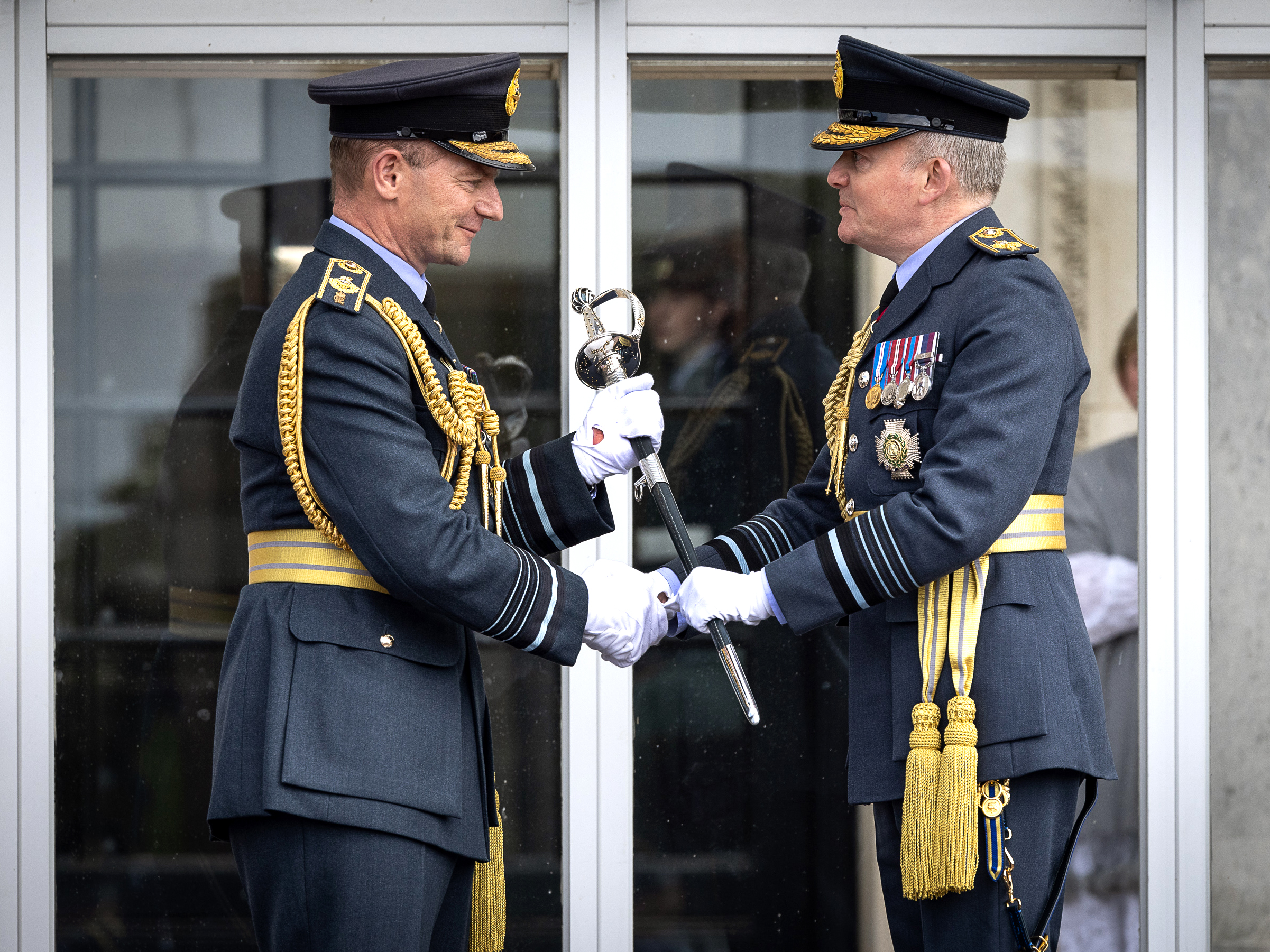
Knighton (right) at the formal handover as Chief of the Air Staff, 2023

In May 2011, with promotion to air commodore, Knighton was appointed Director of Air Plans, subsequently known as Head of Finance and Military Capability (Air), at the Ministry of Defence in Whitehall, before moving on to creating and leading the Future Combat Air System programme. From January 2015 to 2017, he served as the Assistant Chief of the Air Staff. As such, he was a member of the Air Force Board, and also sat on the board of the Civil Aviation Authority as a non-executive member. In July 2016, it was announced that Knighton would become Assistant Chief of the Defence Staff (Capability & Force Design) with effect from January 2017. In the 2017 New Year Honours, Knighton was appointed Companion of the Order of the Bath. In December 2018, he was promoted to air marshal, and appointed as Deputy Chief of Defence Staff (Financial and Military Capability) at the Ministry of Defence. In May 2022, he was appointed Deputy Commander Capability at Air Command at RAF High Wycombe. In the 2022 Birthday Honours, Knighton was promoted to Knight Commander of the Order of the Bath.

In March 2023, Defence Secretary Ben Wallace announced that Knighton would be appointed as Chief of the Air Staff (CAS) in June 2023, in the rank of air chief marshal. Knighton, who joined the RAF as an engineering officer, is significant as the first non-pilot to be appointed to the role of CAS. Knighton took up the post on 2 June 2023.

On 27 June 2025, it was officially announced that Knighton had been appointed the next Chief of the Defence Staff, the professional head of the British Armed Forces, in succession to Admiral Sir Tony Radakin. He took up the post in September 2025.

In a 2026 op-ed, Knighton and his German counterpart Carsten Breuer stated the need to deepen ties between the two militaries and that "Rearmament is not warmongering; it is the responsible action of nations determined to protect their people and preserve peace. Strength deters aggression. Weakness invites it".

In April 2026, Knighton said that the government was working on a new version of the Government War Books, "in a modern context, with a modern society, with modern infrastructure".

=== Wear of orders, decorations, and medals ===
The ribbons worn regularly by Knighton in undress uniform are as follows:

Ribbons of Rich Knighton

	Knight Commander of the Order of the Bath	Queen Elizabeth II Golden Jubilee Medal	
Queen Elizabeth II Diamond Jubilee Medal	Queen Elizabeth II Platinum Jubilee Medal	King Charles III Coronation Medal	Royal Air Force Long Service and Good Conduct Medal with one bar

With medals, Knighton normally wears the breast stars of Order of the Bath.

== Personal life ==
Knighton is married to Caitlin, a partner in a Cambridge-based law firm. The couple share their Cambridge home with their two daughters. Off duty, Knighton is "a below-average sportsman", and a keen skier, and confesses a desire to do more sailing, whilst also keeping current with his private pilots licence.

Military offices
Preceded by Edward Stringer	Assistant Chief of the Air Staff; 2015–2017	Succeeded by Michael Wigston
Preceded by Tim Fraser	Assistant Chief of the Defence Staff (Capability & Force Design); 2017–2018	Succeeded by Robert Magowan
Preceded by Mark Poffley	Deputy Chief of the Defence Staff (Financial and Military Capability); 2018–2022	Succeeded by Robert Magowan
Preceded by Andrew Turner	Deputy Commander Capability, Air Command; 2022–2023	Succeeded by Richard Maddison
Preceded by Sir Michael Wigston	Chief of the Air Staff; 2023–2025	Succeeded by Harv Smyth
Preceded by Sir Tony Radakin	Chief of the Defence Staff; 2025–present	Incumbent
