= Hugh Walmsley =

Royal Air Force Air Marshal (1898-1985)

Sir Hugh Walmsley
- Born: 6 June 1898
- Died: 2 September 1985 (aged 87)
- Military career
- Allegiance: United Kingdom
- Branch: British Army (1915–1918); Royal Air Force (1918–1952)
- Service years: 1915–1952
- Rank: Air Marshal
- Commands: Flying Training Command (1950–1952); RAF India (1946–1947); No. 4 Group (1945–1946); No. 91 Group (1942–1944); No. 6 (Bomber) Group (1942); RAF Scampton (1940–1941); No. 71 Wing (1939–1940); RAF Abingdon (1937–1939); No. 8 Squadron (1935–1937); No. 33 Squadron (1933–1935)
- Conflicts: First World War; Second World War
- Awards: Knight Commander of the Order of the Bath; Knight Commander of the Order of the Indian Empire; Commander of the Order of the British Empire; Military Cross; Distinguished Flying Cross; Mentioned in Despatches (5)

Air Marshal Sir Hugh Sidney Porter Walmsley, KCB, KCIE, CBE, MC, DFC (6 June 1898 – 2 September 1985) was a senior commander in the Royal Air Force during and after the Second World War. He was the final commander of RAF India and the unified Royal Indian Air Force before its division upon India's independence and partition.

== RAF career ==
Educated at Dover College, Walmsley was commissioned into the Loyal North Lancashire Regiment in January 1916 during the First World War. He was seconded to the Royal Flying Corps later that year and received a permanent commission in the Royal Air Force in 1919. He was appointed Officer Commanding No. 33 Squadron in 1933 and Officer Commanding No. 8 Squadron in 1935 before becoming Station Commander at RAF Abingdon in 1937.

He served in the Second World War as Officer Commanding No. 71 Wing and Officer Commanding RAF Scampton before transferring to Headquarters RAF Bomber Command. He continued his war service as Air Officer Commanding No. 6 (Bomber) Group, Air Officer Commanding No. 91 Group and as Senior Air Staff Officer at Headquarters Bomber Command. Finally he was made Air Officer Commanding No. 4 Group in May 1945.

After the War he served with Transport Command in South East Asia before being appointed Air Officer Administration at AHQ India in June 1946. He went on to be Air Officer Commanding-in-Chief at RAF India in November 1946, Deputy Chief of the Air Staff in February 1948 and Air Officer Commanding-in-Chief at Flying Training Command in 1950 before retiring in 1952.

In retirement he became managing director of Air Service Training Limited at Hamble.

Military offices
Preceded by Sir Roderick Carr	Air Officer Commanding-in-Chief, RAF India; 1946–1947	Succeeded by Sir Thomas Elmhirst; Air Officer Commanding, Royal Indian Air Force
Preceded by Sir Albert Durston	Deputy Chief of the Air Staff; 1948–1950	Succeeded by Sir Arthur Sanders
Preceded by Sir Ralph Cochrane	Air Officer Commander-in-Chief Flying Training Command; 1950–1952	Succeeded by Sir Lawrence Pendred
