= Geoffrey Tuttle =

Royal Air Force Air Marshal (1906-1989)

Sir Geoffrey Tuttle
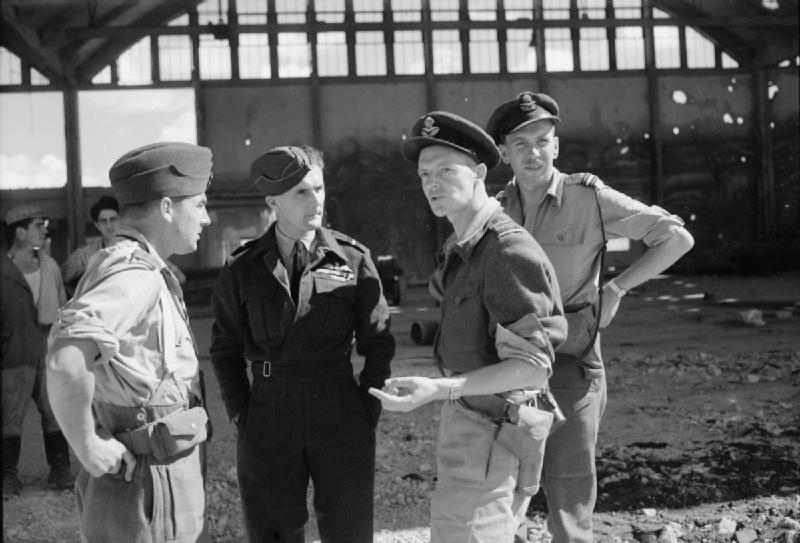
- Air Commodore Tuttle, Air Officer Commanding Air Headquarters Greece (second from left), discusses the security situation at Kalamaki/Hassani airfield with armed RAF officers, c. 1944–45.
- Born: 2 October 1906
- Died: 11 January 1989 (aged 82)
- Military career
- Allegiance: United Kingdom
- Branch: Royal Air Force
- Service years: 1925–1959
- Rank: Air Marshal
- Commands: No. 19 Group; AHQ Greece; No. 324 Wing; No. 1 Photographic Reconnaissance Unit RAF; No. 105 Squadron
- Conflicts: Second World War
- Awards: Knight Commander of the Order of the British Empire; Companion of the Order of the Bath; Distinguished Flying Cross; Mentioned in Despatches (3); Order of the Patriotic War, 2nd Class (USSR); Commander of the Legion of Honour (France); Croix de Guerre (France)

Air Marshal Sir Geoffrey William Tuttle, KBE, CB, DFC, FRAeS (2 October 1906 – 11 January 1989) was a senior Royal Air Force officer who served as Deputy Chief of the Air Staff from 1956 to 1959.

== RAF career ==
Tuttle joined the Royal Air Force in 1925. He was appointed Officer Commanding No. 105 Squadron in 1937. He served in World War II as Commander of the Photographic Reconnaissance Unit and then as Officer Commanding No. 324 Wing before being appointed Senior Air Staff Officer at Headquarters Mediterranean Allied Coastal Air Force and then Air Officer Commanding AHQ Greece. In Greece his initial force consisted of Nos 94, 108, and 221 Squadrons. After the War he became Director of Operational Requirements at the Air Ministry and then Air Officer for Administration at Headquarters RAF Coastal Command. He went on to be Assistant Chief of the Air Staff (Operational Requirements) in 1951, Air Officer Commanding No. 19 Group in 1954 and Deputy Chief of the Air Staff in 1956 before retiring in 1959.

In retirement Tuttle became General Manager at Vickers-Armstrongs (Aviation) Limited.

Military offices
Preceded by Sir Thomas Pike	Deputy Chief of the Air Staff; 1956–1959	Succeeded by Sir Charles Elworthy
