= Chief of the Air Staff (United Kingdom) =

Professional head of the Royal Air Force

- Air Chief Marshal's command flag

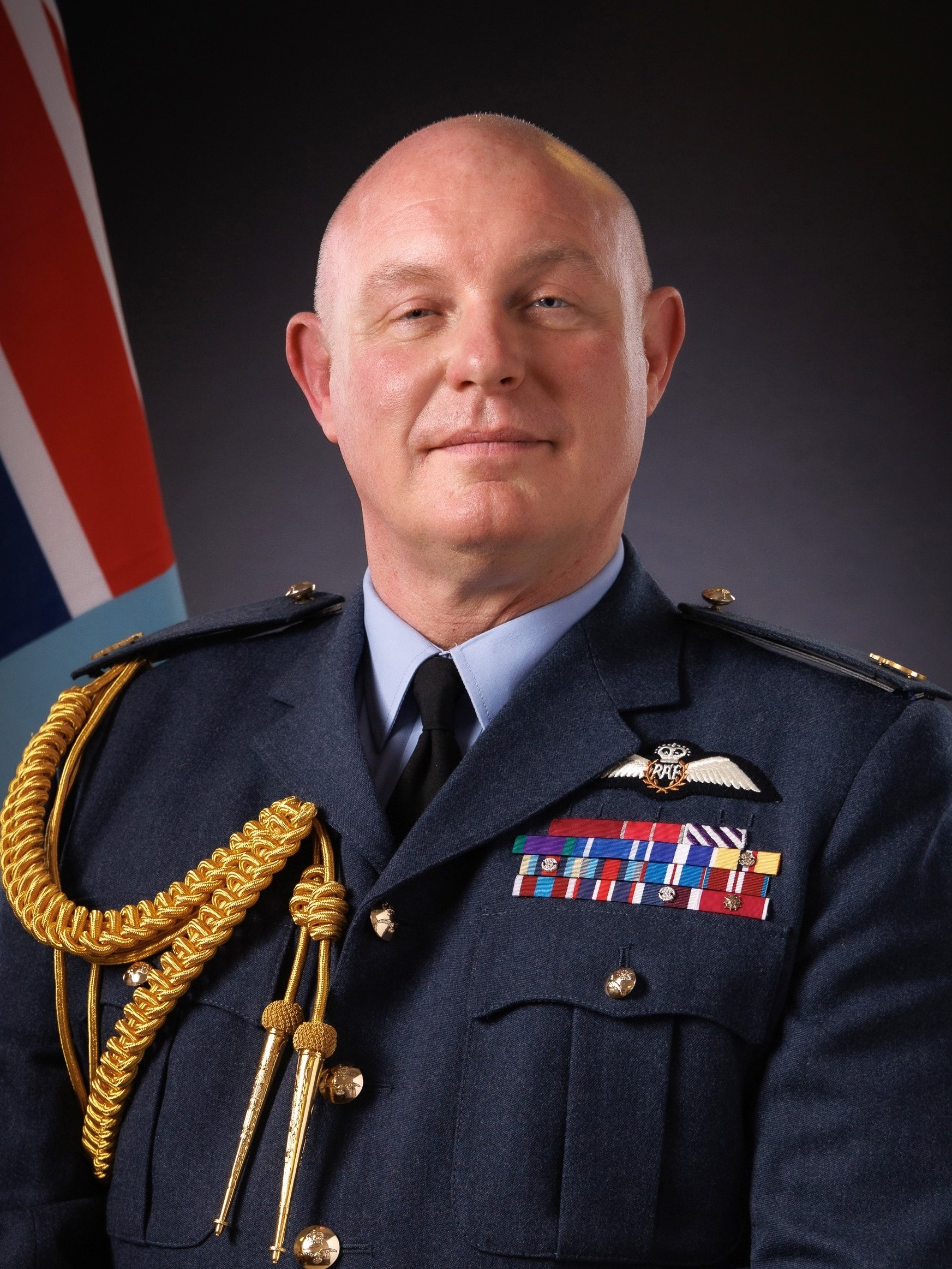
- Incumbent; Air Chief Marshal Sir Harvey Smyth since 29 August 2025
- Ministry of Defence; Royal Air Force
- Style: Air Chief Marshal
- Abbreviation: CAS
- Member of: Defence Council; Air Force Board; Chiefs of Staff Committee
- Reports to: Chief of the Defence Staff
- Nominator: Secretary of State for Defence
- Appointer: Prime Minister; Subject to formal approval by the King-in-Council
- Term length: 3 Years
- Formation: 3 January 1918
- First holder: Major General Sir Hugh Trenchard
- Deputy: Deputy Chief of the Air Staff
- Website: Official website

Chief of the Air Staff (CAS) is the title of the professional head of the Royal Air Force, who is a member of both the Chiefs of Staff Committee and the Air Force Board. The post was created in 1918, with Major General Sir Hugh Trenchard as the first holder. The current and 32nd Chief of the Air Staff is Air Chief Marshal Sir Harvey Smyth, who succeeded Sir Richard Knighton on 29 August 2025.

== Responsibilities ==
As of June 2023, the responsibilities were described as follows: As the RAF progressively adopts responsibility for Air Capability planning and management from MOD Head Office, CAS will be responsible for commissioning RAF equipment, materiel and other support requirements. As a Service Chief of Staff, he has the right of direct access to the Secretary of State and the Prime Minister. CAS chairs the Air Force Board Standing Committee, and is a member of the Defence Council, the Air Force Board, the Armed Forces Committee, the Chiefs' of Staff Committee and the Senior Appointments Committee. Current responsibilities for CAS include:

- Managing the AIR Top-Level Budget to deliver the RAF's Command Plan, in accordance with defence priorities and standing military tasks within the delegated funding;
- Ensuring the long-term health of the service, focusing on professional standards, ethos, welfare, career management and morale;
- Ensuring that the whole force, including civil servants and contractors, plays its part in delivering the required operational effects as components of a single team
- Advising on the development and maintenance of the optimum coherent set of requirements that UK defence requires;
- Providing CDS, MOD and the government with advice and recommendations on the operational employment of the RAF and contributing military experience and knowledge to assist in the development of defence policy.

== History ==
The post of Chief of the Air Staff (CAS) was established in January 1918, just prior to the official formation of the Royal Air Force (RAF), and its first occupant was Major General Sir Hugh Trenchard. Following Trenchard's resignation in March 1918 after disagreements with the first air minister, Lord Rothermere, his rival Major General Sir Frederick Sykes was appointed. For political reasons Trenchard's resignation did not take effect until late April in order that he would be CAS when the RAF was formed. With Winston Churchill's post-war appointment as Secretary of State for War and Air, Sykes was moved sideways to head up the nascent Civil Aviation ministry and Trenchard returned as CAS. In the early 1920s, Trenchard had to fight to keep the RAF from being divided and absorbed back into the Royal Navy and the British Army. After Lord Trenchard retired in 1930 there were still suggestions that the RAF should be broken up, but Trenchard's foundations proved solid.

By the time the Second World War broke out in 1939, the then occupant of the post, Air Chief Marshal Sir Cyril Newall, had a service that had been undergoing the most rapid of expansions during the British rearmament programs of the late 1930s. Newall gave way in 1940 to Air Chief Marshal Sir Charles Portal, who led the service for the rest of the war. Portal was a tireless defender of the RAF and highly capable in administration and strategy. After the war the RAF was reoriented to perform the dual roles of defending the shrinking British Empire and possibly fighting against the Soviet Union in a Warsaw Pact verses NATO war over Germany and the United Kingdom. The Chiefs of the Air Staff of the day had to fight a constant battle to keep the British aircraft industry alive. In the end only minimal success was achieved, with only a rump aviation industrial base left by the 1970s.

The first eight Chiefs of the Air Staff were originally commissioned in the British Army, with four coming from the infantry, two from the artillery and one each from the cavalry and the engineers. Of these both Lord Trenchard and Sir John Salmond each held the post over two separate periods. By the early mid-1950s sufficient time had elapsed for officers originally commissioned in the British air services of the First World War to have risen through the ranks to RAF's senior post; Sir John Slessor had originally served in the Royal Flying Corps while Sir William Dickson was commissioned into the Royal Naval Air Service. In 1956 Sir Dermot Boyle became the first CAS to have originally been commissioned in the RAF.

Until 2023, every occupant of the post originally commissioned in the RAF was a qualified pilot. The first non-pilot to be appointed to the role is Sir Richard Knighton, who joined the RAF as an engineer, and who took up post in June 2023.

Professional heads of the English/British Armed Forces
	Royal Navy	British Army	Royal Air Force	Combined
1645	N/A	Commander-in-Chief of the Forces (1645/60–1904, intermittently)	Not established	
1689	Senior Naval Lord (1689–1771)	Commander-in-Chief of the Forces (1645/60–1904, intermittently)	Not established	
1771	First Naval Lord (1771–1904)	Commander-in-Chief of the Forces (1645/60–1904, intermittently)	Not established	
1904	First Sea Lord (1904–1917)	Chief of the General Staff (1904–1909)	Not established	Inter-service co-ordination was carried out from 1904 by the Committee of Imperial Defence under the chairmanship of the Prime Minister
1909	First Sea Lord (1904–1917)	Chief of the Imperial General Staff (1909–1964)	Not established	Inter-service co-ordination was carried out from 1904 by the Committee of Imperial Defence under the chairmanship of the Prime Minister
1917	First Sea Lord and Chief of the Naval Staff (1917–present)	Chief of the Imperial General Staff (1909–1964)	Not established	Inter-service co-ordination was carried out from 1904 by the Committee of Imperial Defence under the chairmanship of the Prime Minister
1918	First Sea Lord and Chief of the Naval Staff (1917–present)	Chief of the Imperial General Staff (1909–1964)	Chief of the Air Staff (1918–present)	Inter-service co-ordination was carried out from 1904 by the Committee of Imperial Defence under the chairmanship of the Prime Minister
1923	First Sea Lord and Chief of the Naval Staff (1917–present)	Chief of the Imperial General Staff (1909–1964)	Chief of the Air Staff (1918–present)	Chairman of the Chiefs of Staff Committee (1923–1959, held by one of the service heads until 1956)
1959	First Sea Lord and Chief of the Naval Staff (1917–present)	Chief of the Imperial General Staff (1909–1964)	Chief of the Air Staff (1918–present)	Chief of the Defence Staff (1959–present)
1964	First Sea Lord and Chief of the Naval Staff (1917–present)	Chief of the General Staff (1964–present)	Chief of the Air Staff (1918–present)	Chief of the Defence Staff (1959–present)

== Appointees ==
The following list gives details of the chiefs of the air staff from 1918 to the present:

No.	Portrait	Name	Took office	Left office	Time in office	Flying specialism or arm	Ref.
1	Sir Hugh Trenchard	Major-General; Sir Hugh Trenchard (1873–1956)	3 January 1918	13 April 1918	100 days	Infantry (Royal Scots Fusiliers)	
2	Sir Frederick Sykes	Major-General; Sir Frederick Sykes (1877–1954)	13 April 1918	31 March 1919	352 days	Cavalry (15th Hussars)	
(1)	Sir Hugh Trenchard	Marshal of the Royal Air Force; Sir Hugh Trenchard (1873–1956)	31 March 1919	1 January 1930	10 years, 276 days	Infantry (Royal Scots Fusiliers)	
3	Sir John Salmond	Air Chief Marshal; Sir John Salmond (1881–1968)	1 January 1930	1 April 1933	3 years, 90 days	Infantry (King's Own (Royal Lancaster Regiment))	
4	Sir Geoffrey Salmond	Air Chief Marshal; Sir Geoffrey Salmond (1878–1933)	1 April 1933	27 April 1933 †	26 days	Artillery (Royal Artillery)	
—	Sir John Salmond	Marshal of the Royal Air Force; Sir John Salmond (1881–1968); Acting	28 April 1933	22 May 1933	24 days	Infantry (King's Own (Royal Lancaster Regiment))	
5	Sir Edward Ellington	Marshal of the Royal Air Force; Sir Edward Ellington (1877–1967)	22 May 1933	1 September 1937	4 years, 102 days	Artillery (Royal Field Artillery)	
6	Sir Cyril Newall	Marshal of the Royal Air Force; Sir Cyril Newall (1886–1963)	1 September 1937	25 October 1940	3 years, 54 days	Infantry (Royal Warwickshire Regiment and 2nd Gurkha Rifles)	
7	Charles Portal, 1st Viscount Portal of Hungerford	Marshal of the Royal Air Force; Charles Portal, 1st Viscount Portal of Hungerford (1893–1971)	25 October 1940	1 January 1946	5 years, 68 days	Engineers (Royal Engineers)	
8	Arthur Tedder, 1st Baron Tedder	Marshal of the Royal Air Force; Arthur Tedder, 1st Baron Tedder (1890–1967)	1 January 1946	1 January 1950	4 years, 0 days	Infantry (Dorset Regiment)	
9	John Slessor	Marshal of the Royal Air Force; John Slessor (1897–1979)	1 January 1950	1 January 1953	3 years, 0 days	Fighters (biplanes)	
10	Sir William Dickson	Marshal of the Royal Air Force; Sir William Dickson (1898–1987)	1 January 1953	1 January 1956	3 years, 0 days	Naval aviation (biplanes)	
11	Sir Dermot Boyle	Marshal of the Royal Air Force; Sir Dermot Boyle (1904–1993)	1 January 1956	1 January 1960	4 years, 0 days	Fighters (biplanes)	
12	Sir Thomas Pike	Marshal of the Royal Air Force; Sir Thomas Pike (1906–1983)	1 January 1960	1 September 1963	3 years, 243 days	Fighters (biplanes)	
13	Sir Charles Elworthy	Air Chief Marshal; Sir Charles Elworthy (1911–1993)	1 September 1963	1 April 1967	3 years, 212 days	Bombers (biplanes)	
14	Sir John Grandy	Air Chief Marshal; Sir John Grandy (1913–2004)	1 April 1967	1 April 1971	4 years, 0 days	Fighters (biplanes)	
15	Sir Denis Spotswood	Air Chief Marshal; Sir Denis Spotswood (1916–2001)	1 April 1971	1 April 1974	3 years, 0 days	Multirole (monoplane)	
16	Sir Andrew Humphrey	Air Chief Marshal; Sir Andrew Humphrey (1921–1977)	1 April 1974	7 August 1976	2 years, 159 days	Fighters (monoplane)	
17	Sir Neil Cameron	Marshal of the Royal Air Force; Sir Neil Cameron (1920–1985)	7 August 1976	10 August 1977	337 days	Fighters (monoplane)	
18	Sir Michael Beetham	Air Chief Marshal; Sir Michael Beetham (1923–2015)	10 August 1977	15 October 1982	5 years, 66 days	Bombers (monoplane)	
19	Sir Keith Williamson	Air Chief Marshal; Sir Keith Williamson (1928–2018)	15 October 1982	15 October 1985	3 years, 0 days	Fighters (fast jet)	
20	Sir David Craig	Air Chief Marshal; Sir David Craig (born 1929)	15 October 1985	14 November 1988	3 years, 30 days	Fighters (fast jet)	
21	Sir Peter Harding	Air Chief Marshal; Sir Peter Harding (1933–2021)	14 November 1988	6 November 1992	3 years, 358 days	Bombers (fast jet)	
22	Sir Michael Graydon	Air Chief Marshal; Sir Michael Graydon (born 1938)	6 November 1992	10 April 1997	4 years, 155 days	Fighters (fast jet)	
23	Sir Richard Johns	Air Chief Marshal; Sir Richard Johns (born 1939)	10 April 1997	21 April 2000	3 years, 11 days	Fighters (fast jet)	
24	Sir Peter Squire	Air Chief Marshal; Sir Peter Squire (1945–2018)	21 April 2000	1 August 2003	3 years, 102 days	Fighters (fast jet)	
25	Sir Jock Stirrup	Air Chief Marshal; Sir Jock Stirrup (born 1949)	1 August 2003	13 April 2006	2 years, 255 days	Ground attack/ reconnaissance (fast jet)	
26	Sir Glenn Torpy	Air Chief Marshal; Sir Glenn Torpy (born 1953)	13 April 2006	31 July 2009	3 years, 109 days	Ground attack (fast jet)	
27	Sir Stephen Dalton	Air Chief Marshal; Sir Stephen Dalton (born 1954)	31 July 2009	31 July 2013	4 years, 0 days	Ground attack (fast jet)	
28	Sir Andrew Pulford	Air Chief Marshal; Sir Andrew Pulford (born 1958)	31 July 2013	11 July 2016	2 years, 346 days	Helicopters	
29	Sir Stephen Hillier	Air Chief Marshal; Sir Stephen Hillier (born 1962)	11 July 2016	26 July 2019	3 years, 15 days	Ground attack (fast jet)	
30	Sir Michael Wigston	Air Chief Marshal; Sir Michael Wigston (born 1968)	26 July 2019	2 June 2023	3 years, 311 days	Ground attack (fast jet)	
31	Sir Richard Knighton	Air Chief Marshal; Sir Richard Knighton (born 1969)	2 June 2023	29 August 2025	2 years, 88 days	Engineer (aeronautical)	
32	Sir Harvey Smyth	Air Chief Marshal; Sir Harvey Smyth	29 August 2025	Incumbent	1 year, 9 days	Ground attack (fast jet)	

1. The ranks and titles shown are the highest that the officer in question attained during his tour as Chief of the Air Staff. However, in the case where the officer was promoted on the day before he was posted or retired, then the lower rank is shown.

== See also ==
=== Other service chiefs ===
- Chief of the Defence Staff (United Kingdom)
- First Sea Lord / Chief of the Naval Staff
- Chief of the General Staff (United Kingdom)
- Chief of Air Force (Australia) (Between 1922 and 1997, the RAAF's senior officer was known as "Chief of the Air Staff".)
- Chief of the Air Staff (disambiguation)

=== Generally relevant ===
- CAS Air Power Workshop
