= Christopher Hartley (RAF officer) =

Royal Air Force Air Marshal (1913-1998)

Sir Christopher Hartley
- Born: 31 January 1913
- Died: 29 July 1998 (aged 85); Oxford, England
- Military career
- Allegiance: United Kingdom
- Branch: Royal Air Force
- Service years: 1938–1970
- Rank: Air Marshal
- Commands: Deputy Chief of the Air Staff (1963–66); No. 12 Group (1959–60)
- Conflicts: Second World War
- Awards: Knight Commander of the Order of the Bath; Commander of the Order of the British Empire; Distinguished Flying Cross; Air Force Cross; Air Efficiency Award; Mentioned in Despatches (2)

Air Marshal Sir Christopher Harold Hartley KCB, CBE, DFC, AFC, AE (31 January 1913 – 29 July 1998) was a senior Royal Air Force officer who served as Deputy Chief of the Air Staff from 1963 to 1966.

== RAF career ==
Educated at Eton College and Balliol College, Oxford, Hartley joined the Royal Air Force in 1938. He served in World War II as a pilot and then as assistant director of Intelligence (Technical). After the war he became Chief of Staff at Headquarters No 12 (Fighter) Group. He went on to be Air Officer Commanding No. 12 Group in 1959, Assistant Chief of the Air Staff (Operational Requirements) in 1961 and Deputy Chief of the Air Staff in 1963 before being made Controllor of Aircraft in 1967 and retiring in 1970.

== Family ==
The son of noted chemist Harold Hartley, Christopher Hartley married Anne Sitwell in 1937. Following the dissolution of his first marriage, he married Margaret Watson in 1944; they had two sons.

Military offices
Preceded by Sir Ronald Lees	Deputy Chief of the Air Staff; 1963–1966	Succeeded by Sir Reginald Emson
