= Ralph Cochrane =

Royal Air Force Air Chief Marshal (1895-1977)

Sir Ralph Alexander Cochrane
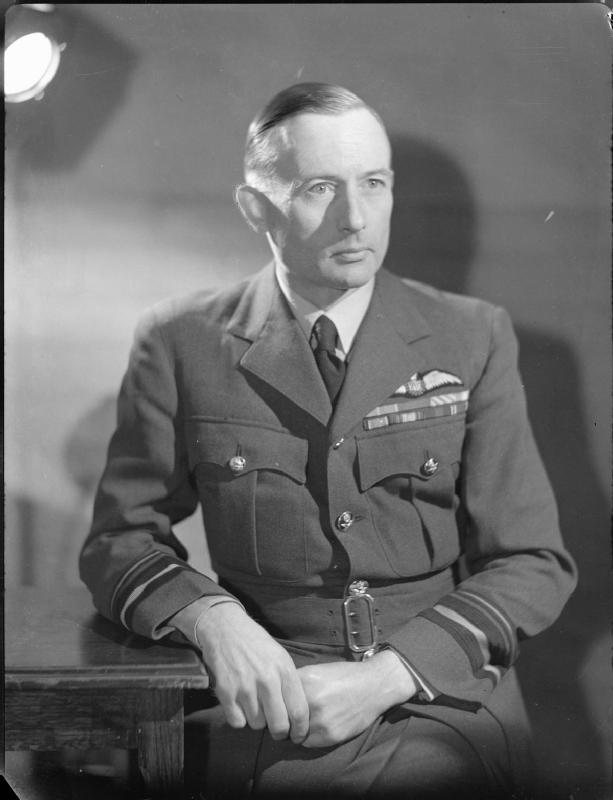
- Air Vice Marshal Cochrane in 1943
- Born: 24 February 1895; Springfield, Fife, Scotland
- Died: 17 December 1977 (aged 82)
- Military career
- Allegiance: United Kingdom
- Branch: Royal Navy (1908–20); Royal Air Force (1920–52)
- Service years: 1912–1952
- Rank: Air Chief Marshal
- Commands: Vice Chief of the Air Staff (1950–52); Flying Training Command (1947–50); Transport Command (1945–47); No. 5 Group (1943–45); No. 3 Group (1942–43); No. 7 Group (1940); RAF Abingdon (1939–40); Chief of the New Zealand Air Staff (1937–39); No. 8 Squadron (1929); No. 3 Squadron (1924–25)
- Conflicts: First World War; Second World War
- Awards: Knight Grand Cross of the Order of the British Empire; Knight Commander of the Order of the Bath; Air Force Cross; Mentioned in Despatches (4)
- Other work: Director of Rolls-Royce Limited

Air Chief Marshal Sir Ralph Alexander Cochrane, GBE, KCB, AFC (24 February 1895 – 17 December 1977) was a Scottish aviator and Royal Air Force officer, perhaps best known for his role in Operation Chastise, the famous "Dambusters" raid.

== Early life ==
Ralph Cochrane was born on 24 February 1895, the youngest son of Thomas Cochrane, 1st Baron Cochrane of Cults, in the Scottish village of Springfield, Fife. To qualify as a naval officer, he joined the Royal Naval College, Osborne in 1908, and the Royal Naval College, Dartmouth, two years later. On 15 September 1912, he was commissioned into the Royal Navy as a midshipman.

== First World War ==
During the First World War, Cochrane served in the Royal Naval Air Service piloting airships. He also completed a tour as a staff officer in the Admiralty's Airship Department.

== Interwar period ==
In January 1920, Cochrane was removed from the Navy List and granted a commission in the Royal Air Force. He served in various staff positions and commanded No. 3 Squadron from 1924 before attending the RAF Staff College and commanding No. 8 Squadron from 1929. He attended the Imperial Defence College in 1935.

At the request of Group Captain T. M. Wilkes, New Zealand Director of Air Services, the Air Ministry sent Cochrane to New Zealand in 1936 as an advisor for the establishment of a military aviation service that would be independent of the army. His report and recommendations was produced at the end of the year and this would lead to the creation of the Royal New Zealand Air Force (RNZAF). He was subsequently invited to lead the raising of the RNZAF and on 1 April 1937, he was appointed Chief of the Air Staff (CAS), the rank of group captain. For the next two years, he worked on the expansion of the RNZAF in line with his recommendations, including the establishment of a flying training school at Wigram Air Base. In March 1939, his term as CAS ended.

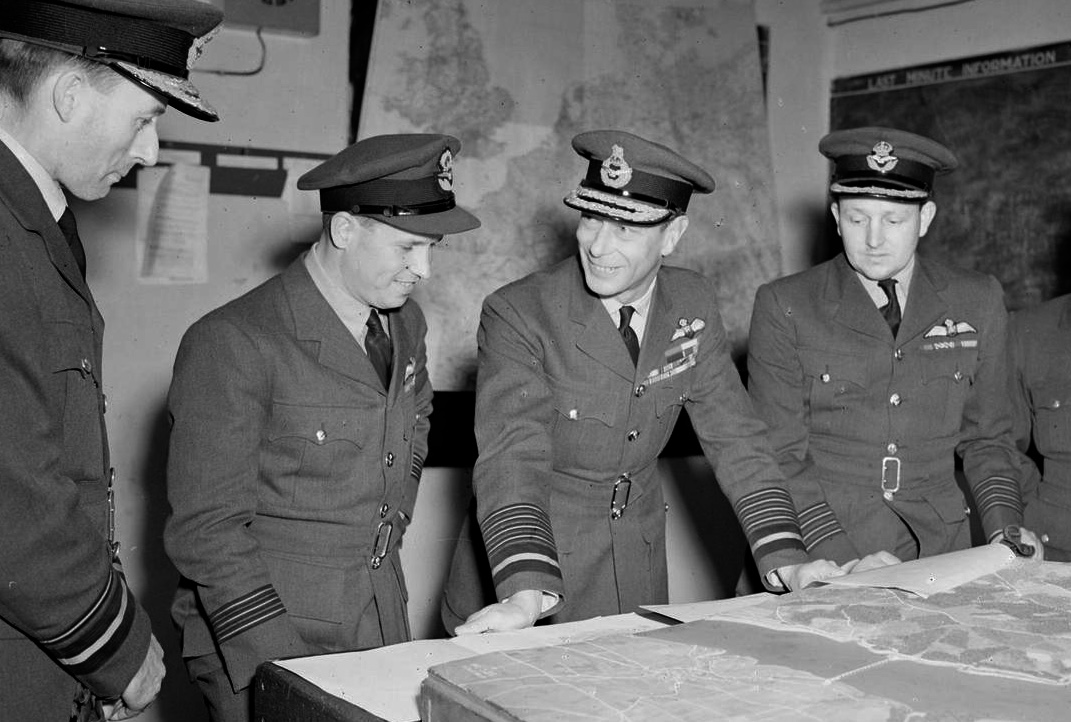
Air Vice-Marshal Ralph Cochrane, Wing Commander Guy Gibson, King George VI and Group Captain John Whitworth discussing the Dambusters Raid in May 1943

== Second World War and the post-war years ==
During the Second World War, Cochrane commanded No. 7 Group from July 1940, No. 3 Group from September 1942 and No. 5 Group from February 1943; all these Groups were in RAF Bomber Command. No. 5 Group became the most efficient and elite Main Force bomber group undertaking spectacular raids. Cochrane commanded the Dam-Busters raid. There was intense, sometimes openly hostile, rivalry between Cochrane and Air Vice Marshal Don Bennett, who saw Cochrane's experimentation with low-level target marking through 617 Squadron in 1944 as a direct threat to his own specialist squadrons' reputation.

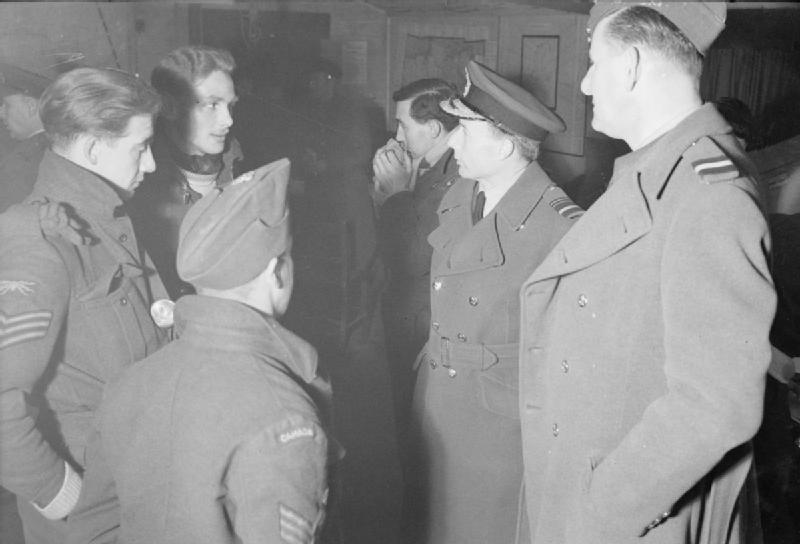
Cochrane, centre wearing cap, talks with aircrew returned from a bombing raid, 1944

In February 1945, Cochrane became Air Officer Commanding at RAF Transport Command, a position he held until 1947 when he became Air Officer Commanding at RAF Flying Training Command. During this time he managed the Berlin Airlift. In 1950 Cochrane was appointed Vice-Chief of the Air Staff. Ralph Cochrane retired from the service in 1952. Following his retirement, Cochrane entered the business world notably as director of Rolls-Royce. He was also chairman of RJM exports which manufactured scientific models and is now known as Cochranes of Oxford.

== Honours and awards ==
In the 1939 New Year Honours, Cochrane was appointed a Commander of the Order of the British Empire (Military Division). In the New Year Honours 1943 Cochrane was invested as a Companion of the Order of the Bath (Military Division). In the 1945 New Year Honours list he was invested as a Knight Commander of the Order of the British Empire. In the 1948 King's Birthday Honours he was invested as a Knight Commander of the Order of the Bath. In the 1950 King's Birthday Honours, he was invested as a Knight Grand Cross of the Order of the British Empire. A road at the Hobsonville airbase was named after Cochrane. A nearby gully also bears his name.

== Dates of rank ==
Rank	Date	Role
Wing commander	1933	
Acting group captain	1937	On secondment to RNZAF
Group captain	1938	
Air commodore (temporary)	1940	
Air marshal (acting)	1945	
Air marshal	1946	
Air chief marshal	1949	

== Notes ==
Military offices
New title Service became independent	Chief of the Air Staff (RNZAF); 1937–1939	Succeeded by Hugh Saunders
Vacant Title last held by Duncan Pitcher	Air Officer Commanding No. 7 Group; 1940	Succeeded by Leonard Cockey
Preceded by Alec Coryton	Air Officer Commanding No. 5 Group; 1943–1945	Succeeded by Hugh Constantine
Preceded by Sir Frederick Bowhill	Air Officer Commanding-in-Chief Transport Command; 1945–1947	Succeeded by Sir Brian Baker
Preceded by Sir Arthur Coningham	Air Officer Commanding-in-Chief Flying Training Command; 1947–1950	Succeeded by Sir Hugh Walmsley
Preceded by Sir Arthur Sanders	Vice Chief of the Air Staff; 1950–1952	Succeeded by Sir John Baker
