= Albert Durston =

Royal Air Force Air Marshal (1894–1959)

Sir Albert Durston
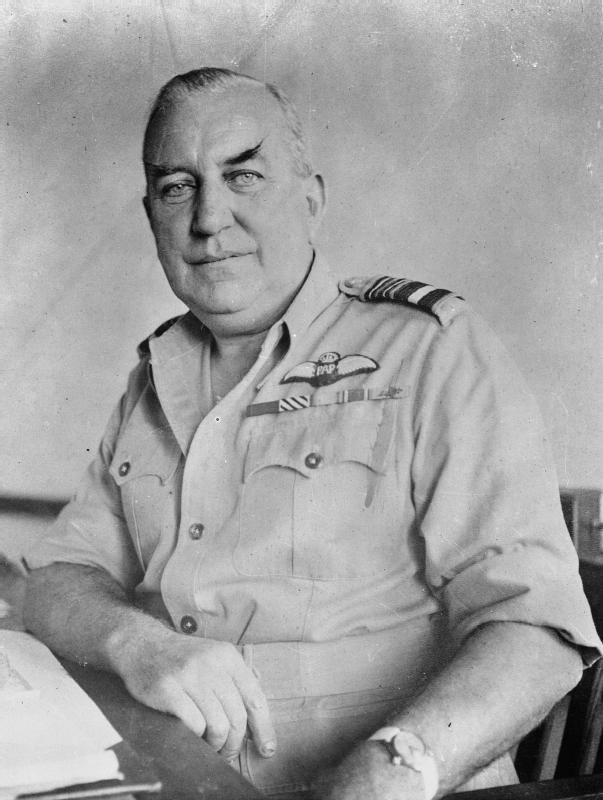
- Air Marshal Durston, Air Officer Commanding No. 222 Group, at Colombo, Ceylon, during the Second World War.
- Born: 19 June 1894
- Died: 24 January 1959 (aged 64)
- Military career
- Allegiance: United Kingdom
- Branch: Royal Navy (1913–18); Royal Air Force (1918–46)
- Service years: 1913–46
- Rank: Air Marshal
- Commands: Deputy Chief of the Air Staff (1945–46); No. 222 Group (1944–45); No. 18 Group (1942–43); School of Naval Co-operation (1927–28); No. 253 Squadron (1918–19)
- Conflicts: First World War; Second World War
- Awards: Knight Commander of the Order of the British Empire; Companion of the Order of the Bath; Air Force Cross; Mentioned in Despatches (2)

Air Marshal Sir Albert Durston, KBE, CB, AFC (19 June 1894 – 24 January 1959) was a senior Royal Air Force (RAF) officer who served as Deputy Chief of the Air Staff from 1945 to 1946.

== RAF career ==
Durston joined the Royal Navy in 1913 and served in the Royal Naval Air Service during the First World War. He was mentioned in despatches for services in home waters in 1917, and appointed Officer Commanding No. 253 Squadron in June 1918. In 1936 he was appointed Fleet Aviation Officer to the Commander-in-Chief of the Home Fleet. He served in the Second World War as Director of Naval Co-operation and then as Air Officer Commanding No. 18 Group. He continued his war service as Senior Air Staff Officer at Headquarters RAF Coastal Command and then as Air Officer Commanding No. 222 Group. His last appointment was as Deputy Chief of the Air Staff from September 1945 until retiring in August 1946.

Military offices
Preceded by Sir Norman Bottomley	Deputy Chief of the Air Staff; 1945–1946	Succeeded by Sir Hugh Walmsley
Preceded by Reginald Marix	Air Officer Commanding No. 18 Group; 1942–1943	Succeeded by Aubrey Ellwood
