= Paul Lloyd (RAF officer) =

Royal Air Force officer

Air Marshal Sir Paul Lloyd KBE
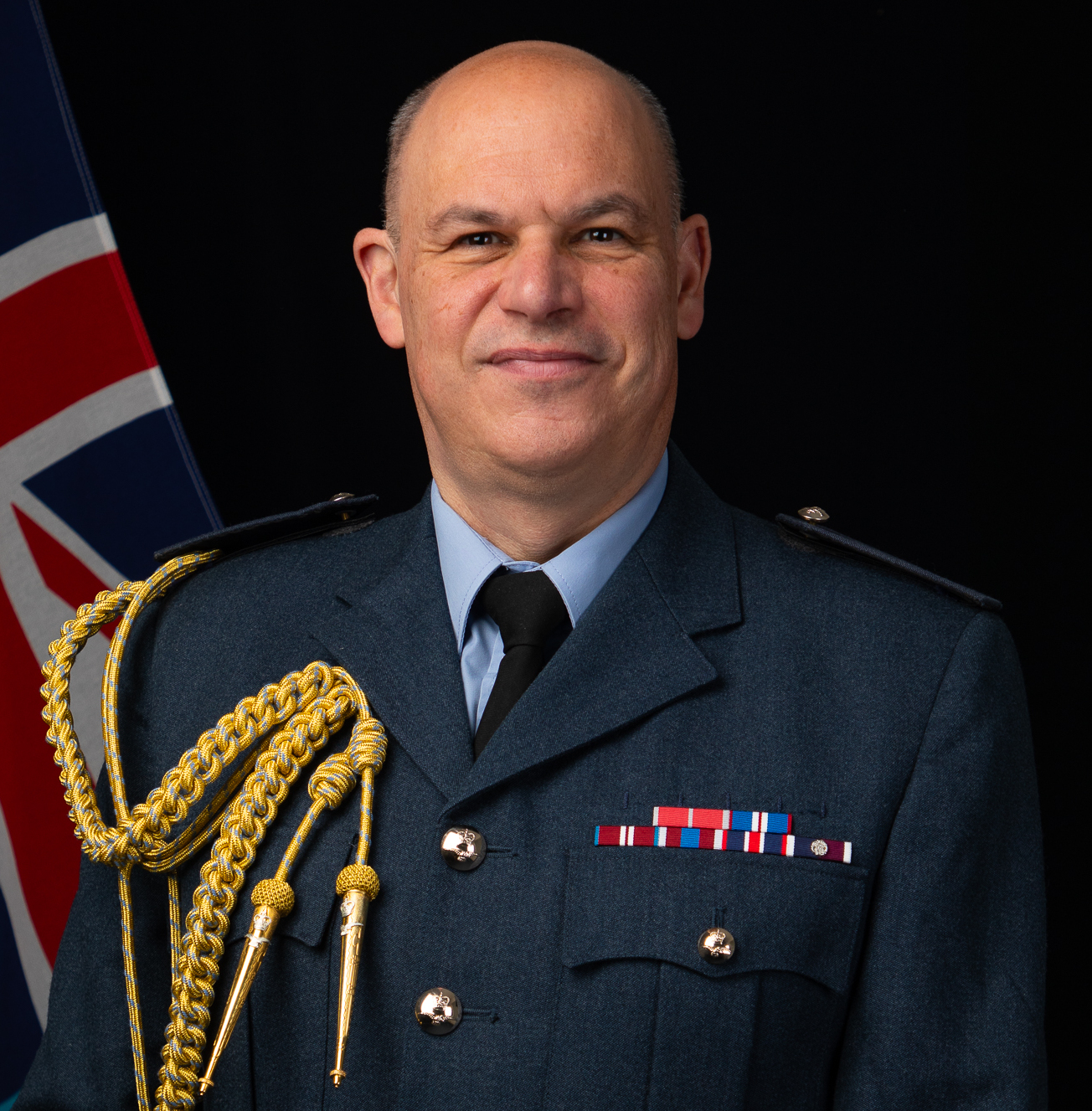
- Lloyd in 2023
- Military career
- Allegiance: United Kingdom
- Branch: Royal Air Force
- Service years: 1991 – present
- Rank: Air Marshal
- Commands: Deputy Chief of the Air Staff
- Awards: Knight Commander of the Order of the British Empire

Air Marshal Sir Paul Harron Lloyd KBE is a senior Royal Air Force officer. He currently serves as Deputy Chief of the Air Staff and Air Member for Personnel.

== Early life and education ==
Lloyd studied mechanical engineering at the University of Manchester, graduating with a first class honours Bachelor of Engineering (BEng) degree. During his military service, he further studied for Master of Defence Administration (MDA) degree from Cranfield University (2002), a Master of Arts (MA) degree in defence studies from King's College London (2008), and a Master of Science (MSc) degree from the University of Oxford in major programme management (2018).

== RAF career ==
Lloyd was commissioned into the Royal Air Force (RAF) on 29 September 1991 with the rank of pilot officer. After training as an engineer officer, he worked on the Hercules C-130, the Tornado GR1 and the Tornado GR4 aircraft. He was promoted to flying officer on 29 March 1992 with seniority in that rank from 29 March 1991, and to flight lieutenant on 29 March 1995.

Lloyd was promoted to group captain on 17 September 2012. He became Chief Engineer and Type Airworthiness Authority within the Unmanned Air Systems project team at Defence Equipment and Support in September 2012. He went on to be Head of the Typhoon Delivery Team at Defence Equipment and Support in August 2016, and Director Support and the Chief Engineer of the RAF in January 2021.

In September 2023, Lloyd was appointed interim Deputy Chief of the Air Staff and Air Member for Personnel, and promoted to acting air marshal. These appointments were formalised on 17 May 2024, and he was promoted to substantive air marshal in June 2024, backdated to 18 September 2023.

He was appointed a Commander of the Order of the British Empire (CBE) in the 2020 Birthday Honours and advanced to a Knight Commander of the Order of the British Empire in the 2026 Birthday Honours.

Military offices
Preceded by Richard Maddison	Deputy Chief of the Air Staff; 2023–present	Incumbent
