= Government War Book =

Plans for the defence of the United Kingdom

The Government War Book was a secret document containing comprehensive plans for the defence of the United Kingdom in the event of war. It was created during the First World War, and maintained throughout the rest of the 20th century. The primary assumption throughout the Cold War period was that the expected threat was attack by the Soviet Union.

Access to copies of the War Book was tightly restricted, with fewer than 100 copies being held across government in 1964. As of 1966, the War Book had 16 chapters, covering all aspects of national defence including military, civil, economic, and diplomatic aspects, and the preservation of the mechanisms of government.

In a Parliamentary question in 2015, the government stated that the War Book had been replaced by provisions under the Civil Contingencies Act, with the National Security Secretariat still having access to the earlier War Book editions. A 2025 House of Commons Library briefing document still mentions preparation of the War Book as one of the historical functions of the Prime Minister.

In 2025, the British government announced that it is carrying out a Strategic Defence Review.

As of January 2026, it was revealed that the United Kingdom still did not currently have any comprehensive national war plan similar to the previous Government War Books.

In April 2026, Air Chief Marshal Sir Richard Knighton said that the government was working on a new version of the Government War Books, but "in a modern context, with a modern society, with modern infrastructure".
