= Ronald Lees =

Royal Air Force Air Marshal (1910–1991)

Sir Ronald Lees
- Born: 27 April 1910; Broken Hill, New South Wales
- Died: 18 May 1991 (aged 81); Adelaide, South Australia
- Military career
- Allegiance: Australia; United Kingdom
- Branch: Royal Australian Air Force (1930–31); Royal Air Force (1931–66)
- Service years: 1930–1966
- Rank: Air Marshal
- Commands: RAF Germany (1963–65); Deputy Chief of the Air Staff (1960–63); No. 83 Group (1952–55); RAF Bassingbourn (1946–49); No. 324 Wing (1942–43); RAF Coltishall (1941–42); No. 72 Squadron (1938–40)
- Conflicts: Second World War
- Awards: Knight Commander of the Order of the Bath; Commander of the Order of the British Empire; Distinguished Flying Cross & Bar; Mentioned in Despatches (3); Commander of the Legion of Merit (United States)

Air Marshal Sir Ronald Beresford Lees, KCB, CBE, DFC & Bar (27 April 1910 – 18 May 1991) was a senior Royal Air Force commander.

== Early life ==
Lees was born in Broken Hill, New South Wales, the son of John Thomas Lees and Eliza Jane Moyle. He was educated at Prince Alfred's College and St Peter's College, Adelaide, and later read mathematics at the University of Adelaide.

== RAF career ==
In January 1930, Lees joined the Royal Australian Air Force (RAAF) as a cadet at Point Cook, Victoria, and in January 1931 took up a short-service commission in the Royal Air Force (RAF). He was made Officer Commanding No. 72 Squadron in 1938 and served in the Second World War, taking part in the Battle of Britain in 1940. During the war he served as Station Commander at RAF Coltishall, as Senior Air Staff Officer at Headquarters No. 242 Group and then on the Sicily Invasion Force.

After the war, Lees became Station Commander at RAF Bassingbourn. He was appointed Air Officer Commanding No. 83 Group in 1952, Assistant Chief of the Air Staff (Operations) in 1955 and Senior Air Staff Officer at Headquarters RAF Fighter Command in 1958. He went on to be Deputy Chief of the Air Staff in 1960 and Commander-in-Chief of RAF Germany and Second Tactical Air Force in 1963 before retiring in 1966.

Military offices
| Preceded by Sir Charles Elworthy | Deputy Chief of the Air Staff; 1960–1963 | Succeeded by Sir Christopher Hartley |
| Preceded by Sir John Grandy | Commander-in-Chief RAF Germany; Also Commander of the Second Tactical Air Force; 1963–1965 | Succeeded by Sir Denis Spotswood |
