= John Baker (RAF officer) =

Royal Air Force Air Chief Marshal (1897-1978)

Air Chief Marshal Sir John Baker GBE KCB MC DFC
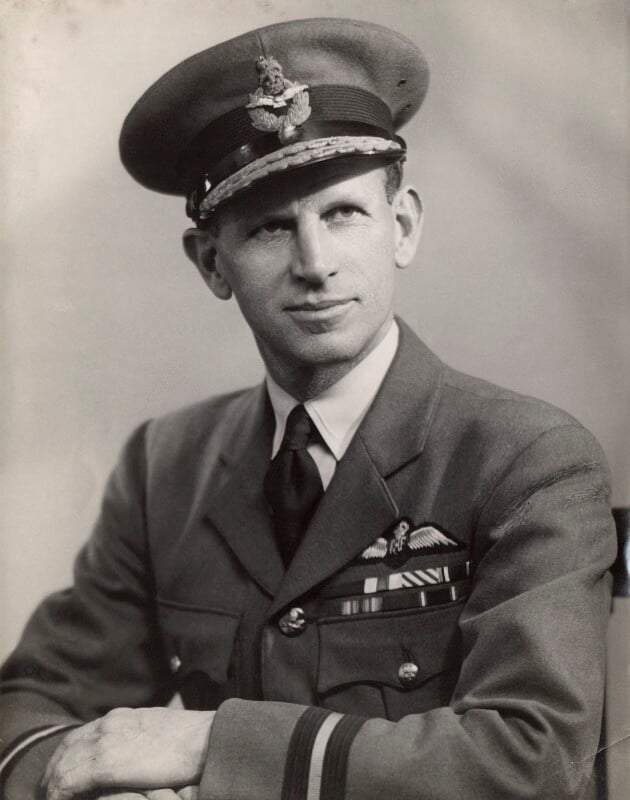
- Baker in 1942
- Born: 23 October 1897; Winnipeg, Canada
- Died: 10 March 1978 (aged 80); Bromley, England
- Military career
- Allegiance: United Kingdom
- Branch: British Army (1916–18); Royal Air Force (1918–56)
- Service years: 1916–1956
- Rank: Air Chief Marshal
- Commands: Controller Aircraft (1953–56); Vice-Chief of the Air Staff (1952–53); RAF Middle East Air Force (1950–52); Coastal Command (1948–50); No. 12 Group (1945–46); No. 33 Squadron (1935)
- Conflicts: First World War; Pink's War; Second World War
- Awards: Knight Grand Cross of the Order of the British Empire; Knight Commander of the Order of the Bath; Military Cross; Distinguished Flying Cross; Mentioned in Despatches

Air Chief Marshal Sir John Wakeling Baker, GBE, KCB, MC, DFC (23 October 1897 – 10 March 1978) was a senior commander in the Royal Air Force in the mid-20th century.

== Flying career ==
Baker was commissioned into the Royal Garrison Artillery in February 1916. He transferred to the Royal Flying Corps later that year initially as a Gunnery Liaison Officer.

In 1918 he was awarded the Military Cross, the citation for which was promulgated in The London Gazette on 26 July 1918, reading:

Lt. John Wakeling Baker, R.G.A. and R.A.F. For conspicuous gallantry and devotion to duty in carrying out low-flying reconnaissances and contact patrols under heavy machine-gun, rifle and anti-aircraft fire, when he remained in the air for long hours, often under abnormally bad weather conditions and often in darkness or thick mist. On one occasion he fired into enemy troops and transport, causing great confusion, and remained over their lines taking notes until quite dark, when he returned with his machine riddled with bullets. On every flight he obtained most important information, which was dropped at headquarters, and throughout the period his work has been magnificent.

He was appointed a Flight Commander in No. 60 Squadron in January 1924 during Pink's War in Waziristan. He was awarded the Distinguished Flying Cross in 1925, with the citation praising his: "gallant and distinguished service with the Royal Air Force in Waziristan. This officer showed devotion to duty throughout the operations and set a high example to all ranks. He performed 69 hours war flying as a pilot, which included 35 raids."

Baker was appointed Officer Commanding No. 33 Squadron in 1935 and then joined the Directing Staff at the RAF Staff College in 1939. He served in the Second World War, initially as Deputy Director of Plans at the Air Ministry and then as Director of Bomber Operations from February 1941. He continued his war service as Senior Air Staff Officer first at Headquarters, Air Forces in India and then at South East Asia Command. He finished the war as Air Officer Commanding No. 12 Group.

After the war, Baker became Director-General of Personnel in 1946, Air Officer Commanding-in-Chief at Coastal Command in 1948 and Commander-in-Chief RAF Middle East Air Force in 1950. Baker's last appointments were as Deputy Chief of the Air Staff in March 1952, Vice-Chief of the Air Staff in November 1952 and Controller of Aircraft at the Ministry of Supply before he retired in 1956.

Military offices
Preceded by Sir Leonard Slatter	Commander-in-Chief Coastal Command; 1948–1950	Succeeded by Sir Charles Steele
Preceded by Sir William Dickson	Commander-in-Chief RAF Middle East Air Force; 1950–1952	Succeeded by Sir Victor Groom
Preceded by Sir Arthur Sanders	Deputy Chief of the Air Staff; March–November 1952	Succeeded by Sir Ronald Ivelaw-Chapman
Preceded by Sir Ralph Cochrane	Vice-Chief of the Air Staff; 1952–1953	Succeeded by Sir Ronald Ivelaw-Chapman
Preceded by Sir John Boothman; As Controller of Supplies (Air)	Controller of Aircraft; 1953–1956	Succeeded by Sir Claude Pelly
