= Arthur Sanders (RAF officer) =

Sir Arthur Sanders
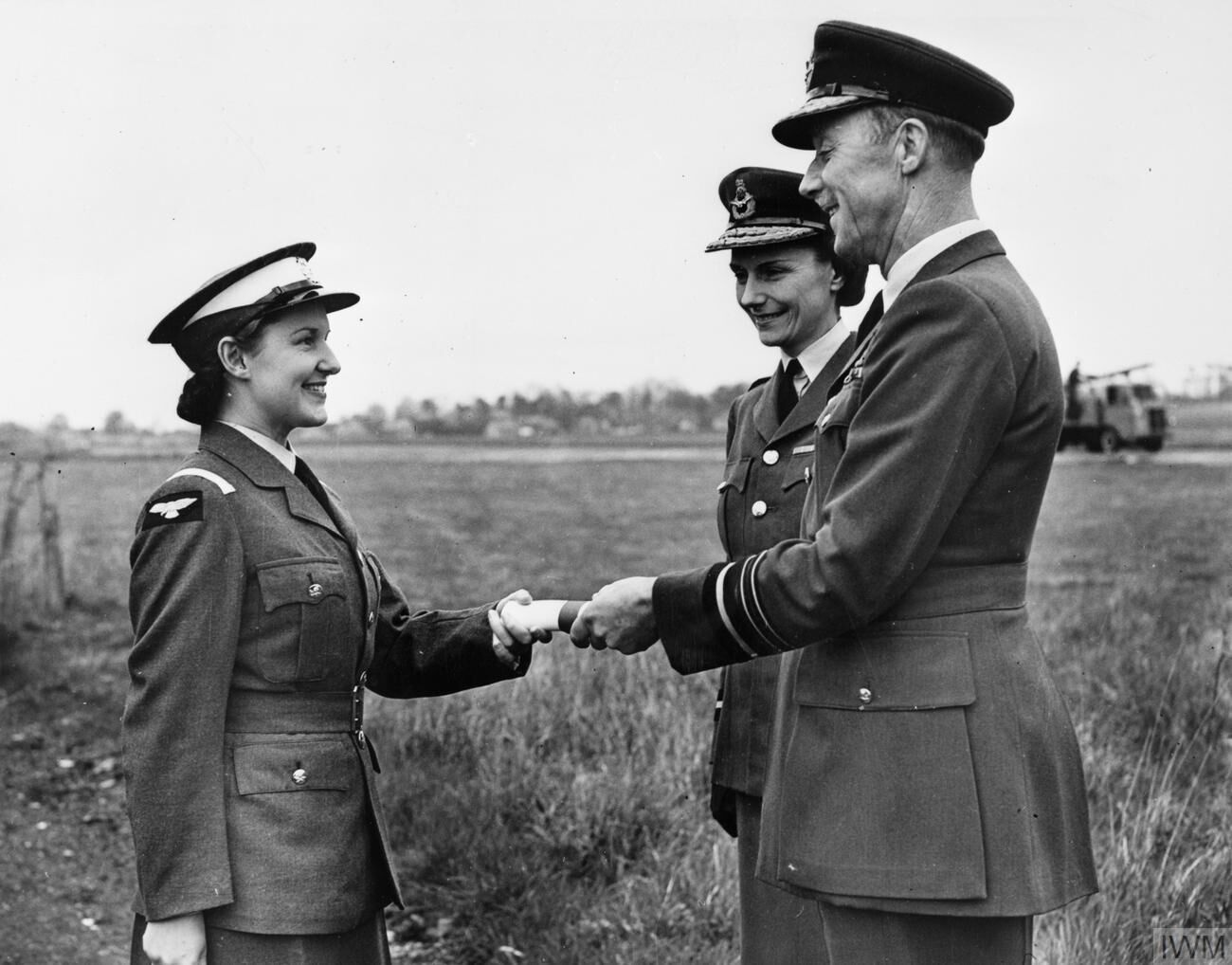
- The Best Cadet receives her certificate from Air Marshal Sir Arthur Sanders and Air Commandant Dame Felicity Hanbury, Director of the Women's Royal Air Force, at Hawkinge, circa 1949–1950
- Born: 17 March 1898; Streatham, London
- Died: 8 February 1974 (aged 75)
- Military career
- Allegiance: United Kingdom
- Branch: British Army (1916–18); Royal Air Force (1918–56)
- Service years: 1916–1956
- Rank: Air Chief Marshal
- Commands: Imperial Defence College (1954–56); RAF Middle East Air Force (1952–53); British Air Forces of Occupation (1947–48); RAF Staff College, Bracknell (1945–47)
- Conflicts: First World War; Second World War
- Awards: Knight Grand Cross of the Order of the Bath; Knight Commander of the Order of the British Empire; Mentioned in Despatches (2); Order of the Red Star (USSR); Commander's Cross with Star of the Order of Polonia Restituta (Poland); Commander of the Legion of Merit (United States)

Air Chief Marshal Sir Arthur Penrose Martyn Sanders, GCB, KBE (17 March 1898 – 8 February 1974), was a pilot in the Royal Flying Corps during the First World War and a senior Royal Air Force commander during the Second World War and the immediate post-war years.

== RAF career ==
Born the son of a clergyman Henry Martyn Sanders and his wife Maud Mary (née Dixon), Sanders was educated at Haileybury before undergoing officer training at Sandhurst. Sanders was commissioned into the Northumberland Fusiliers in April 1916 but transferred to the Royal Flying Corps a few weeks later. He served as a pilot in No 5 Squadron RFC and in May 1917, was wounded in a dogfight with German aircraft. As a result, he lost his arm but managed to land his aircraft. Due to his disability, Sanders was assigned to junior staff officer duties for the remainder of the war. On 1 April 1918, Sanders was transferred to the Royal Air Force along with his fellow Flying Corps officers.

Sanders remained in the RAF after the war and made steady progress through the ranks. He served in a variety of staff and instructional roles, notably on the air staff of Aden Command in 1932 and 1933. He was promoted to group captain just before the outbreak of the Second World War.

During the Second World War, he first served on the staff of the RAF staff College where he was responsible for planning the first wartime course. In 1940, Sanders was appointed the Director of Ground Defence at the Air Ministry and his work was partly responsible for the establishment of the RAF Regiment in 1942. In late 1942 Sanders was appointed Assistant Chief of Staff (Air) at Allied Force Headquarters and in January 1943 he took up the post at Air Officer Administration at Bomber Command.

After the war, Sanders served as the Commandant of the RAF staff College at Bracknell before spending much of 1948 as Air Officer Commanding-in-Chief of British Air Forces of Occupation. He then served as Vice Chief of the Air Staff and Deputy Chief of the Air Staff. In May 1952, Sanders became Commander-in-Chief of the RAF's Middle East Air Force before his final tour as Commandant of the Imperial Defence College. He retired on 29 January 1956.

Military offices
Preceded by Ronald Graham	Commandant of the RAF Staff College, Bracknell; 1945–1947	Succeeded by Thomas Williams
Preceded by Sir James Robb	Vice-Chief of the Air Staff; 1948–1950	Succeeded by Sir Ralph Cochrane
Preceded by Sir Hugh Walmsley	Deputy Chief of the Air Staff; 1950–1952	Succeeded by Sir John Baker
Preceded by Sir Victor Groom	Commander-in-Chief RAF Middle East Air Force; 1952–1953	Succeeded by Sir Claude Pelly
Preceded by Sir Frank Simpson	Commandant of the Imperial Defence College; 1954–1956	Succeeded by Sir Guy Russell
