= Richard Maddison =

Royal Air Force officer

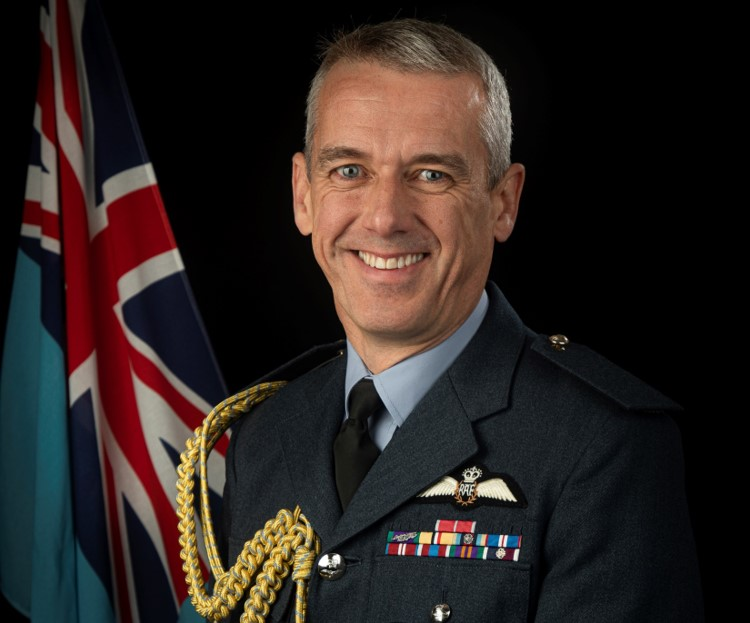
- Maddison in 2023
- Military career
- Allegiance: United Kingdom
- Branch: Royal Air Force
- Service years: 1988–2024
- Rank: Air Marshal
- Commands: Deputy Commander Capability/Deputy Chief of the Air Staff (2023); No. 22 Group RAF (2020–23); Chinook Force (2013–15); RAF Odiham (2013–15)
- Conflicts: The Troubles; Iraq War; War in Afghanistan
- Awards: Officer of the Order of the British Empire; Queen's Commendation for Valuable Service

Air Marshal Richard Clark Maddison, OBE was a senior Royal Air Force officer. He was Air Officer Commanding No. 22 Group RAF from 2020 to 2023, and then served as Deputy Chief of the Air Staff and Air Member for Personnel from May to September 2023.

== RAF career ==
Maddison was commissioned into the Royal Air Force (RAF) on 15 December 1988. He was awarded the Queen's Commendation for Valuable Service "in recognition of gallant and distinguished services in Northern Ireland during the period 1st October 1997 to 31st March 1998". He was appointed an Officer of the Order of the British Empire in the 2011 Birthday Honours.

Maddison became station commander at RAF Odiham and Chinook Force commander in October 2013, and Head of Capability Joint Plans in the Ministry of Defence in July 2016. He became Deputy Commander NATO Air Command Afghanistan, Headquarters Resolute Support in April 2019.

Maddison was appointed Air Officer Commanding No. 22 Group in August 2020. In May 2023, he was appointed Deputy Commander Capability at Air Command and Air Member for Personnel. He was promoted to air marshal on 2 May 2023. In September 2023, Air Marshal Paul Lloyd replaced Maddison as Deputy Chief of the Air Staff. He retired on the 16 September 2024.

== Personal life ==
Maddison attended English Martyrs School and Sixth Form College in Hartlepool. He was the Defence Champion for non-religious and humanist personnel.

Military offices
Preceded by Dom Toriati	Station Commander, RAF Odiham; Chinook Force Commander; 2013–2015	Succeeded by Philip Robinson
Preceded by Andrew Wallis	Head of Capability Joint Plans; 2016–2019	Succeeded by Nicholas Perry
Preceded by Warren James	Air Officer Commanding No 22 (Training) Group; 2020–2023	Succeeded by Ian Townsend
Preceded by Sir Richard Knighton	Deputy Chief of the Air Staff; 2023	Succeeded by Paul Lloyd (interim)
