= Thomas Pike =

Marshal of the Royal Air Force (1906–1983)

Marshal of the Royal Air Force Sir Thomas Pike GCB CBE DFC* DL
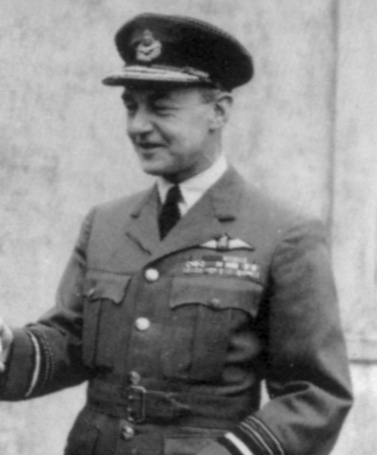
- Sir Thomas Pike in 1956
- Born: 29 June 1906; Lewisham, London
- Died: 1 June 1983 (aged 76); RAF Halton, Buckinghamshire
- Burial place: St. Andrew's churchyard, North Weald Bassett
- Relatives: Lieutenant General Sir William Pike (brother); Lieutenant General Sir Hew Pike (nephew)
- Military career
- Allegiance: United Kingdom
- Branch: Royal Air Force
- Service years: 1924–1967
- Rank: Marshal of the Royal Air Force
- Commands: Chief of the Air Staff (1960–63); RAF Fighter Command (1956–59); No. 11 Group (1950–51); Officers' Advanced Training School (1945–46); No. 1 Mobile Operations Room Unit (1943–44); RAF North Weald (1942); No. 219 Squadron (1941)
- Conflicts: Second World War
- Awards: Knight Grand Cross of the Order of the Bath; Commander of the Order of the British Empire; Distinguished Flying Cross & Bar; Mentioned in dispatches Officer of the Legion of Merit (United States)

Marshal of the Royal Air Force Sir Thomas Geoffrey Pike, GCB, CBE, DFC & Bar, DL (29 June 1906 – 1 June 1983) was a senior officer in the Royal Air Force. He served in the Second World War as a night fighter squadron commander and then as a station commander. He was Chief of the Air Staff in the early 1960s and, in that role, deployed British air power as part of the British response to the Brunei Revolt. Also, in the face of escalating costs, he implemented the cancellation of the British Blue Streak ballistic missile system but then found the RAF was without any such capability when the Americans cancelled their own Skybolt ballistic missile system. He went on to be Deputy Supreme Commander Supreme Headquarters Allied Powers Europe in the mid-1960s.

== RAF career ==
Born the son of Captain Sydney Royston Pike and Sarah Elizabeth Pike (née Huddleston), Pike was educated at Bedford School between 1915 and 1923 before joining the Royal Air Force as a flight cadet on 17 January 1924. On successfully passing through the Royal Air Force College Cranwell, he was commissioned as a pilot officer on 16 December 1925 and immediately posted to No. 56 Squadron at RAF Biggin Hill where he flew Gloster Grebes and then Armstrong Whitworth Siskins. Promoted to flying officer on 16 June 1927, he attended the instructors' course at the Central Flying School in Autumn 1928 and then became an instructor first with No. 5 Flying Training School at RAF Sealand and then, from May 1929, at the Central Flying School, where he was a member of the aerobatic team. Promoted to flight lieutenant on 9 July 1930, Pike attended the Long Aircraft Engineering Course at the Home Aircraft Depot at RAF Henlow from August 1930 and then joined the engineering staff at the RAF Depot in the Middle East in October 1932. He became an instructor at No. 4 Flying Training School at RAF Abu Suwayr in November 1934 and, after attending the RAF Staff College from January 1937, he was promoted to squadron leader on 1 February 1937. He was posted to No. 10 Flying Training School at RAF Ternhill as Chief Flying Instructor in January 1938 and then became a staff officer in the Deputy Directorate of Peace Organisation within the Air Ministry in February 1939.

Pike served in the Second World War, initially on the air staff within the Directorate of Organisation at the Air Ministry, and was promoted to the temporary rank of wing commander on 1 March 1940 (made permanent in April 1942). He was appointed Officer Commanding No. 219 Squadron flying Bristol Beaufighters from RAF Tangmere in February 1941 and was awarded the Distinguished Flying Cross on 13 May 1941 for showing great skill in intercepting enemy aircraft at night, destroying a raiding aircraft on his first night patrol. He was awarded a bar to the Distinguished Flying Cross on 30 May 1941 for engaging attackers at night when the aerodrome was illuminated by the glare from a large number of incendiary bombs.

Pike was given command of the Night Fighters of No. 11 Group in September 1941 and then went on to be Station Commander at RAF North Weald in February 1942. Promoted to the temporary rank of group captain on 27 March 1942, he became Officer Commanding No. 1 Mobile Operations Room Unit during the Allied Landings in Italy in May 1943 for which role he was mentioned in dispatches in June 1943. He went on to be Senior Air Staff Officer at HQ Desert Air Force in February 1944. Appointed a Commander of the Order of the British Empire in the 1944 Birthday Honours, he became Commandant of the Officers' Advanced Training School in June 1945. He was also awarded the American Officer of the Legion of Merit on 16 October 1945.

Pike was appointed a Companion of the Order of the Bath in the 1946 New Year Honours. After the war he stayed in the RAF and became Director of Operational Requirements at the Air Ministry in October 1946 being promoted to air commodore on 1 July 1947. Then, after attending the Imperial Defence College in 1949, he was made Air Officer Commanding No. 11 Group in January 1950. He was given the acting rank of air vice-marshal on 9 January 1950. He became Deputy Chief of Staff (Operations) at HQ Allied Air Forces Central Europe in July 1951, Assistant Chief of Air Staff (Policy) in June 1953 and Deputy Chief of the Air Staff with the acting rank of air marshal on 9 November 1953. He was confirmed in the rank of air marshal on 1 January 1955. Advanced to Knight Commander of the Order of the Bath in the 1955 Birthday Honours, he went on to be Air Officer Commanding-in-Chief at RAF Fighter Command in August 1956. He was promoted to air chief marshal on 1 November 1957.

Pike became Chief of the Air Staff on 1 January 1960. In that role he deployed British air power as part of the British response to the Brunei Revolt. Also, in the face of escalating costs, he implemented the cancellation of the British Blue Streak ballistic missile system but then found the RAF was without any such capability when the Americans cancelled their own Skybolt ballistic missile system. He was advanced to Knight Grand Cross of the Order of the Bath in the 1961 New Year Honours and promoted to Marshal of the Royal Air Force on 6 April 1962. Pike was then Deputy Supreme Commander Supreme Headquarters Allied Powers Europe from January 1964 until his retirement in March 1967.

== Later life ==
Following his retirement, Pike lived in Hastingwood in Essex and was made a deputy lieutenant of Essex in February 1973: he continued in the post until December 1981. He was president of the Royal Air Forces Association from 1969 to 1979 and his interests included local history and arranging engineering apprenticeships for local teenagers in Essex. He died at RAF Halton on 1 June 1983 and, due to his time spent at North Weald, he was buried in the military section of St. Andrew's churchyard, North Weald Bassett.

== Family ==
In 1930 Pike married Kathleen Althea Elwell; they had a son and two daughters. Sir Thomas's brother was Lieutenant General Sir William Pike and his nephew (Sir William's son) is Lieutenant General Sir Hew Pike, who commanded the 3rd Battalion, The Parachute Regiment in the Falklands War.

== Sources ==
- Probert, Henry (1991). High Commanders of the Royal Air Force. HMSO. ISBN 0-11-772635-4.

Military offices
| Preceded by Stanley Vincent | Air Officer Commanding No. 11 Group; 1950–1951 | Succeeded by The Earl of Bandon |
| Preceded by Sir Ronald Ivelaw-Chapman | Deputy Chief of the Air Staff; 1953–1956 | Succeeded by Sir Geoffrey Tuttle |
| Preceded by Sir Hubert Patch | Commander-in-Chief Fighter Command; 1956–1959 | Succeeded by Sir Hector McGregor |
| Preceded by Sir Dermot Boyle | Chief of the Air Staff; 1960–1963 | Succeeded by Sir Charles Elworthy |
| Preceded by Sir Hugh Stockwell | Deputy Supreme Allied Commander Europe; 1964–1967 | Succeeded by Sir Robert Bray |
