= Stephen Hillier =

Royal Air Force air marshal (born 1962)

Air Chief Marshal Sir Stephen Hillier GCB CBE DFC
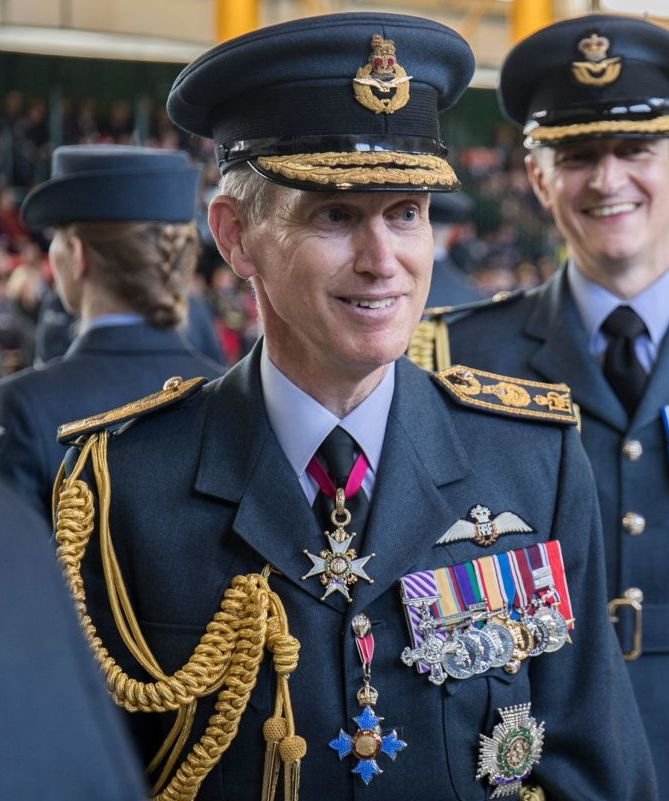
- Hillier in 2019

Chair of the Civil Aviation Authority
- Incumbent
- Assumed office 2020
- Preceded by: Deirdre Hutton

Personal details
- Born: 1962 (age 63–64) Kilmarnock, Ayrshire, Scotland
- Military career
- Allegiance: United Kingdom
- Branch: Royal Air Force
- Service years: 1980–2019
- Rank: Air Chief Marshal
- Commands: Chief of the Air Staff; No. 2 Group; RAF Lossiemouth; II (AC) Squadron
- Conflicts: Gulf War; Iraq War
- Awards: Knight Grand Cross of the Order of the Bath; Commander of the Order of the British Empire; Distinguished Flying Cross; Bronze Star Medal (United States)

Air Chief Marshal Sir Stephen John Hillier, GCB, CBE, DFC (born 1962) is a retired senior Royal Air Force officer, who served as Chief of the Air Staff from 2016 to 2019. He was awarded the Distinguished Flying Cross for actions in the Gulf in 1999 and was awarded the United States Bronze Star Medal for service in the Iraq War. He went on to be Air Officer Commanding No. 2 Group, Director Information Superiority at the Ministry of Defence, Deputy Chief of the Defence Staff (Capability) and finally Chief of the Air Staff from July 2016. He was appointed chair of the Civil Aviation Authority in 2020.

== Early life and education ==
Hillier was born in Kilmarnock, Ayrshire, Scotland, the son of Victor and Ann Hillier, and grew up in nearby Bellfield. During the Second World War, his father was an aircraftman in the Royal Air Force, and was a wireless operator in a mobile signals unit in Burma and India. He was educated at Kilmarnock Academy and as a youth earned a private pilot's licence through the Air Training Corps flying scholarship scheme.

During his military career, he studied social sciences with the Open University, graduating with a Bachelor of Arts (BA) degree in 1998. He undertook a Master of Arts (MA) degree in defence studies at King's College London, graduating in 1999.

== RAF career ==
Hillier was commissioned as an acting pilot officer on 6 November 1980, and regraded to pilot officer (after Initial Officer Training) on 6 November 1981. He was promoted to flying officer on 6 November 1982. He was a pilot, flying the Tornado, and served in the 1991 Gulf War. He was promoted to squadron leader on 1 July 1991 and wing commander on 1 July 1996, and was awarded the Distinguished Flying Cross for his actions commanding II (AC) Squadron in the Gulf during Operation Southern Watch on 29 October 1999.

Promoted to group captain on 1 July 2000, Hillier became station commander at RAF Lossiemouth. He then served in the Iraq War, where he commanded the Tornado Detachment with aircraft supplied from No. 2, 12 and 617 Squadrons. For this, he was awarded the US Bronze Star Medal on 31 October 2003. He was also appointed Commander of the Order of the British Empire (CBE) in the 2005 New Year Honours, just prior to his promotion to air commodore on 1 January 2005 of that year.

Hillier served as Head of Theatre Airspace Capability in the Ministry of Defence prior to his promotion to air vice marshal and appointment as Air Officer Commanding No. 2 Group in September 2008. In October 2010 he returned to the Ministry of Defence as Director Information Superiority and in June 2012 he was promoted to air marshal and appointed Deputy Chief of the Defence Staff (Capability). He managed the UK's Carrier Enabled Power Projection Programme, encompassing the aircraft carrier, F35B Lightning II and Merlin Helicopter programmes. Hillier became Air Aide-de-Camp (ADC) to Queen Elizabeth II and succeeded Air Chief Marshal Sir Andrew Pulford as Chief of the Air Staff on 12 July 2016.

Hillier was appointed Knight Commander of the Order of the Bath (KCB) in the 2014 New Year Honours, and Knight Grand Cross of the Order of the Bath (GCB) in the 2020 Birthday Honours.

== Later life ==
Hillier has been a trustee of Veterans Aid since October 2019. In June 2020, he was nominated to be chair of the Civil Aviation Authority. He took up the appointment on 1 August 2020. Since 2021, he has also been an honorary professor in the University of Birmingham's School of Government.

== Personal life ==
In 1984, Hillier married Elaine Margaret Burns in Kilmarnock. They have two children.

Military offices
Preceded by Andrew Pulford	Air Officer Commanding No. 2 Group; 2008–2010	Succeeded by Philip Osborn
Preceded by Paul Lambert	Deputy Chief of the Defence Staff (Capability); 2012–2016	Succeeded by Mark Poffley
Preceded by Sir Andrew Pulford	Chief of the Air Staff; 2016–2019	Succeeded by Michael Wigston
