= Claude Pelly =

Royal Air Force commander (1902–1972)

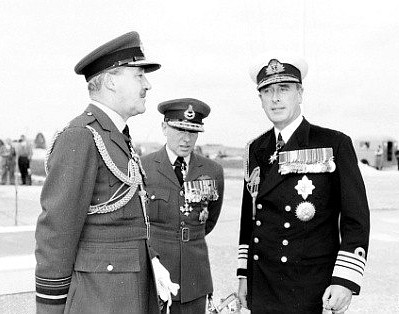
- Air Marshal Pelly (centre) with Air Marshal Hardman (left) and Admiral Lord Louis Mountbatten (right) at a ceremonial parade for No. 78 Wing RAAF on its departure from garrison duty on Malta, 1954
- Born: 19 August 1902; Great Malvern, Worcestershire, England
- Died: 12 August 1972 (aged 69); Deben, Suffolk, England
- Spouse: Margaret Ogilvie Spencer
- Military career
- Allegiance: United Kingdom
- Branch: Royal Air Force
- Service years: 1920–1959
- Rank: Air chief marshal
- Commands: RAF Middle East Air Force (1953–56); Aeroplane and Armament Experimental Establishment (1946–48)
- Conflicts: Second World War
- Awards: Knight Grand Cross of the Order of the British Empire; Knight Commander of the Order of the Bath; Military Cross; Mentioned in dispatches (3)

Air Chief Marshal Sir Claude Bernard Raymond Pelly, GBE, KCB, MC (19 August 1902 – 12 August 1972) was a senior commander in the Royal Air Force during the middle of the 20th century.

== RAF career ==
Claude Pelly started his Air Force career at the RAF College Cranwell in 1920. In 1931 he was deployed to Iraq where he became Air Liaison Officer earning the Military Cross "for distinguished service rendered in the field in connection with military operations in Northern Kurdistan, Iraq during the period December 1931 to June 1932." He served in World War II initially as Head of Intelligence at Headquarters Air Component of the British Expeditionary Force and then as Senior Air Staff Officer for the Desert Air Force.

After the War he became Commandant of the Aeroplane and Armament Experimental Establishment and then Assistant Chief of the Air Staff (Technical/Operational Requirements) before joining the Directing Staff at the Imperial Defence College in 1951. He went on to be Commander-in-Chief RAF Middle East Air Force in 1953 and Controller of Aircraft at the Ministry of Supply in 1956. Pelly was appointed Aide-de-camp to the Queen in 1957 and retired as an air chief marshal in 1959.

In retirement he was a Board Member of the United Kingdom Atomic Energy Authority from 1960 to 1964.

== Family ==
In 1930 he married Margaret Ogilvie Spencer; they had three sons and one daughter.

Military offices
Preceded by Sir Arthur Sanders	Commander-in-Chief RAF Middle East Air Force; 1953–1956	Succeeded by Sir Hubert Patch
Preceded by Sir John Baker	Controller of Aircraft; 1956–1959	Succeeded by Sir George Gardner
