= Denis Spotswood =

Marshal of the Royal Air Force (1916-2001)

Marshal of the Royal Air Force Sir Denis Spotswood GCB CBE DSO DFC
- Born: 26 September 1916; Lewisham, London
- Died: 11 November 2001 (aged 85); Henley-on-Thames, Oxfordshire
- Military career
- Allegiance: United Kingdom
- Branch: Royal Air Force
- Service years: 1936–1974
- Rank: Marshal of the Royal Air Force
- Commands: Chief of the Air Staff (1971–74); RAF Strike Command (1968–71); RAF Germany (1965–68); No. 3 (Bomber) Group (1964–65); RAF College Cranwell (1958–61); RAF Linton-on-Ouse (1954–56); RAF Coltishall (1948); RAF Horsham St Faith (1947–48); No. 500 Squadron (1942–43)
- Conflicts: Second World War
- Awards: Knight Grand Cross of the Order of the Bath; Commander of the Order of the British Empire; Companion of the Distinguished Service Order; Distinguished Flying Cross; Mentioned in Despatches (2); Officer of the Legion of Merit (United States)

Marshal of the Royal Air Force Sir Denis Frank Spotswood, GCB, CBE, DSO, DFC (26 September 1916 – 11 November 2001) was a senior commander in the Royal Air Force. He fought in the Second World War as a flying boat pilot and then as a coastal reconnaissance squadron commander during Operation Torch, the invasion of North Africa. He served as a station commander in the late 1940s and early 1950s before becoming a senior air commander in the late 1950s. As the Chief of the Air Staff in the early 1970s he had a major role in implementing the defence savings demanded by the Heath Government in the face of economic difficulties at the time.

== RAF career ==
The son of Frank Henry Spotswood and Maud Caroline Spotswood (née Booth), Spotswood was educated at Kingston Grammar School before joining the Evening Standard as a trainee journalist in 1932. He decided to change career and joined the Royal Air Force, being commissioned as an acting pilot officer on 14 April 1936 and, after completing flying training, he was confirmed as a flying Officer on 6 January 1937.

He was posted to No. 220 Squadron flying Ansons from RAF Bircham Newton in 1936 in January 1937 and then transferred to No. 201 Squadron flying Southampton flying boats from RAF Calshot in October 1937 and then to No. 209 Squadron flying Singapore and Stranraer flying boats from RAF Invergordon in February 1938.

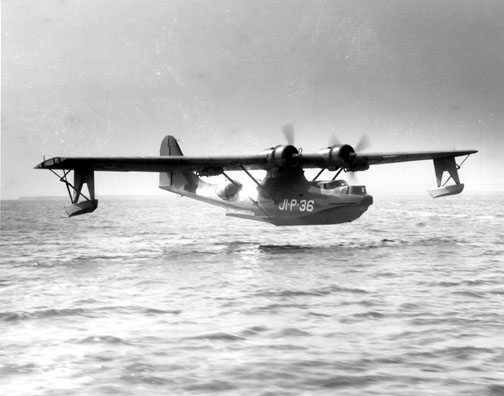
Catalina flying boat, a type flown by Spotswood during the Second World War

Spotswood served in the Second World War, initially undertaking patrols of the Western Approaches using the new Lerwick flying boats and then the new Catalina flying boats of No. 209 Squadron. He was promoted to flight lieutenant on 3 September 1940, and mentioned in despatches on 24 September 1941. Promoted to the rank of squadron leader on a temporary basis on 1 December 1941, he became Officer Commanding No. 500 Squadron flying Hudson coastal reconnaissance aircraft from RAF St Eval in April 1942. Promoted to squadron leader on a war substantive basis on 18 July 1942, Spotswood and his squadron were deployed to Gibraltar in November 1942 to take part in Operation Torch, the invasion of North Africa. He was awarded the Distinguished Flying Cross on 10 November 1942.

Spotswood joined the Air Staff in the Directorate of Operations at the Air Ministry in April 1943, before attending the RAF Staff College, Bulstrode Park for much of the remainder of the year. He was mentioned in despatches again on 2 June 1943 and appointed a Companion of the Distinguished Service Order on 28 September 1943. He was appointed Director of Plans at the Headquarters of the Supreme Allied Commander South East Asia in February 1944 and became a wing commander on a temporary basis on 1 July 1944 and on a war substantive basis on 11 August 1944. He was promoted to squadron leader on a permanent basis on 1 September 1945.

Appointed a Commander of the Order of the British Empire in the 1946 New Year Honours, Spotswood joined the Directing Staff at the RAF Staff College, Bracknell in February 1946 and was promoted to wing commander on 1 July 1947. In December 1947 he was Station Commander at RAF Horsham St Faith, and in January 1948 he became Station Commander at RAF Coltishall. On 9 March 1948 he was made an Officer of the Legion of Merit by the President of the United States.

After attending the Air Defence Course at the School of Land/Air Warfare as well as the jet conversion course, Spotswood joined the Directing Staff at the Imperial Defence College in March 1950. In June 1952 he had an exchange posting to the Tactical Operations Plans Branch at Headquarters United States Air Force.

On 1 January 1954 he was promoted to group captain, and became Station Commander at RAF Linton-on-Ouse. In August 1954. he became deputy director of Plans at the Air Ministry in October 1956 and, having been appointed Aide-de-Camp to the Queen on 18 June 1957, he became Commandant at the RAF College Cranwell in August 1958. He was promoted to air commodore on 1 January 1960. Appointed a Companion of the Order of the Bath in the 1961 New Year Honours, Spotswood became Assistant Chief of the Staff (Air Defence) at SHAPE in June 1961.

Promoted to air vice-marshal on 1 July 1961, he became Chairman of the Pathfinder Study Group in November 1963, charged with determining the shape, size and cost of the RAF front line. His main recommendation, which was implemented, was to merge RAF Fighter Command and RAF Bomber Command to form RAF Strike Command. He went on to be Air Officer Commanding No. 3 Bomber Group in August 1964 and Commander-in-Chief RAF Germany as well as Commander of the Second Tactical Air Force on 6 December 1965.

Having been advanced to Knight Commander of the Order of the Bath in the 1966 Birthday Honours and been promoted to air marshal on 1 July 1966, Spotswood became Commander-in-Chief RAF Strike Command on 26 August 1968. He was promoted to air chief marshal on 1 November 1968, and appointed Air Aide-de-Camp to the Queen on 7 July 1970.

Advanced to Knight Grand Cross of the Order of the Bath in the 1971 New Year Honours, he became Chief of the Air Staff on 1 April 1971. As Chief of the Air Staff he had a major role in implementing the defence savings demanded by the Heath Government in the face of economic difficulties at the time. Spotswood presented Prince Charles with his 'wings' at the end of his flying training in August 1971. Spotswood was promoted to Marshal of the Royal Air Force on 31 March 1974 and retired on the same day.

== Later life ==
In retirement Spotswood became Deputy Chairman of Rolls-Royce, a Director of Dowty Group and then a Director of Smiths Industries. He also became Chairman of the Trustees of the RAF Museum and of the Royal Star and Garter Home. He died of cancer at Thamesfield Care Home in Henley-on-Thames on 11 November 2001.

== Personal life ==
In July 1942 he married Margaret Ann Child; they had one son. His interests included golf and gardening.

== Sources ==
- Probert, Henry (1991). High Commanders of the Royal Air Force. HMSO. ISBN 0-11-772635-4.

Military offices
Preceded by Sir Ronald Lees	Commander-in-Chief RAF Germany; Also Commander of the Second Tactical Air Force; 1965–1968	Succeeded by Christopher Foxley-Norris
Preceded by Sir Wallace Kyle	Commander-in-Chief Strike Command; 1968–1971	Succeeded by Sir Andrew Humphrey
Preceded by Sir John Grandy	Chief of the Air Staff; 1971–1974	Succeeded by Sir Andrew Humphrey
