= Charles Elworthy, Baron Elworthy =

New Zealand-born Royal Air Force officer

Marshal of the Royal Air Force The Right Honourable The Lord Elworthy KG GCB CBE DSO LVO DFC AFC
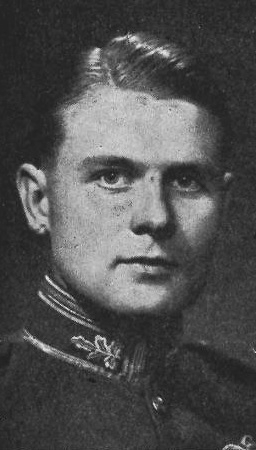
- Charles Elworthy as a wing commander
- Born: 23 March 1911; Timaru, New Zealand
- Died: 4 April 1993 (aged 82); Christchurch, New Zealand
- Military career
- Allegiance: United Kingdom
- Branch: Royal Air Force
- Service years: 1933–1971
- Rank: Marshal of the Royal Air Force
- Commands: Chief of the Defence Staff (1967–1971); Chief of the Air Staff (1963–1967); Middle East Command (Aden) (1960–1963); RAF Staff College, Bracknell (1957–1959); RAF Odiham (1953); RAF Tangmere (1951–1953); RAF Waddington (1943–1944); No. 82 Squadron (1940–1941)
- Conflicts: Second World War
- Awards: Knight Companion of the Order of the Garter; Knight Grand Cross of the Order of the Bath; Commander of the Order of the British Empire; Companion of the Distinguished Service Order; Lieutenant of the Royal Victorian Order; Distinguished Flying Cross; Air Force Cross; Mentioned in Despatches (3)
- Other work

Member of the House of Lords
- Lord Temporal
- Life peerage 8 May 1972 – 4 April 1993

Personal details
- Party: Crossbencher

Marshal of the Royal Air Force Samuel Charles Elworthy, Baron Elworthy (23 March 1911 – 4 April 1993) was a New Zealand-born senior officer in the Royal Air Force. He served as commander of a squadron of Blenheim bombers and then as a station commander during the Second World War. He became Chief of the Air Staff in the mid-1960s and implemented the cancellation of the TSR-2 strike aircraft and the HS681 military transport aircraft programmes. He also became Chief of the Defence Staff in which role he oversaw the evacuation from Aden in November 1967 and had to respond to the growing crisis in Northern Ireland in the late 1960s.

== RAF career ==
Elworthy was the son of Percy Ashton Elworthy and Bertha Victoria Elworthy (née Julius). Elworthy was also a grandson of Edward Elworthy. Educated at Marlborough College and Trinity College, Cambridge, Charles Elworthy was called to the Bar at Lincoln's Inn before he joined the Reserve of Air Force Officers as a pilot officer on probation on 14 August 1933. He was confirmed in the rank on 14 August 1934.

Elworthy was granted a commission as a pilot officer in No. 600 (City of London) (Fighter) Squadron, part of the Auxiliary Air Force, where he flew Harts, with effect from 15 January 1935. He became attached to the Royal Air Force on 28 October 1935 and joined No.15 Squadron at RAF Abingdon, again flying Harts, with effect from the same date. He was granted a permanent commission in the Royal Air Force on 3 March 1936, promoted to flying officer on 3 September 1936 and became Personal Assistant to Air Chief Marshal Sir Edgar Ludlow-Hewitt, the Air Officer Commanding-in-Chief at RAF Bomber Command, in November 1937. Promoted to flight lieutenant on 3 September 1938, he was posted as a pilot and then a flight commander with No. 108 Squadron at RAF Bassingbourn flying Blenheim bombers in January 1939.

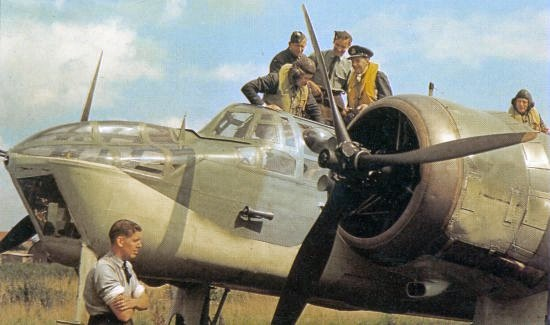
Bristol Blenheim, a type flown by Elworthy during the Second World War

Elworthy served in the Second World War, initially in a training role with No. 108 Squadron and then, having been promoted to the temporary rank of squadron leader on 1 March 1940 (made permanent in April 1942) he became Chief Flying Instructor with No. 13 Officer Training Unit in April 1940. He was appointed a flight commander with No. 82 Squadron flying Blenheims from RAF Watton in August 1940 and then Officer Commanding No. 82 Squadron in December 1940. He was awarded the Air Force Cross in the 1941 New Year Honours on 1 January 1941 and the Distinguished Flying Cross on 7 March 1941. In March 1941, despite heavy and accurate anti-aircraft fire, he scored a direct hit on an enemy tanker, setting it on fire: he was appointed a Companion of the Distinguished Service Order for this on 22 April 1941.

Elworthy joined the air staff responsible for operations at Headquarters No. 2 Group in May 1941, was promoted to the rank of wing commander on a temporary basis on 1 September 1941 and mentioned in despatches on 24 September 1941. He transferred to the air staff responsible for operations at Headquarters RAF Bomber Command in October 1941 and became Group Captain responsible for operations there in May 1942. Promoted to wing commander on a war substantive basis on 9 November 1942, he was mentioned in despatches again on 1 January 1943. He became Station Commander at RAF Waddington in April 1943 and was mentioned in despatches yet again on 14 January 1944. In April 1944 he was made Bomber Command's Representative to Air Chief Marshal Sir Arthur Tedder, who was then serving as Deputy Supreme Allied Commander, Supreme Headquarters Allied Expeditionary Force. He was, in this role, closely involved in the planning for operations to cut German rail communications. He was made Senior Air Staff Officer at No. 5 Group in August 1944: in this role he was closely involved in the sinking of the Tirpitz in November 1944. He was promoted to group captain on a war substantive basis on 22 February 1945.

After the war, Elworthy joined the staff at the Central Bombing Establishment at RAF Marham. He was appointed a Commander of the Order of the British Empire on 1 January 1946. He became Senior Air Staff Officer at No. 2 (Indian) Group in March 1947 and the first commanding officer of the Royal Pakistan Air Force Station, Drigh Road (now PAF Base Faisal) on 1 November 1947. He attended the Combined Staff College from May 1949 and was promoted to group captain on 1 July 1949. He went on to be Deputy Director of Personnel at the Air Ministry in December 1949, Station Commander at RAF Tangmere in December 1951 and Station Commander at RAF Odiham in March 1953. Appointed a Lieutenant of the Royal Victorian Order on 16 July 1953 he became Commander of the Metropolitan Sector in December 1953. Promoted to air commodore on 1 January 1956, he attended the Imperial Defence College in 1956 and became Commandant of the RAF Staff College, Bracknell, in January 1957.

Promoted to acting air vice marshal on 1 January 1957 and to air vice marshal on a substantive basis on 1 July 1957, Elworthy became Deputy Chief of the Air Staff with the acting rank of air marshal on 15 November 1959. Appointed a Companion of the Order of the Bath in the 1960 New Year Honours and promoted to air marshal on a substantive basis on 1 July 1960, he became Commander-in-Chief British Forces Arabian Peninsular in August 1960. Advanced to Knight Commander of the Order of the Bath in the 1961 New Year Honours, he became Commander-in-Chief Middle East Command (Aden), a newly formed unified command, in March 1961. He was advanced to Knight Grand Cross of the Order of the Bath in the 1962 New Year Honours.

Elworthy was made Chief of the Air Staff on 1 September 1963. As Chief of the Air Staff, he worked closely with Secretary of State Denis Healey implementing the cancellation of the TSR-2 strike aircraft and the HS681 military transport aircraft programmes. He was promoted to Marshal of the Royal Air Force on 1 April 1967 and became Chief of the Defence Staff on 4 August 1967. In this role he oversaw the evacuation from Aden in November 1967 and had to respond to the growing crisis in Northern Ireland in the late 1960s. He retired in April 1971.

== Later life ==
Elworthy was made a life peer as Baron Elworthy, of Timaru in New Zealand and of Elworthy in the County of Somerset, on 9 May 1972. He was made Constable and Governor of Windsor Castle on 13 April 1971 and became Lord Lieutenant of Greater London in 1973. He was also Chairman of the Royal Commission for the Exhibition of 1851, of the King Edward VII's Hospital for Officers and the Royal Over-Seas League as well as a Governor of Bradfield College, Wellington College and Marlborough College.

Elworthy was made a Knight Companion of the Order of the Garter on 23 April 1977. He resigned from his various posts in 1978 and returned to his native New Zealand. He was made a Freeman of the City of London and of the City of Timaru. Elworthy died at Christchurch in New Zealand on 4 April 1993.

== Family ==
In 1936 Elworthy married Audrey Hutchinson; they had three sons and one daughter. One of his sons is Air Commodore the Hon Sir Timothy Elworthy, a former Director of Royal Travel to the Queen.

== Coat of Arms ==
Coat of arms of Charles Elworthy, Baron Elworthy, KG, GCB, CBE, DSO, LVO, DFC, AFC
| Notes The arms of Charles Elworthy consist of: Coronet An Baron's Coronet Crest A steel cap proper rimmed studded and garnished and with a comb from the rear to the crown Or. Escutcheon Azure, a lion passant per pale Or and Argent between two bars per pale Argent and Or in chief three besants. Supporters On either side a New Zealand Kotuku proper gorged with an Astral Crown per pale Argent and Or pendent therefrom by a ring a double-warded Key Or. Motto FIDE ET SEDULITATE (By Faith and Attention to Duty) Orders Order of the Garter circlet (Appointed 1977) |

Military offices
| Preceded by Roy Faville | Commandant of the RAF Staff College, Bracknell; 1957–1959 | Succeeded by Maurice Heath |
| Preceded by Sir Geoffrey Tuttle | Deputy Chief of the Air Staff; 1959–1960 | Succeeded by Sir Ronald Lees |
| Preceded by Sir Hubert Patch | Air Officer Commanding British Forces Arabian Peninsula; 1960–1961 | Post disbanded |
| New title Joint command established | Commander-in-Chief Middle East Command (Aden); 1961–1963 | Unknown |
| Preceded by Sir Thomas Pike | Chief of the Air Staff; 1963–1967 | Succeeded by Sir John Grandy |
| Preceded by Sir Richard Hull | Chief of the Defence Staff; 1967–1971 | Succeeded by Sir Peter Hill-Norton |
Honorary titles
| Preceded by The Viscount Slim | Constable and Governor of Windsor Castle; 1971–1978 | Succeeded by Sir John Grandy |
| Preceded by Sir Gerald Templer | Lord Lieutenant of Greater London; 1973–1978 | Succeeded by The Baroness Phillips |
