= Norman Bottomley =

Royal Air Force Air Chief Marshal (1891-1970)

Sir Norman Bottomley
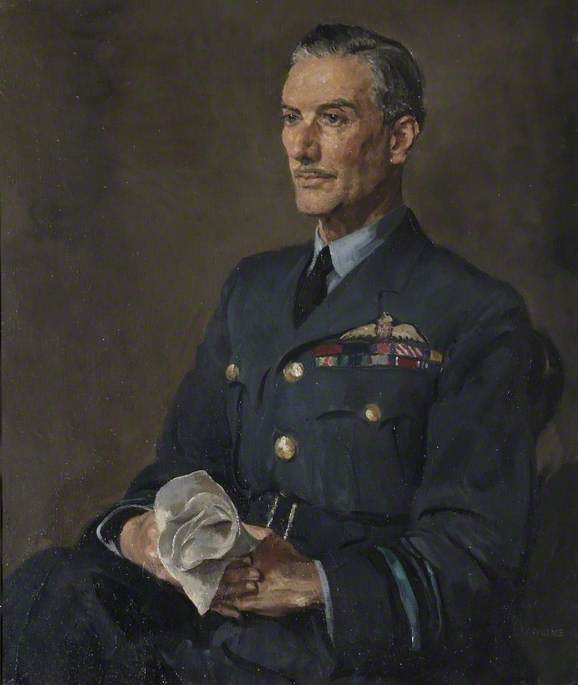
- Bottomley before 1952, by Thomas Cantrell Dugdale
- Born: 18 September 1891; Ripponden, West Riding of Yorkshire, England
- Died: 13 August 1970 (aged 78)
- Military career
- Allegiance: United Kingdom
- Branch: British Army (1914–1918); Royal Air Force (1918–1948)
- Service years: 1914–1948
- Rank: Air chief marshal
- Commands: Inspector-General of the RAF (1947); Bomber Command (1945–1947); No. 5 Group (1940–1941); No. 1 (Indian) Group (1934–1938); No. 4 Squadron (1928–1930)
- Conflicts: World War I Waziristan campaign World War II
- Awards: Knight Commander of the Order of the Bath; Companion of the Order of the Indian Empire; Distinguished Service Order; Air Force Cross; Mentioned in dispatches (5); Commander of the Legion of Merit (United States)
- Other work: Director of Administration at the BBC (1948–1956)

Air Chief Marshal Sir Norman Howard Bottomley, KCB, CIE, DSO, AFC (18 September 1891 – 13 August 1970) was the successor to Arthur 'Bomber' Harris as Commander-in-Chief of RAF Bomber Command in 1945.

== RAF career ==
Born in Ripponden, West Riding of Yorkshire, Bottomley was educated at Halifax School and the University of Rennes in Brittany before being commissioned into the East Yorkshire Regiment in 1914 during World War I. He served with his Regiment until transferring to the Royal Flying Corps in 1915 and becoming a pilot with No. 47 Squadron.

Between the wars, Bottomley's appointments included service in the Middle East and the command of No. 4 (AC) Squadron RAF from 1928 and No. 1 (Indian) Group from 1934. Bottomley was Senior Air Staff Officer at Bomber Command headquarters between 1938 and 1940, continuing in that role at the start of World War II, and was then appointed Air Officer Commanding No. 5 Group in November 1940. He was moved to Deputy Chief of the Air Staff in 1941 and then Assistant Chief of the Air Staff (Operations) in 1942 before reverting to Deputy Chief of the Air Staff in 1943. On 15 September 1945, he followed Sir Arthur 'Bomber' Harris as Commander-in-Chief Bomber Command, retaining command until 16 January 1947.

Bottomley became Inspector-General of the RAF in 1947 and retired on 1 January 1948.

From 1948 until 1956, he held the post of director of administration at the BBC, acting as director general when Sir Ian Jacob was away.

Military offices
Preceded by Arthur Harris	Air Officer Commanding No. 5 Group; 1940–1941	Succeeded by John Slessor
Preceded by Arthur Harris	Deputy Chief of the Air Staff; From 3 May 1942 to 30 July 1943 the post was titled Assistant Chief of the Air Staff (Operations); 1941–1945	Succeeded by Sir Albert Durston
Preceded by Sir Arthur Harris	Commander-in-Chief Bomber Command; 1945–1947	Succeeded by Sir Hugh Saunders
Preceded by Sir Arthur Barratt	Inspector-General of the RAF; 1947	Succeeded by Sir George Pirie
