= Timothy Elworthy =

The Honourable Sir Timothy Elworthy KCVO CBE
- Born: 27 January 1938 (age 88)
- Relatives: Charles Elworthy, Baron Elworthy (father)
- Military career
- Allegiance: United Kingdom
- Branch: Royal Air Force
- Service years: 1959–2001
- Rank: Air Commodore
- Commands: RAF Leuchars (1983–85); No. 29 Squadron RAF (1977–80)
- Awards: Knight Commander of the Royal Victorian Order; Commander of the Order of the British Empire; Queen's Commendation for Valuable Service in the Air

Air Commodore Sir Timothy Charles Elworthy (born 27 January 1938) is a retired Royal Air Force (RAF) officer and courtier.

== Early life ==
Elworthy was born on 27 January 1938, the son of Flying Officer (later Marshal of the Royal Air Force) Samuel Charles Elworthy and Audrey (née Hutchinson) Elworthy. He was educated at Radley College in Oxfordshire and later gained entrance to the Royal Air Force College Cranwell.

== RAF career ==
Elworthy was commissioned into the Royal Air Force (RAF) as a pilot officer in 1959. He was promoted to flight lieutenant on 28 January 1962, squadron leader on 1 January 1968, and awarded a Queen's Commendation for Valuable Service in the Air in the 1968 New Year Honours. Promoted wing commander on 1 January 1975, he commanded No. 29 Squadron RAF and later RAF Leuchars.

After a series of command and staff positions, Elworthy was promoted to air commodore and appointed Director of Operational Requirements at the Ministry of Defence in 1987. He served in that post until he was appointed Captain of the Queen's Flight from 14 January 1989. Then, in 1995, he became Air Equerry to the Queen, serving until 2001 (he was also Director of Royal Travel from 1997 to 2001). On retirement, he was appointed a Knight Commander of the Royal Victorian Order, having previously been appointed to Commander grade in the 1995 Birthday Honours. He had also been appointed a Commander of the Order of the British Empire in 1986 New Year Honours, and was awarded the New Zealand 1990 Commemoration Medal in 1990.
