= Light Cavalry HAC =

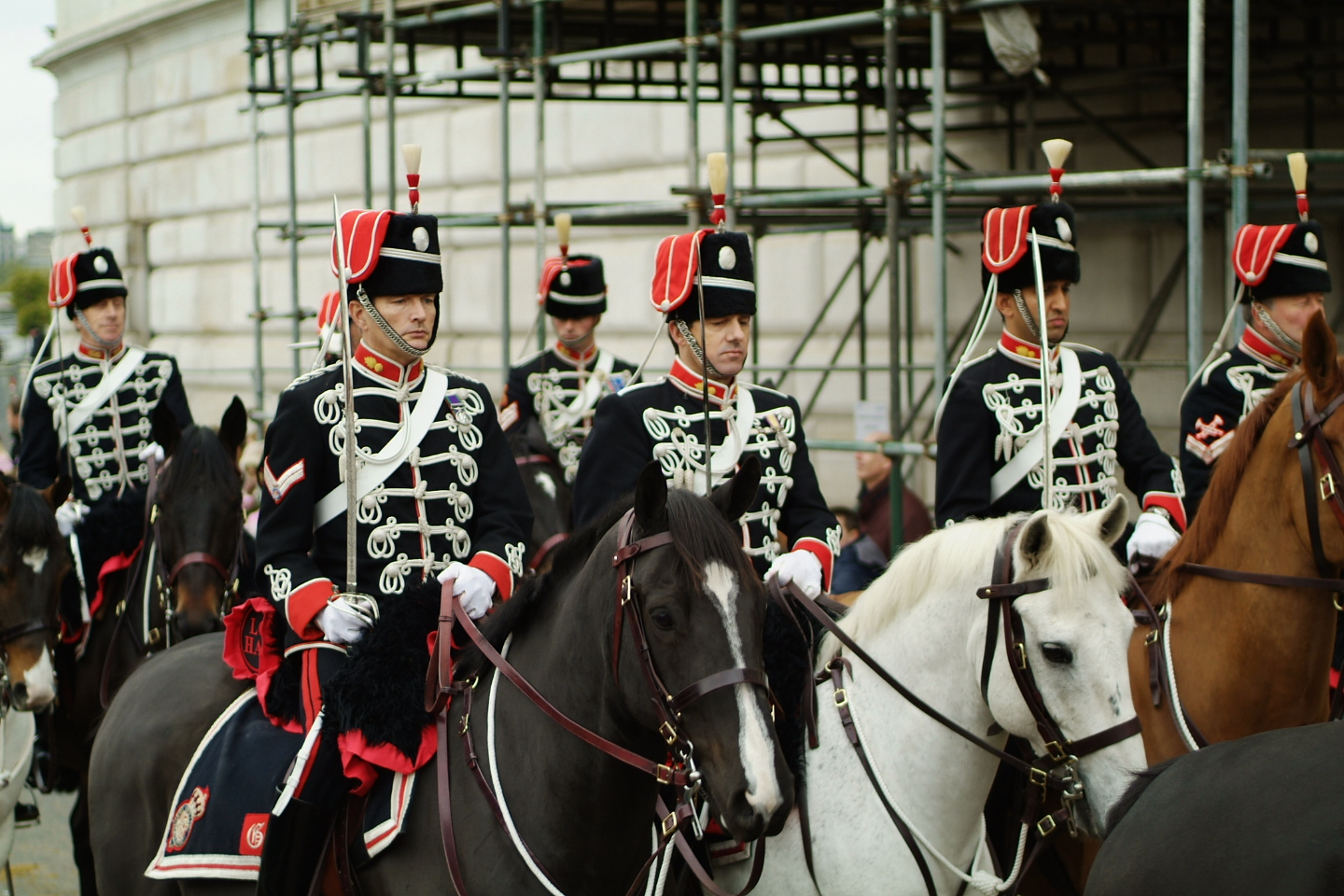
- Allegiance: United Kingdom
- Branch: British Army
- Role: ceremonial unit

The Light Cavalry HAC is a Ceremonial sub-unit of the Honourable Artillery Company (HAC). Established in 1861 as an active military unit, the Light Cavalry was reestablished in 1979 as a uniformed civilian ceremonial unit for special events. The Light Cavalry are primarily based at Armoury House in London with horses stabled in Windsor Great Park.

== History ==
The Light Cavalry were originally formed in 1861 to act as mounted reconnaissance for the gun batteries. Apart from its military duties, the Light Cavalry formed the official mounted escort for the Lord Mayor of the City of London. The Light Cavalry paraded for Princess Alexandra's visit to the city in 1861, the state visit of Tsar Alexander II in 1874 and was reviewed by Queen Victoria at Buckingham Palace and in Windsor Castle in the 1880s. In 1890 the Light Cavalry Troop were converted into a unit of Horse Artillery by order of the War Office and was renamed A Battery HAC, taking precedence over the HAC's existing field Battery.

== Current incarnation ==
In 1979 a new ceremonial Light Cavalry unit was formed within the HAC. Its chief proponent was Major Gerald Flint-Shipman, an officer in the Territorial Army Royal Green Jackets and non-regimental member of the HAC, who became its first commander. The Light Cavalry was granted a Royal Warrant from Queen Elizabeth II in 2004. As of 2020 the Light Cavalry comprises a headquarters and two Troops, each of three sections.

The Light Cavalry wear full dress in the pattern of a mid-19th century Hussar uniform, with silver lace and red facings. A busby (traditional hussar headdress) is worn with ceremonial mounted and dismounted review order. In addition, members may also be seen in frock coat order, mess kit and barrack dress on drill nights.

== Duties ==
A Royal Warrant granted by Elizabeth II in 2004 tasks the Light Cavalry with providing a ceremonial bodyguard for the Lord Mayor and Lady Mayoress of the City of London. The Light Cavalry escorts the Lady Mayoress’s Coach during the annual Lord Mayor's Show. Other duties include providing mounted and dismounted guards of honour for members of the royal family, civic dignitaries including the lord mayor and lady mayoress, City of London Livery Companies, as well as other institutions, equestrian events, balls, dinners, and film premieres. Military equestrian skills are taught and practiced by the Light Cavalry, preserving military drills of a Victorian cavalry unit. Members regularly participate in skill-at-arms and military equestrian events. Full instruction is given in the use of traditional cavalry weapons of the era, the sword and lance.

== Membership ==
Membership of the Light Cavalry is open to all ranks of any Service. Members are unpaid but give freely of their own time for drill practice and rehearsals as well as for official duties.

== Supporting Riders Club ==
The Light Cavalry also has a Supporting Riders Club based at their stables in Windsor Great Park. Here lessons and hacks are available to members of the club which is open to both members and non-members civilians as well as military. Supporting Riders also assist the Light Cavalry on parades such as the Lord Mayor’s Show.
