= Sean Reynolds (RAF officer) =

English RAF officer

Air Marshal Sean Reynolds CB CBE DFC
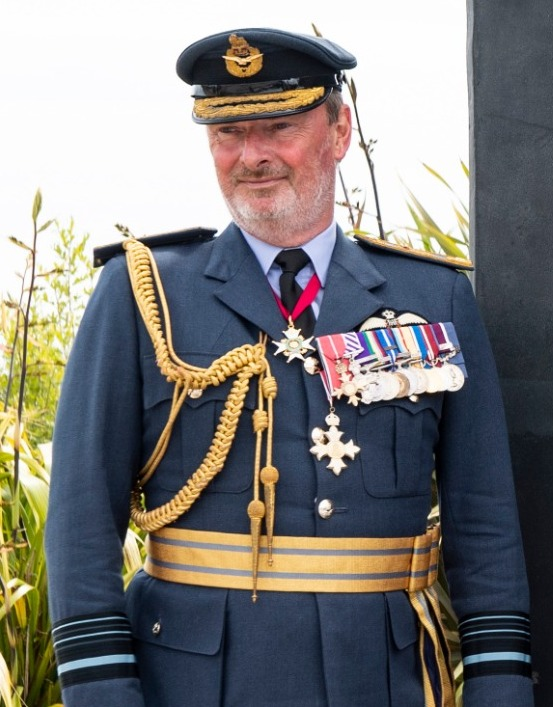
- Air Marshal Reynolds in 2021
- Military career
- Allegiance: United Kingdom
- Branch: Royal Air Force (1984–2018); Royal Auxiliary Air Force (2018–)
- Service years: 1984–present
- Rank: Air Marshal
- Commands: No. 2 Group (2013–15); RAF Odiham (2005–07); No. 27 Squadron (2002–03)
- Conflicts: Gulf War; War in Afghanistan; Iraq War
- Awards: Companion of the Order of the Bath; Commander of the Order of the British Empire; Distinguished Flying Cross; Queen's Commendation for Valuable Service

Air Marshal Sean Keith Paul Reynolds, CB, CBE, DFC, is a senior Royal Auxiliary Air Force officer who serves as Air Officer for Northern Ireland.

== RAF career ==
Reynolds was commissioned into the Royal Air Force on 8 June 1984. He was awarded the Distinguished Flying Cross for service during the Gulf War. He became station commander at RAF Odiham in September 2005.

He went on to be Director of Finance and Military Capability (Air) in April 2009, Director of Strategy Management at the Ministry of Defence in March 2011, and Air Officer Commanding No. 2 Group in January 2013. He was appointed Deputy Commander (Personnel) at RAF Air Command in May 2016. He retired from the Royal Air Force on 20 December 2018. He became Air Officer Northern Ireland as a member of the Royal Air Force Reserve on 1 January 2019. In late 2023 his service was extended to 2027.

Reynolds was appointed an Officer of the Order of the British Empire in recognition of services in Afghanistan on 29 April 2003, and advanced to Commander of the Order of the British Empire in the 2008 Birthday Honours. He was appointed a Companion of the Order of the Bath in the 2019 New Year Honours.

Military offices
Preceded by Philip Osborn	Air Officer Commanding No. 2 Group; 2013–2015	Succeeded by Gavin Parker
Preceded by Barry North	Deputy Commander-in-Chief Personnel Air Command; Air Member for Personnel; 2016–2017	Succeeded by Mike Wigston
