= Michael Wigston =

British air marshal

Air Chief Marshal Sir Michael Wigston KCB CBE
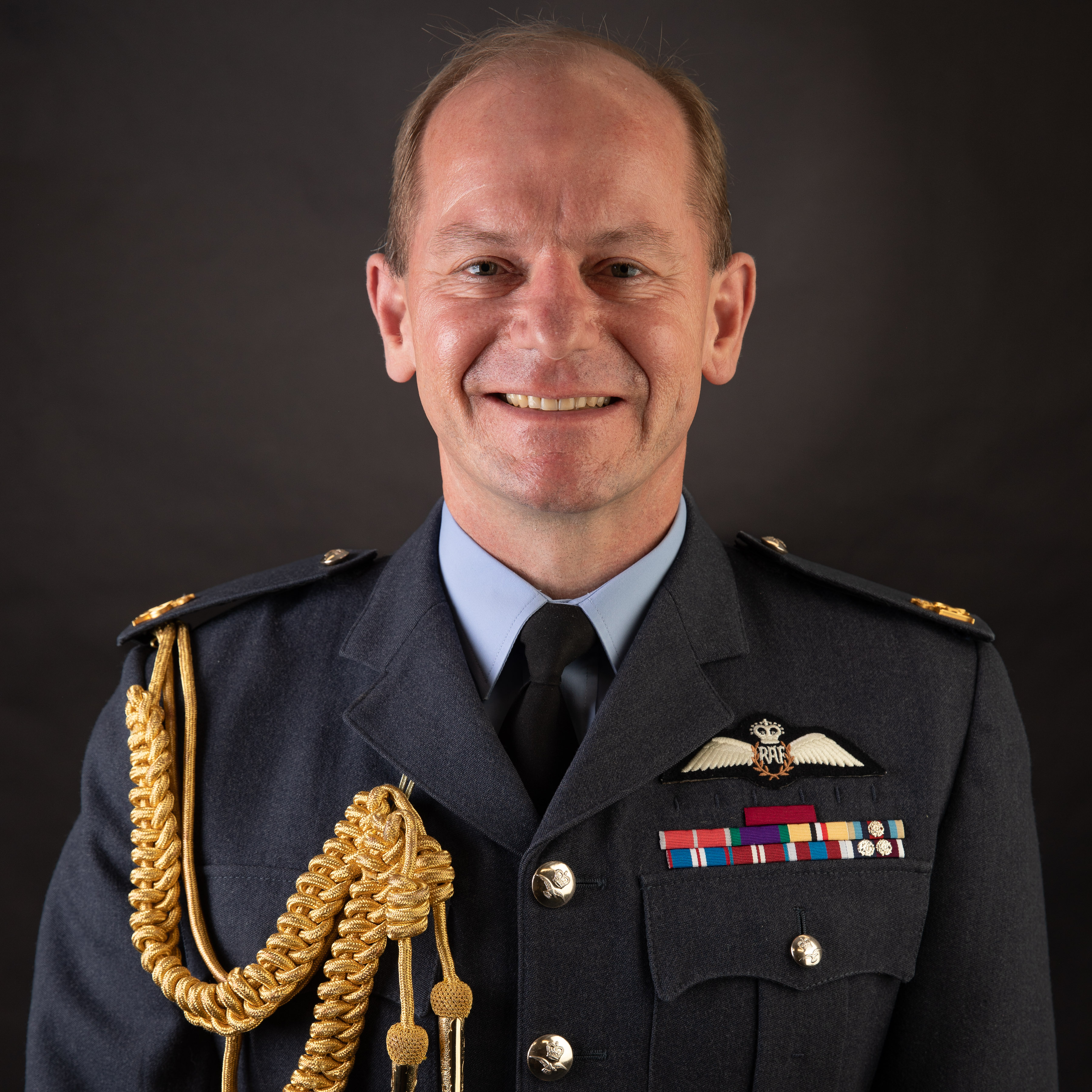
- Air Chief Marshal Wigston in 2022
- Born: 25 February 1968 (age 58)
- Alma mater: Oriel College, Oxford; King's College London
- Military career
- Allegiance: United Kingdom
- Branch: Royal Air Force
- Service years: 1986–2023
- Rank: Air Chief Marshal
- Commands: Chief of the Air Staff (2019–2023); British Forces Cyprus (2015–17); No. 903 Expeditionary Air Wing (2008); No. 12 Squadron (2005–07)
- Conflicts: War in Afghanistan; Iraq War
- Awards: Knight Commander of the Order of the Bath; Commander of the Order of the British Empire

Air Chief Marshal Sir Michael Wigston, KCB, CBE (born 25 February 1968) is a former senior officer in the Royal Air Force, who served as Chief of the Air Staff from 26 July 2019 until 2 June 2023. He previously served as Assistant Chief of the Air Staff from 2017 to 2018, and Deputy Commander (Personnel) and Air Member for Personnel and Capability from 2018 to 2019.

== Early life and education ==
Wigston was born on 25 February 1968. He was educated at Friars School, a comprehensive school in Bangor, Wales. He studied engineering science at Oriel College, Oxford, graduating with a Bachelor of Arts (BA) degree in 1992: as per tradition, his BA was promoted to a Master of Arts (MA Oxon) degree. He later attended King's College London, graduating with a Master of Arts (MA) degree in defence studies in 2004.

== RAF career ==
Wigston was commissioned into the Royal Air Force on 23 October 1986 on a university cadetship, with the rank of acting pilot officer. He was promoted to pilot officer on 15 July 1989, to flying officer on 15 January 1990, and to flight lieutenant on 15 January 1992. Flying the Tornado GR1 and GR4, he served successively with No. II(AC) Squadron, No. 14 Squadron, and No. 31 Squadron, before returning to No. II(AC).

He was promoted to squadron leader on 1 January 2000, and to wing commander on 1 July 2003. He was given command of No. 12 Squadron in 2005, and served as commander of No. 903 Expeditionary Air Wing during a deployment to Iraq in 2007. After assignments at the Ministry of Defence, he went on to be director of air operations at the International Security Assistance Force Headquarters in Afghanistan in 2011. He was Tornado Force Commander in 2013, and then principal staff officer to the Chief of the Defence Staff from 2013 to 2015. Wigston was appointed Commander of the Order of the British Empire (CBE) in recognition of his services in Afghanistan on 22 March 2013.

Wigston was promoted to air vice-marshal on 20 January 2015, and appointed Commander British Forces Cyprus and Sovereign Base Areas Administrator (SBAA). As SBAA, he conducted a same-sex marriage ceremony in October 2016. He became Assistant Chief of the Air Staff in March 2017 and, having been promoted to air marshal on 20 August 2018, he took up the post of Deputy Commander (Personnel) and Air Member for Personnel and Capability. Wigston handed over this appointment in May 2019.

Wigston was promoted to air chief marshal and become Chief of the Air Staff, the professional head of the RAF, in succession to Sir Stephen Hillier on 26 July 2019. Wigston was appointed Knight Commander of the Order of the Bath (KCB) in the 2020 Birthday Honours. In late 2021, his term of office as Chief of the Air Staff was extended from the usual three years to four years. Wigston was replaced by Sir Richard Knighton as professional head of the RAF on 2 June 2023.

=== Criticism over diversity targets ===
Wigston became Chief of the Air Staff in July 2019. He made promoting diversity a high priority and denoted the level of complaints by female and BAME military staff as of "serious concern".

In April 2023, Sky News obtained a leaked transcript of Wigston saying he would "test the limits of the law" to fast-track the promotion of women and ethnic minorities over white male employees, labelling them as "useless white male pilots," as part of his personal campaign to "broaden diversity." After it was revealed that the former RAF head of recruitment had identified, as a result of said policy "around 160 cases" of discrimination against white men, Wigston admitted to "mistakes and failings." Called before a House of Commons Committee, in February 2023, Wigston apologised for these mistakes. Despite his policy's reported risks to national security and preparedness, he did not immediately resign from his position. Later in 2023, however, and despite having some three more years until the designated end of his term of office, Wigston resigned.

== Personal life ==
Wigston and his wife Kate, a solicitor, they have two children. He is a Vice Patron of the Royal Air Force Charitable Trust and President of the RAF Rowing Association. In his spare time, he enjoys sailing.

Since January 2024, Wigston has been a visiting professor at the Freeman Air and Space Institute, King's College London.

Military offices
Preceded by Richard Cripwell	Commander British Forces Cyprus; 2015–2017	Succeeded by James Illingworth
Preceded by Rich Knighton	Assistant Chief of the Air Staff; 2017–2018	Succeeded by Gerry Mayhew
Preceded by Sean Reynolds	Deputy Commander-in-Chief Personnel Air Command; Air Member for Personnel; 2018–2019	Succeeded by Andrew Turner
Preceded by Sir Stephen Hillier	Chief of the Air Staff; 2019–2023	Succeeded by Sir Richard Knighton
