= Air Force Board =

Governing body of the Royal Air Force

- Car flag of RAF members of the Air Force Board

Agency overview
- Formed: 1 April 1964
- Preceding agency: Air Council
- Jurisdiction: Government of the United Kingdom
- Headquarters: Whitehall, Westminster, London
- Employees: 5,000 Civil Servants
- Annual budget: £6 billion
- Minister responsible: Wes Streeting, Secretary of State for Defence Air Force Board Chairman
- Parent committee: Defence Council
- Child agency: Royal Air Force

The Air Force Board of the Defence Council is responsible for the management of the Royal Air Force.

Prior to the creation of the current UK Ministry of Defence in 1964, the administration of the RAF and its personnel was undertaken by the Air Force Council, part of the Air Ministry. In 1964, the Defence Council took over this role, but the day-to-day management of the three services was delegated to the three single service boards, of which the Air Force Board is one.

== Membership of the Board ==
The composition is as follows:

- Civilian
  - Secretary of State for Defence
  - Parliamentary Under-Secretary of State for the Armed Forces
  - Minister of State for Defence Procurement and Industry
  - Parliamentary Under-Secretary of State for Veterans and People
  - Director of Resources
  - Second Permanent Under-Secretary of State for Defence (Secretary of the Air Force Board)
- Military
  - Chief of the Air Staff
  - Deputy Chief of the Air Staff
  - Air and Space Commander
  - Assistant Chief of the Air Staff
  - Air Member for Materiel

== See also ==
- Army Board
- Admiralty Board (United Kingdom)
