= Navy Department (Ministry of Defence) =

British Ministry of Defence department

Department overview
- Formed: 1964
- Preceding Department: Admiralty
- Dissolved: 1997
- Jurisdiction: United Kingdom
- Headquarters: Ministry of Defence, Whitehall, London
- Department executives: * Minister of Defence for the Royal Navy (1964–1967); Parliamentary Under-Secretary of State for Defence for the Royal Navy (1967–1981); Parliamentary Under-Secretary of State for the Armed Forces (1981–1990); Parliamentary Under-Secretary of State for Defence (1991–1997); * First Sea Lord and Chief of Naval Staff, (1964–1997)
- Parent department: Ministry of Defence (United Kingdom)

The Navy Department was a former ministerial service department of the British Ministry of Defence responsible for the control and direction of His Majesty's Naval Service. It was established on 1 April 1964 when the Admiralty was absorbed into a unified Ministry of Defence, where it became the Navy Department. Political oversight of the department originally lay with the Minister of Defence for the Royal Navy (1964–1967) it then passed to the parliamentary under-secretary of state for defence for the Royal Navy (1967–1981), then later to the parliamentary under-secretary of state for the Armed Forces (1981–1990), and finally the parliamentary under-secretary of state for defence (1991–1997).

The department's military head was the First Sea Lord and Chief of Naval Staff (1964–1997), who was responsible for managing the day-to-day operations of the department. Following restructuring in 1997, the individual Navy Department was abolished and its functions were transferred to the new Royal Navy (now Navy) operational branch of the Ministry of Defence.

== History ==
In 1959 the newly appointed Chief of the Defence Staff, Louis Mountbatten, implemented major changes with regards to defence policy one of which was the proposal to abolish the three existing service ministries the Admiralty, Air Ministry, War Office and recommended their staff and functions be absorbed into a new but enlarged Ministry of Defence, as separate Air, Army and Navy Departments but under the control of the new Defence Council and administered by the Defence Board (committee) and Defence Secretariat. On 1 April 1964 the Admiralty was absorbed in the unified Ministry of Defence, where it became the Navy Department.

The new unified Defence Ministry was a milestone in a period of increasing pressure to improve efficiency and effectiveness of triservice administrative functions. It was mostly organised on a joint rather than an 'integrated' or 'functional' basis in that sections of the Naval, Army and Air Staffs with similar responsibilities remained separate within their own departments, but were brought together in joint committees. The new organisation included three ministers of state who headed and implemented policy within the Navy, Army and Air Departments. The minister of defence for the Royal Navy (1964–1967) had responsibilities across the whole of the defence field for international policy, personnel and logistics, and research development and production, although they did not have executive responsibilities that remained with the Secretary of State for Defence. The minister of state for the Royal Navy was assisted by a parliamentary under-secretary of state for defence for the Royal Navy (1964–1981) and a civil servant the second permanent under-secretary for the Royal Navy.

In 1967 saw a re-organisation of the ministry aimed at moving towards a functional rather than service based structure. The three single-service ministerial posts were replaced by two functional ministerial positions: minister of defence (administration) (1967–1970) responsible for managing personnel and logistics for the entire defence establishment. He was assisted by chief adviser, personnel and logistics. Minister of defence (equipment) (1967–1970) responsible for managing research, development, production, procurement and sales. He was assisted by chief adviser (projects), formerly the chief scientific adviser. The positions of head of defence sales and deputy under secretary of state (equipment) were created to assist the minister of defence (equipment) in general questions of research and development, procurement and production and sales.

The three single-service departments, second permanent under secretaries were replaced by two functional second permanent under secretaries, for administration and equipment, and ministerial responsibility for the single-service departments was delegated to the parliamentary under secretaries of state. The Navy Department was then brought under the control of the parliamentary under-secretary of state for defence for the Royal Navy. During the previous six years there had been a shift to a more centralised Ministry of Defence and gradually moving accountability away from the single-service departments. In 1970 the Heath ministry moved to reverse this trend through the appointment of three single-service parliamentary under secretaries of state appointed under one minister of state, the minister of state for defence (1970–1981).

In May 1981 the office of the minister of state for defence was separated and his previous procurement responsibilities led to the creation of a new minister of defence procurement whilst his former logistical responsibilities were handed over to a new minister of state for the Armed Forces. At the same time the under-secretaries of state for the Army and Royal Air Force together with the parliamentary under-secretary of state for defence for the Royal Navy were unified into a single post of Parliamentary Under-Secretary of State for the Armed Forces who now had overall responsibility for the three service departments and in 1990 his title was changed to Parliamentary Under-Secretary of State for Defence.

In January 1997 the Navy Department as a service department with ministerial oversight ended and integrated into a new operating structure as an organisational grouping "Ministry of Defence (Royal Navy)", along with "Ministry of Defence (Army)", "Ministry of Defence (Airforce)", and "Ministry of Defence (Staffs)". In 2005 the grouping "MOD (Royal Navy)" was changed to "MOD (Navy)".

During this period of transition the majority of directorates from the previous department remained under supervision of the First Sea Lord whilst others were distributed under the Defence Staff) (1964–1995) that was later given a new organisational grouping name the "Central Staffs" (1996–2005) In 2006 greater accountability and control over budgets, equipment and staffing led to the formation new organisational groups, Central Staffs became Central Top Level Budget (CTLB) whilst Ministry of Defence (Navy) was renamed Fleet Top Level Budget. A Top Level Budget (TLB) is a major organisational group of the MOD. In 2010 Fleet Top Level Budget was renamed Navy Command following the merger of the Commander-in-Chief Fleet and the Commander-in-Chief, Naval Home Command (Royal Navy). Navy Command is currently the Top Level Budget (holder) for the Royal Navy.

== Ministers ==
This first office holders role was a continuation of the former First Lord of the Admiralty, though now a non-cabinet position who acted as chairman of the admiralty board on behalf of the secretary of state for defence. Prior to 1967 the Navy Department's parliamentary under secretary of state was deputy under the minister of state at the time his roles establishment it was a continuation of the office of the Civil Lord of the Admiralty after 1967 his role was elevated and he became the chairman of the admiralty board.

| No. | Post holder | Period | Notes | Ref |
|---|---|---|---|---|
| 1. | Minister of Defence for the Royal Navy | 1964–1967 | (Member of the Defence Council and Chairman of the Admiralty Board | |
| 2. | Parliamentary Under-Secretary of State for Defence for the Royal Navy | 1967–1981 | (Member of the Defence Council | |
| 3. | Parliamentary Under-Secretary of State for the Armed Forces | 1981–1990 | (Member of the Defence Council | |
| 4. | Parliamentary Under-Secretary of State for Defence | 1991–1997 | (Member of the Defence Council | |

== Naval staff ==
Staff
| No. | Post holder | Period | Notes |
|---|---|---|---|
| 1. | First Sea Lord and Chief of the Naval Staff | 1964–1997 | Military head of Navy Department. Leads the Naval Staff and is a Member of Defence Council, Admiralty Board and is Chairman of the Navy Board. |
| 2. | Second Sea Lord and Chief of Naval Personnel | 1964–1997 | Head of navy personnel and administers naval shore establishments and is a member of the Admiralty Board and Navy Board |
| 3. | Commander-in-Chief Fleet | 1964–1997 | Leads Fleet Command and is a member of the Admiralty Board and Chairman of the Navy Board |
| 4. | Commander-in-Chief, Naval Home Command | 1964–1997 | Leads Naval Home Command and is member of the Admiralty Board and Navy Board |
| 5. | Controller of the Navy | 1964–1997 | Leads the Controllers Department and is member of the Admiralty Board and Navy Board |
| 6. | Chief of Fleet Support | 1964–1997 | Leads Naval Support Command and is a member of the Admiralty Board and Navy Board |
| 7. | Vice Chief of the Naval Staff | 1964–1985 | Acts as deputy to the chief of Naval Staff and is a member of the Defence Council, Admiralty Board and Navy Board |
| 8. | Deputy Chief of the Naval Staff | 1964–1968 | Acts as deputy to the chief of Naval Staff and is a member of the Admiralty Board and is Navy Board |
| 9. | Assistant Chiefs of the Naval Staff | 1964–1997 | Acted as assistants to the chief of Naval Staff and were members of Admiralty Board and Navy Board. |

The assistant chiefs of Naval Staff for the duration of the Navy Departments existence included ACNS, ACNS (Policy), ACNS (Operations), ACNS Operational Requirements, ACNS (Operations and Air) and ACNS (Warfare).

== Civil servants ==
This office holders role was a continuation of the former Permanent Secretary to the Admiralty.

| No. | Post holders | Period | Notes | Ref |
|---|---|---|---|---|
| 1. | Second Permanent Under-Secretary of State (Royal Navy) | 1964–1969 | Member of the Defence Council and Admiralty Board. | |
| 2. | Second Permanent Under- Secretary of State (Administration) | 1970–1997 | ditto | |

== Governance ==
Executive governance of the Navy Department was managed by several committees usually consisted of the above officials listed to the boards and offices they were appointed to.

| No. | Committees | Period | Notes | Ref |
|---|---|---|---|---|
| 1. | Defence Council | 1964–1997 | Provides the formal legal basis for the conduct of defence in the UK is chaired by the secretary of state, and its members are ministers, the senior officers and senior civilian officials | |
| 2. | Defence Board | 1964–1997 | Chaired by the secretary of state and is responsible for top-level leadership and management across defence. The Defence Board is the highest committee in the Ministry of Defence (MOD). | |
| 3. | Admiralty Board | 1964–1997 | A committee under the Defence Council of the United Kingdom for the administration of the Navy Department. It was originally chaired by a minister of state and later parliamentary under-secretary of state on behalf of the secretary of state. It met formally only once a year. | |
| 4. | Navy Board | 1964–1997 | The service executive committee of the Admiralty Board responsible for the day-to-day running of the Royal Navy it did not include Ministers | |

== Sources ==
1. Benbow, Dr Tim (2013). British Naval Aviation: The First 100 Years. Farnham, England: Ashgate Publishing, Ltd. p. 179. ISBN 9781409482369.
2. "CIVILIAN WORKFORCE BY GRADE EQUIVALENCE AND BUDGETARY AR" (PDF). assets.publishing.service.gov.uk. London England: Ministry of Defence, Defence Analytical Services & Advice.
3. Harding, Richard (2005). The Royal Navy, 1930-2000: Innovation and Defence. London, England: Psychology Press.ISBN 9780714657103.
4. Hayman, Charles (2014). The Armed Forces of the United Kingdom 2014–2015. Barnsley, England: Pen and Sword. ISBN 9781783463510.
5. Howard, Ed. B.M. (1981). "Chapter III Ministers and Departments: Ministry of Defence". The Civil Service Yearbook. London, England: HM Stationery Office. ISBN 9780116304391.
6. Hart, F. G. (1991). "Chapter III Ministers, Departments and Executive Agencies: Ministry of Defence". Civil Service Yearbook. London, England: H.M.S.O. ISBN 9780114300470.
7. Jones, Matthew (2017). The Official History of the UK Strategic Nuclear Deterrent: Volume I: From the V-Bomber Era to the Arrival of Polaris, 1945-1964. Abingdon, United Kingdom: Taylor & Francis. ISBN 9781351755405.
8. Lane, A. T. (1995). Biographical Dictionary of European Labor Leaders. Westport, Connecticut, United States: Greenwood Publishing Group. ISBN 9780313299001.
9. Mallalieu, Sir; Joseph Percival William (1927–1992). "Mallalieu, Sir Joseph Percival William, MP Archive - Archives Hub". archiveshub.jisc.ac.uk. Heritage Quay, Huddersfield, England: The University of Huddersfield.
10. "Navy Department: Admiralty Board". The Navy List. London, England: HM Stationery Office. April 1968.
11. "Navy Department: The Admiralty Board". The Navy List. London, England: H.M.Stationery Office. February 1970.
12. "Records of the Ministry of Defence". discovery.nationalarchives.gov.uk. The National Archives United Kingdom. 1808–2017.
13. "Records of Secretary's Department:Ministry of Defence, Second Permanent Under-Secretary of State (Royal Navy)'s Department". discovery.nationalarchives.gov.uk. Kew, England: The National Archives UK. 1812–1968.
14. "Royal Navy - Higher Management of The Royal Navy - The Admiralty Board - The Navy Board - n2a1 - Armed Forces". www.armedforces.co.uk. R & F Defence Publications. 1982–2019.
15. Steinberg, S. (2016). "The Commonwealth". The Statesman's Year-Book 1964-65: The One-Volume ENCYCLOPAEDIA of all nations. London, England: Springer. ISBN 9780230270930.
16. "Supplement to the London Gazette: Ministry of Defence (Navy Department)" (PDF). www.thegazette.co.uk. The London Gazeete. 1 January 1975.
17. "Supplement to the London Gazette: Ministry of Defence (Navy Department)" (PDF). www.thegazette.co.uk. The London Gazette. 11 June 1994.
18. "UK Shipowners/Managers/Operators". Lloyd's Maritime Directory. 2: 1072.
19. Wilson, Sir Richard (2000–2001). "Organisation of the Ministry of Defence". The Civil Service Yearbook. London, England: The Stationery Office. ISBN 0114301654.
20. Wilson, Sir Richard (2004). "Organisation of the Ministry of Defence". The Civil Service Yearbook. London, England: The Stationery Office. ISBN 0114301654.
