= Minister of Defence for the Royal Navy =

United Kingdom Office of the Minister of Defence for the Royal Navy
- Seal of HM Government
- Navy Department
- Style: The Right Honourable (Formal prefix); Minister of Defence for the Royal Navy
- Member of: Defence Council; Admiralty Board; Navy Board
- Seat: Westminster, London
- Appointer: The British Monarch on advice of the Prime Minister
- Term length: No fixed term
- Formation: 1964-1967
- First holder: George Jellicoe, 2nd Earl Jellicoe
- Final holder: Sir J. P. William Mallalieu

The Minister of Defence for the Royal Navy was a senior ministerial appointment of the British Government established in April 1964. The office holder was the ministerial head of the Navy Department of the Ministry of Defence, and reported to the Secretary of State for Defence.

This office replaced the former cabinet position of First Lord of the Admiralty, though this office holder was not a member of the cabinet. On 6 January 1967 this post was abolished and replaced by the Parliamentary Under-Secretary of State for Defence for the Royal Navy.

== History ==
On 25 April 1964, the functions of the Department of Admiralty was absorbed into an enlarged Ministry of Defence where it was renamed the Navy Department. The office of the First Lord of the Admiralty, the cabinet minister responsible for the admiralty was abolished. The final post holder was George Jellicoe, 2nd Earl Jellicoe, he became the first incumbent of the new office of Minister of Defence for the Royal Navy and held that position until October 1964.

At the same time the executive Board of Admiralty was abolished and replaced by a new Admiralty Board, whilst an additional subcommittee of the admiralty board was created called the Navy Board. The Minister of State for the Royal Navy was a member of both boards. In January 1967 this office was abolished and renamed Parliamentary Under-Secretary of State for Defence for the Royal Navy.

== Office Holders ==
1. George Jellicoe, 2nd Earl Jellicoe, 25 April 1964 – 19 October 1964.
2. Sir Christopher Mayhew, 19 October 1964 – 19 February 1966.
3. Sir J. P. William Mallalieu, 19 February 1966 – 6 January 1967.
