= Finance Director (Navy) =

- Incumbent; Nick Donlevy since 24 January 2019
- Navy Command (Ministry of Defence)
- Member of: Navy Board, Admiralty Board.
- Reports to: First Sea Lord
- Salary: £119,000

Finance Director (Navy), according to gov.uk, is responsible for management and decision support relating to Navy Command's delegated budget; delivery of the programming function and Portfolio Office; implementation of civilian HR policy and representation of civilian workforce dimensions in strategic decision making; conduct of ministerial and parliamentary business, corporate communications and management of the Command Secretariat.

== Finance Director (Navy) ==
On 24 January 2019 Donlevy became the Finance Director (Navy).

In March 2017 he also began working in HM Treasury as the Deputy Director, Health and Social Care.
