= George Jellicoe, 2nd Earl Jellicoe =

British army officer, politician and businessman (1918–2007)

Brigadier The Right Honourable The Earl Jellicoe KBE DSO MC PC FRS FRGS FRSGS
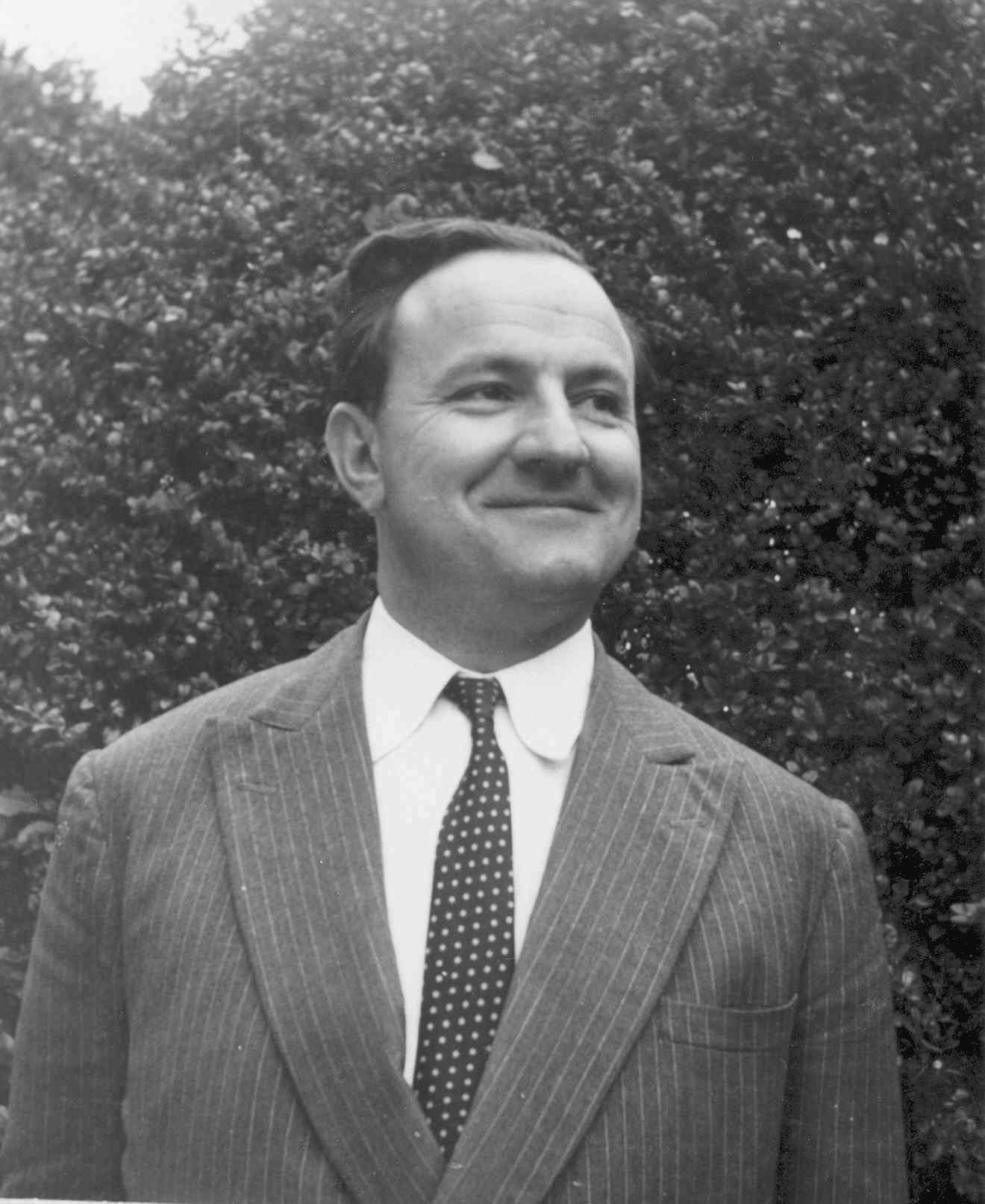
- Jellicoe in the 1960s

Leader of the House of Lords Lord Keeper of the Privy Seal
- In office 20 June 1970 – 23 May 1973
- Prime Minister: Edward Heath
- Preceded by: The Lord Shackleton
- Succeeded by: The Lord Windlesham

Minister of State for Navy
- In office 1 April 1964 – 16 October 1964
- Prime Minister: Sir Alec Douglas-Home
- Preceded by: Office established
- Succeeded by: Christopher Mayhew

First Lord of the Admiralty
- In office 22 October 1963 – 1 April 1964
- Prime Minister: Sir Alec Douglas-Home
- Preceded by: The Lord Carrington
- Succeeded by: Elizabeth II as Lord High Admiral

Minister of State for Home Affairs
- In office 17 July 1962 – 21 October 1963
- Prime Minister: Harold Macmillan
- Preceded by: David Renton
- Succeeded by: The Lord Derwent

Parliamentary Secretary to the Minister of Housing and Local Government
- In office 27 June 1961 – 16 July 1962
- Prime Minister: Harold Macmillan
- Preceded by: Keith Joseph
- Succeeded by: Frederick Corfield

Lord-in-waiting Government Whip
- In office 8 February 1961 – 27 June 1961
- Prime Minister: Harold Macmillan
- Preceded by: The Earl Bathurst
- Succeeded by: The Lord Denham

Member of the House of Lords
- Lord Temporal
- Hereditary peerage 20 November 1935 – 11 November 1999
- Preceded by: The 1st Earl Jellicoe
- Succeeded by: Seat abolished
- Life peerage 17 November 1999 – 22 February 2007

Personal details
- Born: 4 April 1918 Hatfield, Hertfordshire, England
- Died: 22 February 2007 (aged 88) Tidcombe, Wiltshire, England
- Party: Conservative
- Children: 8
- Education: Trinity College, Cambridge
- Occupation: Politician, businessman

Military service
- Allegiance: United Kingdom
- Branch/service: British Army
- Rank: Brigadier
- Unit: Coldstream Guards; Special Air Service; Special Boat Service
- Battles/wars: Second World War
- Awards: Distinguished Service Order; Military Cross; Croix de Guerre; Mentioned in Despatches (3)

George Patrick John Rushworth Jellicoe, 2nd Earl Jellicoe, Baron Jellicoe of Southampton (4 April 1918 – 22 February 2007), was a British politician, diplomat and businessman.

Lord Jellicoe was the only son but sixth and youngest child of John Jellicoe, 1st Earl Jellicoe, who was a First World War naval officer, commander at the Battle of Jutland, and Admiral of the Fleet; and his wife Florence Gwendoline (died 1964), the second daughter of Sir Charles Cayzer, 1st Bt., of Gartmore, Perthshire. He inherited the title Earl Jellicoe at the age of 17, on the death of his father. As well as commanding the Special Boat Service in the Second World War, George Jellicoe was a long-serving parliamentarian, being a member of the House of Lords for 68 years (1939–2007).

== Early life ==
Jellicoe was born at Hatfield and was christened on 29 July 1918 by the Most Rev. and Right Hon. Cosmo Lang, 89th Archbishop of York, while King George V (represented by Admiral Sir Stanley Colville) and Princess Patricia of Connaught (later known as Lady Patricia Ramsay) stood sponsor as two of his godparents. The others were: Miss Lilian Lear, Admiral Sir Lionel Halsey (Third Sea Lord), Mr. Eustace Burrows (cousin), Major Herbert Cayzer (uncle), and The Rev. Frederick G. G. Jellicoe (uncle, and Rector of New Alresford).

Much of his childhood was spent at St Lawrence Hall, near Ventnor on the Isle of Wight; at St Peter's Court, a prep school at Broadstairs, Kent; in London; and in the Dominion of New Zealand, where his father was Governor-General between 1921 and 1924. He was educated at Winchester College, where he was styled and known as Viscount Brocas. He won the Vere Herbert Smith history prize and secured an exhibition to Trinity College, Cambridge, where he secured a first class in Part I of the History tripos in 1938 and graduated with a degree in the subject the following year (which was only awarded in 1966). He was chairman of the Pitt Club, and his tutor Steven Runciman became a lifelong friend.

== Second World War ==
In October 1939, Jellicoe was a cadet in the first wartime intake at the Royal Military College, Sandhurst. He was commissioned into the Coldstream Guards on 23 March 1940, before joining No. 8 (Guards) Commando, with whom on 31 January 1941 he sailed to the Middle East with Colonel Robert Laycock's Layforce (whose commando officers included Evelyn Waugh, Randolph Churchill, Philip Dunne, Carol Mather, David Stirling, and many distinguished others). He served with L Detachment (from April 1942) (with some of the above and Stephen Hastings), which was the nucleus of the Special Air Service. He was mentioned in despatches thrice, and wounded (bullet in shoulder) once whilst with the 3rd Battalion, Coldstream Guards, in 22 (Guards) Brigade in the Western Desert in January 1941. He won the DSO, and Croix de Guerre, in November 1942 for operating on a raid that claimed to have blown up more than 20 German aircraft (Ju 88s) on Heraklion airfield, Crete, that June:

His cool and resolute leadership, skill and courage throughout this very hazardous operation were mainly responsible for the high measure of success achieved. He ... placed charges on the enemy aircraft and brought off the survivors after the four Free French members of the party had been betrayed and killed or captured.

In March 1943, he was named Commander of the Special Boat Regiment, and he was promoted to the rank of lieutenant-colonel. In September 1943, Jellicoe was sent to the Italian-held island of Rhodes to negotiate with the Italian Admiral Inigo Campioni for the surrender of his forces to the Allies. However, negotiations were pre-empted by a surprise German attack on the island on 9 September. He was able to escape from Rhodes during the resulting chaos while the Italian garrison was captured by the German invasion force. This was part of the Dodecanese Campaign. He was eventually promoted to brigadier.

For the remainder of the war, his SBS command conducted secretive and dangerous operations along the coasts of Italy and Yugoslavia. In 1944, he won the MC for one of these actions. At the end of the war, Jellicoe was among the first Allied soldiers to enter German-occupied Athens, beating the communist-controlled guerrillas ELAS, to create a pro-Allied presence in the capital.

Years later, when First Lord of the Admiralty, Jellicoe told at least one reporter, "The only serious military distinction I ever achieved was having a new type of assault boat named after me. It was called I am ashamed to say, the Jellicoe Inflatable Intruder Mark One."

In March 1944, Lord Jellicoe married Patricia Christine O'Kane (October 1917 – March 2012), who was employed at the British Embassy in Beirut. She had been born and raised in Shanghai and was the daughter of a Greenock-born Irish father and an English mother. Patricia, Countess Jellicoe (popularly known as Patsy Jellicoe), would remain married to Lord Jellicoe until 1966, when they divorced. They had two sons and two daughters together, the eldest son being the 3rd Earl Jellicoe.

== HM Foreign Service 1947–1958 ==
Soon after the war, Lord Jellicoe joined His Majesty's Foreign Service (appointed a Foreign Service Officer, Grade 8, in the Senior Branch of the Foreign Service, 10 September 1947). He served in London (German political department, Third Secretary); Washington (Third Secretary, when Donald Maclean of the Cambridge five was Head of Chancery, and then as one of the 11 Second Secretaries with H. A. R. Philby, seeing the North Atlantic Treaty signed on 4 April 1949, all when Sir Oliver Franks was Ambassador); transferred to Brussels 10 September 1951 (Head of Chancery) acted as Chargé d'Affaires in 1952); London (no. 2 in Northern department in charge of the Soviet Desk from September 1953); and Baghdad from January 1956 (First Secretary and Deputy Secretary General of the Baghdad Pact Organisation). The Suez Crisis (from July 1956) wrecked everything the Pact was trying to achieve; Jellicoe was appalled by British policy and came close to resigning (L. Windmill p. 136).

Jellicoe eventually left the Foreign Office in March 1958, after marital difficulties had caused an impasse (February 1958, Permanent Secretary Sir Derek Hoyar-Millar wrote: 'You have a choice of ceasing your relationship with this lady [Philippa Dunne] or changing your job'). He became a director of the Cayzer dynasty's Clan Line Steamers (cargo ships), and Union Castle Steamship Co. (passengers).

However, enthusiasm for his mother's family's businesses ultimately gave way to the call of the Palace of Westminster, where, back from Iraq, he took the Oath in the Lords on 3 December 1957, in the Third Session of the 41st Parliament.

== House of Lords and 1960s ==
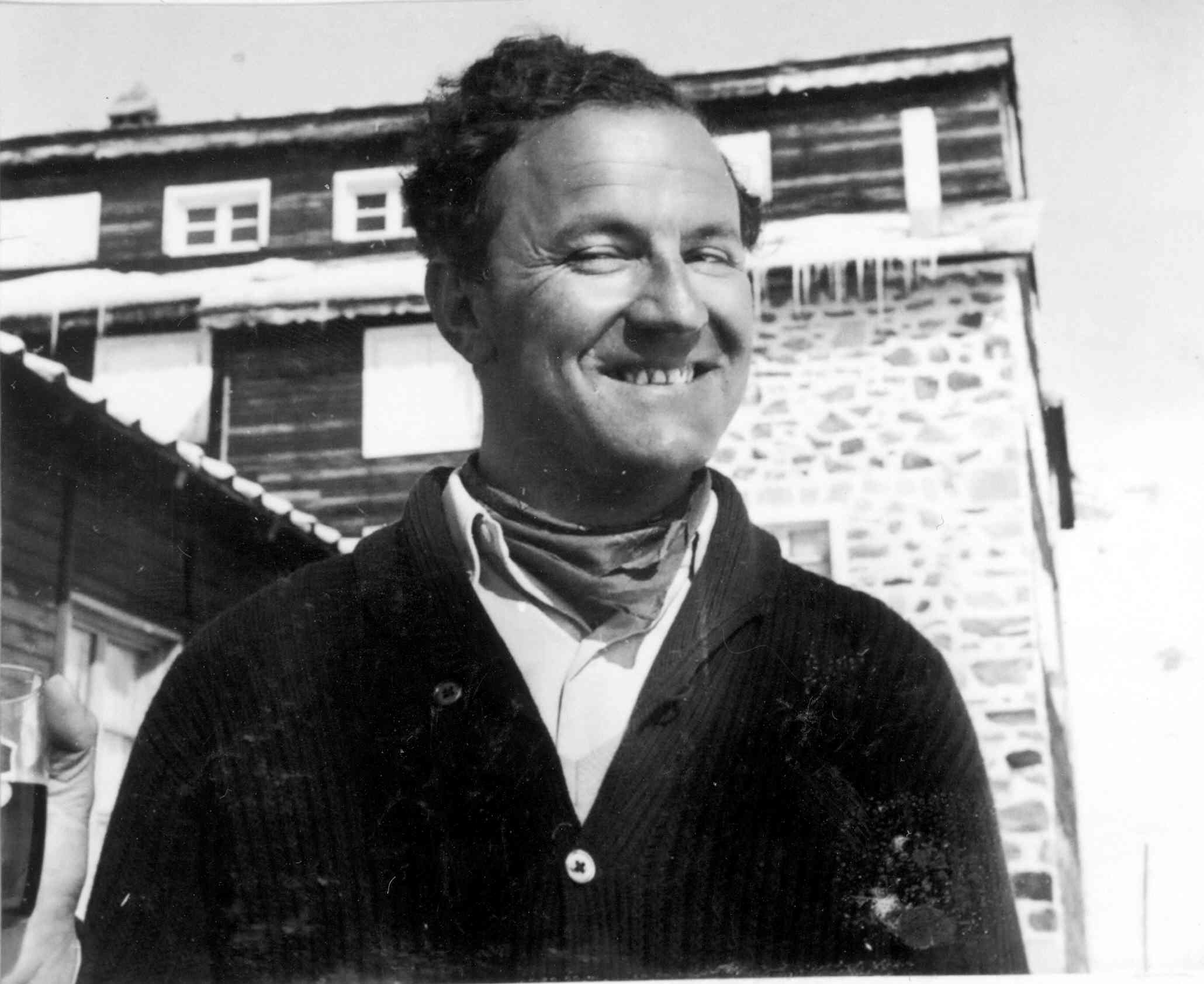
Jellicoe during a skiing holiday.

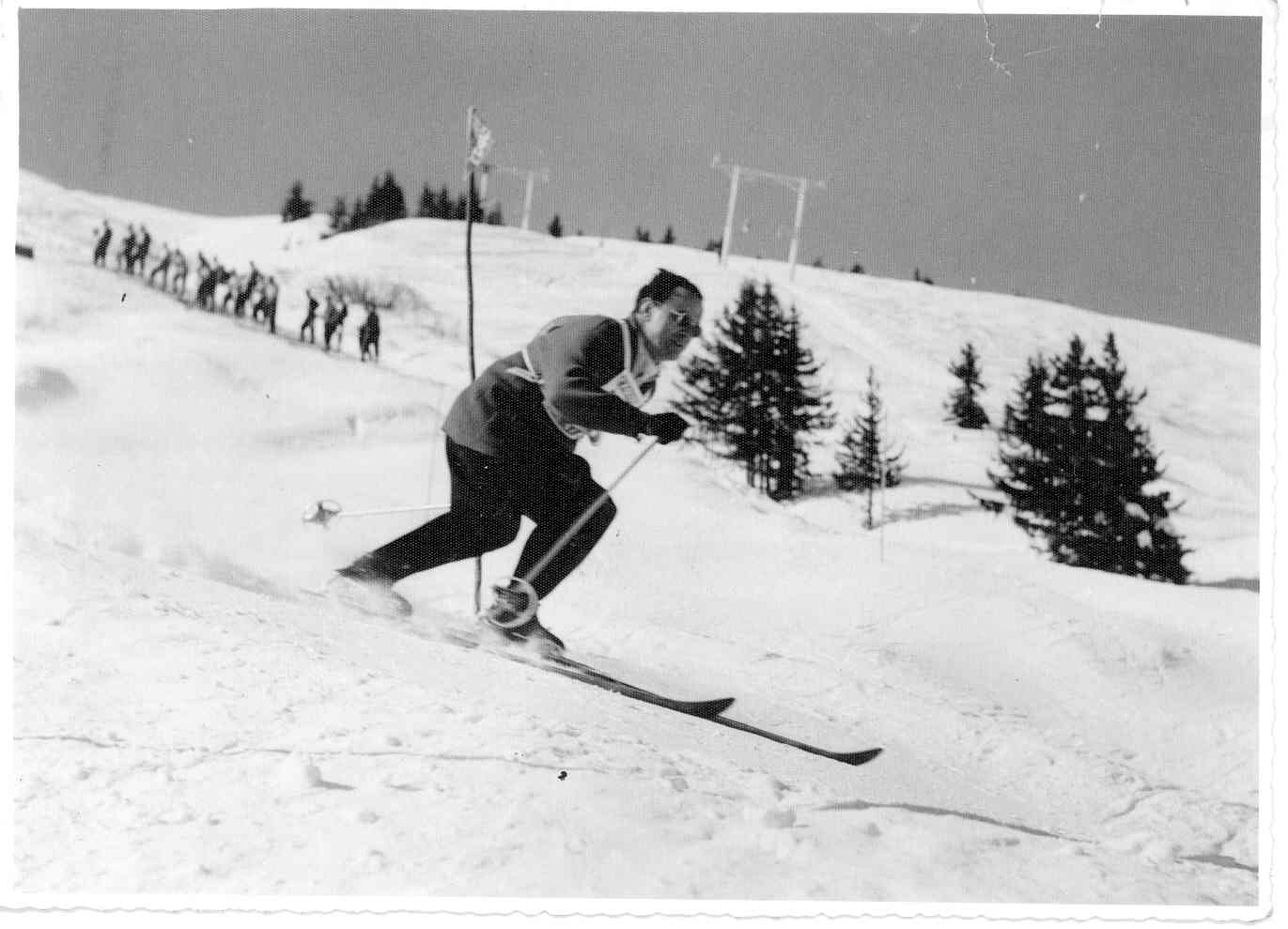
Jellicoe skiing in France.

Having first sat in parliament on 25 July 1939, Jellicoe waited until 28 July 1958 to make his maiden speech in the House of Lords during a debate entitled "The International Situation: The Middle East". He spoke from the Cross-Benches about the Baghdad Pact and Iraq:

... Having lately lived for a year or so in Baghdad I confess that I have not been untouched by the charm of that ugly yet fascinating city, and, if I may say so, of the diverse peoples of Iraq ... Like all your Lordships, I felt, and feel, a deep sense of shock, indeed revulsion, at the brutal butchery of the young King and his family, and of that great, and greatly human, statesman, Nuri Pasha. I have also been shocked by the tendency which one sees current at the moment to write off the Nuri regime as decadent, feudal and corrupt. That picture, in my view, is a travesty of the truth ... As part of the admirable development programme which the Nuri regime was carrying through there was a large schools programme. These schools were built for the purpose your Lordships might expect-to educate Iraqis in. But the Iraqis did not believe that; they thought-it was a very widespread belief which one could not eradicate-that these schools were camouflaged barracks intended for the British Army when they reoccupied Iraq. These are the sorts of 'ingrowing toenails' in the Iraqi consciousness which I feel we must try to eradicate, to draw out ...

By October 1958 he had joined the Conservatives, in the Lords a natural home for such a distinctly pink Whig, who gave him the honour of moving "an humble Address in Reply to Her Majesty's Most Gracious Speech"

My Lords, I am acutely, indeed somewhat painfully, conscious of the great honour which the noble Earl Lord Home (i.e. Alec Douglas-Home), the Leader of the House, has done me in inviting me to move the humble Address to Her Majesty. The last time that I addressed your Lordships' House was from the platonic sanctity of the Cross-Benches. I then had the aesthetic pleasure of seeing your Lordships in profile: I now have the equal pleasure of seeing some of your Lordships full face. I do not know why I find myself in this particular hot spot this afternoon. I can only surmise that the noble Earl, fishing for a good large Tory trout, cast over the Cross-Benches for an ex-Ambassador and hooked an ex-First Secretary by mistake.

On 7 May 1959, he asked a prescient starred question on the planning of motorways:

... Just as the Roman roads are with us to-day, so these great new roads may be with our successors 1,000 years hence. With this in mind, can my noble friend assure us, first, that the advice of the Advisory Committee [on the Landscape Treatment of Trunk Roads] to which he referred will in all cases in future be sought at a very early stage in the planning of these new roads; and, secondly, that permanent professional advice will be enlisted from the outset at the planning, the reconnaissance stage, in order to ensure that these great new roads blend as harmoniously as possible with the land-scape through which they pass?

On 20 July 1959, he initiated a debate on Western aid for uncommitted countries, and by January 1961 he was a Lord-in-waiting to H.M. the Queen, a Government Whip, in Macmillan's administration. He was Joint Parliamentary Secretary, Ministry of Housing and Local Government June 1961 – July 1962; Minister of State, Home Office July 1962 – October 1963; First Lord of the Admiralty October 1963 – April 1964; Minister of Defence for the Royal Navy April–October 1964; delegate to the Council of Europe and the Western European Union (WEU) 1965–1967; president of the National Federation of Housing Societies 1965–1970; a governor of the Centre for Environmental Studies 1967–1970; chairman of the British Advisory Committee on Oil Pollution at Sea 1968; chairman of the third International Conference on oil pollution of the sea 1968; an hon. vice-president of PEST (Pressure for Economic and Social Toryism); and deputy Leader of the Opposition in the Lords 1967–1970. From April 1967 Lords Jellicoe and Carrington represented the Conservatives in the Lords on the Inter-Party conference group on Lords' reform, which came up with the unsuccessful Parliament (No.2) Bill (1968–1969). Leading the debate for the (Conservative) Opposition in November 1968 Jellicoe said:

We hold that a grave constitutional change of this kind should not be brought into effect in the dying years of a discredited Government ... a viable Upper House has an essential part to play in our parliamentary structure. We now have a quite considerable constitutional prize in our grasp, the opportunity to build a really viable Upper House on the basis of a broad consensus of support from all Parties ... (19 November 1968, Hansard via L. Windmill).

During the late 1960s he worked in the City of London where he became chairman of British Reserve Insurance and a director of S G Warburg (Finance and Development) Ltd.

== Cabinet minister and resignation ==
In Ted Heath's administration he was Minister in charge for the Civil Service Department (CSD), Lord Privy Seal (as such he was eighth on the Roll of The Lords) and Leader of the House of Lords from 20 June 1970 until 24 May 1973.

Having earlier re-established relations with the miners' union leaders in February 1972, Heath appointed Jellicoe "energy supremo" to restore power supplies around the time of the Three-Day Week and had him set up and chair a Civil Contingencies Unit, which was, when an internal crisis arose, to operate through "COBRA" (Cabinet Office Briefing Rooms).

In June 1972 Jellicoe was sent to lead Concorde's first sales expedition. As Alan Trengove in My Lord, the super salesman, in the Australian The Sun of 22 June 1972 put it,

There has probably never been a sales team [122 strong] quite like the aristocratic British contingent that is trying to sell the Anglo-French supersonic Concorde to Qantas ... The earl is an astute salesman who has obviously done his homework ... He has the stamina to address a couple of press conferences each day as well as make daily speeches ... cultivate politicians, DCA personnel and Qantas bosses. At fifty-four, the earl looks a rugged character. He has a strong broad chin and speaks with a directness that appeals to Australians ... Inevitably, he is beginning to be known in Australia as 'Aeroplane Jellicoe'. If he can land the Concorde deal with Qantas, they may soon be singing in Britain:

I like Aeroplane Jellicoe
Aeroplane Jellicoe for me.
I like it for dinner, like it for tea,
Aeroplane Jellicoe has goodness for me.

Trengove considered Sir George Edwards and Sir Geoffrey Tuttle "equally impressive members of the sales team". (Supersonic flights were on the prototype Concorde G-BSST, certificate signed by Brian Trubshaw, and dated 15 June 1972.)

Jellicoe, with the help of his very experienced Chief Whip, the second Earl St Aldwyn, steered the European Communities Act (1972) through the Lords, allowing no amendments. The Industrial Relations Act was another legislative highlight.

In May 1973, Jellicoe admitted "some casual affairs" with call girls (from Mayfair Escorts) in the wake of an accidental confusion with Lord Lambton's prostitution scandal. His name seems to have emerged as a result of a connection between Lambton, the madame Norma Levy, and a tenement house or community hall in Somers Town in the London district of St. Pancras called Jellicoe Hall or House, after Basil Jellicoe (1899–1935) the housing reformer and priest. The word Jellicoe was seen in Levy's notebook, and a connection was assumed to the Minister rather than the building; a structure named after the earl's distant cousin, and one that may have been opened by the Admiral himself in June 1928.

The resignation ended Jellicoe's third career in government service. After the resignation (over his marginal involvement in a minor indiscretion) Richard Crossman, writing in The Times, 30 May 1973 (page 18), described Jellicoe as:

... among the bravest, ablest, most decent members of the Heath Government ... [B]ut need the Prime Minister have got rid of Lord Jellicoe in such peremptory style? Could he not have refused his resignation until all the facts were available?

On return from the Whitsun recess, tributes were paid in the Lords to their departed leader: the (Labour Party) Opposition leader and Jellicoe's predecessor as Lord Privy Seal, Lord Shackleton said:

Lord Jellicoe ... has been as good a leader of this House as we have known [cheers].. I don't think we can let him go – though happily this is not an epitaph – without expressing our very deep sorrow to the House and to the country [cheers] ... with immense thoroughness, patience and personal sensitivity Lord Jellicoe fulfilled his role as Leader of your Lordships House [cheers] ... we [Lords Byers and Shackleton] found him an admirable open-minded and wise colleague; my Lords, I believe that we and the country have suffered a grievous loss ... (Hansard, 5 June 1973, and The Times, 6 June 1973, for the cheers)

Lord Byers for the Liberal Party added: "we regret bitterly his resignation ... He was a reforming innovator and the House owes a great deal more than it probably knows to the interest he took in this House and to his initiatives." (Hansard, 5 June 1973)

From the cross-benches Lord Strang added:

To some of us it had been a comfort to have had Lord Jellicoe as Leader. I doubt whether he realises how much we shall miss him. We have been deeply saddened by what has happened. The outstanding record of his achievements will not be dimmed; our warm regard for him will remain. (Hansard, 5 June 1973)

William Kendall, general secretary of the Civil and Public Services Association, said:

In our union we respected him as a tough, capable and fair negotiator (quoted from The Times, 25 May 1973, page 2); or, as Daniel McGeachie (of The Daily Express) reported on 25 May 1973, He was a man in the Macmillan mould ... [H]e gave the impression of a solid and straightforward approach to life, to the cut and thrust of debate-but at the same time he was an extraordinarlily subtle person.

In July 1973, the Diplock Commission, which had been set up to look into the security implications of Lambton and Jellicoe's adventures, concluded its section on Jellicoe (paragraph 24):

... it was Lord Jellicoe's misfortune that his use of 'call girls' happened to come to light at the particular moment that it did, when the attention of the Press was focused on the private conduct of Ministers in connection with the entirely separate case of Lord Lambton.

== Business and post-government public career ==
With no estates to distract him, Jellicoe was free to re-join S. G. Warburg & Co. (1 October 1973), and with the help of Alan Lennox-Boyd, who was soon to retire from the board, he became a non-executive director of the sugar company Tate & Lyle in 1973, a position held until 1993. Thanks in the main to Sir Saxon Tate, and presumably because he had succeeded as chairman (until June 1978) of their subsidiary Tunnel Refineries, the family made him Tate & Lyle's first non-family chairman 1978–1983. Having revived and retrenched Tate & Lyle, Jellicoe became chairman of Booker Tate, 1988–91.

Other non-governmental jobs included: chairman of engineering plant company the Davy Corporation (Davy McKee) (now subsumed into Aker Kværner) 1985–1990; director Sotheby's Holdings 1973–1993; Morgan Crucible 1974–88; Smiths Industries Ltd 1973–1986; S. G. Warburg & Co 1964–1970, 1973–1988. He was president of the London Chamber of Commerce and Industry 1979–1982. He succeeded Lord Limerick as chairman of the Department of Trade and Industry's British Overseas Trade Board (BOTB) 1983–1986, for which he was knighted. That was followed by chairmanship (1986–1990) and then the presidency (1990–1995) of the East European Trade Council (EETC). He was chairman of the Greek Fund Ltd 1988–1994 (Schroders) and of European Capital Ltd 1991–1995.

Lord Jellicoe was chairman of the council of King's College London (KCL) 1974–1983; chairman of the Medical Research Council (MRC) 1982–1990; a trustee of the National Aids Trust (alongside the likes of Lord Goodman, David Puttnam and Robert Maxwell); president of the Royal Geographical Society (RGS) (and of the Institute of British Geographers (IBG) after amalgamation) 1993–1997; president of the Anglo-Hellenic League 1978–1986; president of the Kennet and Avon Canal Trust 1987–1994; president of the UK Crete Veterans Association 1991–2001; president of the British Heart Foundation (BHF) 1992–1995; chancellor of Southampton University 1984–1995, and has been closely associated with research and higher education. He was elected a Fellow of the Royal Society in 1990.

In 1995 he helped found Hakluyt & Company, a strategic intelligence and advisory firm, for which he was a director 1996–2000. He was president of the SAS Regimental Association 1996–2000, when he became its patron. Jellicoe was a member of the Onassis International Prizes Committee (1983–1992); a vice-president of The European-Atlantic Group and of the Byron Society; he was on the board of the Hellenic College London; patron of the City of Southampton Society; a patron of the Greek Archaeological Committee (UK); one of five patrons of The Community Foundation for Wiltshire and Swindon; a director of The Landscape Foundation (now dormant); patron of Friends of The Royal Hospital School; patron of the Hampshire and Wight Trust for Maritime Archaeology; a member of the World Innovation Fund (WIF) and an associate member of INEED. In 2002 he became a patron of The Second World War Experience Centre in Leeds.

== Later state contributions ==
He was chairman of the Lords' Select Committee on Committees (1990–1993) and President of the Parliamentary and Scientific Committee (1980–1983). In 1983 he was author of the Jellicoe Report which reviewed the operation of the Prevention of Terrorism (Temporary Provisions) Act 1976. The Times saw this appointment as the end of nine years penance in the political wilderness.

Between 1963 and 1973, Jellicoe had averaged 90 House of Lords daily attendances per parliamentary session. From 1973 to 1989, his attendance fell to an average of nine appearances per session. However, between 1990 and 2001, he made an average of 72 visits per session. He maintained this rate until early 2006, though his last full speech in the Lords was made as part of the Address in Reply to Her Majesty's Most Gracious Speech (the Queen's Speech debate) on 28 October 1996; his subject was Ukraine.

When the House of Lords Act 1999 removed his hereditary automatic entitlement to attend and sit in the House of Lords, he was created a life peer as Baron Jellicoe of Southampton, of Southampton in the County of Hampshire, so that he could continue to be summoned:

1. Earl Jellicoe (Lord Jellicoe of Southampton) —The Rt Hon. George Patrick John Rushworth Earl Jellicoe, having been created Baron Jellicoe of Southampton, of Southampton in the County of Hampshire, for life by Letters Patent dated 6 o'clock in the forenoon of 17th November 1999, took and subscribed the oath pursuant to statute.

Lord Jellicoe remained an active member of the House of Lords for the rest of his life. At his death in 2007, Lord Jellicoe was the longest-serving member of the House of Lords, and arguably the longest-serving parliamentarian in the world, having succeeded his father on 20 November 1935 and come of age and sat first in parliament on 25 July 1939. Because he waited until 28 July 1958 to make his maiden speech, a few peers (viz. Earl Ferrers and Lords Renton, Carrington, Healey, and Strabolgi) could have been considered to have been active parliamentarians longer. Moreover, at the time of his death, on the Privy Council only the Duke of Edinburgh (1951) and Lords Carrington (1959), Deedes and Renton (both 1962) had served longer.

== Character ==
In May 1973, at the time of his resignation from the government, a friend is quoted as saying:

If he has a fault it is because he wears his weaknesses on his sleeve. He is too frank. I suppose though, that is no bad thing. He was not flamboyant but he was a hedonist. He is the sort of non-pompous person who does not try to hide his weaknesses. (Quoted from Christopher Sweeney's article in The Times, 25 May 1973, page 2)

In July 1970, as one of the first people to be breathalized, he was banned from driving for a year and fined 75 pounds with 20 guineas costs for having consumed more than the permitted level of alcohol in Old Brompton Road at 4 a.m. on 21 March 1970. Luck saw to it that the case came after the general election and the ban coincided with the arrival of his right to a full-time government car.

In 2000, his friend, the former British Ambassador to the United States, Sir Nicholas Henderson, wrote:

George is a man of moods. He is not complicated but a many-sided character. There are in fact four Georges: there is George the First, the unabstemious, boisterous Lothario, with a leer like a roué in a Peter Arno cartoon, blessed with an iron constitution and athletic prowess that enabled him to have been on the verge of the British Olympic ski and sleigh teams; then we have Hero George, the dashing man of action, a leader who whether descending by parachute or commanding by sea, kept the enemy on tenterhooks in the Eastern Mediterranean throughout the war; thirdly, there is George the aesthete and sightseer, who, with little finger raised, will speak discerningly of paintings, mosaics and furniture, a great patron of the arts, his talent as a collector manqué only due to lack of funds, which has not prevented some bold purchases; and finally we have pensive George, scholar and public servant, concerned to promote the national interest, high-minded, cautious and conscientious ... [A] striking and irrepressible feature of that character has been his easy communion with members of the opposite sex, and this may have been prefigured by an early experience. He spent some time as a small boy in New Zealand where his father was Governor-General. George wanted to become a wolf cub, but no pack was available, so instead he joined the Brownies. He got on very well with them. (Old Friends and Modern Instances, 2000)

Lorna Windmill's biography termed Jellicoe a "British Achilles" on account of two of his careers derailing as a result of women: in the 1950s for love, and in the 1970s for escorts.

== Personal life ==
Lord Jellicoe married first, on 23 March 1944, Patricia O'Kane (1917–2012), by whom he had two sons and two daughters. He married secondly, in 1966, Philippa, daughter of Captain Philip Dunne (1904–1965), by whom he had one son and two daughters. He had eight children in total, born between 1944 and 1984. He was a member of Brooks's (from 1940), the Special Forces Club, the Ski Club of Great Britain and was a liveryman of the Worshipful Company of Mercers.

He died on 22 February 2007, aged 88, at Tidcombe Manor, his house in Wiltshire.

== Honours ==
- Page of Honour (one of nine) to King George VI at his Coronation (12 May 1937)
- Distinguished Service Order (DSO) (1942)
- Military Cross (MC) (1944)
- 1939–45 Star
- Africa Star
- Italy Star
- 1939–45 War Medal
- Légion d'honneur (France) (1945)
- Croix de Guerre (France) (1945)
- Greek Order of Honour (1950)
- Greek War Cross (1950)
- Privy Counsellor (PC) (1963)
- Freeman of the City of Athens
- Knight Commander of the Order of the British Empire (KBE) (1986)
- Honorary Citizenship of the Village of Southampton, New York (12 September 1987)
- Companion of the British Institute of Management (elected 11 October 1988)
- Hon. Admiral in the Texas Navy (1988)
- 27 October 1988 was Lord Earl Jellicoe Day in the City of Houston
- Fellow of the Royal Society (FRS) (8 November 1990)
- Grand Commander Order of Honour (Greece, 1991)
- La Medaille de la Ville de Paris (echelon vermeil), (6 June 1994)
- UK life peer (1999)
- 27 April 2001 was Earl Jellicoe Day in the City of Vancouver
- Winston S. Churchill Allied Nations Award from World War II Veterans Committee (8 November 2003, USA).
- Hon. degrees from:

- King's College London (Fellow (FKC) 1979)
- Southampton University (LLD, 1985)
- Long Island University (Doctor of Laws, 12 September 1987).

== Bibliography ==
- George Jellicoe, SAS and SBS Commander, by Nicholas Jellicoe, Pen and Sword Books Ltd, Barnsley, 2021
- Old Friends and Modern Instances, by Nicholas Henderson, Profile, 2001 (all chapter nine, pages 105–116).
- A British Achilles: The Story of George, 2nd Earl Jellicoe, by Lorna Almonds Windmill, Pen and Sword Books Ltd, Barnsley, 2006.
- Dod's Parliamentary Companion, 2007.
- Burke's Peerage, 107th edition, 2003.
- Review of the Operation of the Prevention of Terrorism (Temporary Provisions) Act 1976, by the Rt. Hon. Earl Jellicoe, DSO, MC., Command 8803, HMSO, February 1983.
- The Boxer Rebellion, The Fifth Wellington Lecture, University of Southampton, by the Rt Hon the Earl Jellicoe, KBE, DSO, MC, LLD, FRS, PC, University of Southampton, 1993.
- Lord Shackleton, by Lord Jellicoe, in Biographical Memoirs of Fellows of the Royal Society, number 45, 1999, printed by the Cambridge University Press for the Royal Society.
- Special Boat Squadron, The Story of the SBS in the Mediterranean, by Barrie Pitt, Century Publishing, London, 1983.
- The Life of John Rushworth, Earl Jellicoe, G.C.B., O.M., G.C.V.O, L.L.D., D.C.L., by Admiral Sir R. H. Bacon, K.C.B., K.C.V.O., D.S.O., Cassell, London, Toronto, Melbourne & Sydney, 1936.
- Tatler, 30 August 1939.
- News Chronicle, 30 January 1942.
- (Australian) The Sun, Alan Trengove, 22 June 1972
- International Herald Tribune, 21 February 1978. Article on Patricia, Countess Jellicoe by Naomi Barry.
- Financial Weekly, 20 April 1979, profile by Judi Bevan, page 12.
- Country Life, 1 July 1999, profile, with a photo by Derry Moore.
- Twenty-One: Coming of Age in the Second World War, by James Holland, HarperCollins, London, 2006 (whole of chapter five).
- Lord Chidgey in The House Magazine, Dods, 12 February 2007.
- House of Lords Hansard, Monday 26 February 2007: Tributes: Earl Jellicoe.
- Obituaries

- The Independent (Dennis Kavanagh), Saturday 24 February 2007.
- The Times, The Daily Telegraph, & The Guardian (Andrew Roth): Monday 26 February 2007.
- Financial Times, (Sue Cameron): Tuesday 27 February 2007.
- Yesterday in Parliament, (David Wilby), BBC Radio Four, Tuesday 27 February 2007.
- The Scotsman, (Alasdair Steven), Wednesday 28 February 2007.
- The Times, (Lives Remembered, by Christopher Roberts), 28 February 2007.
- The Wiltshire Gazette and Herald, Thursday 1 March 2007.
- The Week, (a digest of the above), 3 March 2007.
- The Spectator, (Patrick Leigh Fermor), 3 March 2007.
- BBC Radio Four, Last Word (John Wilson), Friday 2 March 2007, (tx: circa 15:20–15:28).
- The Herald, Glasgow, Monday 5 March 2007.
- The Anglo-Hellenic Review, no. 36, Autumn 2007.

- The Times, and The Daily Telegraph, 1 June 2007, approximate list of those who attended his memorial service at the Guards Chapel, Wellington Barracks, Birdcage Walk, St James's Park, Westminster, on 31 May 2007.

- The Oldie, James Hughes Onslow on Earl Jellicoe's memorial service, page 69, July 2007.

- The Anglo-Hellenic League's reception in remembrance of its former Chairman and Patron, Cholmondeley Room, House of Lords, 14 February 2008. Spoken tributes by Lord Moynihan, Tryphon Kedros, John Julius Norwich, Sir James Gowans, Dimitris Paraskevas, & the Hon. Nicholas Jellicoe. This event was reported in The Anglo-Hellenic Review, no. 37, Spring 2008, page 2.

Political offices
Preceded by The Earl Bathurst	Lord-in-waiting; 1961	Succeeded by The Lord Denham
Preceded by The Lord Carrington	First Lord of the Admiralty; 1963–1964	Succeeded by Queen Elizabeth II as Lord High Admiral
Preceded by The Lord Shackleton	Lord Privy Seal; Leader of the House of Lords; 1970–1973	Succeeded by The Lord Windlesham
Party political offices
Preceded by The Lord Carrington	Leader of the Conservative Party in the House of Lords; 1970–1973	Succeeded by The Lord Windlesham
Honorary titles
Preceded by The Lord Oranmore and Browne	Longest-serving member in the House of Lords; 1999–2007	Succeeded by The Lord Carrington
Peerage of the United Kingdom
Preceded by John Jellicoe	Earl Jellicoe; 1935–2007	Succeeded by Patrick Jellicoe
