= John Jellicoe, 1st Earl Jellicoe =

Royal Navy Admiral of the Fleet (1859–1935)

Admiral of the Fleet The Right Honourable The Earl Jellicoe GCB OM GCVO SGM DL
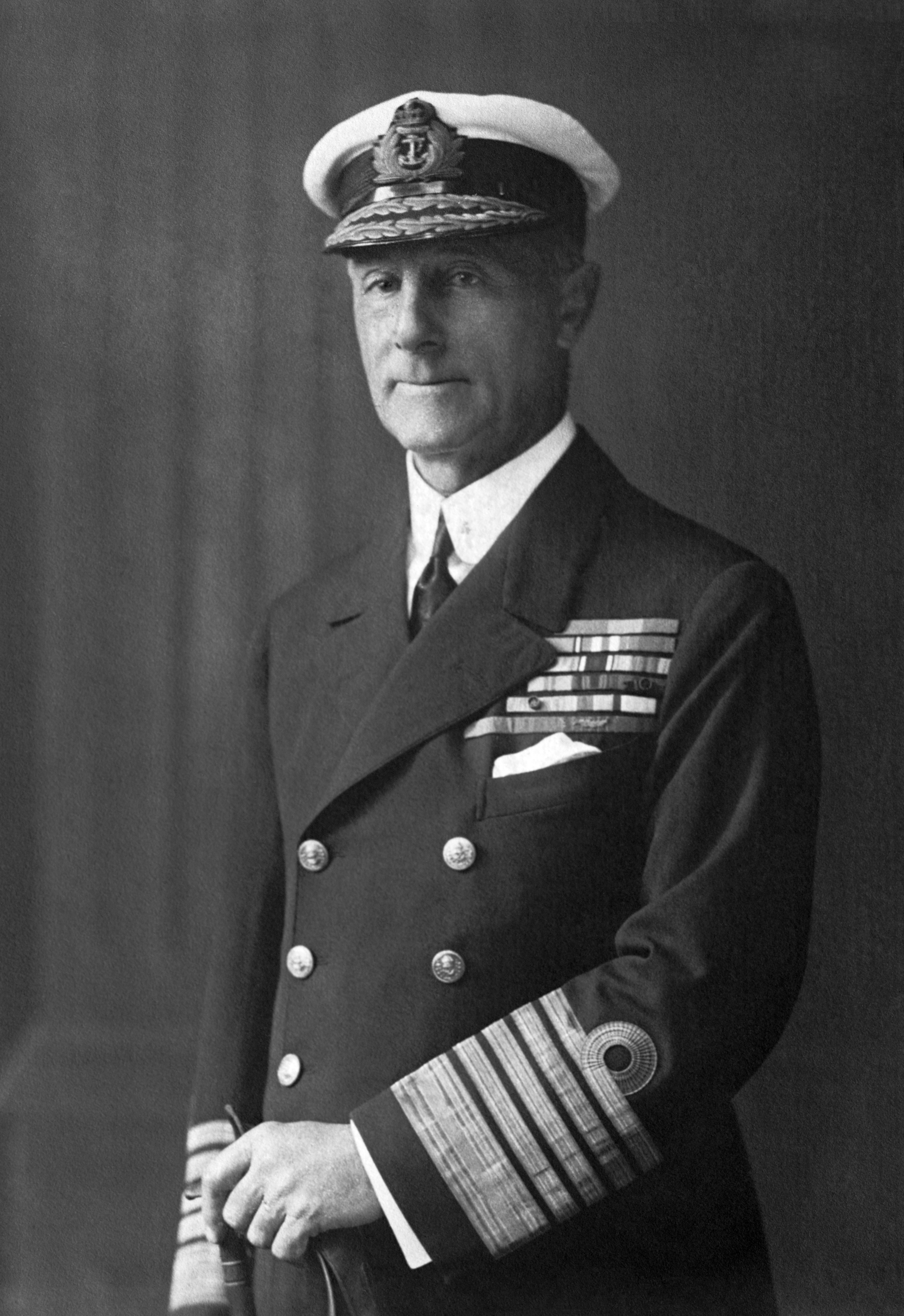

2nd Governor-General of New Zealand
- In office 27 September 1920 – 12 December 1924
- Monarch: George V
- Prime Minister: William Massey
- Preceded by: The Earl of Liverpool
- Succeeded by: Sir Charles Fergusson

First Sea Lord
- In office 30 November 1916 – 10 January 1918
- Prime Minister: David Lloyd George
- Preceded by: Sir Henry Jackson
- Succeeded by: Sir Rosslyn Wemyss

Member of the House of Lords
- Lord Temporal
- Hereditary peerage 7 March 1918 – 20 November 1935
- Succeeded by: The 2nd Earl Jellicoe

Personal details
- Born: 5 December 1859 Southampton, Hampshire, England
- Died: 20 November 1935 (aged 75) Kensington, London, England
- Spouse: Florence Cayzer (m. 1902)
- Children: 6

Military service
- Allegiance: United Kingdom
- Branch/service: Royal Navy
- Years of service: 1872–1919
- Rank: Admiral of the Fleet
- Commands: Grand Fleet; 2nd Battle Squadron; Atlantic Fleet; Third Sea Lord; Director of Naval Ordnance; HMS Drake; HMS Centurion
- Battles/wars: Anglo-Egyptian War; Boxer Rebellion; First World War: Blockade of Germany (1914–1919); Action of 16 December 1914; Action of 24 April 1916; Battle of Jutland; Action of 19 August 1916; Action of 18 October 1916; Atlantic U-boat campaign; Zeebrugge Raid
- Awards: Knight Grand Cross of the Order of the Bath; Member of the Order of Merit; Knight Grand Cross of the Royal Victorian Order; Sea Gallantry Medal

Admiral of the Fleet John Rushworth Jellicoe, 1st Earl Jellicoe (5 December 1859 – 20 November 1935) was a Royal Navy officer. He fought in the Anglo-Egyptian War and the Boxer Rebellion and commanded the Grand Fleet at the Battle of Jutland in May 1916 during the First World War. His handling of the fleet at that battle was controversial. Jellicoe made no serious mistakes and the German High Seas Fleet retreated to port, at a time when defeat would have been catastrophic for Britain, but the public was disappointed that the Royal Navy had not won a more dramatic victory given that they outnumbered the enemy. Jellicoe later served as First Sea Lord, overseeing the expansion of the Naval Staff at the Admiralty and the introduction of convoys, but was relieved at the end of 1917. He also served as the governor-general of New Zealand in the early 1920s.

== Early life ==
Jellicoe was born on 5 December 1859 in Southampton, Hampshire. Jellicoe was the son of John Henry Jellicoe, a captain in the Royal Mail Steam Packet Company, and Lucy Henrietta Jellicoe (née Keele). He was educated at Field House School in Rottingdean and aboard the training ship HMS Britannia, which he joined as a naval cadet in 1872. He was made a midshipman in the steam frigate HMS Newcastle in September 1874 before transferring to the ironclad HMS Agincourt in the Mediterranean Fleet in July 1877. Promoted to sub-lieutenant on 5 December 1878, he joined HMS Alexandra, flagship of the Mediterranean Fleet, as signal sub-lieutenant in 1880. Promoted to lieutenant on 23 September 1880, he returned to HMS Agincourt in February 1881 and commanded a rifle company of the Naval Brigade at Ismailia during the Egyptian war of 1882.

=== Early career ===
Jellicoe qualified as a gunnery officer in 1883 and was appointed to the staff of the gunnery school HMS Excellent in May 1884. He joined the turret ship HMS Monarch as gunnery officer in September 1885 and was awarded the Board of Trade Silver Medal for rescuing the crew of a capsized steamer near Gibraltar in May 1886. He joined the battleship HMS Colossus in April 1886 and was put in charge of the experimental department at HMS Excellent in December 1886 before being appointed an assistant to the Director of Naval Ordnance in September 1889.

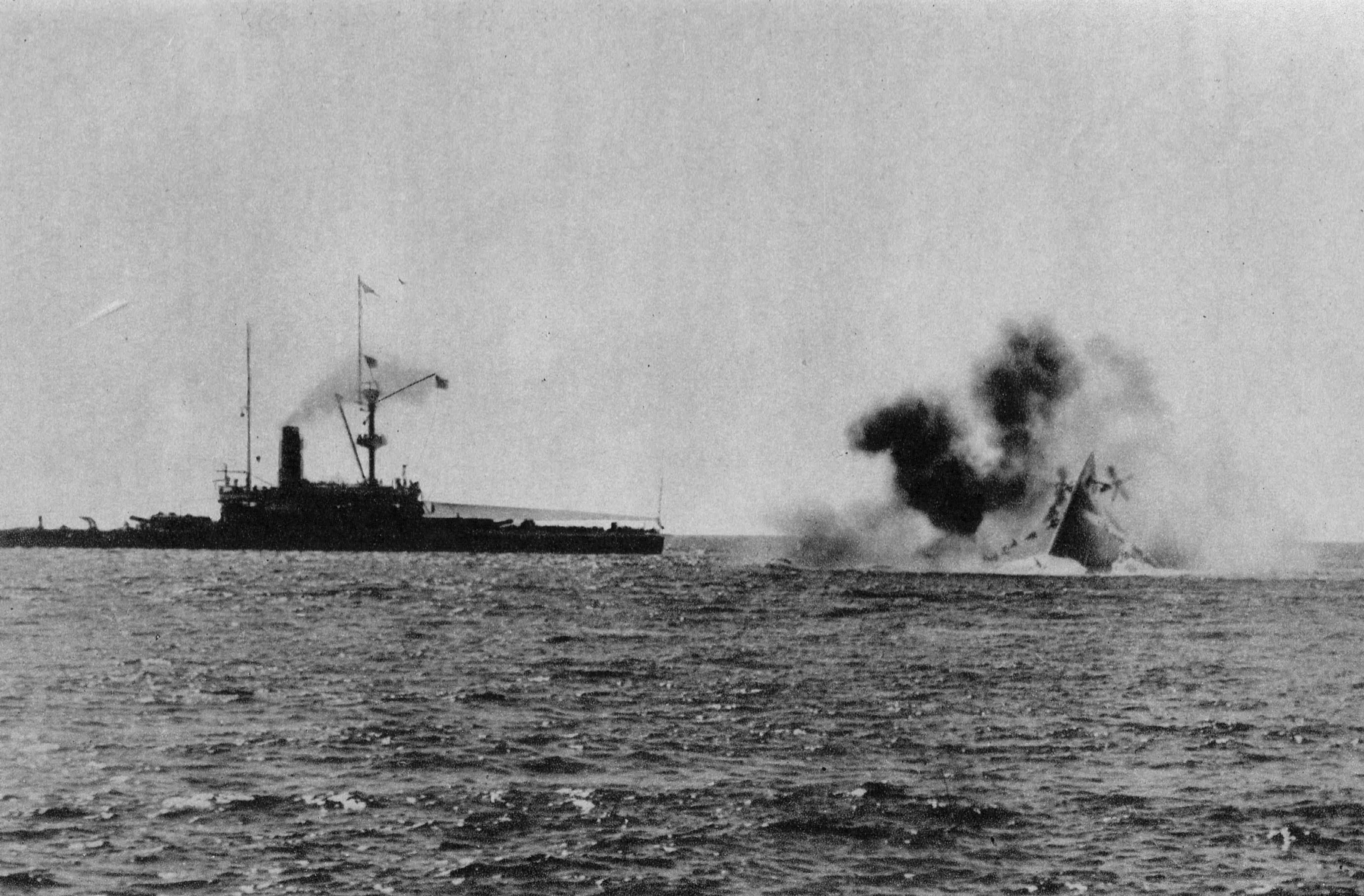
The battleship HMS Victoria sinking

Promoted to commander on 30 June 1891, Jellicoe joined the battleship HMS Sans Pareil in the Mediterranean Fleet in March 1892. He transferred to the battleship HMS Victoria in 1893 (the flagship of the Commander-in-Chief of the Mediterranean Fleet, Vice Admiral Sir George Tryon) and was aboard when it collided with HMS Camperdown and sank off Tripoli in Lebanon on 22 June 1893. He was then appointed to the new flagship, HMS Ramillies, in October 1893.

Promoted to captain on 1 January 1897, Jellicoe became a member of the Admiralty's Ordnance Committee. He served as captain of the battleship HMS Centurion and chief of staff to Vice Admiral Sir Edward Seymour during the Seymour Expedition to relieve the legations at Peking during the Boxer Rebellion in June 1900. He was badly wounded during the Battle of Beicang and told he would die but confounded the attending doctor and chaplain by living. He was appointed a Companion of the Order of the Bath and given the German Order of the Red Eagle, 2nd class, with Crossed Swords for services rendered in China. Centurion returned to the United Kingdom in August 1901, and was paid off the following month, when Captain Jellicoe and the crew went on leave. He became Naval Assistant to Third Naval Lord and Controller of the Navy in February 1902 and was given command of the armoured cruiser HMS Drake on the North America and West Indies Station in August 1903.

== Naval career ==
=== High command ===
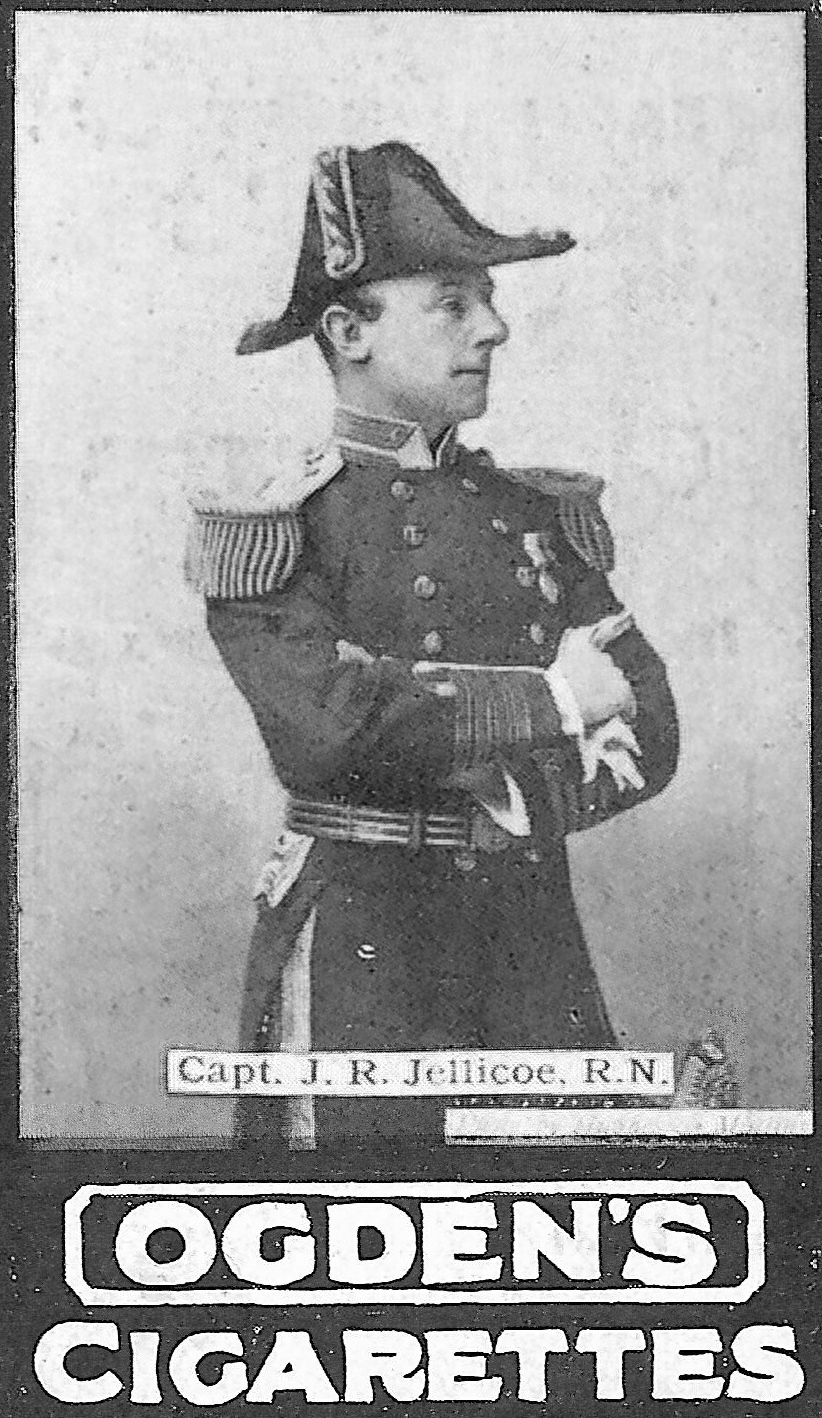
Jellicoe as captain, in command of HMS Centurion, flagship on the China Station (His depiction on a contemporary cigarette card shows he was in the public eye long before becoming an admiral.)

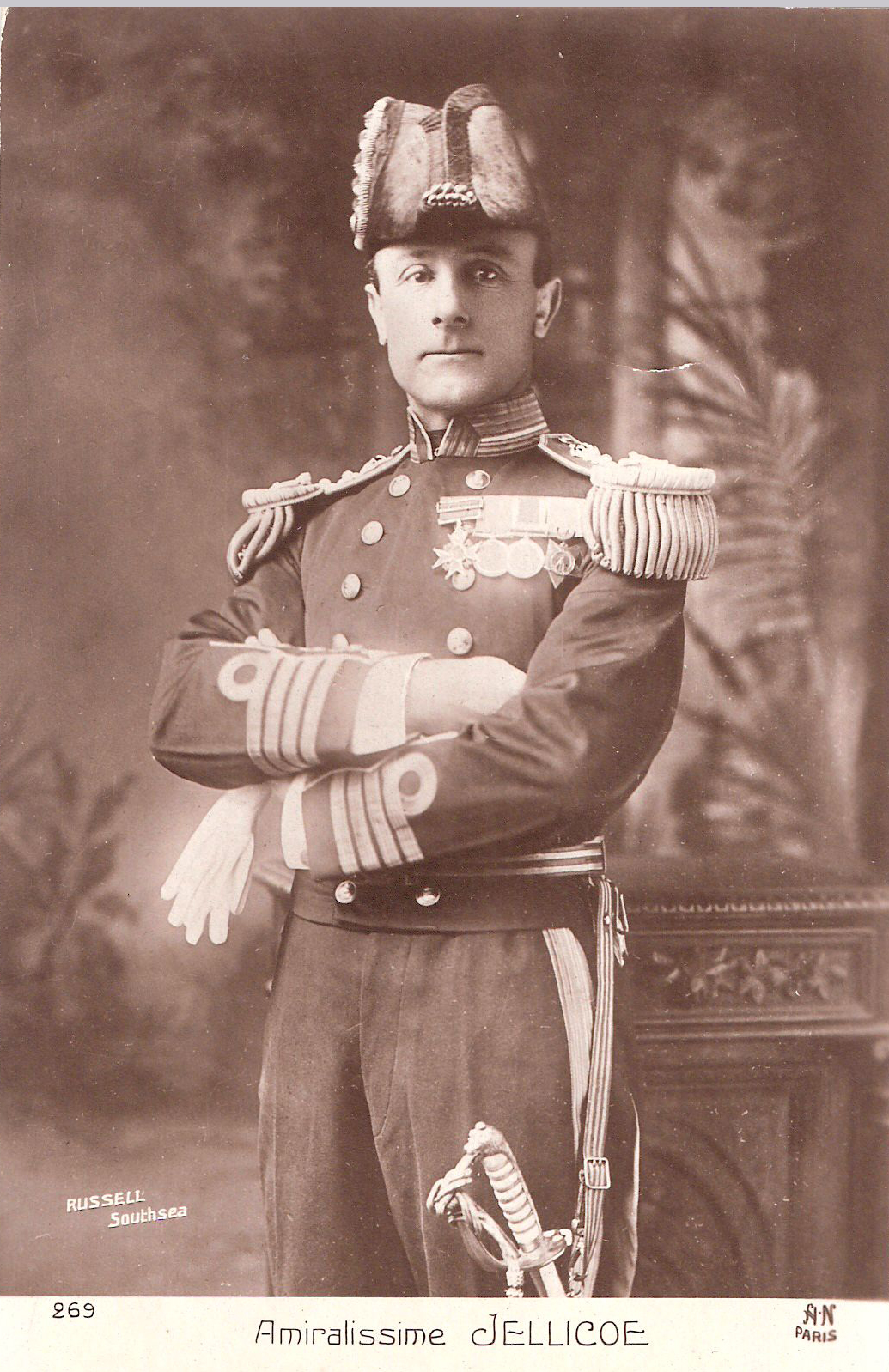
Admiral, or as the French knew him: Amiralissime Jellicoe, shown as a captain earlier in his career

As a protege of Admiral John Fisher, Jellicoe became Director of Naval Ordnance in 1905 and, having been appointed a Commander of the Royal Victorian Order on the occasion of launching of HMS Dreadnought on 10 February 1906, he was also made an Aide-de-Camp to the King on 8 March 1906. Promoted to rear admiral on 8 February 1907, he pushed hard for funds to modernise the navy, supporting the construction of new Dreadnought-type battleships and Invincible-class battlecruisers. He supported F. C. Dreyer's improvements in gunnery fire-control systems, and favoured the adoption of Dreyer's "Fire Control Table", a form of mechanical computer for calculating firing solutions for warships. Jellicoe arranged for the output of naval ordnance to be transferred from the War Office to the Admiralty.

Jellicoe was appointed second-in-command of the Atlantic Fleet in August 1907, hoisting his flag in the battleship HMS Albemarle. He was appointed Knight Commander of the Royal Victorian Order on the occasion of the King's Review of the Home Fleet in the Solent on 3 August 1907. He went on to be Third Sea Lord and Controller of the Navy in October 1908 and, having taken part in the funeral of King Edward VII in May 1910, he became Commander-in-Chief, Atlantic Fleet in December 1910, hoisting his flag in the battleship HMS Prince of Wales. He advanced to Knight Commander of the Order of the Bath on the Coronation of King George V on 19 June 1911 and confirmed in the rank of vice admiral on 18 September 1911. He went on to be Second-in-Command of the Home Fleet, hoisting his flag in the battleship HMS Hercules, in December 1911 and, having also been appointed commander of the 2nd Battle Squadron in May 1912, joined the Royal Commission on Fuel and Engines on 1 August 1912. He became Second Sea Lord in December 1912.

=== First World War ===
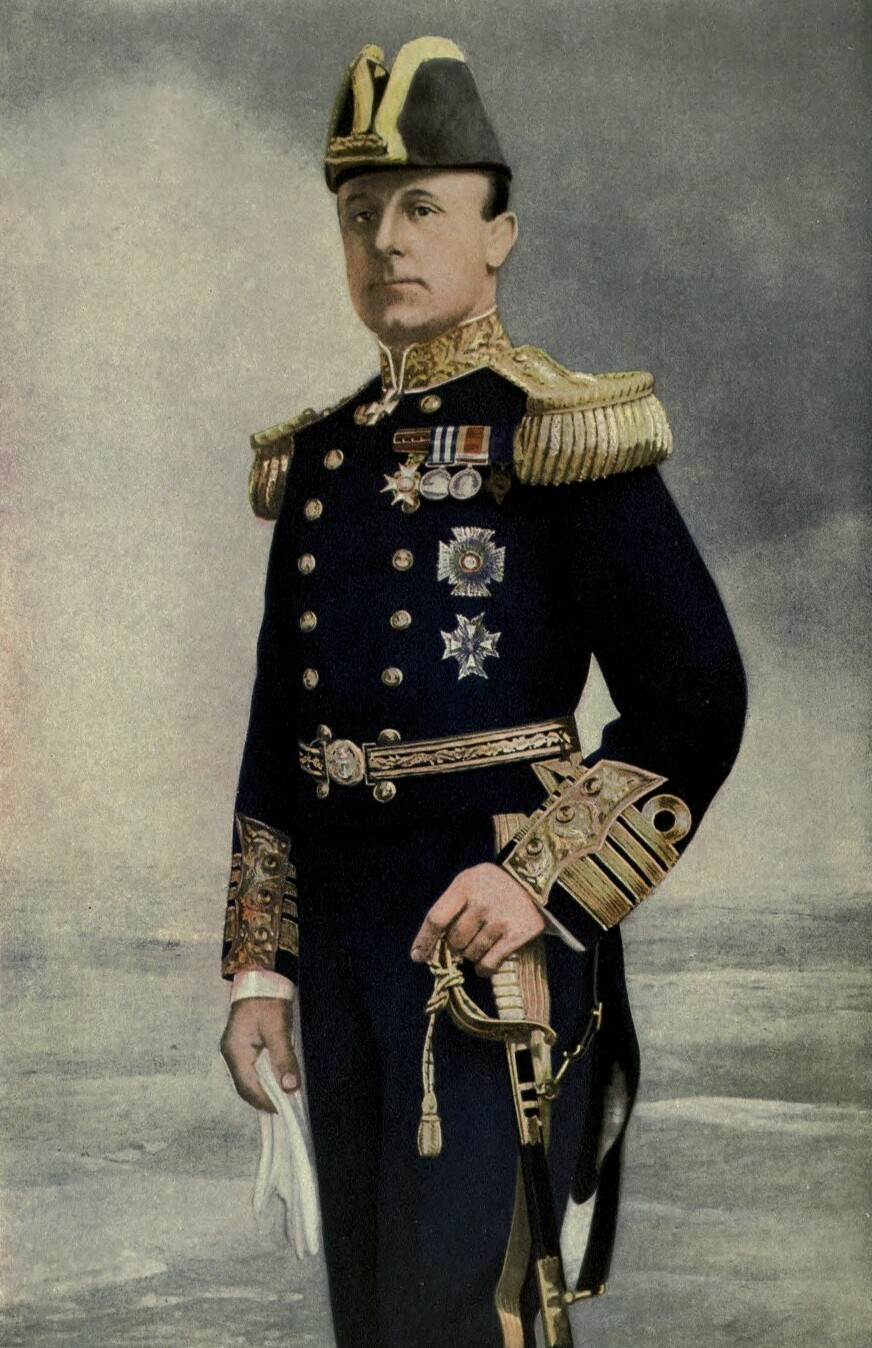
Admiral Jellicoe circa 1915

At the start of the First World War, the First Lord of the Admiralty Winston Churchill, removed Admiral George Callaghan, Commander-in-Chief of the Home Fleet (August 1914). Jellicoe was promoted to full admiral on 4 August 1914 and assigned command of the renamed Grand Fleet in Admiral Callaghan's place, though he was appalled by the treatment of his predecessor. He was promoted to Knight Grand Cross of the Order of the Bath on 8 February 1915.

When Fisher (First Sea Lord) and Churchill (First Lord of the Admiralty) both had to leave office (May 1915) after their quarrel over the Dardanelles, Jellicoe wrote to Fisher: "We owe you a debt of gratitude for having saved the Navy from a continuance in office of Mr Churchill, and I hope that never again will any politician be allowed to usurp the functions that he took upon himself to exercise".

Jellicoe commanded the British Grand Fleet at the Battle of Jutland in May 1916, the largest (and only major) clash of dreadnoughts, albeit an indecisive one. His handling of the Grand Fleet during the battle remains controversial, with some historians characterising Jellicoe as too cautious and other historians faulting the battlecruiser commander, Admiral David Beatty, for making various tactical errors. Jellicoe certainly made no significant mistakes during the battle: based on limited intelligence, he correctly deployed the Grand Fleet with a turn to port so as to "cross the T" of the German High Seas Fleet as it appeared. After suffering heavy damage from shells, the German fleet turned 180 degrees and headed away from the battle. At the time the British public expressed disappointment that the Royal Navy had not won a victory on the scale of the 1805 Battle of Trafalgar. Churchill described Jellicoe later as "the only man on either side who could lose the war in an afternoon" –essentially hinting that Jellicoe's decision to prefer caution was strategically correct. He was appointed a member of the Order of Merit on 31 May 1916, advanced to Knight Grand Cross of the Royal Victorian Order on 17 June 1916 and awarded the Grand Cross of the French Legion of Honour on 15 September 1916.

=== First Sea Lord ===
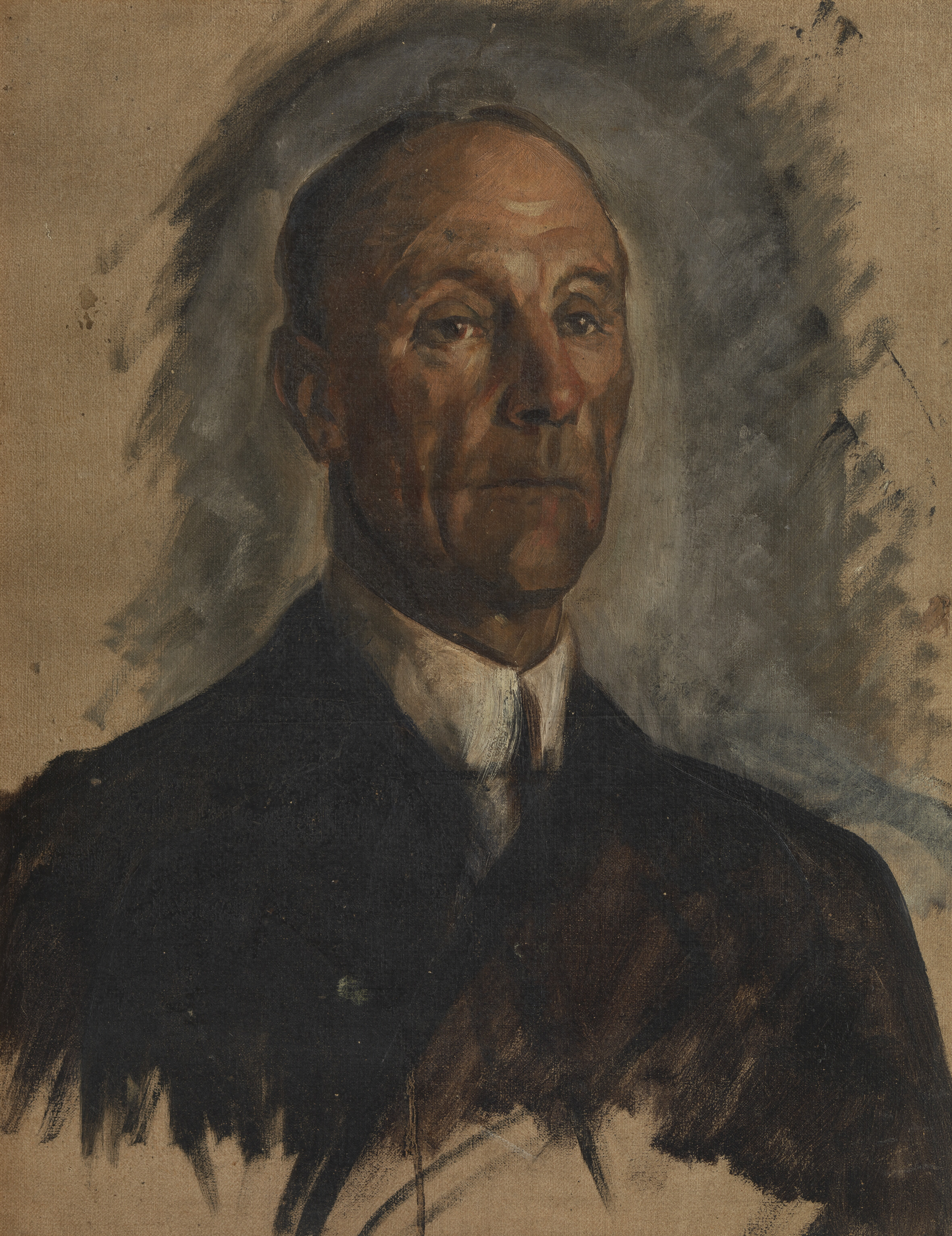
John Jellicoe, 1st Earl Jellicoe, 1918, by Glyn Philpot

Jellicoe was appointed First Sea Lord in November 1916. His term of office saw Britain brought within danger of starvation by German unrestricted U-Boat warfare.

At the War Committee (a Cabinet Committee which discussed strategy in 1915–16) in November 1916, the admirals present, including Jellicoe, told Lloyd George that convoys presented too large a target for enemy ships, and that merchant ship masters lacked the discipline to "keep station" in a convoy. In February 1917, Maurice Hankey wrote a memorandum for Lloyd George calling for the introduction of "scientifically organised convoys", almost certainly after being persuaded by Commander Henderson and the Shipping Ministry officials with whom he was in contact. After a breakfast meeting (13 February 1917) with Lloyd George, Carson (First Lord of the Admiralty) and Admirals Jellicoe and Duff agreed to "conduct experiments". However, convoys were not in general use until August 1917, by which time shipping losses to U-boats were already falling from their April peak.

Jellicoe continued to take a pessimistic view, advising the War Policy Committee (a Cabinet Committee which discussed strategy in 1917) during planning meetings for the Third Ypres Offensive in June and July that nothing could be done to defeat the U-boats. However, removing Jellicoe in July, as Lloyd George wanted, would have been politically impossible given Conservative anger at the return of Churchill (still blamed for the Dardanelles) to office as Minister of Munitions. In August and September Lloyd George was preoccupied with Third Ypres and the possible transfer of resources to Italy, whilst the new First Lord of the Admiralty, Sir Eric Campbell Geddes, was reforming the Naval Staff (including creating a post for Wemyss as Deputy First Sea Lord). Geddes and Lloyd George met with Balfour and Carson (both former First Lords of the Admiralty) on 26 October to discuss sacking Jellicoe after he had failed to act on "secret, but absolutely reliable" information about a German attack on a Norwegian convoy, but again nothing came of this as Lloyd George was soon preoccupied by the Battle of Caporetto and the setting up of the Supreme War Council. Geddes wanted to return to his previous job in charge of military transportation in France, and by December it was clear that Lloyd George would have to sack Jellicoe or lose Geddes.

Jellicoe was rather abruptly dismissed by Geddes in December 1917. Before he left for leave on Christmas Eve he received a letter from Geddes demanding his resignation. Geddes' letter stated that he was still in the building and available to talk, but after consulting Admiral Halsey Jellicoe replied in writing that he would "do what was best for the service". The move became public knowledge two days later.

The Christmas holiday, when Parliament was not sitting, provided a good opportunity to remove Jellicoe with a minimum of fuss. Geddes squared matters with the King and with the Grand Fleet commander Admiral Beatty (who had initially written to Jellicoe of his "dismay" over his sacking and promised to speak to Geddes, but then did not write to him again for a month) over the holiday. The other Sea Lords talked of resigning (although Jellicoe advised them not to do so), especially when Geddes suggested in a meeting (31 December) that Balfour and Carson had specifically recommended Jellicoe's removal at the 26 October meeting; they had not done so, although Balfour's denial was less than emphatic. There was no trouble from the generals, who had a low opinion of Jellicoe. In the end the Sea Lords remained in place, whilst Carson remained a member of the War Cabinet, resigning in January over Irish Home Rule.

Although it was pretended that the decision had been Geddes' alone, he let slip in the Naval Estimates debate (6 March 1918) that he had been conveying "the decision of the Government", i.e. of Lloyd George, who had never put the matter to the War Cabinet. MPs picked up on his slip immediately, and Bonar Law (Conservative Leader) admitted in the same debate that he too had had prior knowledge.

As First Sea Lord Jellicoe was awarded the Grand Cordon of the Belgian Order of Leopold on 21 April 1917, the Russian Order of St. George, 3rd Class on 5 June 1917, the Grand Cross of the Italian Military Order of Savoy on 11 August 1917 and the Grand Cordon of the Japanese Order of the Rising Sun on 29 August 1917.

== Later life ==
=== After war ===
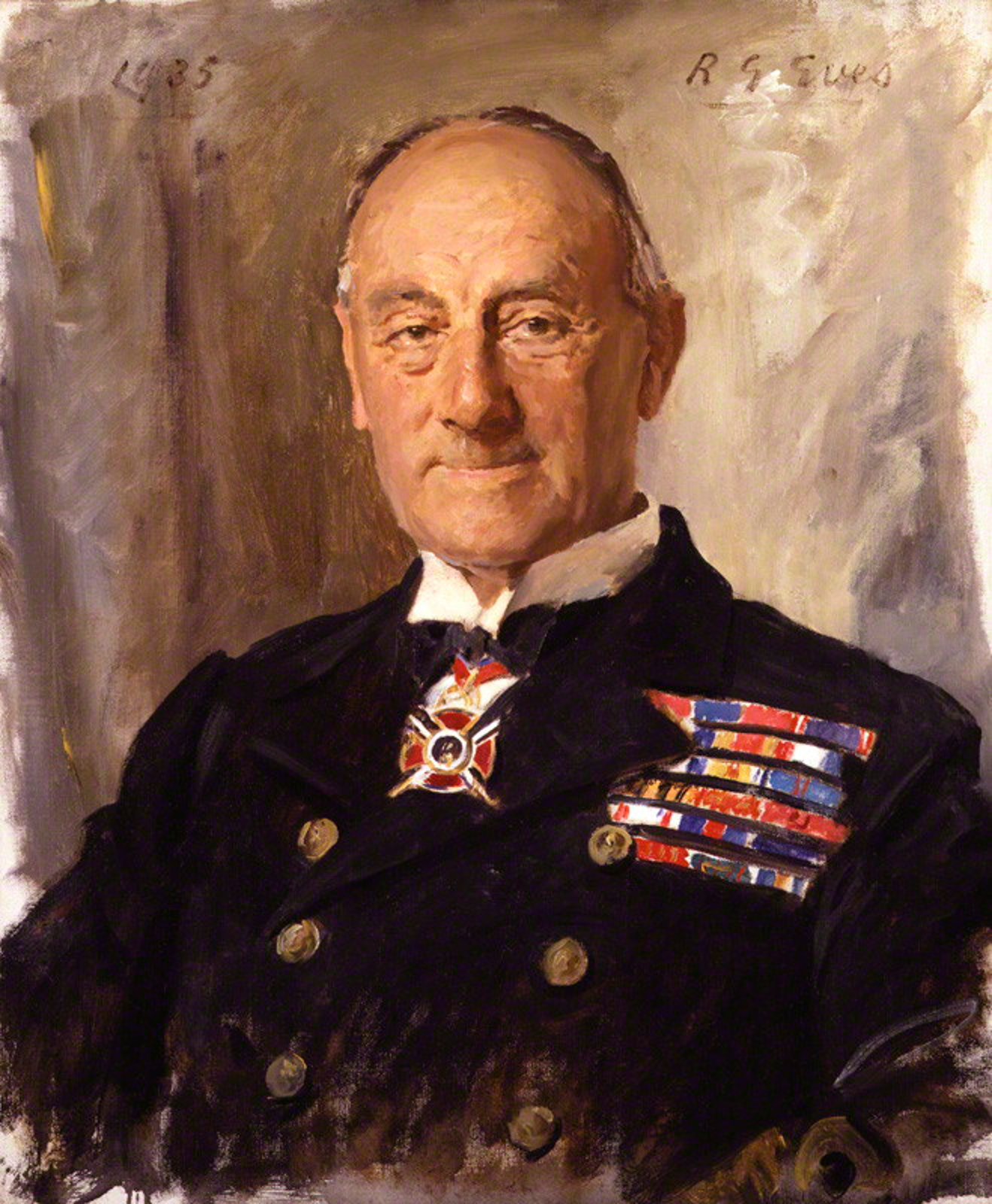
A 1935 portrait of Jellicoe by Reginald Grenville Eves

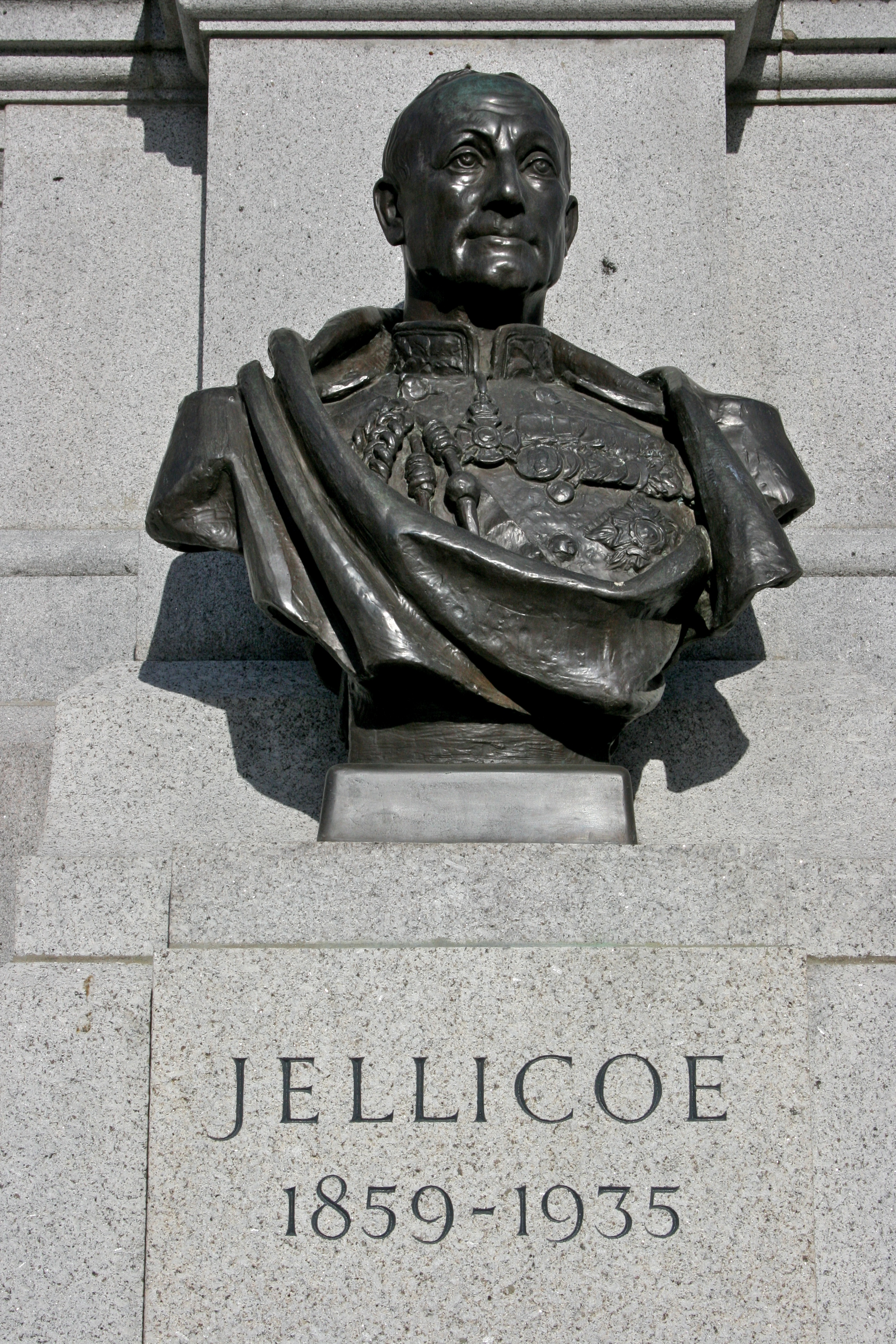
Bust in Trafalgar Square

Jellicoe was created Viscount Jellicoe of Scapa Flow on 7 March 1918.

At the Supreme War Council at the start of June 1918, amidst concerns that—following the Treaty of Brest-Litovsk—the Germans were about to requisition the Russian Black Sea Fleet, Lloyd George proposed Jellicoe as Allied Supreme Naval Commander in the Mediterranean. The French were in favour of a combined Allied naval command, but the Italians were not, so nothing came of the suggestion.

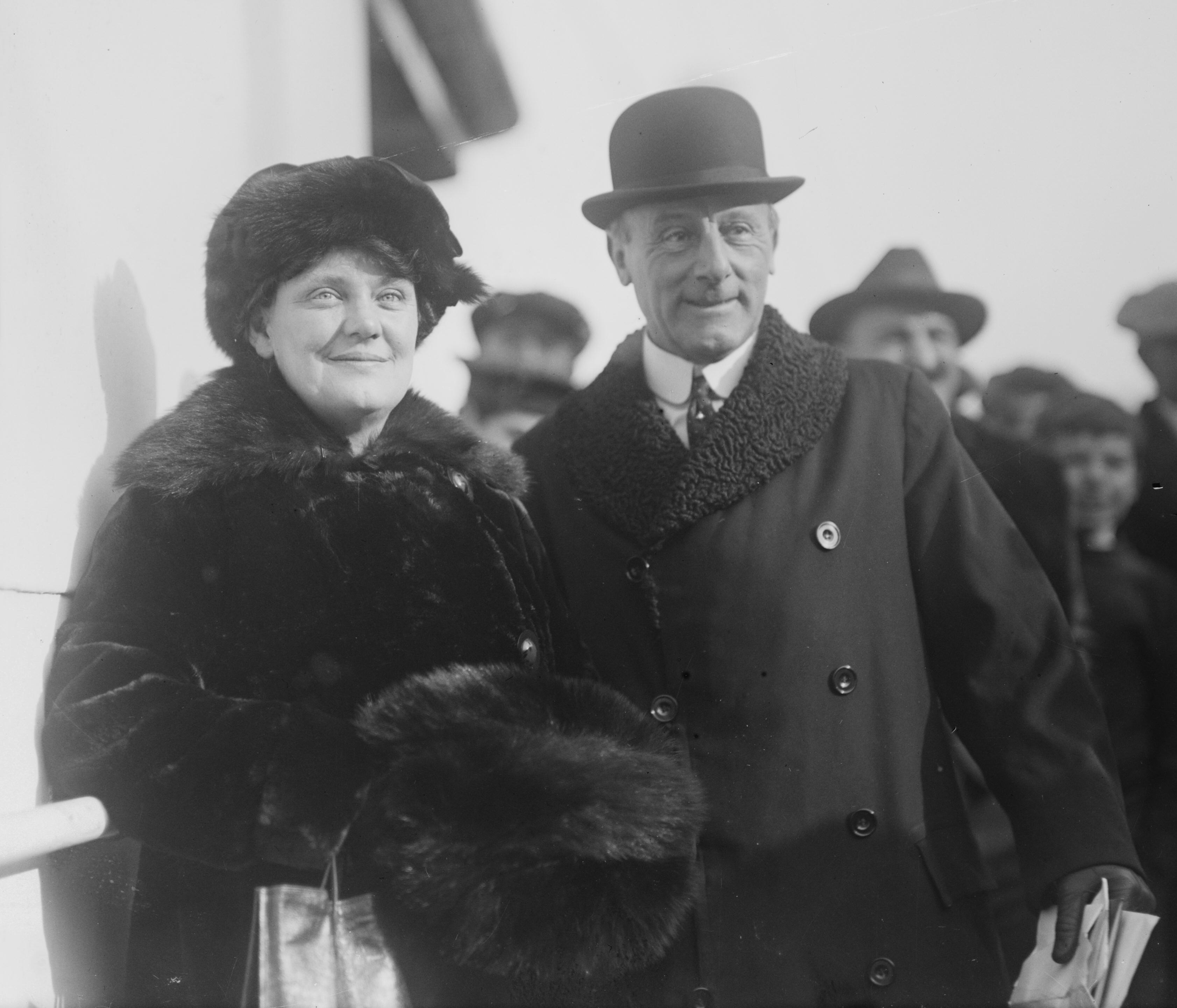
Lord and Lady Jellicoe, 1924

Jellicoe was promoted to Admiral of the Fleet on 3 April 1919. He became Governor-General of New Zealand in September 1920 and while there also served as Grand Master of New Zealand's Masonic Grand Lodge. Following his return to England, he was created Earl Jellicoe and Viscount Brocas of Southampton in the County of Southampton on 1 July 1925. He also served as the Commissioner for London Boy Scouts from 1925 to 1928 and as Chairman of the National Rifle Association. He was made a Deputy Lieutenant of Hampshire in 1932. He died of pneumonia at his home in Kensington in London on 20 November 1935 and was buried in St Paul's Cathedral.

== Legacy ==
In 1919, "Sleep, beneath the wave! a requiem" with words by Rev. Alfred Hall and Music by Albert Ham was "Dedicated to Admiral Viscount Jellicoe."

The attempt of his official biographer, Admiral Reginald Bacon, to portray him as the conqueror of the U-boats is, in John Grigg's view, absurd, as the main decisions were allegedly taken by other men. Bacon also claimed that his elevation to a viscountcy on dismissal was a deliberate snub, but in fact Sir John French, the former Commander-in-Chief of the BEF, was only a viscount at the time (both he and Jellicoe became Earls subsequently), while Fisher was never more than a Baron. Bacon's neutrality may be questionable as he had himself been sacked by Geddes from command of the Dover Patrol, replaced by Roger Keyes, shortly after Jellicoe's removal.

== Family ==
Jellicoe married, at Holy Trinity Church, Sloane Street, on 1 July 1902, Florence Gwendoline Cayzer, daughter of the shipping magnate Sir Charles Cayzer. His brother, Rev. Frederick Jellicoe (1858–1927), conducted the service. Lord and Lady Jellicoe had a son and five daughters. His son George Jellicoe, 2nd Earl Jellicoe, had a military career during the Second World War, after which he was a parliamentarian and a businessman.

== Honours ==
Ribbon bar (incomplete)

=== Peerages ===
- Viscount Jellicoe, of Scapa in the County of Orkney – 7 March 1918
- Earl Jellicoe and Viscount Brocas, of Southampton in the County of Southampton – 1 July 1925

=== British orders ===
- Knight Grand Cross of the Order of the Bath (GCB) – 8 February 1915 (KCB: 19 June 1911; CB: 9 November 1900)
- Order of Merit (OM) – 31 May 1916
- Knight Grand Cross of the Royal Victorian Order (GCVO) – 17 June 1916 (KCVO: 3 August 1907; CVO: 13 February 1906)

=== British decoration ===
- Sea Gallantry Medal (SGM) – 1886

=== British medals ===
- Egypt Medal
- China War Medal (1900)
- 1914-15 Star
- British War Medal
- World War I Victory Medal
- King George V Coronation Medal
- King George V Silver Jubilee Medal

=== International orders ===
- Kingdom of Prussia : Order of the Red Eagle, 2nd class with crossed swords – April 1902
- France : Grand Cross of the Legion of Honour – 15 September 1916
- Belgium : Grand Cordon of the Order of Leopold – 21 April 1917
- Russian Empire : Order of St. George, 3rd Class – 5 June 1917
- Kingdom of Italy : Grand Cross of the Military Order of Savoy – 11 August 1917
- Empire of Japan : Grand Cordon of the Order of the Paulownia Flowers – 29 August 1917

=== International decorations ===
- Navy Distinguished Service Medal of the United States – 16 September 1919
- Croix de Guerre of France – 21 February 1919
- Belgian Croix de Guerre – 21 April 1917
- Khedive's Star of Egypt – 1882

== Arms ==
Coat of arms of John Rushworth Jellicoe, 1st Earl Jellicoe
Notes The arms of John Jellicoe, Viscount Jellicoe consist of: (carved depiction) Crest Out of a Naval Crown Or, a Demi-Wolf Azure. Escutcheon Argent, three Bars wavy Azure, over all a Whale hauriant Sable. Supporters On either side a Sea-Griffin Or. Motto Sui memores merendo (Remembered for their merits)

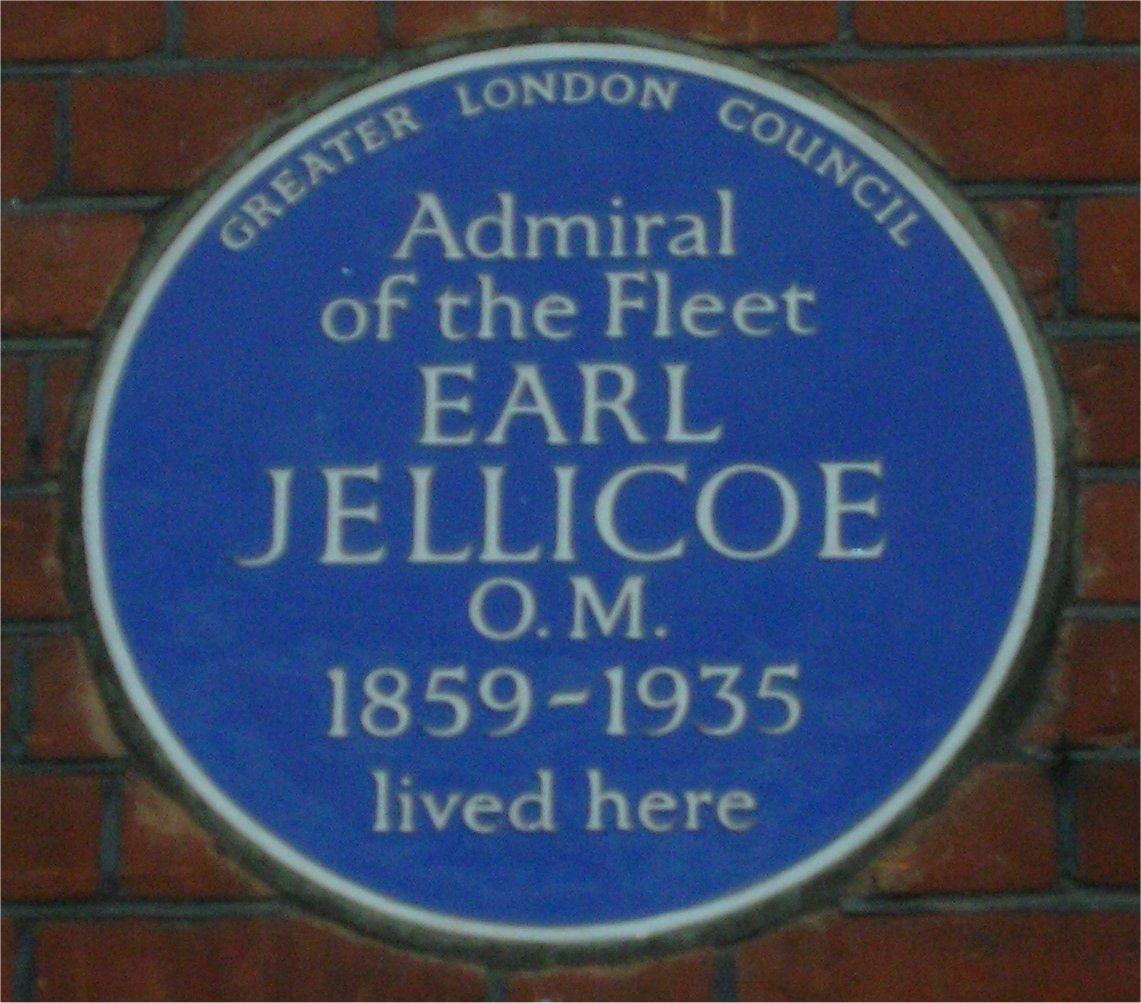
Blue plaque at 25 Draycott Place (Blacklands Terrace), Cadogan Gardens, London, SW3

== Sources ==
- Bacon, Admiral Sir Reginald (1936). The Life of John Rushworth, Earl Jellicoe, G.C.B., O.M., G.C.V.O, L.L.D., D.C.L. Cassell. ASIN B00085MS20. OCLC 1369430.
- Brooks, John (2005). Dreadnought Gunnery and the Battle of Jutland: The Question of Fire Control. Routledge. ISBN 0714657026. OCLC 56066419.
- Grigg, John (2002). Lloyd George: War Leader, 1916–1918. Allen Lane. ISBN 978-0571277490. OCLC 51070039.
- Heathcote, Tony (2002). The British Admirals of the Fleet 1734 – 1995. Barnsley, UK: Leo Cooper. ISBN 0-85052-835-6. OCLC 50175925.
- Massie, Robert Kinloch (2003). Castles of Steel: Britain Germany, and the Winning of the Great War at Sea. New York: Ballantine Books. ISBN 0-345-40878-0. OCLC 51553670.

Military offices
Preceded by George Egerton	Rear Admiral Second-in-Command, Atlantic Fleet; 1907–1908	Succeeded by William B. Fisher
Preceded by Sir Henry Jackson	Third Sea Lord and Controller of the Navy; 1908–1910	Succeeded by Sir Charles Briggs
Preceded by Prince Louis of Battenberg	Vice-Admiral Commanding, Atlantic Fleet; 1910–1911	Succeeded by Sir Cecil Burney
Preceded by Prince Louis of Battenberg	Second Sea Lord; 1912–1914	Succeeded by Sir Frederick Hamilton
New command	Commander-in-Chief, Grand Fleet; 1914–1916	Succeeded by Sir David Beatty
Preceded by Sir Henry Jackson	First Sea Lord; 1916–1917	Succeeded by Sir Rosslyn Wemyss
Government offices
Preceded by The Earl of Liverpool	Governor-General of New Zealand; 1920–1924	Succeeded by Sir Charles Fergusson, Bt
Peerage of the United Kingdom
New creation	Earl Jellicoe; 1925–1935	Succeeded by George Jellicoe
New creation	Viscount Jellicoe; 1918–1935	Succeeded by George Jellicoe
