= Earl Jellicoe =

Earldom in the Peerage of the United Kingdom

Earldom of Jellicoe
- Argent, three Bars wavy Azure, over all a Whale hauriant Sable. Crest: Out of a Naval Crown Or, a Demi-Wolf Azure. Supporters: On either side a Sea-Griffin Or.
- Creation date: 29 June 1925
- Created by: King George V
- Peerage: Peerage of the United Kingdom
- First holder: John Jellicoe, 1st Viscount Jellicoe
- Present holder: Patrick Jellicoe, 3rd Earl Jellicoe
- Heir presumptive: The Hon. Nicholas Charles Joseph Jellicoe
- Remainder to: The 1st Earl's heirs male of the body lawfully begotten
- Subsidiary titles: Viscount Jellicoe; Viscount Brocas
- Motto: SUI MEMORES MERENDO; Remembered for their merits

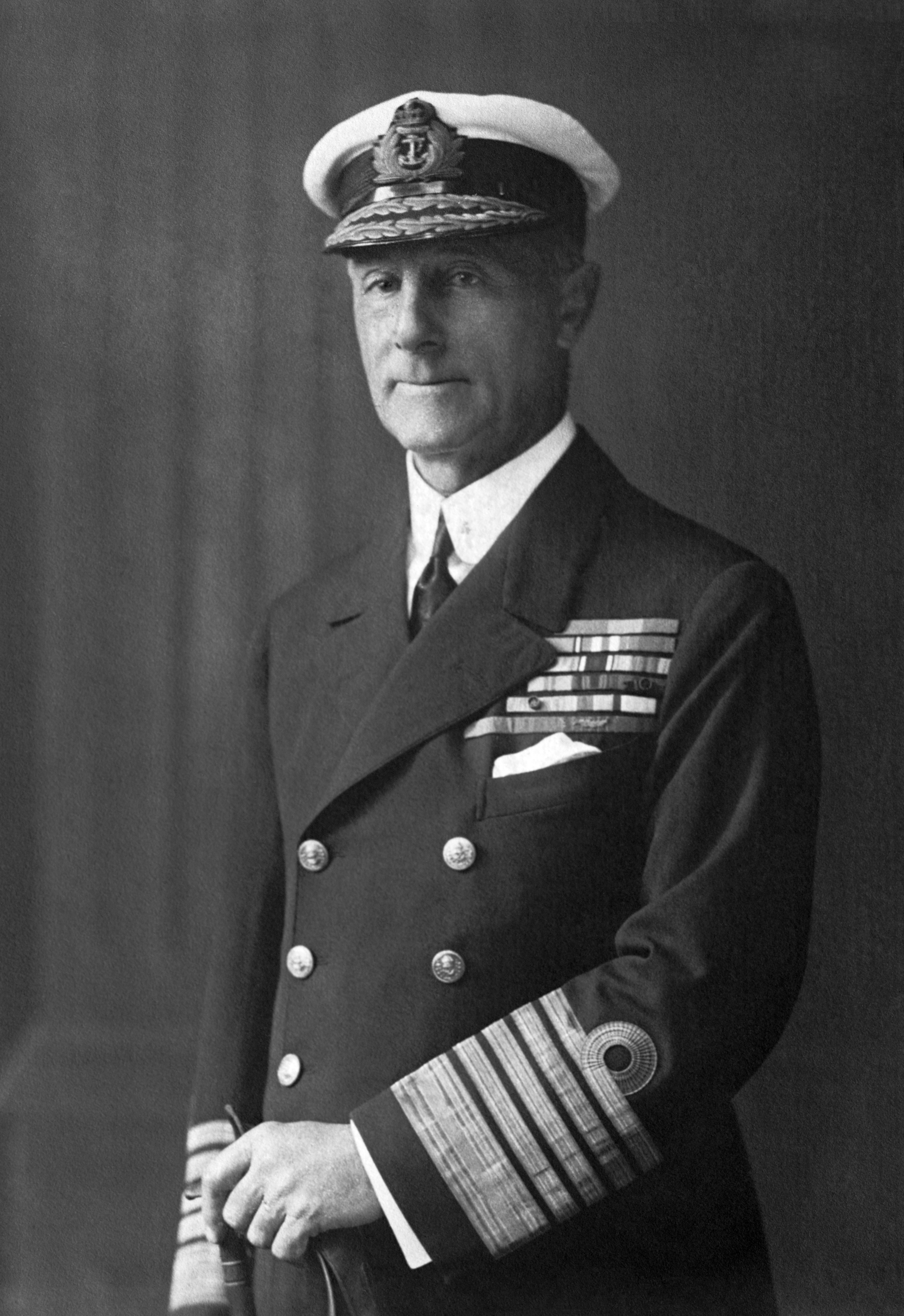
Admiral of the Fleet The 1st Earl Jellicoe

Earl Jellicoe is a title in the Peerage of the United Kingdom. It was created, along with the subsidiary title Viscount Brocas, of Southampton in the County of Southampton, on 29 June 1925 for Admiral of the Fleet John Jellicoe, 1st Viscount Jellicoe, on his return from being Governor-General of New Zealand, with remainder to the heirs male of his body. He had already been created Viscount Jellicoe, of Scapa in the County of Orkney, on 15 January 1918, created with remainder to the heirs male of his body, and in default of such issue to his eldest daughter and the heirs male of her body, with the like remainder in default of such issue to every other daughter successively in order of priority of birth, and to the heirs male of their bodies. The Jellicoe viscountcy was created with remainder to his daughters and their heirs male because, at the time of the creation, Jellicoe had five daughters and no sons. His only son was born three months later.

The title of Viscount Brocas is used as a courtesy title for the earl's eldest son and heir apparent. Brocas was chosen due to the descent of Admiral Jellicoe's great-grandmother, Jane Elizabeth, daughter of Sir James Whalley-Smythe-Gardiner, 2nd Baronet, of Roche Court, Fareham, from the last of the Brocases of Beaurepaire (purchased 1353, sold 1873), Sherborne St John, Hampshire. This was a family with Gascon roots that produced two masters of the horse and a 300-year (14th to 17th century) line of hereditary masters of the king's buckhounds.

The 1st Earl Jellicoe was succeeded by his only son, George. The second earl served in the Coldstream Guards, No. 8 Commando, the Special Air Service and commanded the Special Boat Service during the Second World War. He later became a diplomat and a Conservative politician and served as the last First Lord of the Admiralty from 1963 to 1964 and as Lord Privy Seal and Leader of the House of Lords from 1970 to 1973. In 1999 he was given a life peerage as Baron Jellicoe of Southampton, of Southampton, in the County of Hampshire, and remained a member of the House of Lords despite the passing of the House of Lords Act 1999 which removed the hereditary peerage's automatic right to sit in the Lords. Until his death in 2007, the second Earl Jellicoe was the longest-serving member of the Lords, and technically the longest-serving parliamentarian in the world, having taken his seat in 1939.

== Arms ==
- Shield: Argent three bars wavy azure, over all a whale hauriant sable.
- Crest: Out of a naval crown or a demi-wolf azure.
- Supporters: On either side a sea griffin or [gold].
- Motto: Sui memores alios fecere merendo: Remembered for their merits: Virgil's Aeneid, VI, 664].

== Earl Jellicoe (1925) ==
- John Rushworth Jellicoe, 1st Earl Jellicoe (1859–1935).
- George Patrick John Rushworth Jellicoe, 2nd Earl Jellicoe (1918–2007).
- Patrick John Bernard Jellicoe, 3rd Earl Jellicoe (b. 1950).

== Present peer ==
Patrick John Bernard Jellicoe, 3rd Earl Jellicoe (born 29 April 1950), is the eldest son of the 2nd Earl and his wife Patricia Christine O'Kane. Formally styled as Viscount Brocas from birth, he was educated at Eton College. In 2003 he was living in Tiverton, Devon.

On 22 February 2007, he succeeded his father as Earl Jellicoe (U.K., 1925), Viscount Brocas (U.K., 1925) and Viscount Jellicoe, of Scapa, Orkney (U.K., 1918).

In 1971, as Lord Brocas, he married Geraldine Ann FitzGerald Jackson; they were divorced in 1981, having one son, Justin Amadeus Jellicoe (born 1970).

Jellicoe also has a son with Clare Fisher, Jack Jellicoe (born 1977).

As both sons were born outside wedlock, the heir presumptive to the peerages is the present holder's brother, the Hon. Nicholas Charles Joseph Jellicoe (born 1953).

== Line of succession ==
1. Hon. Nicholas Charles Joseph John Jellicoe (b. 1953), second son of the 2nd earl
2. Hon. John Philip Jellicoe (b. 1966), third and youngest son of the 2nd earl

The above are in the line of succession for both the earldom and the viscountcies. There are further heirs to the viscountcy of Jellicoe (but not that of Brocas) in accordance with the special remainder granted in that title to the heirs male of the first viscount's daughters in order of birth.
