= Louise Sandher-Jones =

British politician

Louise Sandher-Jones MP
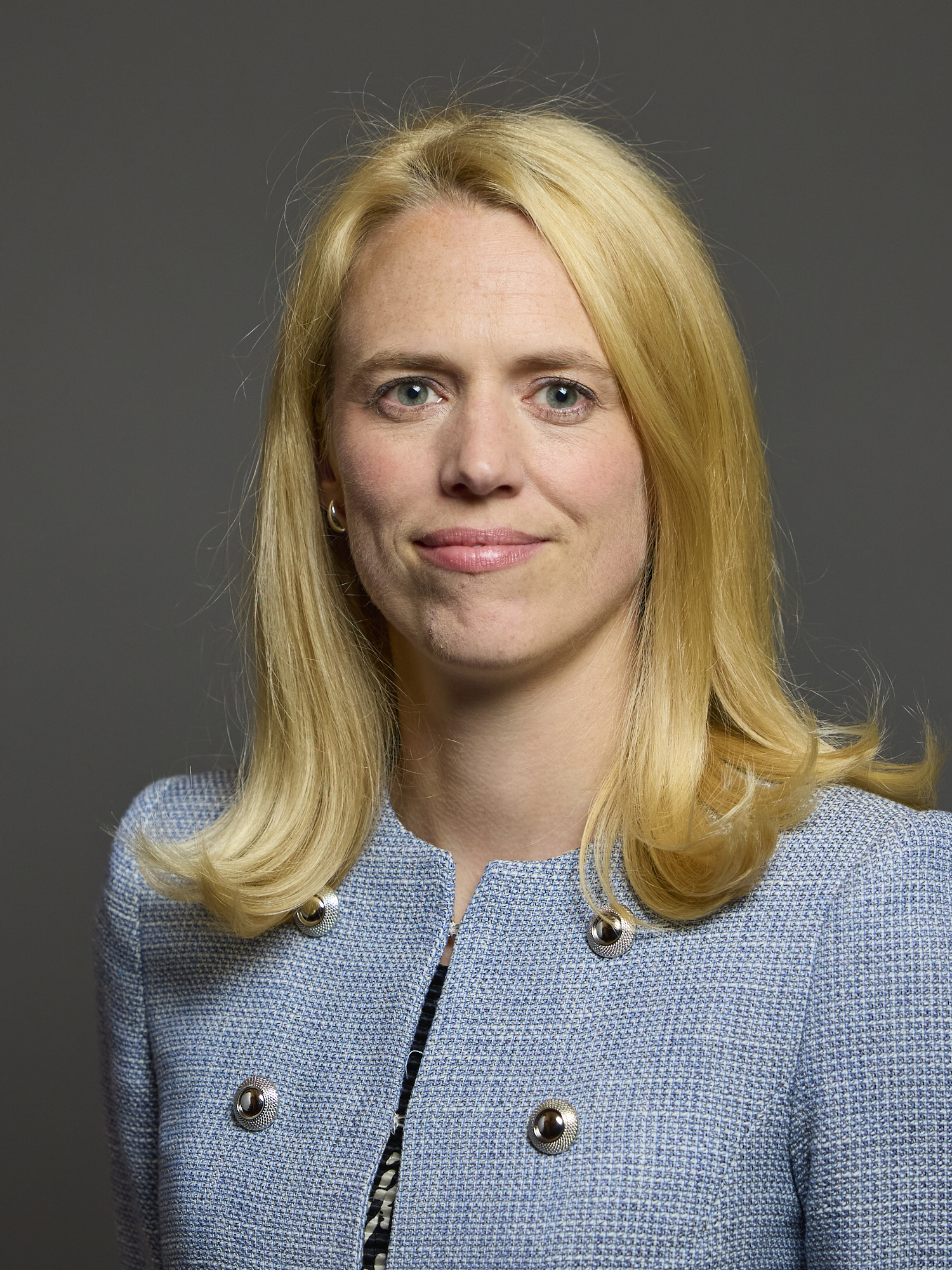
- Official portrait, 2024

Parliamentary Under-Secretary of State for the Armed Forces
- Incumbent
- Assumed office 12 June 2026
- Prime Minister: Keir Starmer; Andy Burnham
- Preceded by: Al Carns

Parliamentary Under-Secretary of State for Veterans and People
- In office 6 September 2025 – 12 June 2026
- Prime Minister: Keir Starmer
- Preceded by: Al Carns
- Succeeded by: Calvin Bailey

Member of Parliament for North East Derbyshire
- Incumbent
- Assumed office 4 July 2024
- Preceded by: Lee Rowley
- Majority: 1,753 (3.9%)

Personal details
- Born: Louise Elizabeth Jones; 1989 or 1990 (age 35–36)
- Party: Labour
- Spouse: Jeevun Sandher (m. 2025)
- Education: University of Edinburgh (MA); Royal Military Academy Sandhurst

Military service
- Allegiance: United Kingdom
- Branch/service: British Army
- Years of service: 2013–2020
- Rank: Captain
- Unit: Intelligence Corps
- Battles/wars: War in Afghanistan

Louise Elizabeth Sandher-Jones (née Jones; born 1989 or 1990) is a British politician and former British Army officer and Intelligence professional who has served as Parliamentary Under-Secretary of State for the Armed Forces since 2026. A member of the Labour Party, she has been the Member of Parliament for North East Derbyshire since 2024. She gained the seat from Lee Rowley, a Conservative.

== Early career and military service ==
Sandher-Jones was born in 1989 or 1990, and grew up in Leicestershire. She studied Chinese at the University of Edinburgh, during which she spent a year abroad at Ocean University of China. After graduating from university, she joined the Civil Service graduate scheme.

Sandher-Jones joined the British Army in 2013. Having attended the Royal Military Academy Sandhurst, she was commissioned as second lieutenant in the Intelligence Corps on 12 April 2014. She served in the War in Afghanistan. She was promoted to lieutenant on 12 April 2015, and to captain with seniority from 12 April 2017. She retired from the army on 14 March 2020.

After leaving the army, Jones was an associate at Morgan Stanley. In July 2021, she joined McKenzie Intelligence Services as Head of Intelligence. She worked as a senior manager at McKenzie, an "Insurtech analysing the impact of natural disasters".

She served as a councillor for the Loughborough East ward on Charnwood Borough Council, resigning from this role in March 2024 after she was selected as the prospective parliamentary candidate for North East Derbyshire.

== Parliamentary career ==
Sandher-Jones was elected to parliament in the 2024 United Kingdom general election as the member of parliament for North East Derbyshire, with a majority of 1,753 (3.9%). She made her maiden speech in the house of commons on 8 October 2024.

In September 2025 she was appointed as Parliamentary Under-Secretary of State for Veterans and People in the Ministry of Defence, by Keir Starmer. In June 2026, she was appointed Parliamentary Under-Secretary of State for the Armed Forces.

== Personal life ==
Sandher-Jones is married to Jeevun Sandher, the Labour MP for Loughborough. They met in January 2023 when they were both on the campaign trail, and announced their engagement shortly after his proposal on 1 December 2024. They married in August 2025, after which she changed her surname from Jones to Sandher-Jones.

Parliament of the United Kingdom
Preceded by Lee Rowley	Member of Parliament for North East Derbyshire; 2024–present	Incumbent
