= Navy Board (1964–present) =

Body responsible for the day-to-day running of His Majesty's Naval Service

Agency overview
- Formed: 1964
- Jurisdiction: United Kingdom
- Headquarters: Whitehall, London
- Agency executive: General Sir Gwyn Jenkins (First Sea Lord)
- Parent agency: Ministry of Defence

The Navy Board is the body responsible for the day-to-day running of His Majesty's Naval Service. Its composition is similar to that of the Admiralty Board of the Defence Council of the United Kingdom, except that it does not include any of His Majesty's Ministers. The Board shares a name with its historic predecessor, the Navy Board of 1546 to 1832, but is unrelated in structure or membership.

== Membership of the Board ==
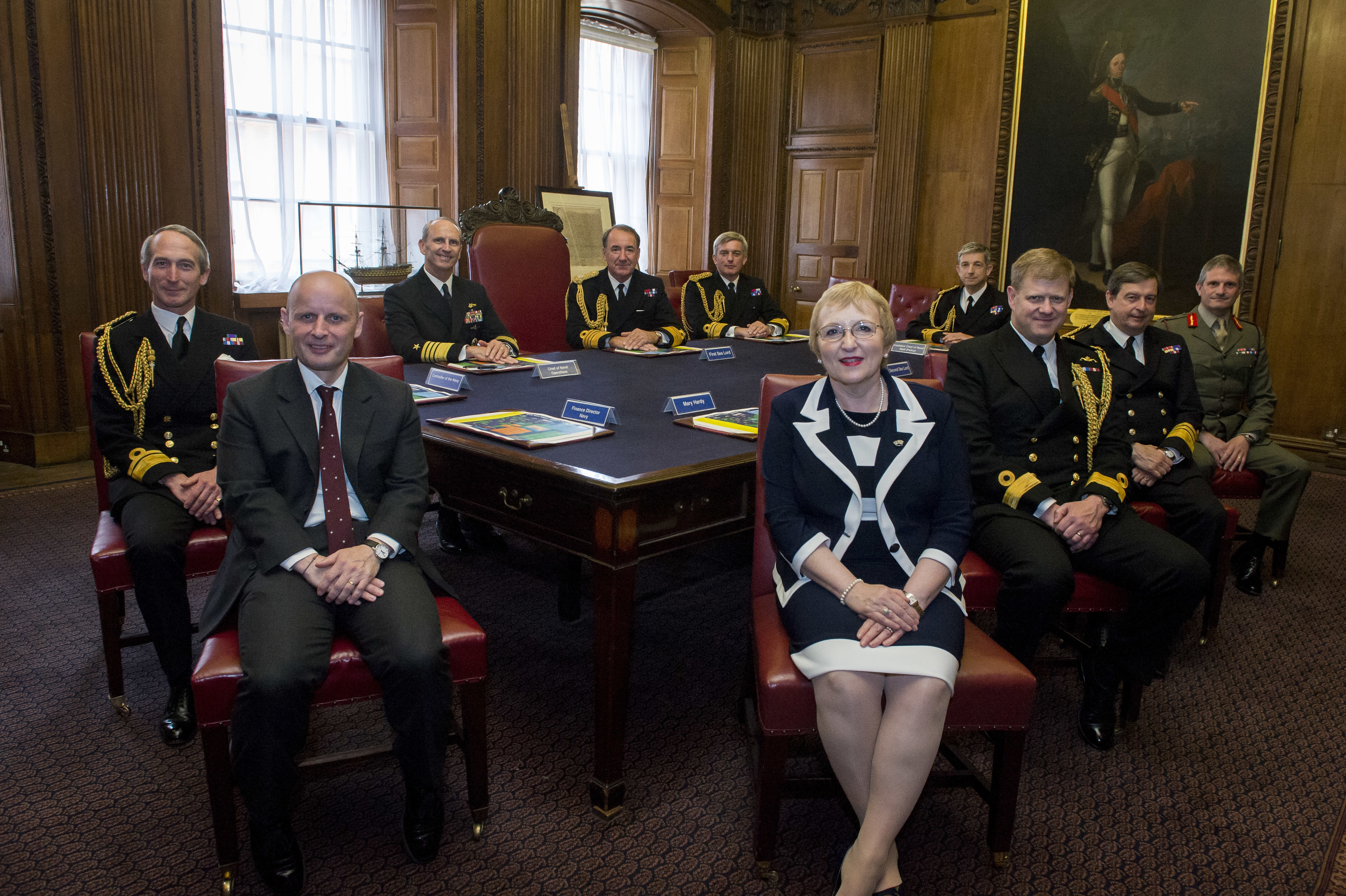
Meeting of the Navy Board in 2015 with Admiral Jonathan Greenert, American Chief of Naval Operations (3rd from left), as a visitor

The composition is as follows:

- Civilian
  - Chris Weston
  - Brian Gilvary
  - Lance Batchelor
  - Helen Miles
  - Auriol Stevens
  - Finance Director (Navy)
- Royal Navy
  - First Sea Lord and Chief of the Naval Staff
  - Second Sea Lord and Deputy Chief of the Naval Staff
  - Fleet Commander
  - Assistant Chief of the Naval Staff (Policy)
