= Parliamentary Under-Secretary of State for the Armed Forces =

British ministerial position

United Kingdom Parliamentary Under-Secretary of State for the Armed Forces
- Royal Arms as used by His Majesty's Government

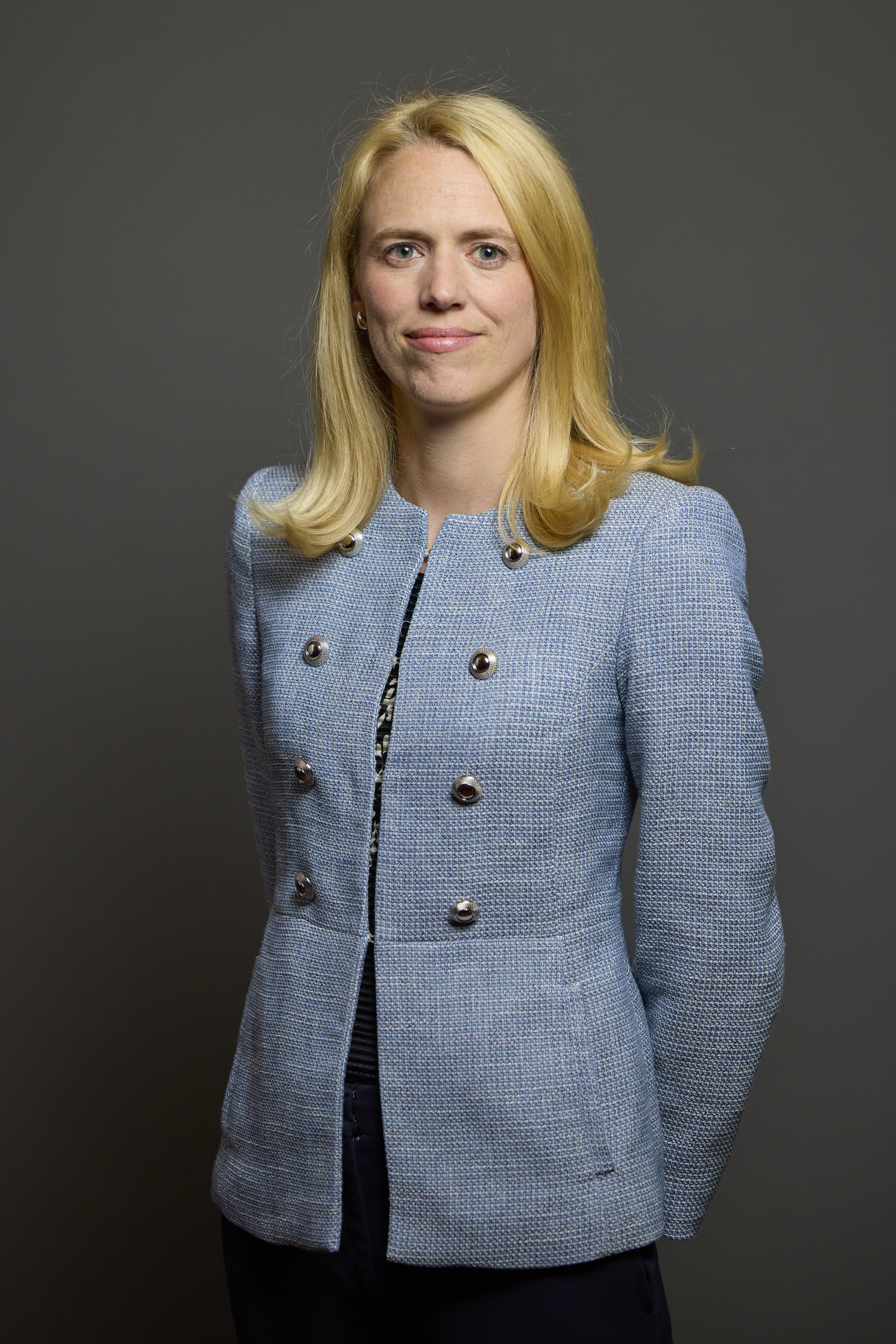
- Incumbent; Louise Sandher-Jones since 12 June 2026
- Ministry of Defence
- Member of: Defence Council; Admiralty Board; Army Board; Air Force Board
- Reports to: Secretary of State for Defence
- Nominator: Secretary of State for Defence
- Appointer: Prime Minister; Subject to formal approval by the King-in-Council
- Term length: No fixed term
- Inaugural holder: Peter Blaker
- Formation: 1981
- Website: www.gov.uk

The parliamentary under-secretary of state for the armed forces is a mid-level ministerial position at the Ministry of Defence in the Government of the United Kingdom.

The office sometimes acts as the deputy to the secretary of state for defence, when it is of Minister of State rank. In July 2024, the appointment of Luke Pollard reverted the minister’s title to Parliamentary Under-Secretary of State.

The corresponding shadow minister is the shadow minister for the armed forces.

== Roles ==
The responsibilities of the minister of state for the armed forces are:

- implementation of relevant SDR Vision and Recommendations
- oversight of Military Strategic Headquarters (MSHQ)
- legislation (including Armed Forces Bill)
- Northern Ireland Legacy
- Ukraine support – operations
- autonomy and drones, including Drone Centre of Excellence
- Force Posture and Deployment
- Intelligence
- Global Operational policy and commitments
- North Atlantic Treaty Organisation (NATO) operations and planning
- crisis response
- Permanent Joint Operational Bases and Overseas Bases (including Cyprus, Falkland Islands and Gibraltar)
- Military Aid to Civilian Authority (MACA)
- Homeland Defence
- UN Peacekeeping and Human Security Call Out Orders
- Overseas Security and Justice Assistance Reports

== List of ministers and under-secretaries ==
Colour key (for political parties):
Conservative Labour Liberal Democrats

Minister	Term of office		Political party	Ministry	Defence Sec.
=== Parliamentary Under-Secretary of State for the Army ===
Barney Hayhoe	6 May 1979	5 January 1981	Conservative	Thatcher I	Pym
Philip Goodhart	5 January 1981	19 May 1981	Conservative	Thatcher I	Pym
=== Minister of State for the Armed Forces ===
Peter Blaker	29 May 1981	13 June 1983	Conservative	Thatcher I	Nott
Peter Blaker	29 May 1981	13 June 1983	Conservative	Thatcher I	Heseltine
John Stanley	13 June 1983	13 June 1987	Conservative	Thatcher II	Heseltine
John Stanley	13 June 1983	13 June 1987	Conservative	Thatcher II	Younger
Ian Stewart	13 June 1987	25 July 1988	Conservative	Thatcher III	Younger
Archie Hamilton	25 July 1988	27 May 1993	Conservative	Thatcher III	Younger
Archie Hamilton	25 July 1988	27 May 1993	Conservative	Thatcher III	King
Archie Hamilton	25 July 1988	27 May 1993	Conservative	Major I	Rifkind
Archie Hamilton	25 July 1988	27 May 1993	Conservative	Major II	Rifkind
Jeremy Hanley	27 May 1993	14 June 1994	Conservative	Major II	Rifkind
Nicholas Soames	14 June 1994	2 May 1997	Conservative	Major II	Rifkind
Nicholas Soames	14 June 1994	2 May 1997	Conservative	Major II	Portillo
John Reid	2 May 1997	27 July 1998	Labour	Blair I	Robertson
Doug Henderson	27 July 1998	29 July 1999	Labour	Blair I	Robertson
John Spellar	29 July 1999	7 June 2001	Labour	Blair I	Hoon
Adam Ingram	7 June 2001	29 June 2007	Labour	Blair II	Hoon
Adam Ingram	7 June 2001	29 June 2007	Labour	Blair III	Reid
Adam Ingram	7 June 2001	29 June 2007	Labour	Blair III	Browne
Bob Ainsworth	29 June 2007	5 May 2009	Labour	Brown	Browne
Bob Ainsworth	29 June 2007	5 May 2009	Labour	Brown	Hutton
Bill Rammell	5 May 2009	11 May 2010	Labour	Brown	Ainsworth
Nick Harvey	13 May 2010	4 September 2012	Liberal Democrats	Cameron-Clegg	Fox
Nick Harvey	13 May 2010	4 September 2012	Liberal Democrats	Cameron-Clegg	Hammond
Andrew Robathan	4 September 2012	7 October 2013	Conservative	Cameron-Clegg	Hammond
Mark Francois	7 October 2013	11 May 2015	Conservative	Cameron-Clegg	Hammond
Mark Francois	7 October 2013	11 May 2015	Conservative	Cameron II	Fallon
Penny Mordaunt	11 May 2015	15 July 2016	Conservative	Cameron II	Fallon
Mike Penning	15 July 2016	12 June 2017	Conservative	May I	Fallon
Mark Lancaster	12 July 2017	16 December 2019	Conservative	May II	Fallon
Mark Lancaster	12 July 2017	16 December 2019	Conservative	May II	Williamson
Mark Lancaster	12 July 2017	16 December 2019	Conservative	May II	Mordaunt
Mark Lancaster	12 July 2017	16 December 2019	Conservative	Johnson I	Wallace
Anne-Marie Trevelyan	16 December 2019	13 February 2020	Conservative	Johnson II	Wallace
=== Parliamentary Under-Secretary of State for the Armed Forces ===
James Heappey	13 February 2020	8 July 2022	Conservative	Johnson II	Wallace
=== Minister of State for the Armed Forces ===
James Heappey	8 July 2022	6 September 2022	Conservative	Johnson II	Wallace
=== Minister of State for the Armed Forces and Veterans ===
James Heappey	6 September 2022	25 October 2022	Conservative	Truss	Wallace
=== Minister of State for the Armed Forces ===
James Heappey	25 October 2022	26 March 2024	Conservative	Sunak	Wallace
Leo Docherty	26 March 2024	5 July 2024	Conservative	Sunak	Shapps
=== Parliamentary Under-Secretary of State for the Armed Forces ===
Luke Pollard	9 July 2024	6 September 2025	Labour Co-Op	Starmer	Healey
Alistair Carns	6 September 2025	11 June 2026	Labour	Starmer	Healey
Louise Sandher-Jones	12 June 2026	Incumbent	Labour	Starmer	Jarvis
Louise Sandher-Jones	12 June 2026	Incumbent	Labour	Burnham	Streeting

== Shadow Minister for the Armed Forces ==
Member of Parliament
Kevan Jones (2015 to 2016)
Kate Hollern (2016)
Wayne David (2016 to 2020)
Stephen Morgan (2020 to 2021)
Stephen Kinnock (2021 to 2022)
Luke Pollard (2022 to 2024)
