= Defence Council of the United Kingdom =

Governing body of the British Armed Forces

Agency overview
- Formed: 1964
- Preceding agency: Defence Board
- Jurisdiction: United Kingdom
- Headquarters: Whitehall, Westminster, London
- Agency executive: Wes Streeting, Secretary of State for Defence (Chairman)
- Child agencies: Defence Board; Admiralty Board; Army Board; Air Force Board

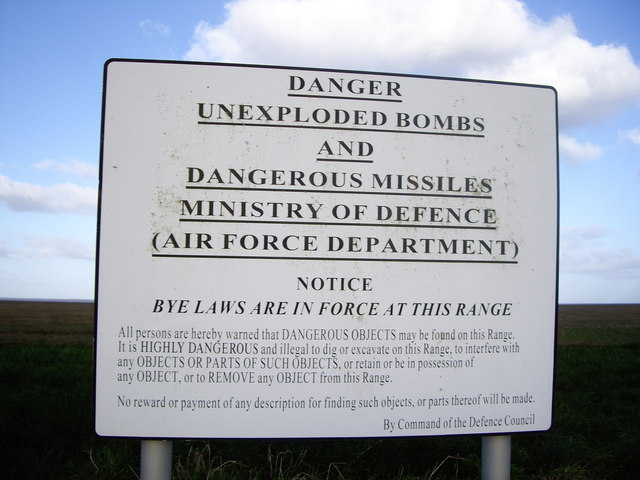
A sign erected under the auspices of the Defence Council

The Defence Council of the United Kingdom is the highest formal governing body of the British Armed Forces. The Defence Council is delegated the responsibility and powers over "command and administration" of the armed forces by the Crown in their capacity as Head of the Armed Forces.

It was established by the "Defence (Transfer of Functions) Act 1964," which established the Defence Council and transferred to it the responsibilities and delegated powers of the previous separate departments that managed the armed forces prior to 1964.

The Defence Council consists of the Defence Board, its principal committee, as well as the Admiralty Board, the Army Board and the Air Force Board. The Defence Board is chaired by the secretary of state for defence, the minister of the crown with "general responsibility for defence" of the United Kingdom.

== Functions ==
Prior to 1964, there were five government ministries responsible for the British Armed Forces: the Admiralty, the War Office, the Air Ministry, the Ministry of Aviation, and a smaller Ministry of Defence. By Orders-in-Council issued under the Defence (Transfer of Functions) Act 1964, the functions of these bodies were transferred to the Defence Council and the Secretary of State for Defence, who heads a larger Ministry of Defence.

The Secretary of State for Defence, who is a member of the Cabinet, chairs the Defence Council, and is accountable to the King and to Parliament for its business. The letters patent constituting the Defence Council vest it with the power of command over His Majesty's Forces and give it responsibility for their administration, or in the words of the letters patent:

…to administer such matters pertaining to Our Naval Military and Air Forces as We through Our Principal Secretary of State for Defence direct them to execute And to have command under Us of all Officers Ratings Soldiers and Airmen of Our Naval Military and Air Forces…

In practice, the Defence Council is a formal body, and almost all its work is conducted by the Defence Board. In addition, the three service boards (the Admiralty Board, the Army Board and the Air Force Board), which are sub-committees of the Defence Council meet annually for each service chief to report to the Secretary of State on the health of their respective services.

== Membership ==
As of August 2026, membership of the Defence Council is as follows:

Members	Title	Name
Ministers	Secretary of State for Defence (Chair)	Wes Streeting
Ministers	Minister of State for Defence Readiness and Industry	Luke Pollard
Ministers	Minister of State (Minister for the House of Lords)	The Lord Coaker
Ministers	Parliamentary Under-Secretary of State (Minister for the Armed Forces)	Louise Sandher-Jones
Ministers	Parliamentary Under-Secretary of State (Minister for Veterans and People)	Calvin Bailey
Civil servants	Permanent Under-Secretary of State for Defence	Jeremy Pocklington
Civil servants	Director General Finance	Aneen Blackmore
Military officers	Chief of the Defence Staff	Air Chief Marshal Sir Richard Knighton
Military officers	Vice-Chief of the Defence Staff	General Dame Sharon Nesmith
Military officers	First Sea Lord and Chief of the Naval Staff	General Sir Gwyn Jenkins
Military officers	Chief of the General Staff	General Sir Roly Walker
Military officers	Chief of the Air Staff	Air Chief Marshal Sir Harvey Smyth
Military officers	Commander Cyber & Specialist Operations Command	General Sir Robert Magowan

== Defence Board ==
The Defence Board is described as the highest committee of the Ministry of Defence, responsible for the full range of defence business other than the conduct of operations. It meets every month and provides strategic direction and oversight of defence matters.

Members	Title	Name
Ministers	Secretary of State for Defence (Chair)	Wes Streeting
Ministers	Minister of State for Defence Readiness and Industry	Luke Pollard
Ministers	Minister of State (Minister for the House of Lords)	The Lord Coaker
Ministers	Parliamentary Under-Secretary of State (Minister for the Armed Forces)	Louise Sandher-Jones
Ministers	Parliamentary Under-Secretary of State (Minister for Veterans and People)	Calvin Bailey
Civil servants	Permanent Under-Secretary of State for Defence	Jeremy Pocklington
Civil servants	Director General Finance	Aneen Blackmore
Civil servants	Chief Executive Officer of Defence Equipment and Support	Andy Start
Military officers and officials	Chief of the Defence Staff	Air Chief Marshal Sir Richard Knighton
Military officers and officials	Vice-Chief of the Defence Staff	General Dame Sharon Nesmith
Non-executive board members	Lead Non-Executive Board Member	Brian McBride
Non-executive board members	Chair of the Defence Audit and Risk Assurance Committee	Dr Brian Gilvary
Non-executive board members	Lead Non-Executive Director to the Defence Nuclear Board	Robin Marshall
Non-executive board members	Chair of the People Committee	Kate Guthrie
