= Admiralty Board =

Governing body of His Majesty's Naval Service

- Flag of the Admiralty Board

Agency overview
- Formed: 1964
- Preceding agency: Board of Admiralty
- Jurisdiction: United Kingdom
- Headquarters: Whitehall, Westminster, London
- Agency executive: Wes Streeting Secretary of State for Defence
- Parent agency: Defence Council

The Admiralty Board is the body established under the Defence Council of the United Kingdom for the administration of the Naval Service of the United Kingdom. It meets formally only once a year, and the day-to-day running of the Royal Navy is conducted by the Navy Board, which does not include any ministers.

The Admiralty Board was established with the abolition of the Board of Admiralty and the integration of the three service ministries into the Ministry of Defence.

The board is chaired by His Majesty's Principal Secretary of State for Defence and includes the professional heads of the navy, as well as various ministers and civil servants of the Ministry of Defence.

== Membership of the board ==
The composition is as follows:

- Civilian
  - Secretary of State for Defence
  - Minister of State for Defence Readiness and Industry
  - Parliamentary Under-Secretary of State (Minister for the Armed Forces)
  - Parliamentary Under-Secretary of State (Minister for Veterans and People)
  - Finance Director (Navy)
  - Second Permanent-Under Secretary for Defence (Secretary of the Admiralty Board)
- Royal Navy
  - First Sea Lord and Chief of the Naval Staff
  - Second Sea Lord and Deputy Chief of the Naval Staff
  - Fleet Commander
  - Assistant Chief of the Naval Staff (Policy)

In addition, the following are usually in attendance:

- Permanent Under-Secretary of State for Defence
- Commander, Allied Maritime Command
- Commandant General Royal Marines
- Warrant Officer of the Naval Service
- Two Navy Board non-executive directors

Notes: Secretariat support is provided by the Naval Staff Policy/Secretariat and Sec/1SL.

== See also ==
- Army Board
- Air Force Board
