= Royal Indian Air Force =

(1932–1947) military force

- Badge
- Active: 1932–1950
- Country: India British India Dominion of India
- Type: Air Force
- Size: 25,000 personnel by VJ Day (1945)
- Command: RAF India
- Nickname: RIAF
- Mottos: "Per Ardua ad Astra" (Latin) (Through Adversity to the Stars)
- Engagements: Notable operations: World War II; Indo-Pakistani War of 1947

Commanders
- Notable commanders: Sir John Miles Steel; Sir Cecil Bouchier; Sir Hugh Walmsley; Sir Thomas Elmhirst

Insignia
- Roundel

- Fin flash

- Ensign

The Indian Air Force (1932–1945) and the Royal Indian Air Force (1945–1950) were the air forces of British India. Granted the 'Royal' prefix in March 1945 during the final months of the Second World War, the Royal Indian Air Force continued as the air force of the Dominion of India until it became a republic in 1950, when the Indian president became India's head of state; replacing the British monarch. It was replaced by the Indian Air Force thereafter.

Alongside the Indian Army and the Royal Indian Navy, it comprised the armed forces of British India and the Dominion of India between 1932 and 1950.

The Royal Indian Air Force's first flight came into being on 1 April 1933 with six RAF-trained officers and 19 Havai Sepoys (air soldiers). The aircraft inventory consisted of four Westland Wapiti IIA army co-operation biplanes at Drigh Road, Karachi as the "A" Flight nucleus of the planned No.1 (Army Co-operation) Squadron.

== History ==
During the First World War, four Indian volunteers – Lieutenants Shri Krishna Chandra Welinkar, Hardit Singh Malik, Errol Suvo Chunder Sen and Indra Lal Roy – served as fighter pilots with the Royal Flying Corps. In September 1917, Sen was shot down and became a prisoner-of-war; and over the next 10 months, Malik was wounded and Welinkar and Roy were killed. ‘Laddie’ Roy destroyed 10 enemy aircraft before he fell, and on 21 September 1918, he was posthumously awarded the RAF’s new Distinguished Flying Cross.

In the inter-war years, the idea of self-determination gained widespread support in British India. In keeping with this, a committee chaired by General Sir Andrew Skeen met at Simla, in August 1925, to investigate the ‘Indianisation’ of the Indian Army’s officer corps. The creation of a military academy equivalent to Sandhurst was also examined. The Skeen Committee reported in April 1927, and one of its recommendations was that Indian cadets be accepted for officer training at RAF Cranwell. The bravery of the RFC’s South Asian pilots was referenced in support of this, and veteran Hardit Singh Malik’s impressive appearance before the committee lent added weight. Discussions between the British and Indian governments continued until Lord Birkenhead, Secretary of State for India, approved the creation of an Indian Air Force on 5 April 1928. The new service would be open to men of all faiths and castes drawn from every part of the subcontinent.

=== Formation and early pilots ===
The Indian Air Force was established in British India as an auxiliary air force of the Royal Air Force with the enactment of the Indian Air Force Act 1932 on 8 October that year and adopted the Royal Air Force uniforms, badges, brevets and insignia. On 1 April 1933, the IAF commissioned its first squadron, No.1 Squadron, with four Westland Wapiti biplanes and five Indian pilots. The Indian pilots were led by RAF Commanding officer Flight Lieutenant (later Air Vice Marshal) Cecil Bouchier.

The first five pilots commissioned into the IAF were Harish Chandra Sircar, Subroto Mukerjee, Bhupendra Singh, Aizad Baksh Awan and Amarjeet Singh. A sixth officer, J N Tandon had to revert to logistics duties as he was too short. All of them were commissioned as Pilot Officers in 1932 from RAF Cranwell. Subroto Mukerjee later went on to become the IAF's first Chief of the Air Staff. Subsequent batches inducted before World War II included Aspy Engineer, K K Majumdar, Narendra, Daljit Singh, Henry Runganadhan, R H D Singh, Baba Mehar Singh, S N Goyal, Prithpal Singh and Arjan Singh.

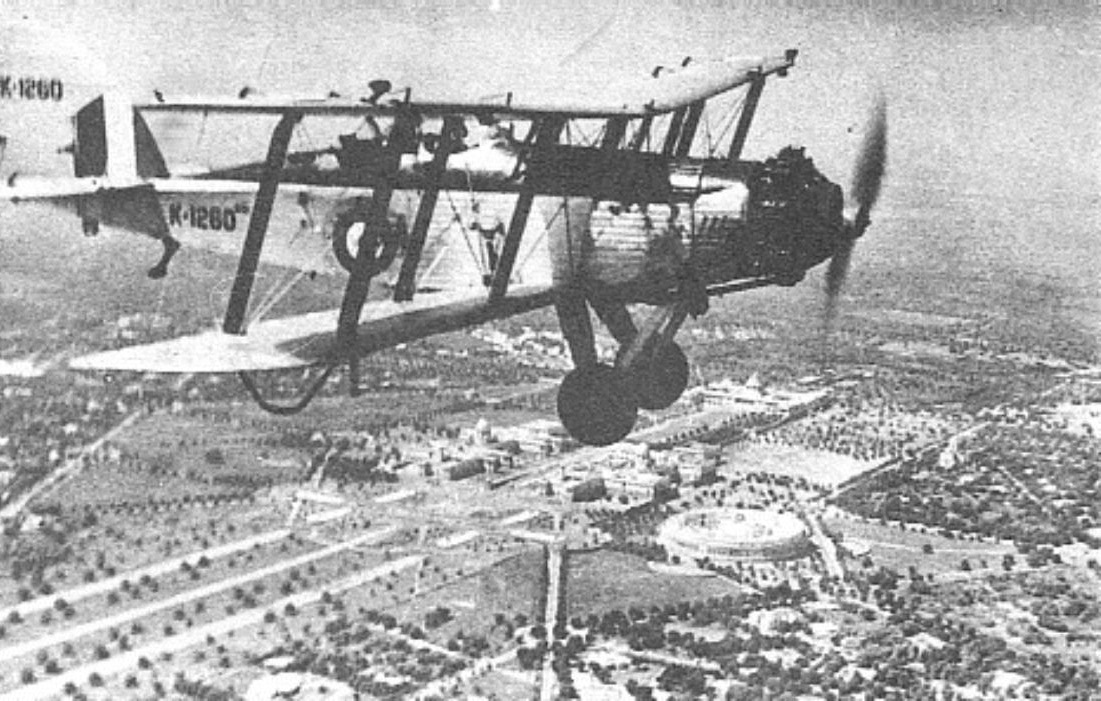
A Westland Wapiti, one of the first aircraft of the Indian Air Force.

Among the earliest fully Indian-trained flying batches was the 4th Pilot Course, commissioned in the 1940s. This group included several future leaders of the Indian Air Force and played a key role in operationalising squadrons during World War II and the immediate post-independence years.

=== World War II (1939–1945) ===
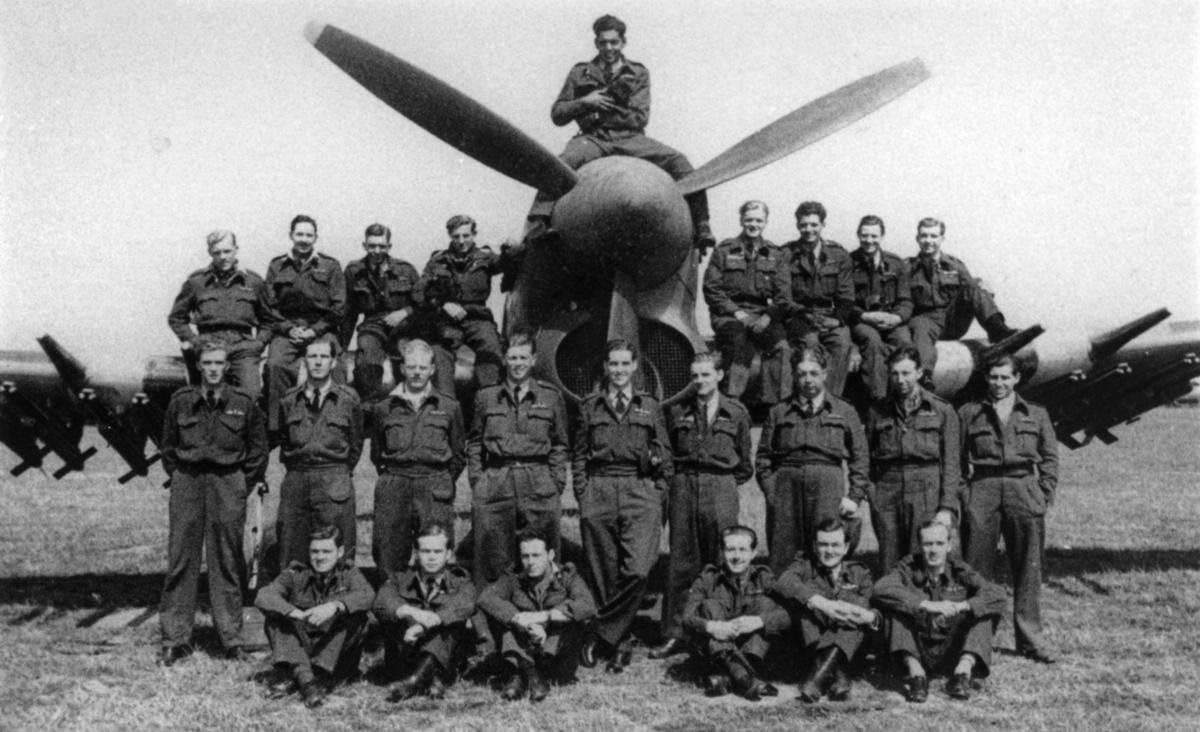
Pilots of No. 263 Squadron pose in front of their Typhoon. Pilot Officer Thyagarajan, an Indian pilot is seated on the engine cowling

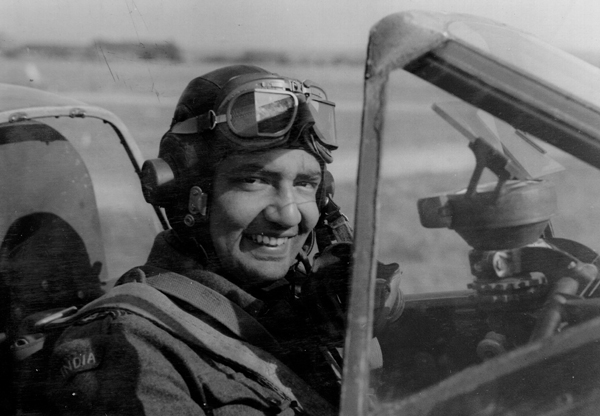
Karun Krishna "Jumbo" Majumdar was the first Indian officer to be awarded the Distinguished Flying Cross.

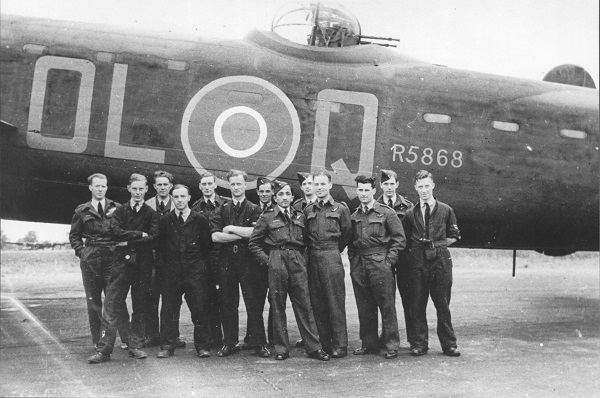
83 Squadron aircrew in front of their Lancaster R5868, Squadron Leader Shailendra Eknath Sukthankar, an Indian Navigator stands in the middle.

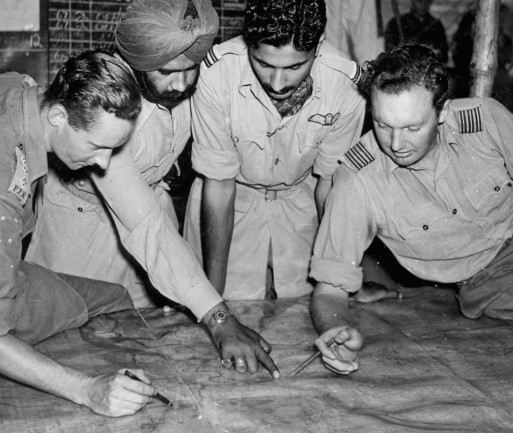
Sqn Ldr Shivdev Singh, second from left, is flanked by a British Indian Army officer of the FF Regt, while F/L Asghar Khan, third from the left, is flanked by a Wg Cdr during a mission planning session in World War II (1945)

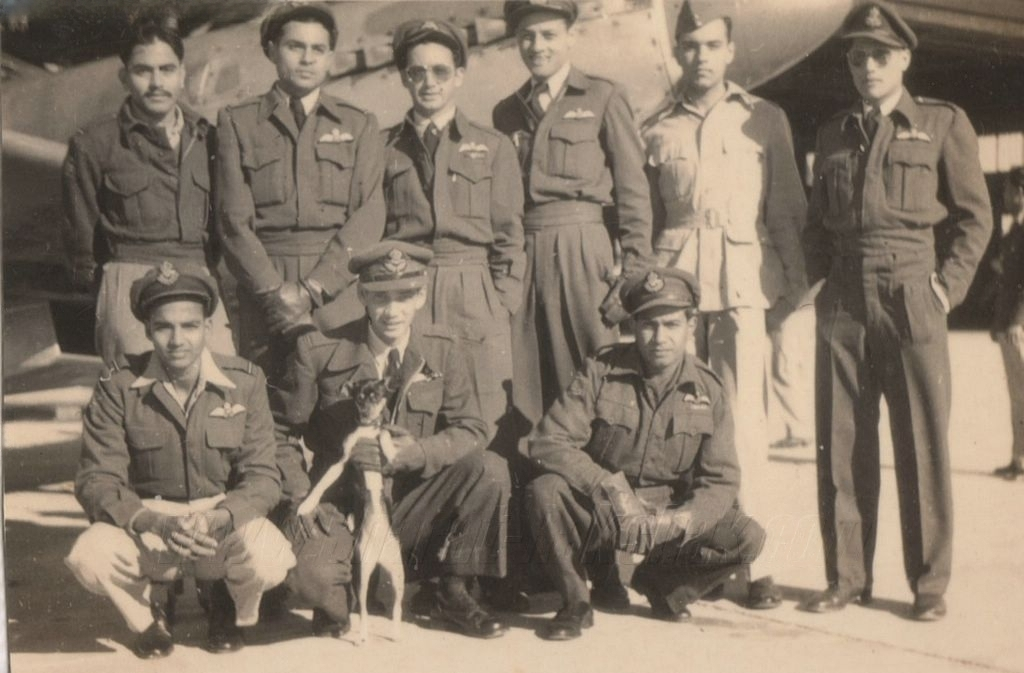
Pilots of No. 4 Squadron RIAF in Miho, Ibaraki (1945). Standing from left: AIK Suares, Toric Zachariah, Leslie Prince Foster, FS Hussain, Rusi Cawasji Bahadurji, and Devaiah Subia Sitting: Muthukumarasami Balan, Andrew Wiseman with a local stray dog, and Joseph Anthony Martin

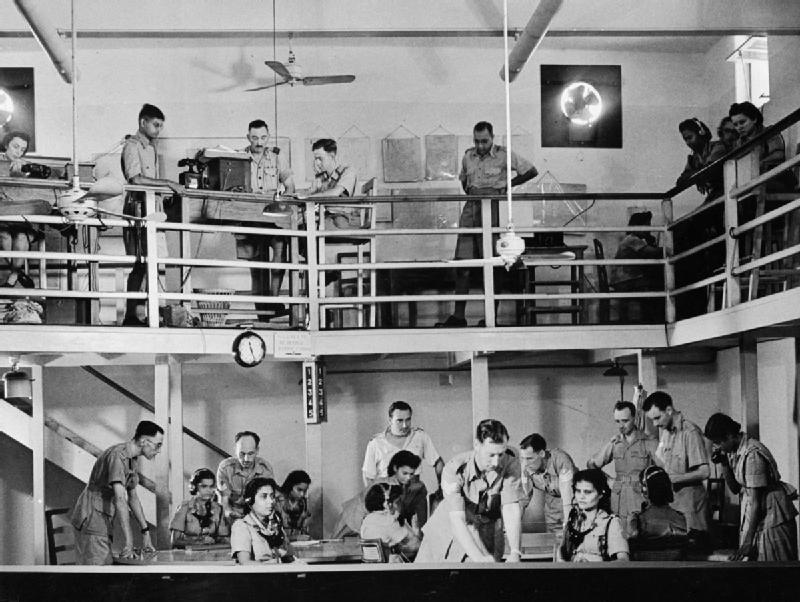
Personnel of the RAF, Indian Air Force and Women's Auxiliary Corps (India) at work in the Operations Room at a Group Headquarters in North-eastern India.

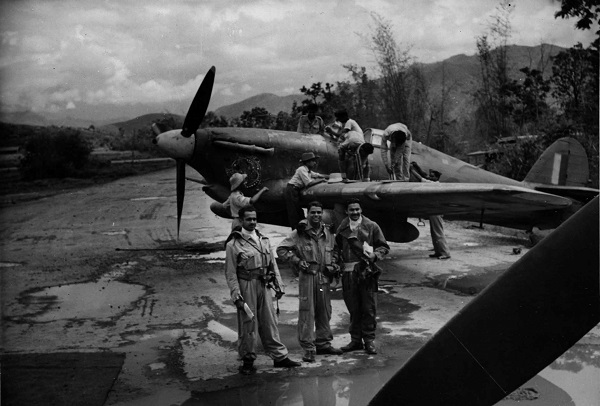
Indian Airforce Pilots after a mission in Burma during WW2

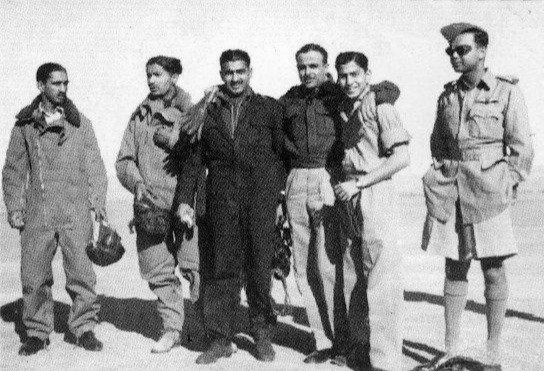
From left: Nur Khan, Asghar Khan, Abdur Rahim Khan, Om Prakash Mehra, Minoo Merwan Engineer, and an unidentified officer, circa 1944.

During World War II, the IAF played an instrumental role in halting the advance of the Japanese army in Burma, where the first IAF air strike was executed. The target for this first mission was the Japanese military base in Arakan, after which IAF strike missions continued against the Japanese airbases at Mae Hong Son, Chiang Mai and Chiang Rai in northern Thailand.

The IAF was mainly involved in strike, close air support, aerial reconnaissance, bomber escort and pathfinding missions for RAF and USAAF heavy bombers. RAF and IAF pilots would train by flying with their non-native air wings to gain combat experience and communication proficiency. Besides operations in the Burma Theatre IAF pilots participated in air operations in North Africa and Europe.

In addition to the IAF, many native Indians and some 200 Indians resident in Britain volunteered to join the RAF and Women's Auxiliary Air Force. One such volunteer was Sergeant Shailendra Eknath Sukthankar, who served as a navigator with No. 83 Squadron. Sukthankar was commissioned as an officer, and on 14 September 1943, received the DFC. Squadron Leader Sukthankar eventually completed 45 operations, 14 of them on board the RAF Museum’s Avro Lancaster R5868. Another volunteer was Assistant Section Officer Noor Inayat Khan, a Muslim pacifist and Indian nationalist who joined the WAAF, in November 1940, to fight against Nazism. Noor Khan served bravely as a secret agent with the Special Operations Executive (SOE) in France, but was eventually betrayed and captured. Many of these Indian airmen were seconded or transferred to the expanding IAF such as Squadron Leader Mohinder Singh Pujji DFC who led No. 4 Squadron IAF in Burma.

During the war, the IAF experienced a phase of steady expansion. New aircraft added to the fleet included the US-built Vultee Vengeance, Douglas Dakota, the British Hawker Hurricane, Supermarine Spitfire, Bristol Blenheim, and Westland Lysander.

Subhas Chandra Bose sent a group of Indian National Army cadets, known as the "Tokyo Boys", to Japan to train as pilots. They went on to attend the Imperial Japanese Army Air Force Academy in 1944.

In recognition of the valiant service by the IAF, King George VI conferred the prefix "Royal" on 12 March 1945. Thereafter the IAF was referred to as the Royal Indian Air Force. In 1950, when India became a republic, the prefix was dropped and it reverted to being the Indian Air Force.

Post war, No. 4 Squadron IAF was sent to Japan as part of the Allied Occupation forces.

=== Partition of India (1947) ===
With the partition of the Indian sub-continent into two separate nations—India and Pakistan—the military forces were also partitioned. This gave a reduced Royal Indian Air Force and a new Royal Pakistan Air Force in 1947.

=== Dominion of India (1947–1950) ===
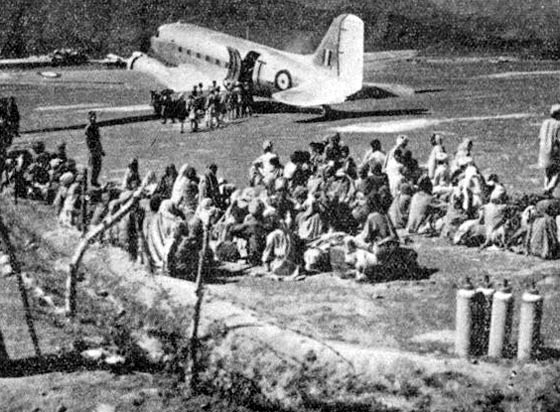
Refugees awaiting evacuation by IAF Dakota on Poonch airstrip, December 1947

After it became independent from the British Empire in 1947, British India was partitioned into the new states of the Dominion of India and the Dominion of Pakistan. Along the lines of the geographical partition, the assets of the air force were divided between the new countries. India's air force retained the name of the Royal Indian Air Force, but three of the ten operational squadrons and facilities, located within the borders of Pakistan, were transferred to the Royal Pakistan Air Force. The RIAF Roundel was changed to an interim 'Chakra' roundel derived from the Ashoka Chakra.

Around the same time, conflict broke out between them over the control of the princely state of Jammu & Kashmir. With Pakistani forces moving into the state, its Maharaja decided to accede to India in order to receive military help. The day after, the Instrument of Accession was signed, the RIAF was called upon to transport troops into the war zone. And this was when a good management of logistics came into help. This led to the eruption of full-scale war between India and Pakistan, though there was no formal declaration of war. During the war, the RIAF did not engage the Pakistan Air Force in air-to-air combat; however, it did provide effective transport and close air support to the Indian troops.

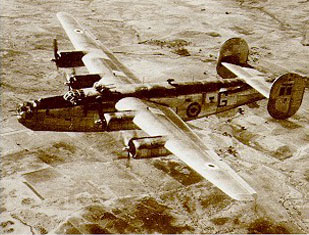
An IAF Consolidated B-24 Liberator heavy bomber over the Deccan Plateau in the early 1950s

When India became a republic in 1950, the prefix 'Royal' was dropped from the Indian Air Force. At the same time, the current IAF roundel was adopted.

== Aircraft ==
Name	Origin	Primary role(s)	Service period	# used	Notes
Airspeed Oxford	UK	transport	1946–1949	5	
Armstrong Whitworth Atalanta	UK	transport	1941–1944	5	
Auster AOP.6	UK	army co-operation	1946–1970	20 ca.	
Avro Anson I	UK	trainer	1942–1945	7	
Boulton Paul Defiant TT.III	UK	target tug	1944–1945	small #	
Bristol Blenheim I	UK	bomber	1941–1942	5	
Consolidated B-24J Liberator	US	bomber	1948–1967	45	(Note: ex-RAF World War Two lend-lease bombers refurbished by HAL.)
de Havilland Devon	UK	transport	1947–1991	22	
de Havilland D.H.86B	UK	transport	1940–1942	2	
de Havilland Dragon Rapide	UK	transport	1941–1945	4	
de Havilland Tiger Moth	UK	trainer	1939–1957	192	
de Havilland Vampire F.3	UK	day fighter	1948–1955	3	
Douglas Dakota	US	transport	1946–1987	206	
Fairchild PT-19	US	trainer	1943–1946	40	
Harlow PC-5A	US	transport	1941–1942	4	
Hawker Audax	UK	army co-operation	1939–1945	7	
Hawker Hart (India)	UK	bomber	1939–1942	7	
Hawker Hind	UK	bomber	1939–1941	6	
Hawker Hurricane	UK	fighter-bomber	1942–1945	?	
Hawker Tempest II	UK	fighter	1945–1955	235	
North American Harvard Mk.II and 4	Canada	trainer	1942–1973	?	
Percival Prentice T.3	UK	trainer	1947–1963	62	(Note: includes 42 built by HAL.)
Supermarine Spitfire Vc & VIIIc	UK	fighter/reconnaissance	1943–1948	19	
Supermarine Spitfire FR.XIVE & FR.XVIII	UK	fighter reconnaissance	1945–1957	120	
Supermarine Spitfire PR.XI & XIX	UK	photo reconnaissance	1947–1959	15	
Supermarine Spitfire T.IX	UK	trainer	1947–1955	10	
Westland Lysander II	UK	army co-operation	1941–1943	25 ca.	
Westland Lysander III.T	UK	target tug	1941–1942	48 ca.	
Westland Wapiti	UK	army co-operation	1933–1942	28	

== Symbols, flags and emblems ==
=== Roundel ===
Roundels
1933–1942

1943–1945

1947–1950

1947-1950 (variant)

1950
- 1933–1942: The RAF roundel was used from 1933 to 1942 as the IAF was first established as an auxiliary air force of the Royal Air Force.
- 1943–1945: This roundel was used from 1943–1945 in the Burma Sector during World War II. The central red disc was removed to eliminate confusion with the Japanese Rising Sun Emblem.
- 1947–1950: The Ashoka Chakra was an interim roundel used from Indian independence in 1947 till India became a republic in 1950.
- 1950: This roundel was adapted by the IAF in 1950 and kept it after India became a republic and is used to this day.

=== Fin flash ===
Fin flash
1933–1942

1943–1947

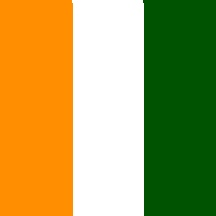
1947–1948

1948–1950

=== Ensign ===

The ensign had a field of air force blue with the Union Jack in the canton and the roundel of Royal Air Force superimposed in centre of inside of Star of India in the fly.

=== Badge ===
post-1945

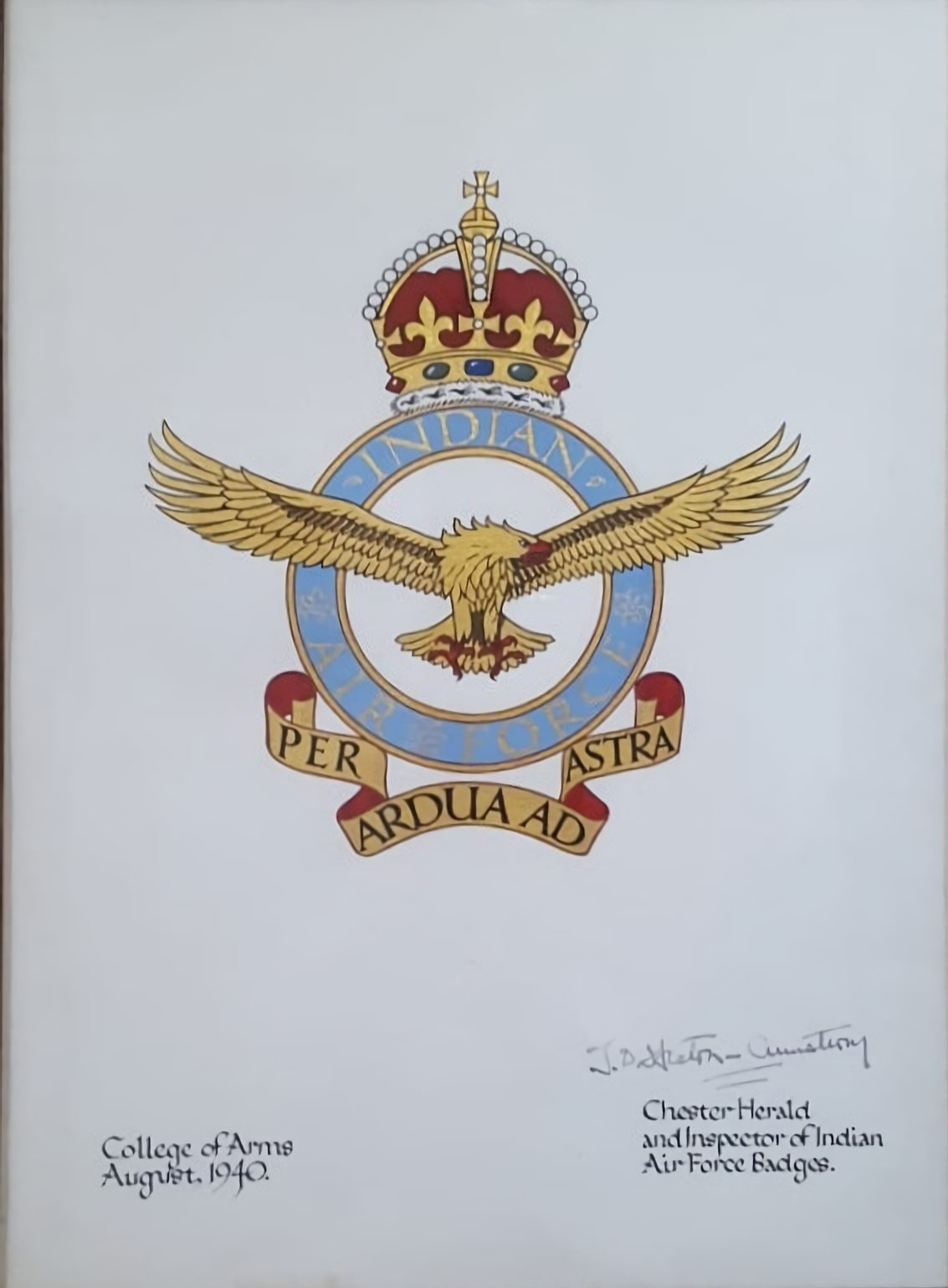
pre-1945

The badge had Tudor crown on top of ring with an eagle augmented in center. A ribbon in fly below with the force motto PER ARDUA AD ASTRA.

== Commanders ==
At Independence, the head of the Air Force designated as the "Air Marshal Commanding, Royal Indian Air Force". On 1 March 1948, the title of "Chief of the Air Staff" was added, with a further re-designation to "Chief of the Air Staff and Commander-in-Chief, Royal Indian Air Force" on 21 June to maintain uniformity across the three armed services.

The "Royal" designation was dropped when India became a republic on 26 January 1950. Thus re-designating the head of IAF to "Chief of the Air Staff and Commander-in-Chief, Indian Air Force".

=== Air Officer Commanding RAF, India (1932–1938) ===
No.	Portrait	Name	Took office	Left office	Time in office
1	Sir John Miles Steel KCB, KBE, CMG	Air Marshal; Sir John Miles Steel KCB, KBE, CMG (1877–1965)	8 October 1932	2 March 1935	4 years, 24 days
2	Sir Edgar Ludlow-Hewitt KCB, CMG, DSO, MC	Air Chief Marshal; Sir Edgar Ludlow-Hewitt KCB, CMG, DSO, MC (1886–1973)	2 March 1935	29 September 1937	2 years, 211 days
3	Sir Philip Joubert de la Ferté KCB, CMG, DSO	Air Marshal; Sir Philip Joubert de la Ferté KCB, CMG, DSO (1886–1973)	29 September 1937	27 December 1938	1 year, 89 days

=== Air Officer Commanding-in-Chief, Air Forces in India (1938–1947) ===
No.	Portrait	Name	Took office	Left office	Time in office	Ref.
1	Sir Philip Joubert de la Ferté KCB, CMG, DSO	Air Marshal; Sir Philip Joubert de la Ferté KCB, CMG, DSO (1886–1973)	27 December 1938	6 October 1939	283 days	
2	Sir John Higgins KCB, KBE, DSO, AFC	Air Marshal; Sir John Higgins KCB, KBE, DSO, AFC (1875–1948)	6 October 1939	26 September 1940	356 days	—
3	Sir Patrick Playfair KCB, CB, CVO, MC	Air Marshal; Sir Patrick Playfair KCB, CB, CVO, MC (1889–1974)	26 September 1940	6 March 1942	1 year, 161 days	—
4	Sir Richard Peirse KCB, DSO, AFC	Air Chief Marshal; Sir Richard Peirse KCB, DSO, AFC (1892–1970)	6 March 1942	27 April 1943	1 year, 52 days	—
5	Sir Guy Garrod KCB, OBE, MC, DFC	Air Marshal; Sir Guy Garrod KCB, OBE, MC, DFC (1891–1965)	27 April 1943	8 March 1944	316 days	—
6	Meredith Thomas CSI, CBE, DFC, AFC	Air Vice Marshal; Meredith Thomas CSI, CBE, DFC, AFC (1892–1984)	8 March 1944	1 April 1946	2 years, 24 days	—
7	Sir Roderick Carr KBE, CB, DFC, AFC	Air Marshal; Sir Roderick Carr KBE, CB, DFC, AFC (1891–1971)	1 April 1946	22 November 1946	235 days	—
8	Sir Hugh Walmsley KCIE, CB, CBE, MC, DFC	Air Marshal; Sir Hugh Walmsley KCIE, CB, CBE, MC, DFC (1898–1985)	22 November 1946	15 August 1947	252 days	—

(On 15 August 1947, the unified RIAF was separated into the Royal Indian Air Force and the Royal Pakistan Air Force)

(**Seconded from the Royal Air Force)

=== Air Marshal Commanding, Royal Indian Air Force (1947–1948) ===
No.	Portrait	Name	Took office	Left office	Time in office
1	Sir Thomas Elmhirst CB, KBE, AFC	Air Marshal; Sir Thomas Elmhirst CB, KBE, AFC (1895–1982) (Note: Seconded from the Royal Air Force)	15 August 1947	20 June 1948	310 days

=== Chief of the Air Staff and Commander-in-Chief, Royal Indian Air Force (1948–1950) ===
No.	Portrait	Name	Took office	Left office	Time in office
1	Sir Thomas Elmhirst CB, KBE, AFC	Air Marshal; Sir Thomas Elmhirst CB, KBE, AFC (1895–1982)	21 June 1948	25 January 1950	1 year, 218 days

== See also ==
- Royal Air Force
- Royal Canadian Air Force
- Royal Australian Air Force
- Royal New Zealand Air Force
