= Crèvecœur-sur-l'Escaut =

- Commune
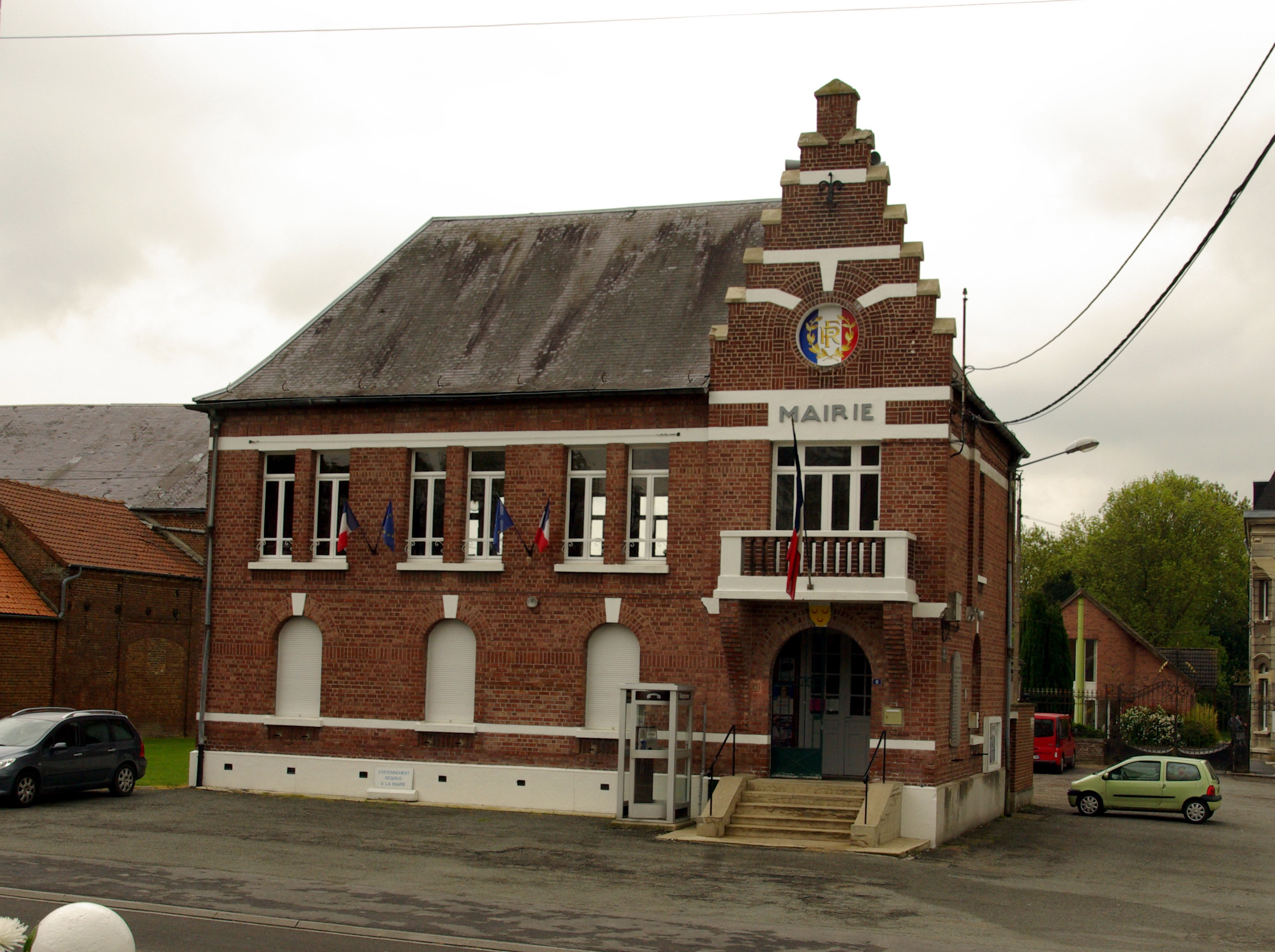
- The town hall in Crèvecœur-sur-l'Escaut

- Coat of arms
- Location of Crèvecœur-sur-l'Escaut
- Location within France Location within Hauts-de-France
- Coordinates: 50°06′23″N 3°15′06″E
- Country: France
- Region: Hauts-de-France
- Department: Nord
- Arrondissement: Cambrai
- Canton: Le Cateau-Cambrésis
- Intercommunality: CA Cambrai

Government
  - Mayor (2020–2026): Gilbert Drain
- Area^{1}: 19.06 km^{2} (7.36 sq mi)
- Elevation: 68 m (223 ft)
- Highest elevation: 147 m (482 ft)
- Lowest elevation: 60 m (200 ft)
- Population (2023): 716
  - Density: 37.6/km^{2} (97.3/sq mi)
- Time zone: UTC+01:00 (CET)
  - Summer (DST): UTC+02:00 (CEST)
- INSEE/Postal code: 59161 /59258
- ^{1} French Land Register data, which excludes lakes, ponds, glaciers > 1 km^{2} (0.386 sq mi or 247 acres) and river estuaries.

Crèvecœur-sur-l'Escaut (French pronunciation: [kʁɛvkœʁ syʁ lɛsko], literally Crèvecœur on the Scheldt) is a commune in the Nord department in northern France.

== Heraldry ==
Arms of Crèvecœur-sur-l'Escaut	The arms of Crèvecœur-sur-l'Escaut are blazoned : Or, 3 crescents gules. (Anneux, Crèvecœur-sur-l'Escaut, Rumilly-en-Cambrésis, Saint-Souplet and Wargnies-le-Petit use the same arms.)

== See also ==
- Communes of the Nord department
