= Anneux =

- Commune
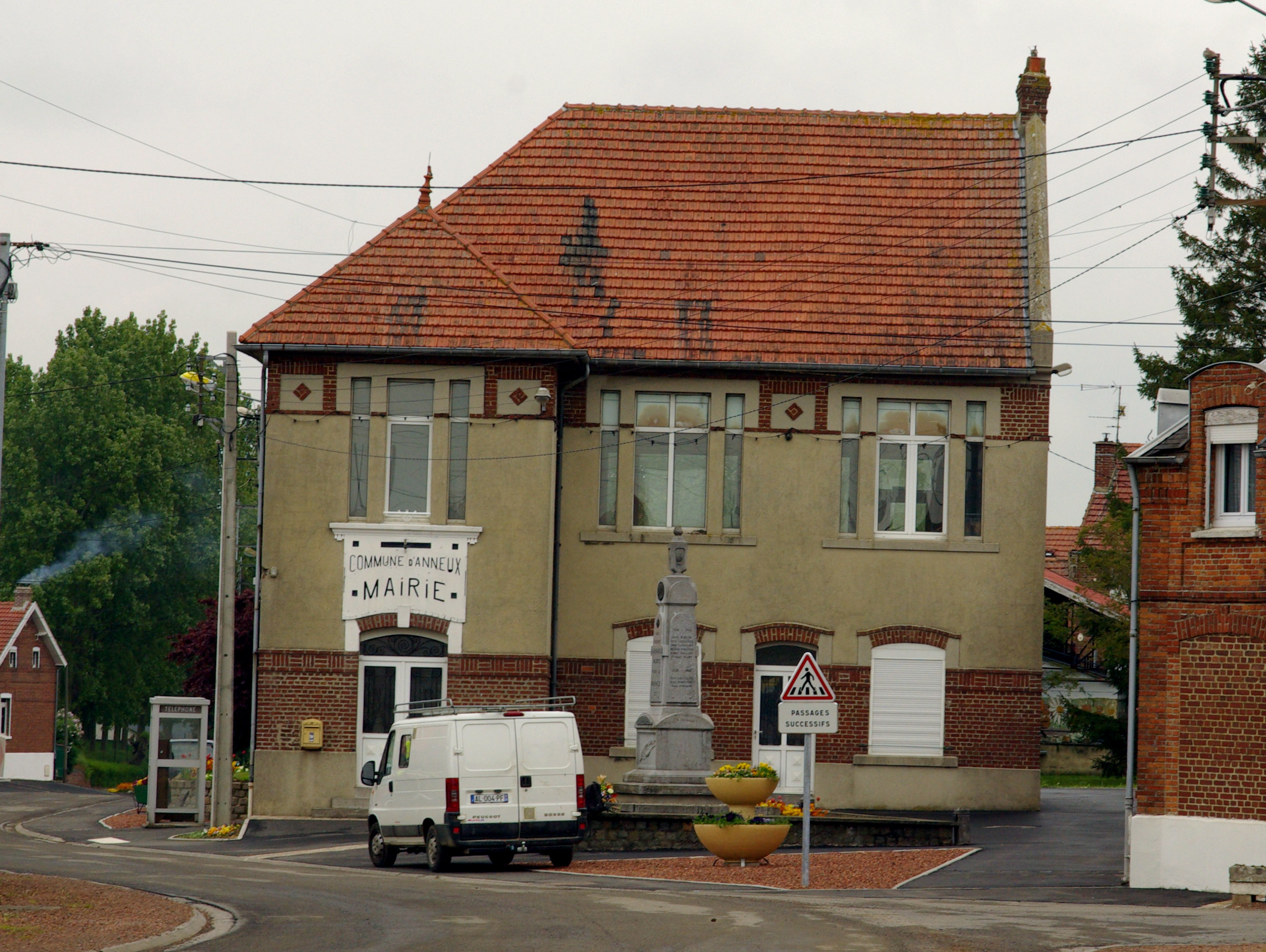
- The town hall in Anneux

- Coat of arms
- Location of Anneux
- Location within France Location within Hauts-de-France
- Coordinates: 50°09′18″N 3°07′36″E
- Country: France
- Region: Hauts-de-France
- Department: Nord
- Arrondissement: Cambrai
- Canton: Cambrai
- Intercommunality: CA Cambrai

Government
  - Mayor (2020–2026): Thierry Lévêque
- Area^{1}: 5.44 km^{2} (2.10 sq mi)
- Highest elevation: 99 m (325 ft)
- Lowest elevation: 56 m (184 ft)
- Population (2023): 258
  - Density: 47.4/km^{2} (123/sq mi)
- Time zone: UTC+01:00 (CET)
  - Summer (DST): UTC+02:00 (CEST)
- INSEE/Postal code: 59010 /59400
- ^{1} French Land Register data, which excludes lakes, ponds, glaciers > 1 km^{2} (0.386 sq mi or 247 acres) and river estuaries.

Anneux (French pronunciation: [anø]) is a commune in the Nord department in northern France.

Its church is dedicated to Saint Léger.

== History ==
Anneux was among the villages fought over at the western end of the Battle of Cambrai (1917).

== Population ==
Historical population
Year	Pop.	±% p.a.
1968	255	—
1975	259	+0.22%
1982	237	−1.26%
1990	223	−0.76%
1999	226	+0.15%
2007	243	+0.91%
2012	258	+1.21%
2017	272	+1.06%
2023	258	−0.88%
Source: INSEE

=== Heraldry ===
Arms of Anneux	The arms of Anneux are blazoned : Or, 3 crescents gules. (Anneux, Crèvecœur-sur-l'Escaut, Rumilly-en-Cambrésis, Saint-Souplet and Wargnies-le-Petit use the same arms.)

== See also ==
- Communes of the Nord department
