= Loudoun MacLean =

British World War I flying ace

Loudoun James MacLean
- Born: 1 February 1893; Ealing, London, England
- Died: Unknown
- Military career
- Allegiance: United Kingdom
- Branch: British Army; Royal Air Force; Royal Navy
- Service years: 1914–1935; 1939–?
- Rank: Squadron Leader
- Units: Royal Engineers; No. 41 Squadron RFC
- Conflicts: World War I • Western Front; World War II
- Awards: Military Cross & Bar

Squadron Leader Loudoun James MacLean MC* (born 1 February 1893) was a British World War I flying ace credited with five aerial victories.

== Biography ==
=== Family background ===
MacLean was born in Ealing, London, the son of Loudoun Francis MacLean CIE (1848–1897), who died in Delhi, India, while serving as superintending engineer of the Jumna Canal.

=== World War I ===
After training as a "Gentlemen Cadet" at the Royal Military Academy, Woolwich, MacLean was commissioned as a second lieutenant in the Corps of Royal Engineers on 1 April 1914. He was promoted to lieutenant on 9 June 1915, and served on the Western Front in France, winning the Military Cross, which was gazetted on 2 October. His citation read:

Lieutenant Loudoun James MacLean, 57th Field Company, Royal Engineers.

"For conspicuous gallantry and determination during the nights of 25th to 31st August 1915, when he skilfully erected a bridge over the Yser Canal near Boesinghe under heavy rifle fire. Although he lost several of his men, he carried the work through satisfactorily."

MacLean was seconded to the Royal Flying Corps, and after completing flying training, was appointed a flying officer on 5 May 1917. In June he was posted to No. 41 Squadron RFC, which was the last RFC squadron flying the obsolete F.E.8 fighter. These were replaced with the Airco DH.5 in July, but these also proved unsatisfactory, and in October they were replaced by the S.E.5a single-seat fighter. MacLean was appointed a flight commander with the temporary rank of captain on 24 October, and promoted to captain in the Royal Engineers on 3 November. He gained his first aerial victory on 29 November, when he and Lieutenants Russell Winnicott, D. V. D. MacGregor, and Essell, shared in the driving down out of control of an Albatros D.V over Douai. The following day, 30 November, MacLean shared in the destruction of two more enemy aircraft; an Albatros D.V over Inchy-en-Artois with Lieutenant D. V. D MacGregor, and a Type C reconnaissance aircraft over Rumilly with Captain Meredith Thomas, and Lieutenants Russell Winnicott and Frank H. Taylor. On 9 January 1918 he shared in the driving down of a Rumpler C east of Marcoing with Second Lieutenants A. T. Isbell and Alfred Hemming, and on 3 February another Type C driven down north-west of Douai shared with Second Lieutenant G. A. Lippsett.

MacLean was awarded a bar to his Military Cross on 6 February 1918, which was gazetted on 2 July. His citation read:

Lieutenant (Temporary Captain) Loudoun James MacLean, MC, Royal Engineers and Royal Flying Corps.

"For conspicuous gallantry and devotion to duty. While leading a patrol he attacked and drove down an enemy two-seater machine and destroyed an enemy scout. He showed the greatest determination in leading patrols and splendid coolness and courage, most of his work being done under very difficult weather conditions."

=== Post-war career ===
MacLean stayed in the RAF post-war, being granted a permanent commission with the rank of captain on 1 August 1919, and resigned his commission in the Royal Engineers the same day.

He served in Iraq, in the Central Air Communication Section, before being transferred to the headquarters of RAF Iraq Command on 1 April 1922, finally returning to England when posted to the RAF Depot (Inland Area) as a supernumerary on 24 January 1923. From there he was posted to the Superintendent of Reserves, based at RAF Northolt on 24 August, then to the RAF Cadet College at RAF Cranwell on 24 October. On 15 September 1924 MacLean was posted to the Inland Area Aircraft Depot, RAF Henlow.

On 1 January 1927 MacLean was promoted from flight lieutenant to squadron leader. He was posted to the RAF Depot at RAF Uxbridge on 15 July 1929, then to the No. 1 School of Technical Training, for engineer duties in No. 1 (Apprentices) Wing, at RAF Halton on 10 November. He left Halton on 2 March 1934, and on the 14th was posted to the Home Aircraft Depot at RAF Henlow, serving there until 3 September. He then served on the Central Trade Test Board at the Reception Depot at RAF West Drayton until 16 March 1935. Finally, on 1 April 1935 Maclean was placed on the retired list on account of his ill-health.

However he returned to service during the Second World War, being commissioned as a temporary lieutenant-commander (A) in the Royal Navy's Fleet Air Arm on 31 August 1939. He resigned from active duty on 8 March 1943, and on 1 June 1944, he was granted seniority with his position in the Royal Naval Volunteer Reserve.
