= Frank Harold Taylor =

- Born: August 11, 1896; Toronto, Canada
- Died: June 7, 1985 (aged 88); Mattituck, New York, USA
- Military career
- Allegiance: George V of the British Empire
- Branch: Canadian Expeditionary Force; Royal Flying Corps
- Rank: Lieutenant
- Units: 109th Regiment Canadian Militia, 204th Battalion (Beavers), CEF, 116th Battalion CEF, No. 41 Squadron RAF, No. 84 Squadron RAF
- Awards: Military Cross

Lieutenant Frank Harold Taylor (11 August 1896—7 June 1985) MC was a Canadian-born flying ace. During World War I, he was credited with ten aerial victories.

== Early life and service ==
Frank Harold Taylor was Toronto born, being the child of Jane Taylor. He was a student during the start of World War I, and joined the Canadian militia circa February 1916 and became a lieutenant. On 13 September 1916, he joined the Canadian Expeditionary Force for overseas service. He subsequently served in two battalions of the Canadian Expeditionary Force before transferring to the Royal Flying Corps.

== World War I aerial service ==
Taylor was confirmed in rank as a Temporary second lieutenant with the RFC on 10 September 1917. He was also assigned to 41 Squadron in September 1917 as an Airco DH.5 pilot. He scored his first victory with serial number B667, helping Russell Winnicott, Loudoun MacLean, and Meredith Thomas destroy a German reconnaissance two-seater plane over Rumilly. The squadron re-equipped with newer Royal Aircraft Factory SE.5as. Flying SE-5a serial number C1752, the young pilot teamed with fellow Canadian Harry Watson to destroy an Albatros D.V over Vitry on 25 January 1918. Taylor would use the same plane for six more wins in the latter part of March, capped by the destruction of another Albatros D.V at 0900 hours on 24 March 1918, followed by a successful balloon busting within the hour.

In May 1918, Taylor returned to Canada for home leave. Upon his return, he was assigned to 84 Squadron. Using SE.5a serial F855, he scored two final victories, on 3 and 10 November 1918. His final tally was an observation balloon and five enemy planes destroyed solo, two enemy planes destroyed in joint attacks, and two German planes driven down out of control.

== Post World War I ==
Taylor gave up his commission and became unemployed by the Royal Air Force on 16 September 1919.

Frank Harold Taylor died on Long Island, New York, on 7 June 1985.

== Honors and awards ==
Text of citation for award of the Military Cross

For conspicuous gallantry and devotion to duty. On one occasion, whilst on offensive patrol, he shot down a hostile scout in flames and a second out of control. On the following day he shot down an enemy triplane, which finally crashed to earth. During the recent operations he has carried out many successful attacks on enemy infantry from low altitudes, and has taken part in over 80 offensive patrols. His gallantry and good service merit the highest praise.
