= Russell Winnicott =

British World War I flying ace

Russell Winnicot
- Born: 24 May 1898; Plymouth, England
- Died: 6 December 1917 (aged 19)
- Burial place: Varennes Military Cemetery, Somme, France; 50°03′16″N 2°31′36″E
- Military career
- Allegiance: United Kingdom
- Branch: British Army
- Service years: 1915–1917
- Rank: Lieutenant
- Units: Devonshire Regiment; No. 41 Squadron RFC
- Conflicts: World War I • Western Front
- Awards: Military Cross

Lieutenant Russell Winnicott MC (24 May 1898 – 6 December 1917) was an English World War I flying ace credited with ten aerial victories.

== Early life ==
Winnicot was the youngest son of Alderman Richard Weeks Winnicott and Anne Smith Winnicott of Mannamead, Plymouth.

== World War I ==
Winnicott was commissioned as a second lieutenant in the Devonshire Regiment on 2 October 1915, and was appointed a temporary lieutenant on 15 October 1916. He was seconded for duty with the Royal Flying Corps on 11 November 1916, and was appointed a flying officer the same day. He relinquished his temporary rank on 12 April 1917.

Winnicott was posted No. 41 Squadron RFC to fly an Airco DH.5 single-seat fighter, and gained his first aerial victory on 6 September 1917, driving down an Albatros reconnaissance aircraft out of control. He scored three more times in September; then his fifth and sixth victories on 30 September made him an ace. He scored again in mid-October, on the 18th. On 26 October 1917 Winnicott was awarded the Military Cross. There was a pause in his scoring while he upgraded to a SE.5a. On 29 November, Winnicott shared a triumph with fellow ace Loudoun MacLean and two other pilots. The next day, Winnicott destroyed an Albatros D.V at 1340 hours; 20 minutes later, he teamed with MacLean, Meredith Thomas, and Frank Harold Taylor to drive a German two-seater down out of control over Rumilly to become a double ace. His final tally was two enemy aircraft destroyed, eight driven down out of control.

Russell Winnicott was killed in a flying accident on 6 December 1917, when he collided with another aircraft, and is buried in the Military Cemetery in Varennes, Somme. On 29 January 1918, he was posthumously promoted to lieutenant, effective 1 July 1917.

=== List of aerial victories ===
Combat record
No.	Date/Time	Aircraft/ Serial No.	Opponent	Result	Location	Notes
1	6 September 1917 @ 1335	DH.5 (A9218)	Albatros C	Out of control	Masnières—Lesdain	
2	18 September 1917 @ 1115	DH.5 (A9218)	Albatros D.V	Out of control	Cambrai	
3	25 September 1917 @ 1810	DH.5 (A9218)	Albatros D.V	Destroyed	South-west of Cambrai	
4	28 September 1917 @ 1810	DH.5 (A9218)	Albatros D.V	Out of control	Bugnicourt	
5	30 September 1917 @ 1600–1630	DH.5 (A9218)	Albatros D.V	Out of control	Eterpigny	
6	30 September 1917 @ 1600–1630	DH.5 (A9218)	Albatros D.V	Out of control	East of Marquion	
7	18 October 1917 @ 1530	DH.5 (A9218)	Albatros D.V	Out of control	Arleux	
8	29 November 1917 @ 1050	SE.5a (B667)	Albatros D.V	Out of control	Douai	Shared with Captain Loudoun MacLean, and Lieutenants D. V. D. MacGregor and E. M. Essell.
9	30 November 1917 @ 1340–1400	S.E.5a (B667)	Albatros D.V	Destroyed	North of Bourlon	
10	30 November 1917 @ 1340–1400	S.E.5a (B667)	C	Out of control	Rumilly	Shared with Captains Meredith Thomas & Loudoun MacLean, and Lieutenant Frank Harold Taylor.

== Honours and awards ==
Military Cross
Second Lieutenant Russell Winnicott, Devonshire Regiment & Royal Flying Corps.

"For conspicuous gallantry and devotion to duty in aerial combats. In a fight against enemy scouts; he drove down two out of control. On another occasion, he destroyed an enemy scout, and on three previous occasions, he drove down enemy machines out of control. His dash and determination were of the highest order."
