= RAF India =

RAF India (1920-38) Air Forces in India (1938-47)
- Active: May 1918–December 1947
- Country: United Kingdom
- Branch: Royal Air Force; Royal Indian Air Force
- Type: Command
- Role: Control of RAF Forces in British India

RAF India, later called Air Forces in India (1938–47) was a command of the Royal Air Force (RAF) that was active from 1918 until Indian independence and partition in 1947. It was the air force counterpart of the British Army in India.

== Origins and history ==
The command had its origins in units of the Royal Flying Corps in India. In November 1915, the War Office despatched No. 31 Squadron to India, the squadron arriving at Nowshera in December. The squadron, including a basic aircraft park, was subsequently transferred to Risalpur. A period of intensive training ensued, during which flights were periodically sent on patrols over the North-West Frontier regions. A second squadron (No. 114 Squadron) was added in 1917. When the RAF was formed in May 1918, the total strength of the air force in India was 80 officers and 600 men. During the 1920s and 1930s, RAF India suffered from under-funding and subordination to the Commander-in-Chief, India; in July 1938, Thomas Inskip, the Minister for Co-ordination of Defence, released a report highlighting the command's "deplorable obsolescence which rendered it un-employable against modern aircraft." At the time, RAF India only received from 4 to 7 per cent of the defence budget for British India, less than the allocation for the 16 horsed cavalry regiments in the British Indian Army.

== Second World War ==
On 3 September 1939 under Air Marshal Sir Philip Joubert de la Ferte, the force comprised No. 1 Group (India) at Peshawar with 5, 20, 27, and 60 Squadrons; 28 and 32 Squadrons reported directly to de la Ferte's headquarters; the AHQ Communications Flight was at Lahore; a Target Towing Flight at Trincomalee; the India Aircraft Depot at RAF Drigh Road, Karachi; and No. 1 Squadron IAF split between Drigh Road and Ambala.

On 1 July 1942 the force had four groups (221, 224, 225, 222, and 223) and two separate squadrons reporting directly to Air Headquarters. No. 221 Group RAF at Calcutta comprised Nos 60 and 113 Squadrons flying Bristol Blenheim Mk. IVs in the light bomber role from Asansol; No. 215 Squadron RAF flying Vickers Wellington medium bombers from Pandaveswar; Nos 62 and 353 Squadrons flying Lockheed Hudsons in the General Reconnaissance role from Dum Dum; and two non-operational squadrons, Nos 20 and 28 flying Westland Lysanders in the Army Co-operation role from Jamshedpur and Ranchi, respectively. No. 223 Group RAF had two squadrons at Kohat for operations along the North-West Frontier.

The air component of the British-American South East Asia Command became Air Command, South East Asia (ACSEA) on 30 December 1943, under Air Chief Marshal Sir Richard Peirse, who had been appointed Air Officer Commanding-in-Chief, Air Forces in India, in March 1942. It was based almost entirely in India and drew its administrative support from the RAF's Air Forces India.

On 1 July 1944 ACSEA comprised No. 222 Group RAF, No. 225 Group RAF, No. 229 Group RAF, and Eastern Air Command, under U.S. Lieutenant General George E. Stratemeyer, itself being made up of the Strategic Air Force (7th Bombardment Group USAAF and No. 231 Group RAF, under Brigadier General Howard C. Davidson of the United States Army Air Force); the U.S. Tenth Air Force (80th Fighter Group, 311th Fighter Group, and 443rd Troop Carrier Group); the RAF Third Tactical Air Force (Nos 221 and 224 Groups, No. 177 Wing RAF, 3d Combat Cargo Group USAAF, and 12th Bombardment Group USAAF); the Photographic Reconnaissance Force (No. 171 Wing RAF and U.S. 8th Photographic Reconnaissance Group); and No. 293 Wing RAF. By January 1945 ACSEA's subsidiary Base Air Forces South East Asia, under Air Marshal Sir Roderick Carr, comprised No. 223 Group RAF on the North West Frontier at RAF Peshawar, No. 225 Group RAF (responsible for the "air defence of southern India and the whole coastline from Bengal to Karachi," by January 1943 controlling Nos 172 and 173 Wings), No. 226 Group RAF, No. 227 Group RAF, and No. 230 Group RAF, carrying out maintenance, training, and administration.

Thomas and Carr from March 1944 were Air Officers Commanding, Air Headquarters India. When Hugh Walmsley arrived at the headquarters he was initially appointed as Air Officer Administration. But by the time Walmsley was appointed as AOC, the command's title had become RAF India once more.

== Postwar ==
=== Strikes in January 1946 ===
A series of demonstrations and strikes occurred at several dozen Royal Air Force stations in the Indian subcontinent beginning on 22 January 1946. As these incidents involved refusals to obey orders, they technically constituted a form of mutiny. The protests arose in response to slow demobilization and return of British troops to Britain, and use of British shipping facilities for transporting United States Army troops. The "mutiny" began at either Maripur or nearby Karachi (RAF Drigh Road) and later spread to involve nearly 50,000 men over 60 RAF stations in India, Burma, Ceylon and as far away as Singapore, Egypt, North Africa, and Gibraltar. The peaceful protests lasted between three and eleven days.

For their part, the British Government argued that there was insufficient shipping available to immediately repatriate British personnel. However, later declassified reports have shown that British troops were deliberately retained in India to control possible unrest from the Indian independence movement.

Some of the airmen involved faced courts-martial. However, the precedent set by this event was important in instigating subsequent actions by the Royal Indian Air Force and later, the Royal Indian Navy in February 1946, in which mutinies on 78 ships broke out. Lord Wavell, Viceroy of India, commented at the time, "I am afraid that [the] example of the Royal Air Force, who got away with what was really a mutiny, has some responsibility for the present situation."

=== Drawdown and disbandment ===
The four major RAF formations under HQ Air Command South East Asia in India and Ceylon at the end of the war were HQ Base Air Forces South East Asia (BAFSEA); Air Headquarters Burma; HQ 222 Group at Columbo, controlling all operational squadrons in Ceylon, largely carrying out maritime duties; and 229 Group, a Transport Command group located in New Delhi. 222 Group disbanded by being renamed AHQ Ceylon on 15 October 1945; it inherited six Liberator squadrons (Nos 99, 356, 203, 8, 160, and 321 RNLAF); four Sunderland squadrons (205, 209, 230, and 240); and No. 136 Squadron with Spitfires.

No. 223 Group was disbanded at Peshawar by being redesignated No 1 (Indian) Group on 15 August 1945; No. 225 Group disbanded at Hindustan near Bangalore by being redesignated No 2 (Indian) Group on 1 May 1946; No. 226 Group disbanded at Palam on 31 July 1946, with its units being transferred to No.2 (Indian) Group; No. 227 Group disbanded at Agra on 1 May 1946 by becoming No. 4 (Indian) Group. In May 1945 No. 228 Group had moved to Barrackpore and absorbed No. 230 Group, and then on 1 May 1946 becoming No. 3 (Indian) Group. No. 229 Group disbanded on 31 March 1947 and its responsibilities were taken over by No. 1 (Indian) Group; and No. 231 Group ceased operations on 1 August 1945, with by that time no units assigned, and disbanded on 30 September.

AHQ India was reformed on 1 April 1946, taking over the role of BAFSEA. A month before, on 1 March 1946, Air Headquarters India Communication Squadron had been established at Safdarjung Airport (RAF Willingdon). Twelve RAF squadrons (225 Group: Nos 5, 30 at Bhopal, 45 at St Thomas Mount; 227 Group: 298 Squadron at Samungli with a detachment at Chaklala; No. 228 Group RAF: 176, 658 AOP, 355 at Digri, 159 at Salbani; 229 Group: 353 and 232 at Palam; and 10 and 76 with Dakotas at Poona) remained in India after 1 April 1946, and AHQ India was placed under joint command of the Indian Government and the Air Ministry.

On 15 August 1947, the unified RIAF was separated into the Royal Indian Air Force and the Royal Pakistan Air Force, and AHQ India was disbanded. Air Marshal Hugh Walmsley, the final commander of RAF India and the unified RIAF, then became Deputy Supreme Commander (Air), India and Pakistan, serving as head of the AHQ, Supreme Commander's Headquarters (India and Pakistan), which had become operational from 11 August. Following the dissolution of AHQ India, two new air force headquarters for India and Pakistan were established, with two and 13 RAF officers, respectively, being assigned to each AHQ to assist with reconstituting the former RIAF into a new RIAF and Royal Pakistan Air Force. A fortnight after the partition of India, 125 RAF officers continued to serve in the subcontinent.

On 10 November 1947, Walmsley formally relinquished his appointments as Deputy Supreme Commander (Air), India and Pakistan, and as Air Officer Commanding RAF Units in India and Pakistan. He then left India for the United Kingdom, transferring his duties to his deputy, Air Commodore Richard Jordan, who closed the AHQ, Supreme Commander's Headquarters (India and Pakistan) on 17 November. On 15 December, the RIAF took command of Palam Air Station from the RAF.

== Commanders ==
=== Commander, Indian Group (1919 to 1920) ===
| No. | Portrait | Name | Took office | Left office | Time in office |
|---|---|---|---|---|---|
| 1 | Tom Webb-Bowen CB, CMG | Air Commodore; Tom Webb-Bowen CB, CMG (1879–1956) | 20 September 1919 | 27 January 1920 | 129 days |

=== Air Officer Commanding RAF, India (1920–1938) ===
| No. | Portrait | Name | Took office | Left office | Time in office |
|---|---|---|---|---|---|
| 1 | Tom Webb-Bowen CB, CMG | Air Commodore; Tom Webb-Bowen CB, CMG (1879–1956) | 27 January 1920 | 31 December 1922 | 2 years, 338 days |
| 2 | Philip Game CB, DSO | Air Vice Marshal; Philip Game CB, DSO (1876–1961) | 31 December 1922 | 5 November 1923 | 309 days |
| 3 | Sir Edward Ellington KCB, CMG, CBE | Air Marshal; Sir Edward Ellington KCB, CMG, CBE (1877–1967) | 5 November 1923 | 27 December 1926 | 3 years, 52 days |
| 4 | Sir Geoffrey Salmond KCB, KCMG, DSO | Air Marshal; Sir Geoffrey Salmond KCB, KCMG, DSO (1878–1933) | 27 December 1926 | 6 February 1931 | 4 years, 41 days |
| 5 | Sir John Miles Steel KCB, KBE, CMG | Air Marshal; Sir John Miles Steel KCB, KBE, CMG (1877–1965) | 6 February 1931 | 2 March 1935 | 4 years, 24 days |
| 6 | Sir Edgar Ludlow-Hewitt KCB, CMG, DSO, MC | Air Chief Marshal; Sir Edgar Ludlow-Hewitt KCB, CMG, DSO, MC (1886–1973) | 2 March 1935 | 29 September 1937 | 2 years, 211 days |
| 7 | Sir Philip Joubert de la Ferté KCB, CMG, DSO | Air Marshal; Sir Philip Joubert de la Ferté KCB, CMG, DSO (1886–1973) | 29 September 1937 | 27 December 1938 | 1 year, 89 days |

=== Air Officer Commanding-in-Chief, Air Forces in India (1938–1947) ===
| No. | Portrait | Name | Took office | Left office | Time in office | Ref. |
|---|---|---|---|---|---|---|
| 1 | Sir Philip Joubert de la Ferté KCB, CMG, DSO | Air Marshal; Sir Philip Joubert de la Ferté KCB, CMG, DSO (1886–1973) | 27 December 1938 | 6 October 1939 | 283 days | |
| 2 | Sir John Higgins KCB, KBE, DSO, AFC | Air Marshal; Sir John Higgins KCB, KBE, DSO, AFC (1875–1948) | 6 October 1939 | 26 September 1940 | 356 days | — |
| 3 | Sir Patrick Playfair KCB, CB, CVO, MC | Air Marshal; Sir Patrick Playfair KCB, CB, CVO, MC (1889–1974) | 26 September 1940 | 6 March 1942 | 1 year, 161 days | — |
| 4 | Sir Richard Peirse KCB, DSO, AFC | Air Chief Marshal; Sir Richard Peirse KCB, DSO, AFC (1892–1970) | 6 March 1942 | 27 April 1943 | 1 year, 52 days | — |
| 5 | Sir Guy Garrod KCB, OBE, MC, DFC | Air Marshal; Sir Guy Garrod KCB, OBE, MC, DFC (1891–1965) | 27 April 1943 | 8 March 1944 | 316 days | — |
| 6 | Meredith Thomas CSI, CBE, DFC, AFC | Air Vice Marshal; Meredith Thomas CSI, CBE, DFC, AFC (1892–1984) | 8 March 1944 | 1 April 1946 | 2 years, 24 days | — |
| 7 | Sir Roderick Carr KBE, CB, DFC, AFC | Air Marshal; Sir Roderick Carr KBE, CB, DFC, AFC (1891–1971) | 1 April 1946 | 22 November 1946 | 235 days | — |
| 8 | Sir Hugh Walmsley KCIE, CB, CBE, MC, DFC | Air Marshal; Sir Hugh Walmsley KCIE, CB, CBE, MC, DFC (1898–1985) | 22 November 1946 | 15 August 1947 | 252 days | — |

(On 15 August 1947, the unified RIAF was separated into the Royal Indian Air Force and the Royal Pakistan Air Force)

=== Deputy Supreme Commander (Air) India and Pakistan, and Air Officer Commanding RAF Units in India and Pakistan (1947) ===
| No. | Portrait | Name | Took office | Left office | Time in office | Ref. |
|---|---|---|---|---|---|---|
| 1 | Sir Hugh Walmsley KCIE, CB, CBE, MC, DFC | Air Marshal; Sir Hugh Walmsley KCIE, CB, CBE, MC, DFC (1898–1985) | 15 August 1947 | 10 November 1947 | 87 days | |
| 2 | Richard Jordan CB, DFC | Air Commodore; Richard Jordan CB, DFC (1902–1994) | 10 November 1947 | 17 November 1947 | 7 days | |

== See also ==
- Royal Indian Air Force
- Royal Indian Navy mutiny
- History of the Indian Air Force
- List of historical aircraft of the Indian Air Force
- List of Royal Air Force commands
