= Christopher Courtney =

Royal Air Force Air Chief Marshal (1890–1976)

Sir Christopher Lloyd Courtney
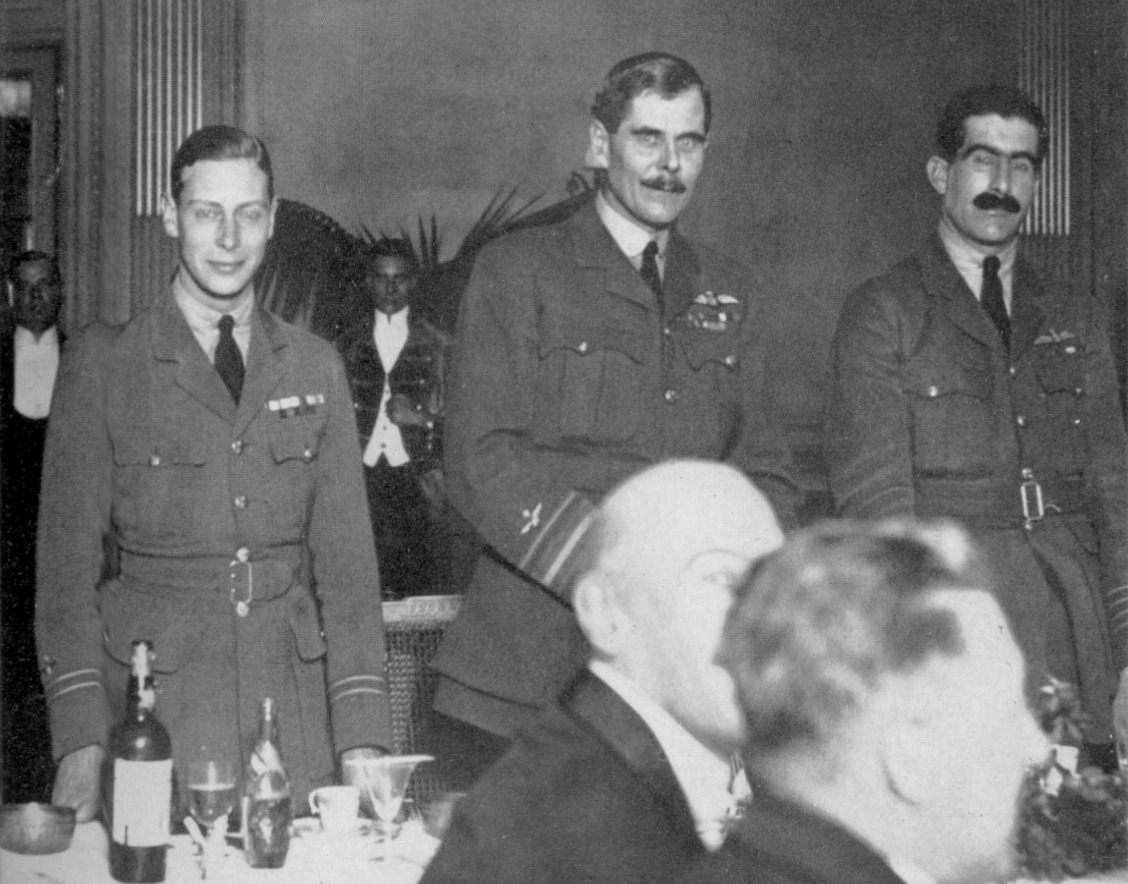
- Courtney (shown on right) with Trenchard and Prince Albert in 1919
- Born: 27 June 1890
- Died: 22 October 1976 (aged 86)
- Military career
- Allegiance: United Kingdom
- Branch: Royal Navy (1905–18); Royal Air Force (1918–45)
- Service years: 1905–45
- Rank: Air Chief Marshal
- Commands: Air Member for Supply and Organisation (1940–45); Reserve Command (1939); British Forces in Iraq (1937–39); Deputy Chief of the Air Staff (1935–37); No. 2 (Indian) Wing (1920–24); Independent Air Force (1918); 11th Brigade (1918); No. 7 Squadron RNAS (1916–17); No. 4 Wing RNAS (1916); RNAS Dover (1915–16); No. 4 Squadron RNAS (1915); Killingholme Naval Air Station (1914–15)
- Conflicts: First World War; Second World War
- Awards: Knight Grand Cross of the Order of the British Empire; Knight Commander of the Order of the Bath; Distinguished Service Order; Mentioned in Despatches; Order of St. Anna, 3rd Class (Russia); Chevalier of the Legion of Honour (France); Commander of the Legion of Merit (United States)
- Other work: Businessman

Air Chief Marshal Sir Christopher Lloyd Courtney (27 June 1890 – 22 October 1976) was a senior Royal Air Force officer.

== RAF career ==
Courtney joined the Royal Navy in May 1905 as a midshipman at Britannia Naval College. By late 1909 he was an acting sub-lieutenant on board HMS Commonwealth.

He fought in the First World War initially as Officer Commanding Killingholme Royal Naval Air Station. He continued his war service as Officer Commanding Royal Naval Air Station Dover, Officer Commanding No. 4 Wing RNAS and then Officer Commanding No. 7 Squadron RNAS. In April 1918, with the creation of the Royal Air Force, Courtney transferred from the Navy to the RAF and at that time he was appointed deputy director of Aircraft Equipment at the newly established Air Ministry. Just before the end of World War I, Courtney was promoted to acting brigadier-general and sent France to command the 11th Brigade which was being established as a subordinate formation of the RAF's Independent Air Force. However, once the armistice was declared, the Independent Air Force's commander, Major-General Sir Hugh Trenchard, returned home and Courtney succeeded him as commander.

After the war he served as Officer Commanding, No 2 (Indian) Wing and then after a tour on the Directing Staff at the RAF Staff College, Andover, he was appointed deputy director of Operations and Intelligence at the Air Ministry. He briefly served as Air Officer Commanding RAF Iraq Command on a temporary basis in late 1932. He was made Director of Training at the Air Ministry in 1933, Director of Staff Duties in 1934 and Deputy Chief of the Air Staff and Director of Operations & Intelligence in 1935. After that he was appointed Air Officer Commanding RAF Iraq Command in 1937 and Air Officer Commanding-in-Chief Reserve Command in February 1939. He became Air Member for Supply and Organisation in January 1940 and remained in that post throughout the remainder of the Second World War until he retired in 1945.

Military offices
Preceded by Sir Hugh Trenchard; As Commander-in-Chief the Inter-Allied Independent Air Force	General Officer Commanding the Independent Force; 1918	Force disbanded
Preceded by Edgar Ludlow-Hewitt	Air Officer Commanding Iraq Command; Temporary appointment 1932	Succeeded by Charles Burnett
Preceded by Edgar Ludlow-Hewitt	Deputy Chief of the Air Staff and Director of Operations and Intelligence; 26 January 1935 – 25 January 1937	Succeeded by Richard Peirse
Preceded by William Mitchell	Air Officer Commanding British Forces in Iraq; 1937–1939	Succeeded by Harry Smart
Preceded by New post	Air Officer Commanding-in-Chief Reserve Command; February 1939 – August 1939	Succeeded by Sir John Steel
Preceded by William Welsh	Air Member for Supply and Organisation; 1940–1945	Succeeded by Sir Leslie Hollinghurst
