= Wargnies-le-Petit =

- Commune
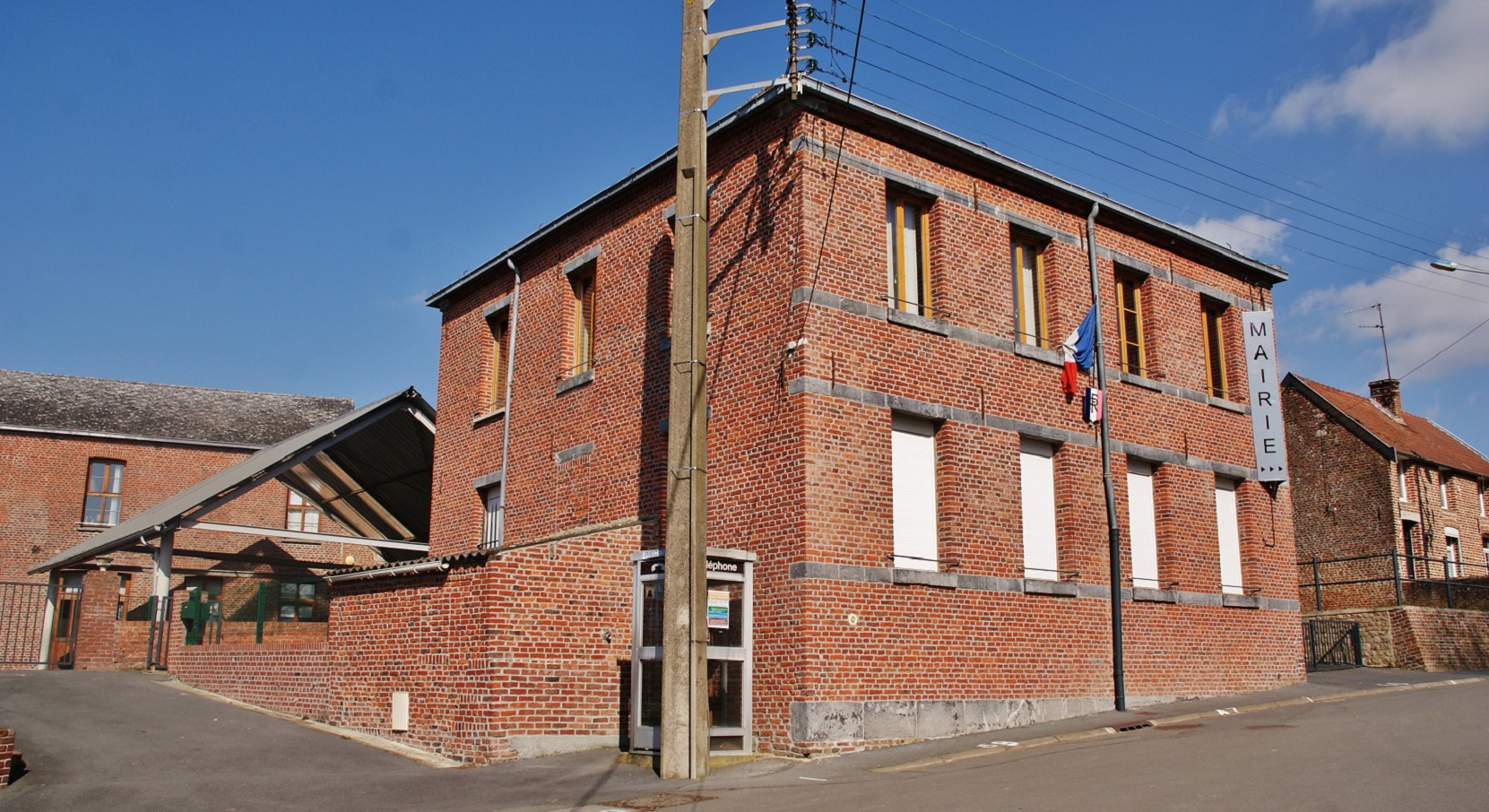
- The town hall in Wargnies-le-Petit

- Coat of arms
- Location of Wargnies-le-Petit
- Location within France Location within Hauts-de-France
- Coordinates: 50°17′46″N 3°40′29″E
- Country: France
- Region: Hauts-de-France
- Department: Nord
- Arrondissement: Avesnes-sur-Helpe
- Canton: Aulnoye-Aymeries
- Intercommunality: Pays de Mormal

Government
  - Mayor (2025–2026): Romain Magy
- Area^{1}: 5.22 km^{2} (2.02 sq mi)
- Elevation: 108 m (354 ft)
- Highest elevation: 130 m (430 ft)
- Lowest elevation: 73 m (240 ft)
- Population (2023): 771
  - Density: 148/km^{2} (383/sq mi)
- Time zone: UTC+01:00 (CET)
  - Summer (DST): UTC+02:00 (CEST)
- INSEE/Postal code: 59640 /59144
- ^{1} French Land Register data, which excludes lakes, ponds, glaciers > 1 km^{2} (0.386 sq mi or 247 acres) and river estuaries.

Wargnies-le-Petit (French pronunciation: [waʁɲi lə pəti]) is a commune in the Nord department in northern France.

== Heraldry ==
Arms of Wargnies-le-Petit	The arms of Wargnies-le-Petit are blazoned : Or, 3 crescents gules. (Anneux, Crèvecœur-sur-l'Escaut, Rumilly-en-Cambrésis, Saint-Souplet and Wargnies-le-Petit use the same arms.)

== Population ==
Historical population
Year	Pop.	±% p.a.
1968	662	—
1975	634	−0.62%
1982	599	−0.81%
1990	676	+1.52%
1999	711	+0.56%
2007	774	+1.07%
2012	777	+0.08%
2017	759	−0.47%
2023	771	+0.26%
Source: INSEE

== See also ==
- Communes of the Nord department
