= Richard Peirse (Royal Navy officer) =

Royal Navy Admiral (1860-1940)

Admiral Sir Richard Peirse KCB KBE MVO DL
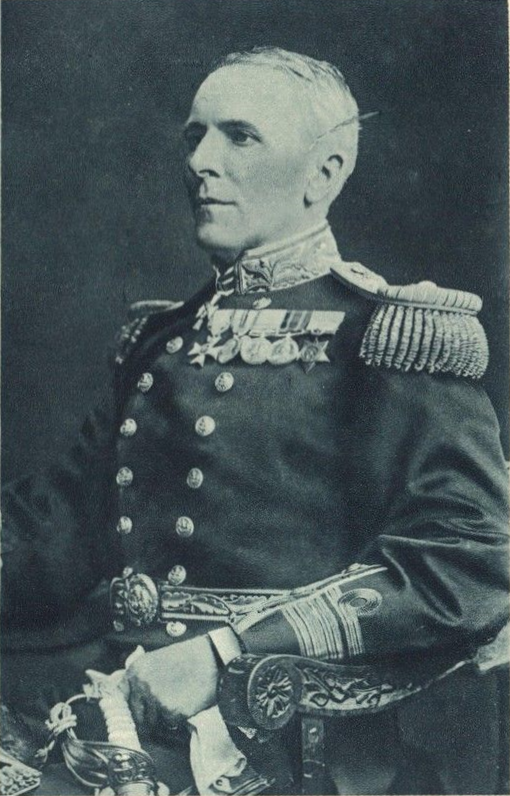
- Sir Richard Peirse, c. 1915
- Born: 4 September 1860; York, England
- Died: 10 July 1940 (aged 79); Belmont, Combe Down, Somerset, England
- Relatives: Air Chief Marshal Sir Richard Peirse (son); Air Vice Marshal Sir Richard Peirse (grandson)
- Military career
- Allegiance: United Kingdom
- Branch: Royal Navy
- Service years: 1873–1919
- Rank: Admiral
- Commands: Commander-in-Chief, East Indies Station; HMS Commonwealth; HMS Bedford; HMS Dido
- Conflicts: Second Boer War; First World War
- Awards: Knight Commander of the Order of the Bath; Knight Commander of the Order of the British Empire; Member of the Royal Victorian Order; Grand Officer of the Legion of Honour (France); Order of the Nile, First Class (Egypt)
- Other work: Deputy Lieutenant of the County of Somerset (1929)

Admiral Sir Richard Henry Peirse, KCB, KBE, MVO, DL (4 September 1860 – 10 July 1940) was a senior Royal Navy officer during the First World War.

== Naval career ==
Peirse joined the Royal Navy in 1873 and, in 1885, developed a new naval director which was to become the fire-control system used in all ships with large guns. Promoted to captain in 1900, he commanded HMS Dido during the Second Boer War.

Promoted to rear admiral in February 1909, Peirse was appointed Commander-in-Chief, East Indies Station in 1913. Then promoted to vice admiral in October 1914, he served in the First World War taking part in the attack on Smyrna in 1915, where he outgunned the Turkish Fleet. He continued in his role on the East Indies Station until December 1915. He was promoted to admiral in March 1918.

After the war Peirse became Naval Member of the Central Committee of the Board of Invention and Research. He retired from the navy in January 1919.

== Personal life ==
Peirse lived in Upper Norwood in London and there is a memorial to him in Bedale Parish Church in North Yorkshire.

He and his wife Blanche Melville Wemyss-Whittaker lived for many years at Fiesole on Bathwick Hill in Bath, Somerset before moving to Belmont in Combe Down, where he died in 1940.

His son, Sir Richard Peirse, became air chief marshal.

== Awards and decorations ==
- Knight Commander of the Order of the Bath – 22 June 1914
- Knight Commander of the Order of the British Empire – 7 June 1918
- Member of the Royal Victorian Order – 9 October 1903
- Legion of Honour, Grand officer (France) – 18 June 1918
- Order of the Nile, First Class (Egypt) – 25 October 1918

Military offices
Preceded by Sir Alexander Bethell	Commander-in-Chief, East Indies Station; 1913–1915	Succeeded by Sir Rosslyn Wemyss
