= Meredith Thomas =

Royal Air Force air marshal (1892–1984)

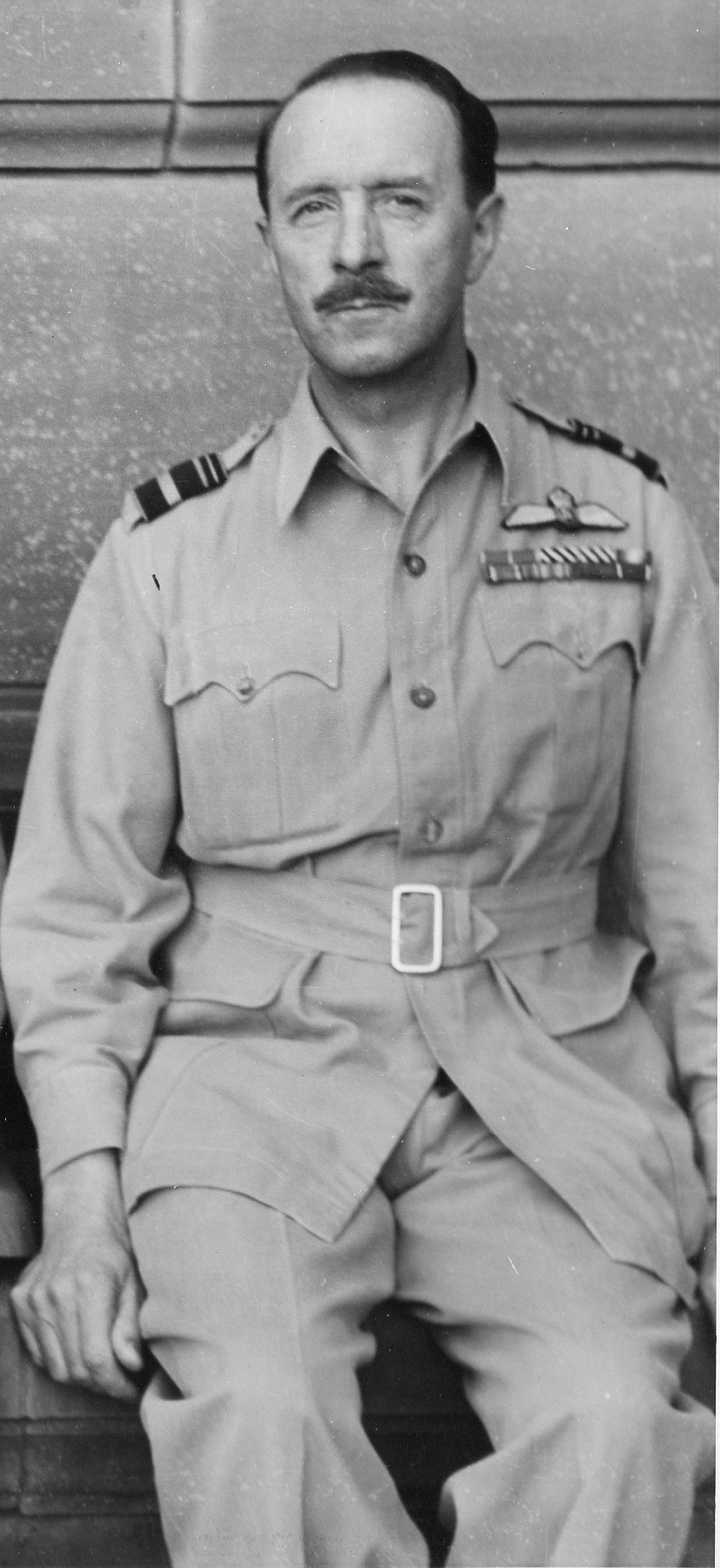
- Born: 6 June 1892; Felindre, Radnorshire, Wales
- Died: 20 May 1984 (aged 91); Gloucester, Gloucestershire, England
- Military career
- Allegiance: United Kingdom
- Branch: British Army (1914–1918); Royal Air Force (1918–1946)
- Service years: 1914–1946
- Rank: Air Vice Marshal
- Units: Queen's Westminsters; Welsh Regiment; No. 41 Squadron RFC; No. 6 Squadron RAF; No. 30 Squadron RAF
- Commands: Air Officer Commanding, RAF India (1944–1946); No. 23 Group RAF (1943–44); No. 6 Armament Training Camp, RAF Warmwell (1937–1938)
- Conflicts: First World War; Second World War
- Awards: Companion of the Order of the Star of India; Commander of the Order of the British Empire; Distinguished Flying Cross; Air Force Cross; Mentioned in Despatches (2)

Air Vice Marshal Meredith Thomas, CSI, CBE, DFC, AFC (6 July 1892 – 20 May 1984) was a senior commander in the Royal Air Force during the Second World War. He began his career as a flying ace during the First World War, credited with five aerial victories.

== Early life ==
Meredith Thomas was born in Felindre, Radnorshire, Wales on 6 July 1892.

== First World War ==
Thomas joined the Queen's Westminsters in August 1914. He went to France in January 1915, and served as an infantryman on the Western Front until 2 December 1915, before being commissioned into the Welsh Regiment.

Thomas transferred to the Royal Flying Corps in October 1916 and was trained as a pilot, being assigned in 1917 to No. 41 Squadron to fly a Royal Aircraft Factory FE.8, and later an Airco DH.5. He became a flight commander with the rank of acting captain on 29 March 1917. He claimed his first two victories in September 1917 while flying an Airco DH.5, destroying an Albatros D.III on the 25th near Cambrai, and another on the 28th at Bugnicourt, France. After transferring to a Royal Aircraft Factory SE.5a, he claimed three wins over Albatros D.Vs. On 30 November 1917, he destroyed one D.V over Rumilly, France at 1345 hours. A quarter-hour later, he joined with squadron-mates Russell Winnicott, Loudoun MacLean, and Frank Harold Taylor in driving another down out of control. His final victory came on 6 December 1917 at 1450 hours, when he and two other pilots sent a D.V down out of control over Sailly, France. Having thus become an ace, he was then returned to instructor duty in England.

== Interwar period ==
In 1919 Thomas was stationed in Germany; while there, he received the Air Force Cross on 3 June 1919. From 1920 to 1923 he served in Iraq as a flight lieutenant filling a flight commander's position. On 13 February 1920, he was posted to No. 6 Squadron RAF, operating Royal Aircraft Factory R.E.8s and Bristol F.2 Fighters from Mosul, Iraq; he was Mentioned in Despatches on 19 April 1921. In mid 1921, he transferred to No. 30 Squadron in Baghdad to fly an Airco DH.9a; he was again Mentioned in Despatches, on 28 October 1921. He was awarded the Distinguished Flying Cross on 10 October 1922.

Thomas returned from foreign service to begin attending RAF Staff College on 1 May 1923. On 5 May 1924, he was graduated to staff duty. He was promoted to squadron leader on 1 January 1926. On 1 September 1928, he began instructing cadets at the Royal Air Force College Cranwell.

Once again posted overseas, Thomas began attending the Command and Staff College, Quetta on 24 December 1931. In December 1933, he was moved to the Air Staff, Headquarters RAF India. His promotion to wing commander came on 1 January 1934.

Thomas returned to the British Isles to assume command of No. 6 Armament Training Camp, RAF Warmwell on 24 May 1937. The following year, on 6 May, he became Senior Air Staff Officer for No. 5 Group RAF.

== Second World War and beyond ==
With the advent of war, Thomas moved up in responsibility, becoming Director of Technical Training on 7 August 1940. On 1 December, he was appointed an acting air commodore. On 24 December 1941, he became SASO of Flying Training Command.

On 2 August 1943, Thomas was simultaneously raised to acting air vice marshal and appointed Air Officer Commanding of No. 23 Group RAF. On 8 March 1944, he became Air Officer Commanding, Air Headquarters India. He held the post through war's end.

On 22 January 1946, Thomas was retained as an air vice marshal. His retirement followed on 18 April 1946. He died on 20 May 1984, at Gloucester, Gloucestershire, England.

Military offices
Preceded by Sir Guy Garrod; As Deputy AOC in C, RAF India	Air Officer Commanding, RAF India; 1944–1946	Succeeded by Sir Roderick Carr
