= Edgar Ludlow-Hewitt =

Royal Air Force Air Chief Marshal (1886–1973)

Air Chief Marshal Sir Edgar Ludlow-Hewitt GCB, GBE, CMG, DSO, MC
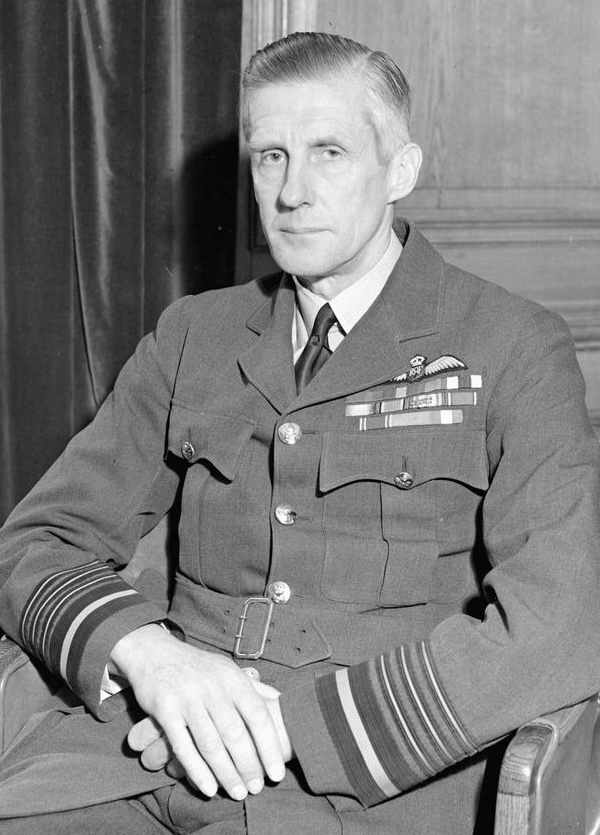
- Air Chief Marshal Ludlow-Hewitt
- Born: 9 June 1886
- Died: 15 August 1973 (aged 87)
- Military career
- Allegiance: United Kingdom
- Branch: British Army (1905–18); Royal Air Force (1918–45)
- Service years: 1905–45
- Rank: Air Chief Marshal
- Commands: Inspector-General of the RAF (1940–45); Bomber Command (1937–40); RAF India (1935–37); Iraq Command (1930–32); RAF Staff College (1926–30); 3rd (Corps) Wing (1916–17); No. 3 Squadron (1915–16); No. 15 Squadron (1915)
- Conflicts: First World War; Second World War
- Awards: Knight Grand Cross of the Order of the Bath; Knight Grand Cross of the Order of the British Empire; Companion of the Order of St Michael and St George; Distinguished Service Order; Military Cross; Mentioned in Despatches (6); Knight of the Legion of Honour (France)

Air Chief Marshal Sir Edgar Rainey Ludlow-Hewitt (9 June 1886 – 15 August 1973) was a senior Royal Air Force commander.

== Early life ==
He was the second son and the second of five children of the Rev. Thomas Arthur Ludlow-Hewitt (17 May 1850 - 16 June 1936) of Clancoole, County Cork and later vicar of Minety, Wiltshire and Edith Annie Hudson (9 March 1854 - 15 November 1944).

== First World War ==
Educated at Eastman's School, Radley College and Sandhurst, Ludlow-Hewitt was commissioned into the Royal Irish Rifles in 1905, but transferred to the Royal Flying Corps (RFC) before the First World War, where he qualified on 11 September 1914 for the Royal Aero Club's Aviator's Certificate no. 886. During the war he served first as a pilot in No. 1 Squadron Royal Flying Corps and then later as the Officer Commanding No. 15 Squadron and No. 3 Squadron on the Western Front. In 1916 Ludlow-Hewitt took up command of the 3rd (Corps) Wing as a temporary lieutenant colonel. Late in the following year, he was promoted to brigadier general and made the Inspector of Training at the headquarters of the RFC Training Division. Like other members of the RFC, he transferred to the Royal Air Force (RAF) on its creation on 1 April 1918. It was also on that date that he became General Officer Commanding (GOC) the Training Division. Less than two months later he was appointed GOC the 10th Brigade. He was awarded the Military Cross in 1916, and the Distinguished Service Order in the 1918 New Year Honours.

== Later career ==
He was appointed Air Secretary in 1922 and Commandant of the RAF Staff College in 1926. He went on to be Air Officer Commanding Iraq Command in 1930, Deputy Chief of the Air Staff and Director of Operations and Intelligence in 1933 and Air Officer Commanding the RAF India in 1935. In 1937 Ludlow-Hewitt was promoted to Air Chief Marshal and appointed Air Officer Commanding-in-Chief of Bomber Command. In the Second World War, Ludlow-Hewitt was replaced by Portal in April 1940 because of Ludlow-Hewitt's insistence on the formation of Operational Training Units, at the expense of the availability of front line airmen. He spent the remainder of the war as Inspector-General of the RAF and did not retire until November 1945, making him the RAF officer with the longest service as an Air Chief Marshal during the 20th century.

== Honours ==
Ludlow-Hewitt was appointed Air Aid-de-Camp to the King in 1921, and Principal Air ADC in 1943.

Ludlow-Hewitt was appointed a Companion of the Order of St Michael and St George (CMG) in the 1919 Birthday Honours, a Companion of the Order of the Bath (CB) in the 1928 Birthday Honours, promoted to Knight Commander of the Order of the Bath (KCB) in the 1933 New Year Honours, appointed a Knight Grand Cross of the Order of the British Empire (GBE) in the 1943 New Year Honours, and promoted to Knight Grand Cross of the Order of the Bath (GCB) in the 1946 New Year Honours.

He was appointed a Deputy Lieutenant for Wiltshire in 1952.

Military offices
New title	General Officer Commanding X Brigade; 1918	Unknown
Preceded by Robert Brooke-Popham	Commandant RAF Staff College, Andover; 1926–1930	Succeeded by Philip Joubert de la Ferté
Preceded by Robert Brooke-Popham	Air Officer Commanding Iraq Command; 1930–1932	Succeeded by Christopher Courtney
Preceded by Charles Burnett	Deputy Chief of the Air Staff and Director of Operations and Intelligence; 1 February 1933 – 26 January 1935	Succeeded by Christopher Courtney
Preceded by Sir John Steel	Air Officer Commanding RAF India; 1935–1937	Succeeded by Sir Philip Joubert de la Ferté
Preceded by Sir John Steel	Air Officer Commanding-in-Chief Bomber Command; 1937–1940	Succeeded by Sir Charles Portal
Preceded by Sir Leslie Gossage	Inspector-General of the RAF; 1940–1945	Succeeded by Sir Arthur Barratt
