= Guy Garrod =

Royal Air Force Air Chief Marshal (1891–1965)

Sir Guy Garrod
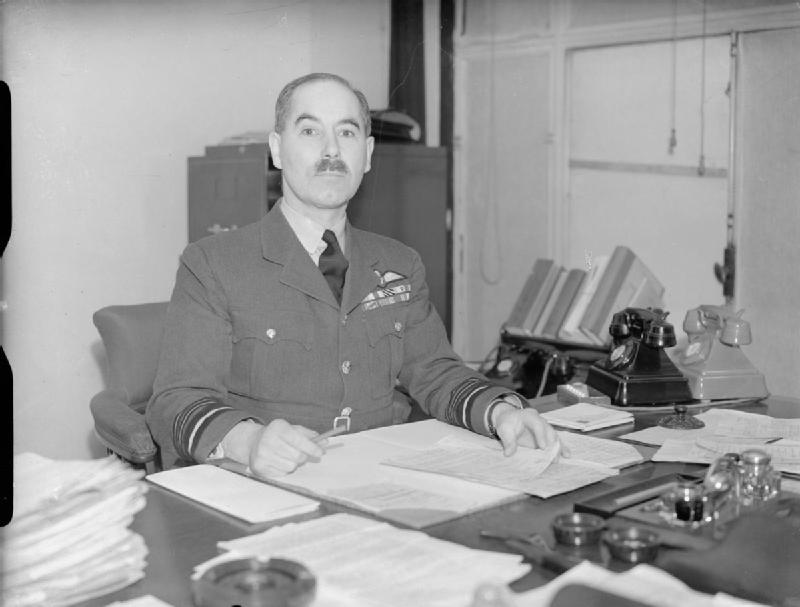
- Garrod as the Air Member for Training at his desk at Adastral House, London.
- Born: 13 April 1891
- Died: 3 January 1965 (aged 73)
- Military career
- Allegiance: United Kingdom
- Branch: British Army (1914–18); Royal Air Force (1918–48)
- Service years: 1914–48
- Rank: Air Chief Marshal
- Commands: Mediterranean and Middle East (1945); Air Command South East Asia (1944–45); Air Forces in India (1943–44); Armament Group (1937–38); RAF North Weald (1927–28); 81st Wing (1918–19); No. 13 Squadron (1917–18)
- Conflicts: First World War; Second World War
- Awards: Knight Grand Cross of the Order of the British Empire; Knight Commander of the Order of the Bath; Military Cross; Distinguished Flying Cross; Mentioned in Despatches (3); Commander of the Legion of Merit (United States); Order of the Cloud and Banner (China); Grand Officer of the Royal Order of George I (Greece)
- Other work: Chairman of Malkay Investments Ltd

Air Chief Marshal Sir Alfred Guy Roland Garrod, GBE, KCB, MC, DFC (13 April 1891 – 3 January 1965) was a senior British Royal Air Force officer.

== RAF career ==
He was born the third eldest son of Herbert Baring Garrod, barrister-at-law and educated at Bradfield College and University College, Oxford. Garrod was originally commissioned into The Leicestershire Regiment of the British Army in 1914 and only transferred to the Royal Flying Corps in 1915. His younger brother Roland Perceval Garrod was killed in action the same year. Garrod was given the temporary rank of major in the newly formed Royal Air Force in April 1918.

He joined the Directing Staff at the RAF staff College in 1923 and then became Chief Instructor at Oxford University Air Squadron in 1928 before moving to RAF Headquarters in Iraq in 1931. He was made deputy director of Organisation at the Air Ministry in 1934 and Air Officer Commanding the Armament Group in 1937.

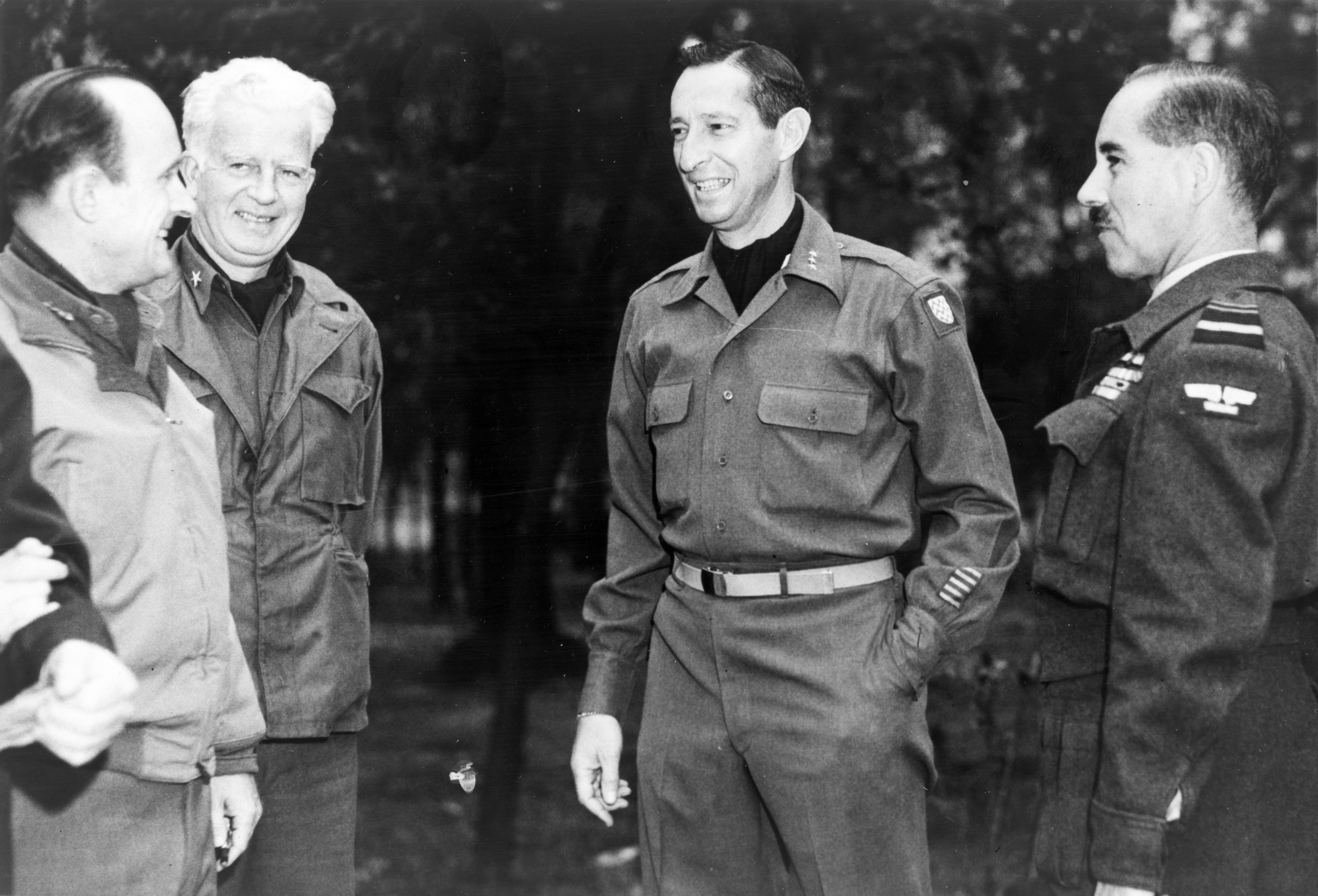
From left to right, Alfred Gruenther, Donald W. Brann, Mark W. Clark, and Guy Garrod.

He served in the Second World War initially as Director of Equipment at the Air Ministry and then as Air Member for Training from 1940. He continued his war service as Deputy Air Officer Commanding-in-Chief, India from May 1943 and as Deputy Allied Air Commander-in-Chief at South East Asia Command from October 1943. In November 1944 he temporarily stepped up to be Allied Air Commander-in-Chief when Air Chief Marshal Sir Trafford Leigh-Mallory, the nominated successor to the then incumbent Air Chief Marshal Sir Richard Peirse, was killed in an air crash on his way to take up the appointment. Garrod held this acting appointment until February 1945 when Air Chief Marshal Sir Keith Park took up the permanent appointment. In March 1945 Garrod was appointed RAF Commander-in-Chief, Mediterranean and Middle East.

After the war he was made Permanent RAF Representative on the Military Staff Committee of the United Nations and then Head of the RAF delegation to Washington D. C. from 1946 until he retired in 1948.

== Family ==
In 1918 he married Cicely Evelyn Bray. Following the death of his first wife in 1960, he married Doris Eleanor Baker in 1961.

Military offices
New title Post established	Air Member for Training; 1940–1943	Succeeded by Sir Peter Drummond
Preceded by Sir Richard Peirse	Commander-in-Chief Air Forces in India; 1943–1944	Succeeded by Meredith Thomas
Preceded by Sir Richard Peirse	Commander-in-Chief Air Command South East Asia; Temporary appointment 1944–1945	Succeeded by Sir Keith Park
Preceded by Sir John Slessor	Commander-in-Chief RAF Mediterranean and Middle East; March – August 1945	Succeeded by Sir Charles Medhurst
