= Richard Peirse =

Royal Air Force Air Chief Marshal (1892-1970)

Air Chief Marshal Sir Richard Peirse KCB DSO AFC
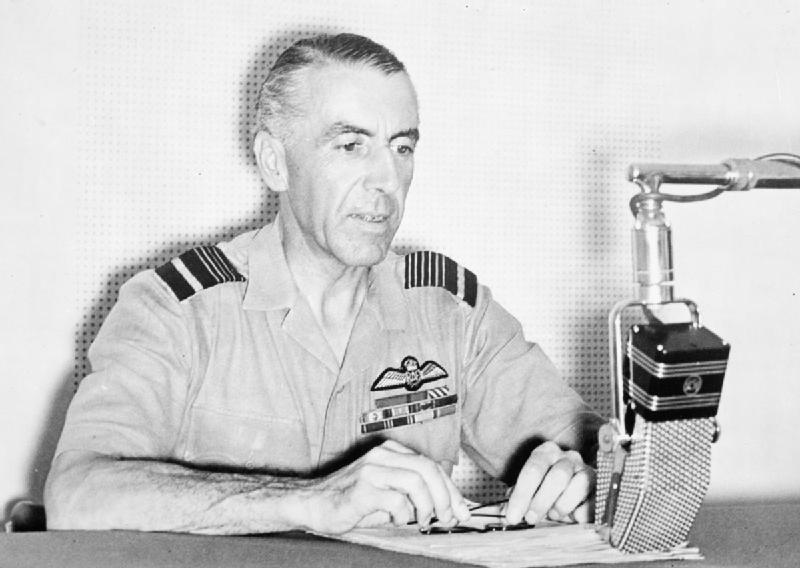
- Peirse broadcasting over the radio during the Second World War
- Born: 30 September 1892; Norwood, South London, England
- Died: 5 August 1970 (aged 77)
- Relatives: Admiral Sir Richard Peirse (father); Air Vice Marshal Sir Richard Peirse (son)
- Military career
- Allegiance: United Kingdom
- Branch: Royal Navy (1912–1918); Royal Air Force (1918–1945)
- Service years: 1912–1945
- Rank: Air Chief Marshal
- Commands: Air Command South-East Asia (1943–1944); Air Forces in India (1942–1943); Bomber Command (1940–1942); Palestine Transjordan Command (1933–1936); RAF Heliopolis (1929–1930); RAF Gosport (1923–1925); No. 222 Squadron RAF (1918–1919); No. 65 Wing RAF (1918); No. 2 Wing RNAS (1917–1918)
- Conflicts: First World War; Arab revolt in Palestine; Second World War
- Awards: Knight Commander of the Order of the Bath; Distinguished Service Order; Air Force Cross; Mentioned in Despatches (3)

Air Chief Marshal Sir Richard Edmund Charles Peirse, KCB, DSO, AFC (30 September 1892 – 5 August 1970) served as a senior Royal Air Force commander.

== RAF career ==
The son of Admiral Sir Richard Peirse and his wife Blanche Melville Wemyss-Whittaker, Richard Peirse was educated at the Junior School section of Monkton Combe School, Bath, Somerset, on HMS Conway and at King's College London. He became a midshipman in the Royal Navy Volunteer Reserve and was commissioned in 1912. He was awarded the Distinguished Service Order for his contribution to the aerial attack on Dunkirk on 23 January 1915. and was promoted to flight commander in May 1915. He was further promoted in July 1916 to squadron commander.

Later that year, on 18 August 1915, Peirse married Mary Joyce Ledgard (1894–1975), younger daughter of Mr and Mrs Armitage Ledgard, of the Manor House, Thorner, Yorkshire. They had one son and one daughter. The marriage was dissolved in 1945.

Peirse served as a pilot with the Royal Naval Air Service until 1 April 1918 when it became part of the Royal Air Force. With the formation of the RAF, Peirse became Officer Commanding No. 222 Squadron. Following promotion to wing commander in January 1922, in 1923 he became Station Commander at RAF Gosport and in 1929 he was made Station Commander at RAF Heliopolis. He was also promoted to group captain in 1929.

Peirse went on to be deputy director of Operations and Intelligence at the Air Ministry in 1930 and, having been promoted to air commodore in 1933, was appointed Air Officer Commanding Palestine Transjordan Command during the Arab revolt in Palestine. Promoted again, this time to air vice-marshal in 1936, he was appointed Deputy Chief of the Air Staff and Director of Operations and Intelligence in January 1937.

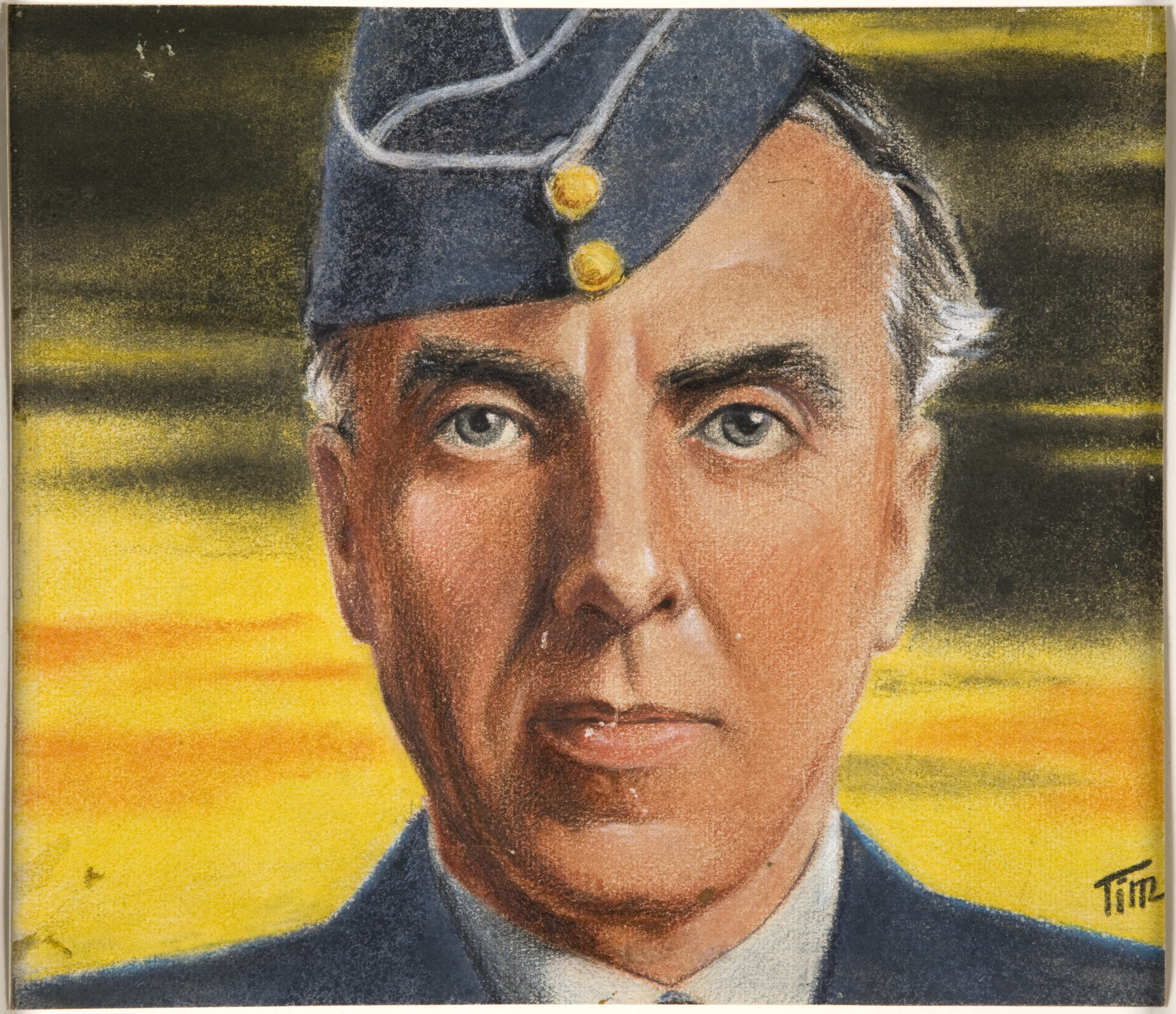
Portrait of Peirse commissioned by the Ministry of Information circa 1943

In the Second World War, as a temporary air marshal, Peirse became Vice-Chief of the Air Staff from April 1940 and, and having had his rank confirmed as permanent in July, he became Air Officer Commanding-in-Chief Bomber Command from October. He presided over a large expansion in the bomber force (and appeared in the propaganda film Target for Tonight). In the face of increasing losses and no evidence of significant impact on Germany, he was relieved of his duties as commander of the bomber force in January 1942. He was replaced by Arthur Harris.

When reports from Witold Pilecki of the treatment of Jews in Auschwitz reached London via the Polish government in exile, Peirse, then head of Bomber Command, was intrigued by their suggestion that the camp be bombed to allow the inmates to escape, even though the 1,700-mile round trip from Stradishall air base in Suffolk to Auschwitz was longer than any mission the RAF had yet attempted. Charles Portal, chief of the air staff, however, rejected the idea as an "undesirable diversion and unlikely to achieve its purpose". During early 1942, Peirse was appointed commander of Allied air forces in South East Asia and the South West Pacific, a post known as ABDAIR and part of the short-lived American-British-Dutch-Australian Command (ABDA). As the Dutch East Indies fell to Japanese forces, during February and March, ABDA was dissolved.

In March 1943 Peirse was appointed Air Officer Commanding-in-Chief RAF India and in November 1943 he was made Allied Air Commander in Chief, South-East Asia. He oversaw the building of his command from a small demoralised and poorly organised force with a collection of obsolescent aircraft into a powerful force with a three to one numerical superiority over the enemy. Although seen as somewhat aloof, he fought fiercely to bring the structure and resources needed for his command and was seen to make an able contribution to the higher direction of the war in the South East Asian theatre.

After a six-month extension, Peirse's term of office expired in November 1944 and was not renewed. He retired in May 1945 with the rank of air chief marshal but never received advancement to the Grand Cross level in the orders of knighthood which would normally have been forthcoming to an officer of his rank at the time. The reason for the abrupt termination of his career lay in his affair with Lady (Jessie) Auchinleck, the wife of his friend, Field Marshal Sir Claude Auchinleck, the Commander in Chief India.

The affair became known to Mountbatten in early 1944, and he passed the information to the Chief of the RAF, Sir Charles Portal, hoping that Peirse would be recalled. The affair was common knowledge by September 1944 and Peirse was considered to be neglecting his duties. Mountbatten sent Peirse and Lady Auchinleck back to England on 28 November 1944, where they lived together at a Brighton hotel. Peirse had his marriage dissolved in 1945, and the Auchinlecks divorced in December 1945. Peirse and the former Lady Auchinleck married the following year.

== Awards and decorations ==
- Distinguished Service Order – 10 April 1915
- Air Force Cross – 1 January 1919.
- Croce di Guerra by the King of Italy for services rendered in the Mediterranean area – 1 April 1919
- Companion of the Order of the Bath – 6 November 1936
- Knight Commander of the Order of the Bath – 11 July 1940
- Order of Polonia Restituta, 2nd Class (Poland) – 29 May 1942
- Grand Cross of the Order of Orange-Nassau (Netherlands) – 12 Jan 1943.
- Commander of the Legion of Merit (USA) – 15 March 1946
- Cloud and Banner Decoration (Third Grade) (China) – 29 July 1947
- Mentioned in Despatches (3) – 17 February 1915, 3 June 1918 and 3 December 1942.

== Notes ==
Military offices
Preceded by Christopher Courtney	Deputy Chief of the Air Staff and Director of Operations and Intelligence; 25 January 1937 – 22 April 1940	Succeeded by Sholto Douglas
New title Post created	Vice-Chief of the Air Staff; 22 April 1940 – 4 October 1940	Succeeded by Sir Wilfrid Freeman
Preceded by Sir Charles Portal	Commander-in-Chief Bomber Command; 1940–1942	Succeeded by Jack Baldwin
Preceded by Sir Patrick Playfair	Commander-in-Chief, Air Forces in India; 1942–1943	Succeeded by Sir Guy Garrod
New command	Commander-in-Chief Air Command South-East Asia; 16 November 1943 – 27 November 1944	Succeeded by Sir Guy Garrod; Temporary appointment
