= Patrick Playfair =

Royal Air Force Air Marshal (1889-1974)

Sir Patrick Playfair
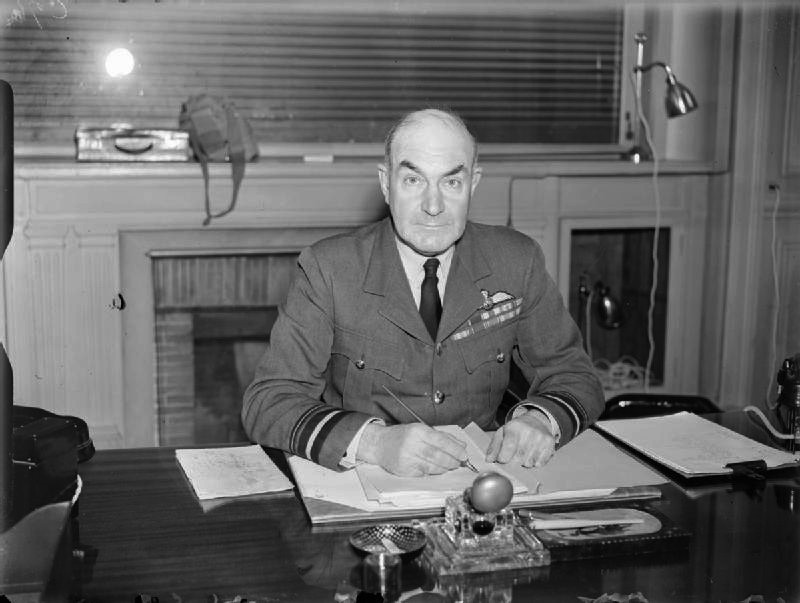
- Air Vice Marshal Patrick Playfair, commander of the Advanced Air Striking Force
- Born: 22 November 1889
- Died: 23 November 1974 (aged 85); Newmarket, Suffolk, England
- Military career
- Allegiance: United Kingdom
- Branch: British Army (1910–1918); Royal Air Force (1918–1942)
- Service years: 1910–1942
- Rank: Air Marshal
- Nickname: Pip
- Commands: Air Forces in India (1940–1942); Advanced Air Striking Force (1939–1940); No. 1 Group RAF (1938–1999); No. 3 Group RAF (1936–1938); Western Area (1933–1936); No. 23 Group RAF (1932–1933); RAF Transjordan and Palestine (1928–1929); RAF Leuchars (1922–1925); No. 1 Flying Training School RAF (1919–1922); Central Flying School (1919); No. 13 Wing RFC (1916–1918); No. 8 Squadron RFC (1916)
- Conflicts: First World War; Second World War
- Awards: Knight Commander of the Order of the British Empire; Companion of the Order of the Bath; Commander of the Royal Victorian Order; Military Cross; Mentioned in Despatches (2); Order of Saint Stanislaus, 3rd Class with Swords (Russia); Distinguished Service Medal (United States); Knight of the Legion of Honour (France)

Air Marshal Sir Patrick Henry Lyon Playfair, KBE, CB, CVO, MC (22 November 1889 – 23 November 1974) was a commander in the Royal Flying Corps during the First World War and a senior commander in the Royal Air Force until his retirement during the Second World War.

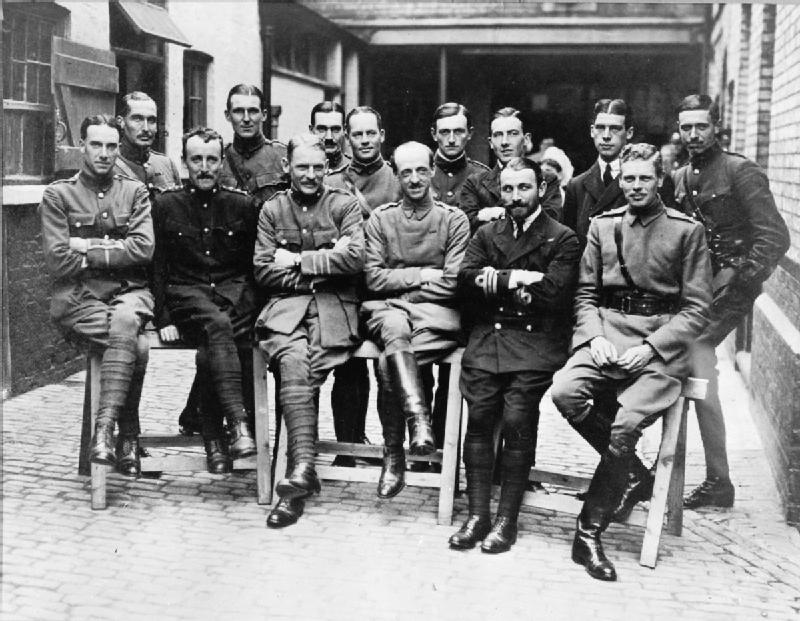
Lieutenant Playfair (back row, 3rd from left) with other officers of the RFC in 1913

In 1945 Playfair published Warfare Today: How Modern Battles Are Planned and Fought on Land, at Sea, and in the Air, co-written by Major General J. F. C. Fuller and Admiral Sir Reginald Bacon.

Military offices
Preceded by Alan Scott	Commandant of the Central Flying School; 1919	Succeeded by Charles Breese
Preceded by Sir John Higgins	Commander-in-Chief, Air Forces in India; 1940–1942	Succeeded by Sir Richard Peirse
