= John Miles Steel =

Royal Air Force Air Chief Marshal (1877–1965)

Air Chief Marshal Sir John Miles Steel GCB KBE CMG
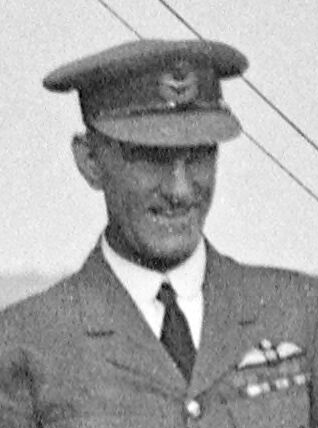
- John Steel in September 1928.
- Born: 11 September 1877
- Died: 2 December 1965 (aged 88)
- Military career
- Allegiance: United Kingdom
- Branch: Royal Navy (c. 1897–1918); Royal Air Force (1918–45)
- Service years: 1897–1937; 1939–45
- Rank: Air Chief Marshal
- Commands: Reserve Command (1939–40); Bomber Command (1936–37); Air Defence of Great Britain (1935–36); RAF India (1931–35); Wessex Bombing Area (1926–30); No. 8 Group (1918); No. 58 Wing (1918); RNAS Eastchurch (1917–18)
- Conflicts: Second Boer War; First World War; Second World War
- Awards: Knight Grand Cross of the Order of the Bath; Knight Commander of the Order of the British Empire; Companion of the Order of St Michael and St George; Mentioned in Despatches (2); Order of Saint Stanislaus, 2nd Class with Swords (Russia)

Air Chief Marshal Sir John Miles Steel, GCB, KBE, CMG (11 September 1877 – 2 December 1965) was a senior Royal Air Force commander.

== Military career ==
Steel attended the training ship Britannia from 1892 to 1894. and subsequently served in the Royal Navy. He was promoted to sub-lieutenant in 1897 and served in the Second Boer War as a member of the Naval Brigade. He was promoted to lieutenant in 1900, and was posted temporary in July 1902 to HMS St George, serving in the Channel Squadron. A permanent posting followed in September that year, when he was posted to HMS Royal Sovereign, coast guard ship at Portsmouth. Promotion to commander followed in 1912, and to captain in 1916.

In 1917 Steel was transferred from fleet duties to the Royal Naval Air Service and was appointed Officer Commanding RNAS Eastchurch. In early 1918 Steel was appointed Officer Commanding No. 58 Wing which was based at Eastchurch and in March, at the age of 40, Steel learned to fly. Meanwhile, he became General Officer Commanding No. 8 Group. On 1 April 1918 the Royal Naval Air Service merged with the Royal Flying Corps to form the Royal Air Force. Steel, like other RNAS personnel transferred to the RAF and was promoted to the temporary rank of brigadier general. Promoted to group captain and then air commodore in 1919 he was appointed Deputy Chief of the Air Staff and Director of Operations and Intelligence and, following his promotion to air vice marshal in 1925, he was made Air Officer Commanding the Wessex Bombing Area and then Air Officer Commanding RAF India. He was promoted to air marshal in 1932 and appointed Air Officer Commanding-in-Chief, Air Defence of Great Britain in August 1935. When Bomber Command was created from the Air Defence of Great Britain command in July 1936, Steel became its first Air Officer Commanding-in-Chief in the rank of air chief marshal.

== Second World War ==
In August 1939 Steel came back from retirement to serve as Air Officer Commanding Reserve Command. In April 1940 he was succeeded as AOC by William Welsh and Steel returned to retirement. The following year in April once again returned to active service, this time as the Controller-General of Economy at the Air Ministry. He retired for the last time on 26 September 1945.

== Family life ==
In 1909, Steel married Laura Kathleen Sinclair-Thomson. The marriage took place on 29 July 1909 at St Andrew's, Wells Street, London. According to Who’s Who, Laura Kathleen was a daughter of Dr William Sinclair-Thomson and Jessie Methven, daughter of George Addison Cox. The couple had three sons and one daughter. Their daughter, Helen Marjorie Steel, married Niale Shane Trevor Benson in 1939.

Military offices
Preceded by Robert Groves	Deputy Chief of the Air Staff and Director of Operations and Intelligence; 8 September 1919 – 12 April 1926	Succeeded by Cyril Newall
Preceded by Geoffrey Salmond	Air Officer Commanding RAF India; 1931–1935	Succeeded by Sir Edgar Ludlow-Hewitt
Preceded by Sir Robert Brooke-Popham	Air Officer Commanding-in-Chief Air Defence of Great Britain; 1935–1936	Succeeded by None
Preceded by New Creation	Air Officer Commanding-in-Chief Bomber Command; 1936–1937	Succeeded by Sir Edgar Ludlow-Hewitt
Preceded by Sir Christopher Courtney	Air Officer Commanding-in-Chief Reserve Command; 1939–1940	Succeeded by Sir William Welsh
