= Rumilly-en-Cambrésis =

- Commune
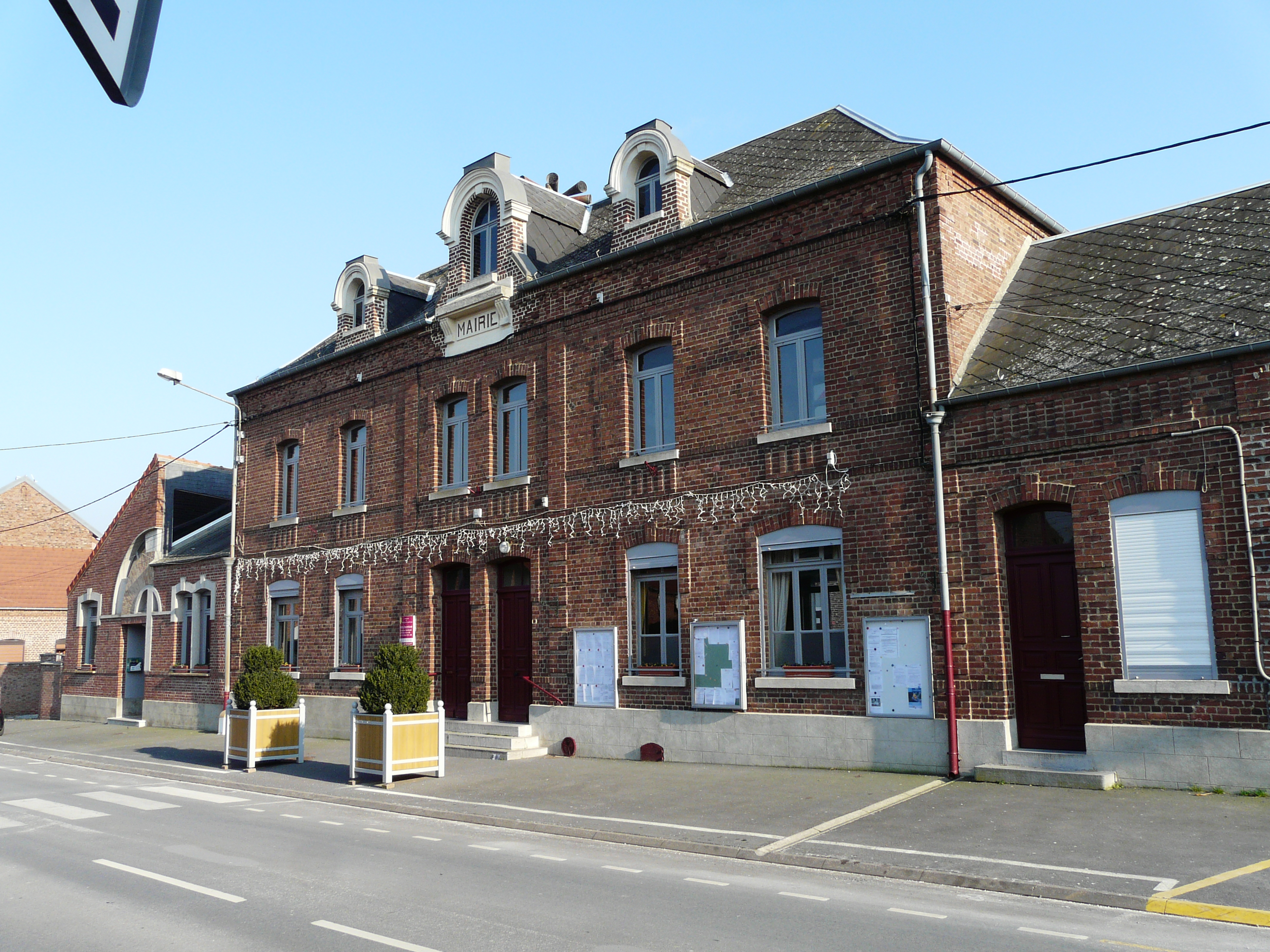
- The town hall in Rumilly-en-Cambrésis

- Coat of arms
- Location of Rumilly-en-Cambrésis
- Location within France Location within Hauts-de-France
- Coordinates: 50°07′39″N 3°13′15″E
- Country: France
- Region: Hauts-de-France
- Department: Nord
- Arrondissement: Cambrai
- Canton: Le Cateau-Cambrésis
- Intercommunality: CA Cambrai

Government
  - Mayor (2020–2026): Jean Fichaux
- Area^{1}: 6.76 km^{2} (2.61 sq mi)
- Elevation: 68 m (223 ft)
- Highest elevation: 106 m (348 ft)
- Lowest elevation: 64 m (210 ft)
- Population (2023): 1,431
  - Density: 212/km^{2} (548/sq mi)
- Time zone: UTC+01:00 (CET)
  - Summer (DST): UTC+02:00 (CEST)
- INSEE/Postal code: 59520 /59281
- ^{1} French Land Register data, which excludes lakes, ponds, glaciers > 1 km^{2} (0.386 sq mi or 247 acres) and river estuaries.

Rumilly-en-Cambrésis is a commune in the Nord department in northern France.

== Heraldry ==
Arms of Rumilly-en-Cambrésis	The arms of Rumilly-en-Cambrésis are blazoned : Or, 3 crescents gules. (Anneux, Crèvecœur-sur-l'Escaut, Rumilly-en-Cambrésis, Saint-Souplet and Wargnies-le-Petit use the same arms.)

== See also ==
- Communes of the Nord department
