= Saint-Souplet =

- Commune
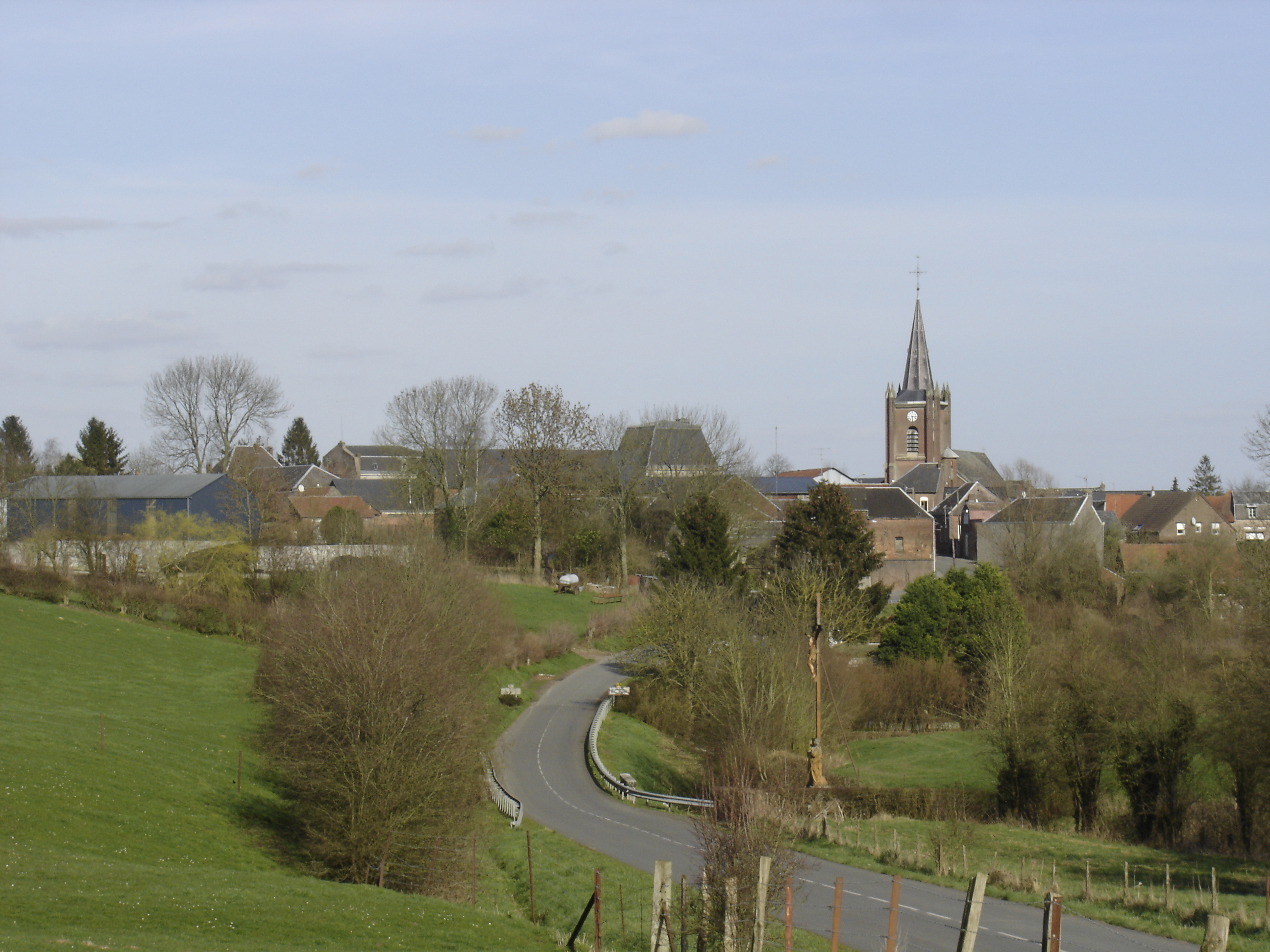
- A general view of Saint-Souplet

- Coat of arms
- Location of Saint-Souplet
- Location within France Location within Hauts-de-France
- Coordinates: 50°03′19″N 3°31′53″E
- Country: France
- Region: Hauts-de-France
- Department: Nord
- Arrondissement: Cambrai
- Canton: Le Cateau-Cambrésis
- Intercommunality: CA Caudrésis–Catésis

Government
  - Mayor (2020–2026): Henri Quoniou
- Area^{1}: 12.66 km^{2} (4.89 sq mi)
- Highest elevation: 161 m (528 ft)
- Lowest elevation: 101 m (331 ft)
- Population (2023): 1,191
  - Density: 94.08/km^{2} (243.7/sq mi)
- Time zone: UTC+01:00 (CET)
  - Summer (DST): UTC+02:00 (CEST)
- INSEE/Postal code: 59545 /59360
- ^{1} French Land Register data, which excludes lakes, ponds, glaciers > 1 km^{2} (0.386 sq mi or 247 acres) and river estuaries.

Saint-Souplet (French pronunciation: [sɛ̃ suplɛ]) is a commune in the Nord department in northern France.

== Geography ==
Saint Souplet-Escaufourt is on the (departmental) route 115. It is part of the Canton of Le Cateau-Cambrésis, 6 km from Cateau, 30 km south east of Cambrai and 86 km from Lille.

Located in the south of Cateau-Cambrésis and on the doorstep of Avesnois, Saint-Souplet is surrounded by the nature landscapes of Hainaut : grasslands bordered by 'bocage' hedges and vast expanses of cultivated fields. It extends along the Selle, a tributary river of the Scheldt, which arises in Aisne and winds some 50 kilomètres through Nord.

== History ==
Saint-Souplet owes its name to its patron saint, Sulpitius the Pious, archbishop of Bourges in the 7th century. In 1973, it absorbed Escaufourt, located previously in Aisne.

=== Heraldry ===
| Arms of Saint-Souplet | The arms of Saint-Souplet are blazoned : D'or à trois croissants de gueules. These arms are those of D'Anneux, marquis of Wargnies and lords of Saint-Souplet. |

== Demography ==
Historical population
| Year | Pop. | ±% p.a. |
|---|---|---|
| 1968 | 1,684 | — |
| 1975 | 1,622 | −0.53% |
| 1982 | 1,482 | −1.28% |
| 1990 | 1,333 | −1.32% |
| 1999 | 1,311 | −0.18% |
| 2007 | 1,284 | −0.26% |
| 2012 | 1,292 | +0.12% |
| 2017 | 1,230 | −0.98% |
| 2023 | 1,191 | −0.54% |
Source: INSEE

== Escaufourt ==
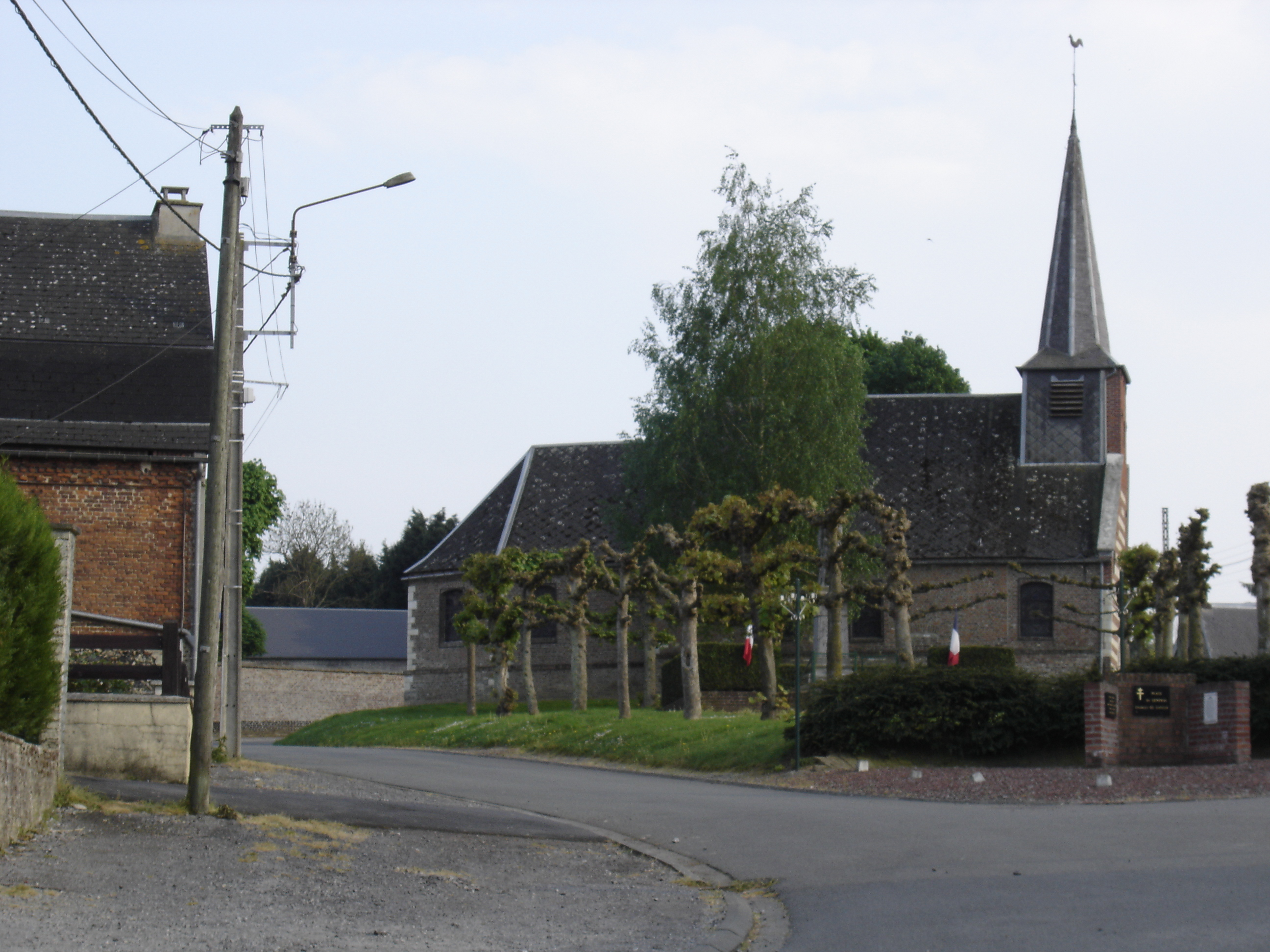
Center of Escaufourt

The name Escaufourt comes from fours à chaux (chalk oven). in the 12th century, Escaufourt was in the parish of Honnechy. Before the merger with Saint-Souplet in 1973, Escaufourt was an enclave of Aisne within Nord.

=== Heraldry ===
| Arms of Escaufourt | The arms of Escaufourt are blazoned : Gules, 3 chevrons, in chief a label of 4 points Or. |

== See also ==
- Communes of the Nord department
