= John Paynter (RAF officer) =

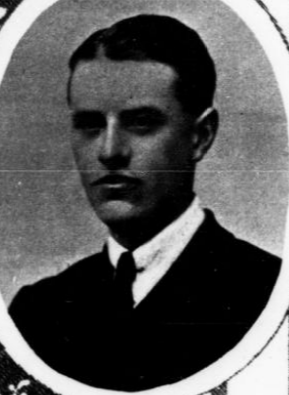
- Born: 17 May 1898; Southsea, Hampshire, England
- Died: 6 June 1918 (aged 20) (DOW); Bergues, France
- Burial place: Dunkirk Town Cemetery, France; 51°01′45″N 2°23′18″E
- Military career
- Allegiance: United Kingdom
- Branch: Royal Navy; Royal Air Force
- Service years: 1916–1918
- Rank: Captain
- Units: No. 6 Naval Squadron RNAS; No. 10 Naval Squadron RNAS; No. 9 Naval Squadron RNAS; No. 13 Naval Squadron/No. 213 Squadron RAF
- Conflicts: First World War
- Awards: Distinguished Service Cross

John De Camborne Paynter, DSC (17 May 1898 – 6 June 1918) was a British flying ace of the First World War, credited with 10 aerial victories while flying with the Royal Naval Air Service. He was awarded the Distinguished Service Cross for his valour before being killed in a bombing raid.

== Early life ==
Paynter was born in Southsea, Hampshire, on 17 May 1898. His mother was Alexandra Laura Paynter.

== First World War ==
Paynter joined the Royal Naval Air Service (RNAS) in early 1916 as a probationary temporary flight sub-lieutenant, and was confirmed in his rank on 25 June 1916. He served in both No. 6 and No. 10 Naval Squadrons, before being injured in a flying accident on 9 April 1917. After his recovery, he flew with No. 9 Naval Squadron; it was while flying with them that he scored his first aerial victory on 27 October 1917. He then transferred to No. 13 Naval Squadron; he would remain with them through their transition to No. 213 Squadron RAF. On 5 December 1917, he scored a win with them.

On 1 January 1918, Paynter was promoted to flight lieutenant. He also scored three wins in the early months of 1918. After a break, he scored the remainder of his victories in May and early June 1918. While doing this, he was wounded in action on two occasions.

Paynter died on 6 June 1918 from wounds suffered during a German bombing raid on his squadron's aerodrome at Bergues, France. He is buried in Plot IV. A. 78 in Dunkirk Town Cemetery, France. He is also memorialised at Saint Peter's Church, Somerstown, Portsmouth, on a plaque located under the organ loft.

== Distinguished Service Cross ==
As his award citation shows, Paynter performed admirably in air-to-ground combat as well as in the air:

For the good work performed by him during a bombing attack on Ostende Seaplane Base on the 3rd March, 1918, carried out in spite of very adverse weather conditions. He has shown great zeal and courage as a fighting pilot, having destroyed several enemy machines, and been twice wounded in aerial combats.

== List of aerial victories ==
Combat record
No.	Date/time	Aircraft	Foe	Result	Location	Notes
No. 9 Naval Squadron RNAS
1	27 October 1917; 10:40	Sopwith Camel (B3830)	Albatros D.V fighter	Driven down out of control	Slijpe, Belgium	Shared with Captain Stearne T. Edwards, Flight Commander Harold Stackard, Flight Lieutenant Fred E. Banbury, and Flight Sub-Lieutenants Francis Mellersh, John P. Hales, C. A. Narbeth, Arthur W. Wood, & Merrill S. Taylor.
No. 13 Naval Squadron RNAS
2	5 December 1917; 15:05	Sopwith Camel (B6391)	Albatros reconnaissance aircraft	Destroyed	4 miles northwest of Wenduine	Shared with Flight Sub-Lieutenants John W. Pinder, George C. MacKay, & Maurice L. Cooper
3	29 January 1918; 14:00	Sopwith Camel (B3782)	Seaplane	Destroyed	100 yards from the pier at Blankenberge, Belgium	Shared with Flight Commander Leonard H. Slatter, and Flight Sub-Lieutenants John E. Greene, George C. MacKay, & Maurice L. Cooper
4	30 January 1918; 14:20	Sopwith Camel (B3782)	Albatros reconnaissance aircraft	Destroyed	2 miles north of Ostend	Shared with Flight Commander Miles Day
5	19 February 1918; 13:55	Sopwith Camel (B3782)	Seaplane	Destroyed by fire	East of Ostend	Shared with Flight Commander Miles Day, and Flight Sub-Lieutenants J. C. Stovin, E. V. Bell, & G. D. Smith
No. 213 Squadron RAF
6	6 May 1918; 19:50	Sopwith Camel (B7254)	Albatros D.V fighter	Destroyed	Wenduine, Belgium	
7	8 May 1918; 19:50	Sopwith Camel (B7254)	Albatros D.V fighter	Destroyed	Wenduine, Belgium	
8	8 May 1918; 19:50	Sopwith Camel (B7254)	Albatros D.V fighter	Driven down out of control	Wenduine, Belgium	
9	1 June 1918; 14:20	Sopwith Camel (B7254)	Pfalz D.III fighter	Driven down out of control	Bruges, Belgium	Shared with Lieutenants G. D. Smith, C. H. Denny, F. L. Cuttle & P. L. Jenner
10	1 June 1918; 14:20	Sopwith Camel (B7254)	Pfalz D.III fighter	Driven down out of control	Bruges, Belgium	Shared with Lieutenant G. D. Smith

== See also ==
- Aerial victory standards of World War I
- List of World War I aces credited with 10 victories
