= John Pinder (RAF officer) =

British First World War flying ace

John William Pinder
- Born: 14 February 1898; Deal, Kent, England
- Died: 16 August 1920 (aged 22); Icara, Brazil
- Military career
- Allegiance: England
- Branch: Aviation
- Service years: 1916–1919
- Rank: Captain
- Units: No. 9 Naval Squadron RNAS, No. 213 Squadron RAF, No. 45 Squadron RAF
- Awards: Distinguished Flying Cross with Bar, Mentioned in Despatches

Captain John William Pinder DFC (14 February 1898 – 16 August 1920) was a British First World War flying ace, who flew for the Royal Navy Air Service, and later the Royal Air Force.

== Early life ==
John William Pinder was born on 14 February 1898 in Deal, Kent, England.

== World War I service ==
Pinder joined military service for World War I when old enough. On 22 October 1916, he was appointed as a probationary flight officer in the Royal Naval Air Service and posted to its headquarters on HMS President. On 3 January 1917 he was riding in the rear seat of Curtiss JN4 serial number 8820 when it crashlanded at Redcar, tearing off the undercarriage and damaging the propeller.

After completion of training as a pilot, he was posted to No. 9 Squadron RNAS. During the unit's operations along the Belgian coast, he scored his first three aerial victories. He was subsequently appointed a flight commander and transferred to No. 13 Squadron RNAS. By 5 December 1917, his score had risen to six, and he was awarded the Distinguished Flying Cross.

On 17 January 1918, he was reported accidentally injured in Flight newsletter, though the date of injury was not reported. By the end of April 1918, he had amassed 166 combat flight hours. By this time, No. 13 Squadron RNAS had been incorporated into the nascent Royal Air Force. This incorporation may account for the fact that on 13 May 1918, Lieutenant Pinder was appointed as a temporary captain while employed as such, as flight commanders in the RAF were ranked as captains.

Pinder's Distinguished Flying Cross was finally gazetted on 3 June 1918. By the time Pinder left 213 Squadron at the end of August 1918 for an Air Ministry post with the Grand Fleet, his aerial victory score stood at 12. He would not remain at his new posting for long, as he joined No. 45 Squadron RAF of the Independent Air Force in October. He would score five more victories while serving in this squadron, bringing his total to 17.

== List of aerial victories ==
See also Aerial victory standards of World War I

| No. | Date/time | Aircraft | Foe | Result | Location | Notes |
|---|---|---|---|---|---|---|
| 1 | 5 June 1917 @ 1930 hours | Sopwith Triplane serial number N5462 | Albatros D.III | Driven down out of control | Ostend, Belgium | |
| 2 | 7 July 1917 @ 1730 hours | Sopwith Triplane s/n N6475 | Albatros D.III | Driven down out of control | Southwest of Haynecourt, France | Victory shared with Arthur Whealy, three other RNAS pilots |
| 3 | 25 July 1917 @ 1730 hours | Sopwith Camel s/n B3870 | German two-seater | Driven down out of control | Into the English Channel off Westende, Belgium | Victory shared with Oliver Redgate, Fred Everest Banbury, two other RNAS pilots |
| 4 | 17 October 1917 @ 0730 hours | Sopwith Camel s/n N6439 | German seaplane | Destroyed | 3 miles north of Zeebrugge, Belgium | |
| 5 | 4 December 1917 @ 1535 hours | Sopwith Camel s/n N6335 | Aviatik two-seater | Driven down out of control | Between Houthulst and Zarren, Belgium | Victory shared with George Chisholm MacKay |
| 6 | 5 December 1917 @ 1505 hours | Sopwith Camel s/n N6357 | Albatros two-seater | Destroyed | Over the English Channel 4 miles northwest of Wenduine, Belgium | Victory shared with John Paynter, Maurice Cooper, another RNAS pilot |
| 7 | 19 May 1918 @ 1735 hours | Sopwith Camel s/n C65 | Albatros D.V | Set afire in midair; destroyed | 1 mile south of Woumen, Belgium | Victory shared with John Paynter, Maurice Cooper, another RNAS pilot |
| 8 | 2 June 1918 @ 1935 hours | Sopwith Camel s/n C65 | Pfalz D.III | Driven down out of control | Moorslede, Belgium | Victory shared with William Gray |
| 9 | 7 June 1918 @ 1805 hours | Sopwith Camel s/n C65 | Albatros D.V | Driven down out of control | 4 miles south of Diksmuide, Belgium | |
| 10 | 15 June 1918 @ 1745 hours | Sopwith Camel s/n C65 | Hannover two-seater | Driven down out of control | Poperinghe, Belgium | Victory shared with two other pilots |
| 11 | 27 June 1918 @ 1020 hours | Sopwith Camel s/n C65 | Fokker D.VII | Set afire in midair; destroyed | Over the English Channel offshore of Blankenberge, Belgium | |
| 12 | 30 July 1918 @ 1205 hours | Sopwith Camel s/n D8216 | Albatros D.V | Driven down out of control | 3 miles southwest of Ostend, Belgium | |
| 13 | 19 October 1918 @ 1500 hours | Sopwith Camel s/n D8240 | Rumpler two-seater | Driven down out of control | Xaffévillers, France | |
| 14 | 23 October 1918 @ 1220 hours | Sopwith Camel s/n E7244 | Rumpler two-seater | Driven down out of control | South of Saint-Dié-des-Vosges, France | |
| 15 | 23 October 1918 @ 1240 hours | Sopwith Camel s/n E7244 | Rumpler two-seater | Captured | Fruize | |
| 16 | 28 October 1918 @ 1050 hours | Sopwith Camel s/n E7244 | Rumpler two-seater | Captured | Corcieux, France | |
| 17 | 5 November 1918 @ 1550 hours | Sopwith Camel s/n E7244 | Rumpler two-seater | Destroyed | North of Parroy, France | |

== Post World War I ==
After war's end, Pinder received some belated honours; on 3 June 1919 he was both Mentioned in Despatches and received a Bar in lieu of a second award of the Distinguished Flying Cross. On 17 June 1919, he was elected to Royal Aero Club membership.

He was granted a short service commission as a Flying Officer in the RAF on 24 October 1919, though this appointment was later cancelled. On 6 December 1919, he transferred to the unemployed list of the RAF.

After the war, Pinder was an aviation pioneer in South America. In August 1920, he was part of a group attempting the first flight between Brazil and Buenos Aires. Pinder teamed with Brazilian Lieutenant Aliatar Martins to make this flight in a Macchi M.9 flying boat. The aircraft disappeared. The bodies of Pinder and Martins were found on 27 August. Loss of a propeller had apparently crashed their aircraft.

Other accounts give more detail. They state that Pinder and Martins landed in the Lagoa dos Esteves, Içara to repair a propeller. After it was fixed, they tried to restart the airplane's engine. In the process, Martins was knocked into the lagoon by the propeller, and his arm was broken. Pinder dived in to save him, but both men drowned. After the drownings, a search party found the seaplane in the lagoon and threatened to kill all the local men in the vicinity because there was suspicion of foul play. There was a general exodus of these men into the woods to hide from suspicion. One courageous local man aided the ten-day search. Pinder and Martins were originally buried in the first graves of the local cemetery, but were removed several years later.
