= Maurice Cooper =

Irish World War I flying ace

Maurice Lea Cooper
- Born: 18 December 1898; Dublin, Ireland
- Died: 2 October 1918 (aged 19); Northeast of Gitsberg, Belgium
- Burial place: Dadizeele New British Cemetery, Moorslede, West Flanders, Belgium; 50°50′55.4″N 3°05′15.7″E
- Military career
- Allegiance: United Kingdom
- Branch: Royal Navy; Royal Air Force
- Service years: 1917–1918
- Rank: Captain
- Unit: No. 13 Squadron RNAS/No. 213 Squadron RAF
- Awards: Distinguished Flying Cross

Captain Maurice Lea Cooper DFC (18 December 1898 – 2 October 1918) was an Irish World War I flying ace credited with six aerial victories.

== Early life and background ==
Cooper was born in Dublin, Ireland, the only son of John Hall Cooper, an Irish Presbyterian, and Gertrude Lea Cooper, an English Quaker. He had two sisters; Norah Lea and Joyce. He was educated in Dublin, and later at Bootham School, York, England.

== World War I ==
Cooper joined the Royal Naval Air Service on 29 April 1917, received Royal Aero Club Aviator's Certificate No. 5024 on 16 July, and was commissioned as a flight sub-lieutenant on 29 July.

He was posted to No. 13 (Naval) Squadron to fly the Sopwith Camel single seat fighter. He destroyed an enemy two-seater on 5 December 1917, aided by fellow aces John Pinder, George Chisholm MacKay, and John Paynter. On 29 January 1918, aided by MacKay, Paynter, John Edmund Greene, and Leonard Slatter, he destroyed a seaplane. On 12 March 1918, Cooper shared another victory with Greene, MacKay, and another pilot. On 1 April, Cooper flamed a German two-seater seaplane at Zeebrugge, killing M. R. Behrendt and D. R. Hauptvogel. On 3 June, in the King's Birthday Honours he was awarded the Distinguished Flying Cross, and on 3 July he was appointed a flight commander with the temporary rank of captain. On 7 July, he, Charles Sims, and four other pilots drove down an Albatros D.V. On 30 July 1918, he drove down another D.V at Bruges. That made his tally four enemy aircraft destroyed, three of which were shared wins, and two driven down out of control, one of which was shared.

On 2 October 1918, while bombing an enemy troop train, his aircraft was hit by ground fire and he died in the crash near Gitsberg, Belgium. He is buried in Dadizeele New British Cemetery, Moorslede, West Flanders. He is remembered on his mother's tombstone in Mount Jerome Cemetery and Crematorium.

== List of aerial victories ==
Combat record
No.	Date/Time	Aircraft/ Serial No.	Opponent	Result	Location	Notes
No. 13 (Naval) Squadron RNAS
1	5 December 1917 @ 1505	Sopwith Camel (B6407)	C	Destroyed	4 miles (6.4 km) north-west of Wenduine	Shared with Flight Sub-Lieutenants John Pinder, George MacKay & John Paynter.
2	29 January 1918 @ 1400	Sopwith Camel (B6410)	Seaplane	Destroyed	100 yards (91 m) from Blankenberge Pier	Shared with Flight Commander Leonard Slatter, and Flight Sub-Lieutenants John Paynter, John Greene & George MacKay.
3	12 March 1918 @ 0900	Sopwith Camel (B6410)	C	Destroyed in flames	Ostend–Wenduine	Shared with Flight Sub-Lieutenants John Greene, George MacKay & E. V. Bell.
No. 213 Squadron RAF
4	1 April 1918 @ abt 1430	Sopwith Camel (B6416)	Seaplane C	Destroyed in flames	Zeebrugge	
5	7 July 1918 @ 1140	Sopwith Camel (B3326)	Albatros D.V	Out of control	Middelkerke	Shared with Lieutenants G. D. Smith, Jenner, Allott, Rankin & Charles Sims.
6	30 July 1918 @ 1150	Sopwith Camel (D3326)	Albatros D.V	Out of control	Bruges	
