= Fred Everest Banbury =

Canadian flying ace

- Born: 27 October 1893; Wolseley, Saskatchewan, Canada
- Died: 1 April 1918 (aged 24); Denain, France
- Burial place: Hazebrouck Communal Cemetery, Nord, France
- Military career
- Allegiance: United Kingdom
- Branch: Royal Navy; Royal Air Force
- Service years: 1916–1918
- Rank: Captain
- Unit: No. 9 (Naval) Squadron RNAS/No. 209 Squadron RAF
- Conflicts: World War I; Western Front
- Awards: Distinguished Service Cross

Fred Everest Banbury, DSC (27 October 1893 – 1 April 1918) was a Canadian flying ace of the First World War, officially credited with eleven aerial victories while serving in the British Royal Naval Air Service.

== Early life and education ==
Banbury was born in Wolseley, Saskatchewan, the only son of Robert Samuel Banbury and Susannah Beatrice (née March). He was educated at schools in Wolseley and Regina before attending Victoria College in 1911–12 and University College in 1912–14. After graduating he attended Regina Normal School, and also worked as a teacher at Bredenbury, before becoming a law student at Regina. Banbury travelled to the United States to enrol at the Curtiss Flying School at Newport News, Virginia, in March 1916, qualifying with the highest marks ever gained at the school, and was awarded Aero Club of America pilot's license No. 507 on 5 June after soloing a Curtiss biplane.

== Military service ==
Banbury then travelled to England to join the Royal Naval Air Service, being commissioned as a temporary flight sub-lieutenant on probation on 28 June 1916. After additional training he was eventually posted to France in March 1917 to serve in No. 9 (Naval) Squadron based at St. Pol. Flying a Sopwith Pup single-seat fighter Banbury gained his first aerial victory on 31 May 1917, sharing in the driving down out of control of a German two-seater reconnaissance aircraft over Ostend. The following day he drove down a Halberstadt reconnaissance aircraft solo. His squadron were then re-equipped with the Sopwith Camel fighter, and in one of these Banbury shared in the driving down of another reconnaissance aircraft off Westende on 25 July. Banbury gained three more aerial victories in September, accounting for an Albatros reconnaissance aircraft and two Albatros D.V fighters. On 1 October 1917 he was promoted to flight lieutenant, going on to gain three more victories over enemy aircraft that month. He was granted the acting rank of flight commander on 9 November, and gained his tenth victory on the 23rd.

Banbury returned to Canada on leave in December 1917, before returning to England in February 1918, and then to his unit in France in March. He gained his eleventh and final victory, sharing in the capture of a reconnaissance aircraft near Becelaere, on 26 March.

On 1 April 1918 the Royal Naval Air Service was merged with the Army's Royal Flying Corps to form the Royal Air Force, and Flight Commander Banbury of No. 9 (Naval) Squadron became Captain Banbury of No. 209 Squadron RAF. However, the same day Banbury took off in Camel "B7247" on a practice flight, but suffered a fatal heart attack in flight and crashed.

Banbury's award of the Distinguished Service Cross "in recognition of services at Dunkirk" was gazetted posthumously on 23 April 1918.

Banbury is buried in grave "III.E.5." in Hazebrouck Communal Cemetery, Nord, France. He is also memorialized in Regina, Canada.

=== List of aerial victories ===
Combat record
No.	Date/Time	Aircraft/ Serial No.	Opponent	Result	Location	Notes
1	31 May 1917 @ 1615	Sopwith Pup (N6188)	C	Out of control	Ostend	Shared with Flight Sub-Lieutenants A. Shearer & Harold Stackard.
2	1 June 1917 @ 0915	Sopwith Pup (N6188)	Halberstadt C	Out of control	Westende—Gistel	
3	25 July 1917 @ 1730	Sopwith Camel (B3820)	C	Out of control	Off Westende	Shared with Flight Sub-Lieutenants John Pinder, Oliver Redgate, Harold Mott, & Snell.
4	5 September 1917 @ 0800	Sopwith Camel (B3832)	Albatros C	Out of control	Middelkerke—Nieuport	Shared with Flight Commander Stearne Edwards, and Flight Sub-Lieutenants Roy Brown, Oliver Redgate, & Arthur Wood.
5	13 September 1917 @ c.1430	Sopwith Camel (B3832)	Albatros D.V	Out of control	East of Leke	Shared with Flight Commander Stearne Edwards and Flight Sub-Lieutenants John Hales, Oakley, & Ingleson.
6	28 September 1917 @ 1610	Sopwith Camel (B6230)	Albatros D.V	Destroyed	Diksmuide	Shared with Flight Sub-Lieutenants Oliver Redgate, John Hales, Merrill Taylor, & Cedric Edwards.
7	2 October 1917 @ 1450	Sopwith Camel (B6230)	C	Out of control	Ostend—Slype	Shared with Flight Sub-Lieutenant Oliver Redgate.
8	27 October 1917 @ 1040	Sopwith Camel (B6230)	Albatros D.V	Out of control	Slype	Shared with Flight Commanders Stearne Edwards & Harold Stackard, and Flight Sub-Lieutenants Francis Mellersh, John Hales, John Paynter, C. A. Narbeth, Arthur Wood, & Merrill Taylor.
9	28 October 1917 @ 1230	Sopwith Camel (B6230)	Albatros D.V	Destroyed	Schoore	
10	23 November 1917 @ 1220	Sopwith Camel (B6230)	Albatros D.V	Out of control	South of Diksmuide	Shared with Flight Sub-Lieutenant John Hales.
11	26 March 1918 @ 0725	Sopwith Camel (B7247)	C	Captured	1 mi (1.6 km) South of Becelaere	Shared with Flight Sub-Lieutenants Oliver Redgate, Merrill Taylor, & Squire.
