= Redgate (disambiguation) =

Redgate is a software company based in Cambridge, England.

Redgate may also refer to:

== People ==
- Elizabeth Redgate, British historian
- Jim Redgate, Australian classical guitar luthier
- Oliver Redgate (1898–1929), British World War I flying ace
- Oliver Redgate (cricketer) (1863–1913), English cricketer
- Riley Redgate, American writer
- Roger Redgate (born 1958), British musician and conductor
- Sam Redgate (1810–1851), English cricketer
- Thomas Redgate (1809–1874), English cricketer

== Other uses ==
- MV Redgate, a British cargo ship in service 1953–63
- Redgate, Queensland, Australia
- Redgate, Western Australia, Australia

== See also ==
- Red Gate, a triumphal arch in Moscow
- Red Gate Arts Society in Vancouver
- The Memorial Gate for Virtuous Women (also known as The Red Gate), a 1962 South Korean film
