= William Gray (RAF officer) =

William Edrington Gray
- Born: 11 October 1898; Mordington, Berwickshire, Scotland
- Died: May 1985 (aged 86); Tunbridge Wells, Kent
- Military career
- Allegiance: United Kingdom
- Branch: Royal Navy; Royal Air Force
- Service years: 1917–1919
- Rank: Lieutenant
- Unit: No. 213 Squadron RAF
- Conflicts: World War I
- Awards: Order of the British Empire; Distinguished Flying Cross; Mention in Despatches; Croix de Guerre (France)
- Other work: Aeronautical engineer

Lieutenant William Edrington Gray, OBE, DFC (11 October 1898 – May 1985) was a Scottish World War I flying ace credited with seven aerial victories.

== Biography ==
Gray was the son of Edward and Annabella Gray of Edrington Castle in Mordington, Berwickshire, Scotland. He joined the Royal Naval Air Service on 25 July 1917. By May 1918, when Gray went operational, the RNAS had been incorporated into the Royal Air Force. Gray was assigned to a former naval squadron, No. 213, as a Sopwith Camel pilot.

On 19 May 1918, Gray was patrolling with William Pinder. Vizefeldwebel Triebswetter of Jasta 16 pulled away from burning a Belgian observation balloon when the British pair shot him down. This began a run of victories for Gray that ran almost to war's end. Gray won a Distinguished Flying Cross on 2 November 1918. He also received two belated awards in early 1919, being Mentioned in Despatches and winning the Croix de Guerre.

After the war Gray left the RAF, being transferred to the unemployed list on 22 June 1919, and pursued a career as aeronautical engineer. This was a long-standing interest, as he and his older brother Edward Leadbetter Gray (1897–1918) had built a primitive monoplane in 1910–1911, and a biplane in 1914–1915. On 25 October 1926 he filed a patent for his aircraft undercarriage design at the UK Patent Office, and did the same at the U.S. Office on 14 October 1927, being granted U.S. Patent No. 1,716,439 on 11 June 1929. In 1962 Gray, then Principal Scientific Officer at the Royal Aircraft Establishment was made an Officer of the Order of the British Empire in recognition of his services.

== List of aerial victories ==
No.	Date/time	Aircraft	Foe	Result	Location	Notes
1	19 May 1918 @ 1735 hours	Sopwith Camel serial number B6239	Albatros D.V	Shot down in flames	A mile south of Woumen, Belgium	Kill shared with John Pinder; Vizefeldwebel Triebswetter killed in action
2	2 June 1918 1935 hours	Sopwith Camel s/n D3409	Pfalz D.III	Driven down out of control	Moorslede, Belgium	Victory shared with John Pinder
3	11 August 1918 @ 1940 hours	Sopwith Camel s/n D8189	Albatros two-seater	Destroyed	4 miles southeast of Diksmuide, Belgium	Victory shared with three other pilots
4	21 August 1918 @1915 hours	Sopwith Camel s/n D8189	Fokker D.VII	Destroyed	2 miles northwest of Zeebrugge	German pilot killed by parachute failure
5	23 September 1918 @ 1425 hours	Sopwith Camel s/n D8189	Fokker D.VII	Driven down out of control	East of Diksmuide, Belgium	
6	25 September 1918 @ 1745 hours	Sopwith Camel s/n D8189	Fokker D.VII	Driven down out of control	4 miles west of Thorout, Belgium	
7	1 October 1918	Sopwith Camel s/n D8189	Fokker D.VII	Driven down out of control	Houthulst Forest	

== Honours and awards ==
Distinguished Flying Cross
Lieutenant William Edrington Gray (Sea Patrol).

Since May last this officer has destroyed three enemy machines and has taken part in five low-bombing raids. He is a most efficient officer, possessing great presence of mind, and invariably displaying cool courage in difficult situations. On a recent occasion he led a formation of forty machines to bomb an aerodrome; this was most successfully accomplished, and was largely due to Lieut. Gray's able and skilful leadership.

Mention in Despatches
For "distinguished service in war areas". Gazetted on 1 January 1919.

Croix de Guerre with Palme
Gazetted 7 February 1919.
