= Harold Stackard =

British World War I flying ace (1895–1949)

Harold Francis Stackard
- Born: 2 March 1895; Norwich, Norfolk, England
- Died: 24 November 1949 (aged 54); Fittleworth, West Sussex
- Military career
- Allegiance: United Kingdom
- Branch: Royal Air Force; British Army; Royal Navy
- Service years: 1914–1918
- Rank: Lieutenant
- Units: Royal Naval Division; No. 9 Squadron RNAS; No. 157 Squadron RAF
- Conflicts: First World War

Lieutenant Harold Francis Stackard (2 March 1895 – 24 November 1949) was a First World War British flying ace credited with fifteen aerial victories. In addition to serving as a pilot during the war, he was a Royal Air Force instructor.

== Background ==
Harold Francis Stackard, son of Stephen and Mary Ann Lydia Pipe Stackard, was born on 2 March 1895 in Norwich. His birth was registered in the second quarter of 1895. He was the second of five children. At the time of the 1901 census, his family was still living in Norwich and his father was described as a commercial traveller in the tea trade. However, by 1911, the family had moved to Muswell Hill, a suburb of London. His father, Stephen Francis Stackard (1861–1918), was a glass bottle manufacturer.

== Military career ==
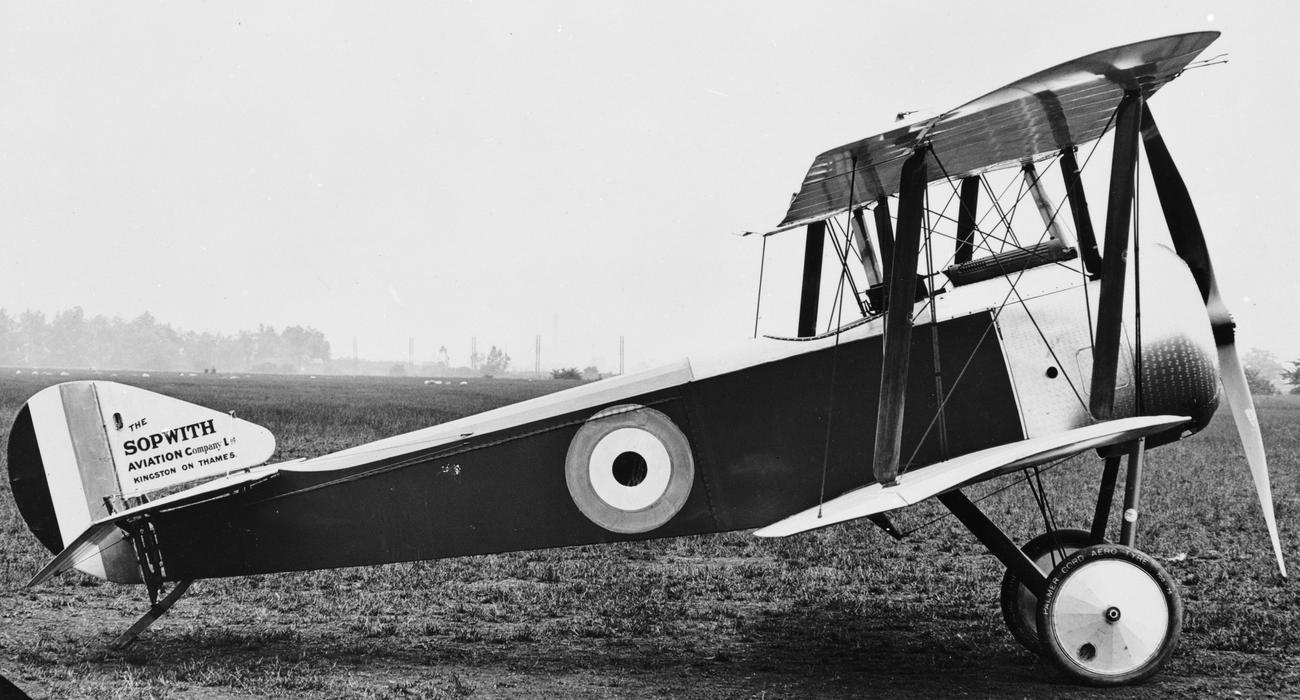
Sopwith Pup

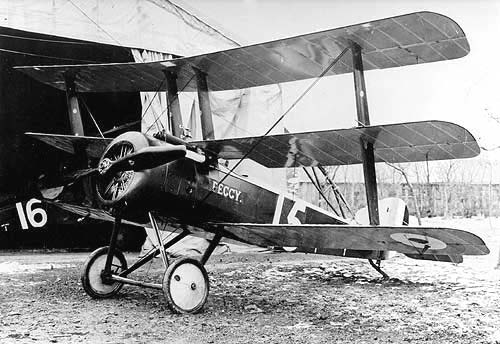
Sopwith Triplane

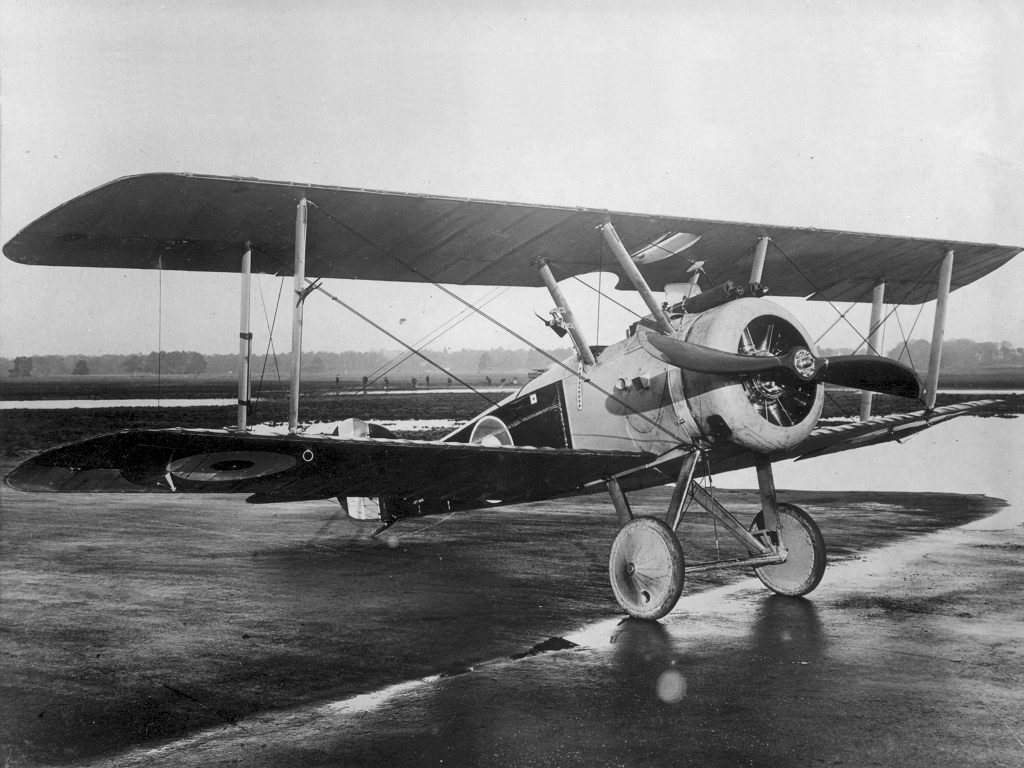
Sopwith Camel

Harold Stackard initially was a subaltern in the Royal Naval Division. He served for five months on HMS Oratava of the 10th Cruiser Squadron. After serving in France (1914) and Gallipoli (1915), he transferred to the Royal Naval Air Service in October 1916. On 7 December 1916, Stackard was promoted from Probationary Flight Officer to Flight Sub-Lieutenant. On 26 December 1916, he was the pilot of Bristol Scout (N5405) when its undercarriage collapsed upon landing at the Royal Naval Air Station at Redcar in Yorkshire. After his training was completed, the pilot spent eight months on the Western Front with No. 9 Squadron of the Royal Naval Air Service. Despite spending four years in the service, having been wounded, and having been credited with fifteen aerial victories, Stackard does not appear to have been decorated.

Harold Stackard scored his first victory on 2 May 1917 when, from his Sopwith Pup, a single-seat biplane with serial number 9916, he destroyed a two-seat aircraft over Middelkerke, West Flanders, Belgium. The victory was shared with a Canadian, Flight Sub-Lieutenant Harold Mott. However, on the morning of 4 May 1917, Stackard was shot down and crashed northeast of Ypres. On 31 May 1917, while piloting a Sopwith Pup, he sent a two-seater out of control over Ostend, West Flanders. The kill was shared with Flight Commander Fred Banbury and Flight Sub-Lieutenant Shearer. Stackard scored his third victory, from the single-seat Sopwith Triplane (N5451). On 8 June 1917, he sent an Albatros D.III out of control over Diksmuide, West Flanders. On 14 June 1917, Flight Sub-Lieutenant Harold F. Stackard was reported wounded. That report may refer to the May incident.

Stackard's remaining twelve victories were all from Sopwith Camel aircraft, single-seat biplanes. His next two kills were both from Sopwith Camel (B6204). On 3 September 1917, he destroyed an Albatros D.III southeast of Pervijze, West Flanders. It was shared with Flight Commander Joseph Fall, Flight Sub-Lieutenant J E Scott, and Flight Sub-Lieutenant Arthur Wood. The following day, Stackard destroyed a DFW C over the Nieuwpoort-Middelkerke area. He shared that fifth victory with Joseph Fall and J. E. Scott. Pilot Stackard had his sixth triumph on 6 September 1917, when he drove an Albatros C out of control over Middelkerke. It was shared with Arthur Wood, Flight Sub-Lieutenant Hazel Wallace, J. E. Scott, and Joseph Fall. Stackard racked up his seventh victory on 9 September 1917 while piloting his Sopwith Camel (B6204). He sent an Albatros D.V out of control east of Middelkerke, aided by Joseph Fall.

Pilot Stackard scored a double kill on the afternoon of 11 September 1917 from his Sopwith Camel (B3863). He destroyed two Albatros D.V aircraft over Leke, West Flanders, one in flames. He shared both kills with Joseph Fall and Arthur Wood. His tenth victory occurred on 13 September 1917, when he sent another Albatros D.V out of control east of Leke. It was shared with Flight Sub-Lieutenant Stearne Edwards. He scored another double victory on 24 September 1917 from Sopwith Camel (B3883). First, he sent an Albatros D.III out of control over Leke, shared with Joseph Fall and Arthur Wood. Then, he drove an Albatros D.V out of control over Middelkerke.

On 30 September 1917, Stackard racked up yet another double victory, again with Sopwith Camel (B3883). South of Middelkerke, an Albatros C was destroyed, and, one hour later, another was sent out of control. The first that day was a shared victory, with Joseph Fall and Arthur Wood. Stackard's fifteenth and final victory took place on 27 October 1917. From Sopwith Camel (B6327), he sent an Albatros D.V out of control. It was shared with Stearne Edwards and others.

The pilot was an instructor at RAF Cranwell in Lincolnshire by 1918. The 2 January 1918 edition of the Supplement to the Edinburgh Gazette announced his promotion to Lieutenant. Harold Stackard transferred to the No. 157 Squadron, formed in July 1918, of the Royal Air Force. He had the opportunity to fly the Sopwith Salamander fighter before he left the service. The Salamander had been developed as a ground attack aircraft. However, the war ended before the plane saw service in the squadrons.

== After the war ==
On 7 Nov 1920, Harold Francis Stackard of Muswell Hill, London, married Ruth Mary Savage, daughter of Herbert Francis Savage and his wife Emma Florence King Savage, of Winchester. Harold eventually became branch manager of Commercial Union Assurance Company, an insurance company, in Calcutta, India. Stackard died at age 54 on 24 November 1949 at Fittleworth, West Sussex, England. His widow survived him by nearly 46 years, and died at the age of 100, having been born on 25 July 1895, and having her death registered in October 1995.

== Gallery of aircraft downed ==
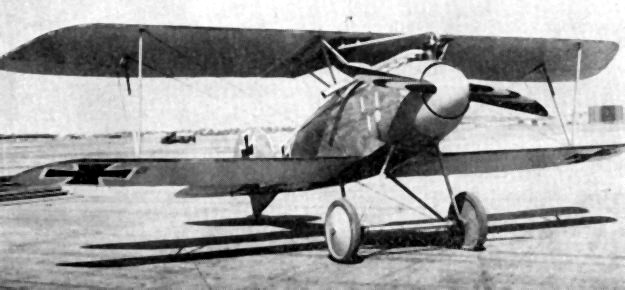
Albatros D.III
Victories 3, 4, 11

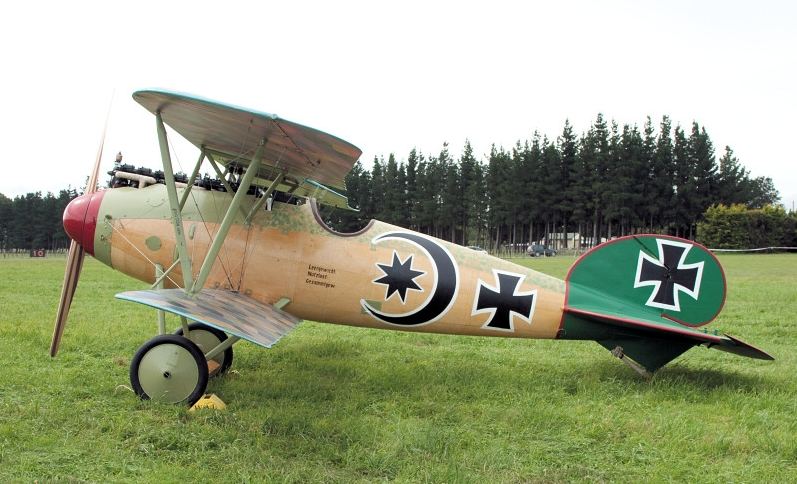
Albatros D.V
Victories 7–10, 12, 15

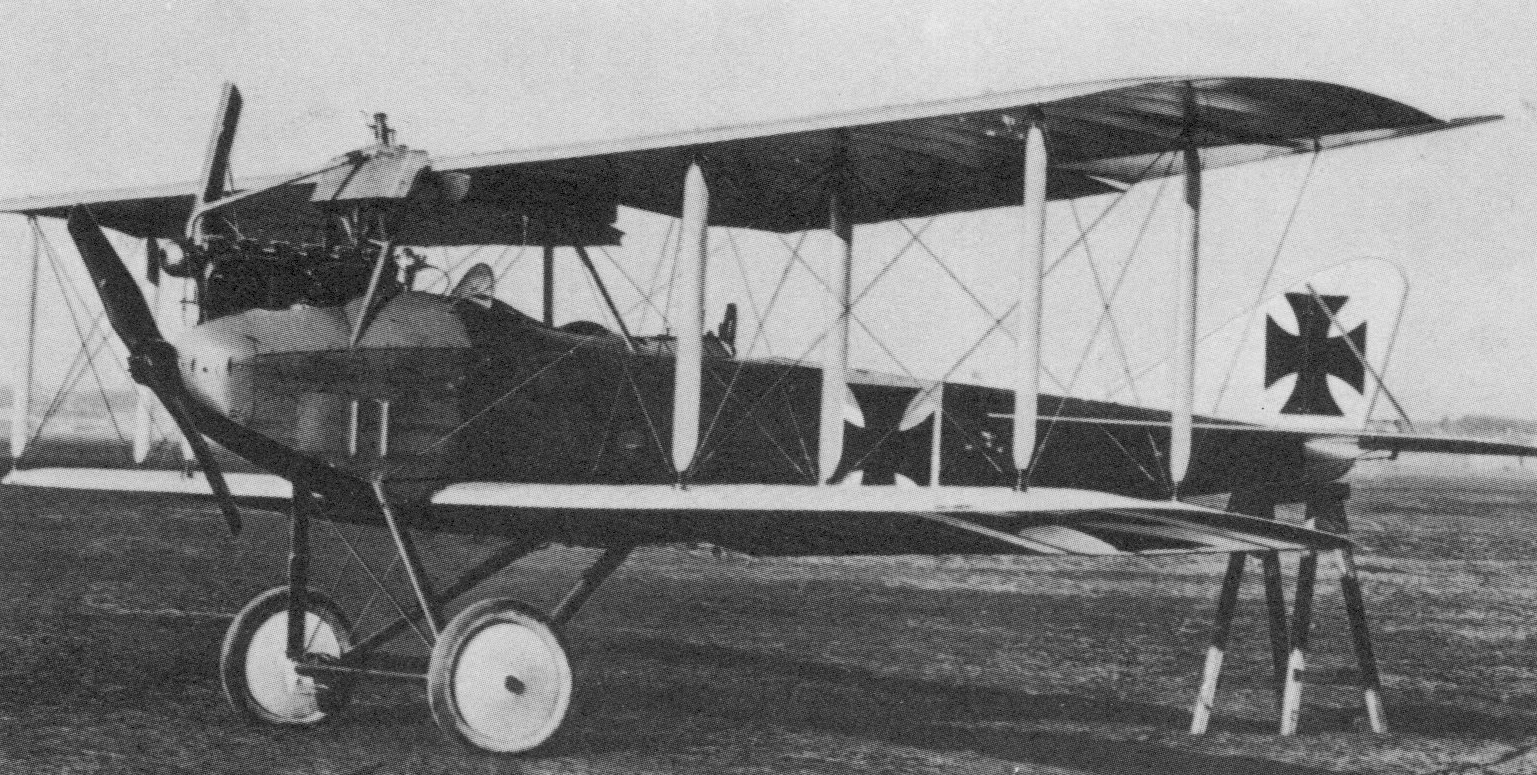
Albatros C
Victories 6, 13, 14

== See also ==
- Aerial victory standards of World War I
