= Merrill Taylor =

Canadian flying ace

- Born: 15 April 1893; Singhampton, Ontario, Canada
- Died: 7 July 1918 (aged 25); Hamel, France
- Burial place: Arras Flying Services Memorial
- Military career
- Allegiance: Canada; United Kingdom
- Branch: Canadian Expeditionary Force; Royal Naval Air Service; Royal Air Force
- Rank: Lieutenant
- Unit: No. 9 Naval Squadron/No. 209 Squadron RAF
- Conflicts: First World War
- Awards: Croix de Guerre (France)

Merrill Samuel Taylor (15 April 1893 – 7 July 1918) was a Canadian flying ace of the First World War. He was credited with seven aerial victories while flying a Sopwith Camel fighter for the Royal Naval Air Service and, later, the Royal Air Force. He touched off the air battle that resulted in the death of the war's leading ace, Manfred von Richthofen, on 21 April 1918. On 2 May 1918, he killed German ace Hans Weiss for his fifth victory. Taylor was killed in action by Franz Büchner on 7 July 1918.

== Early life ==
Merrill Samuel Taylor was born in Clearview, Ontario, Canada on 15 April 1893, the son of Samuel Taylor. The younger Taylor was schooled in Singhampton and Yellow Grass, Saskatchewan before matriculating at the University of Toronto in Applied Science from 1912 to 1916.

Taylor was a bachelor, and an enthusiastic rugby football player, when he enlisted on 17 April 1916 into the university's Training Company of the Canadian Overseas Expeditionary Force. His enlistment attestation listed his next of kin as his mother, Mary Taylor, who was residing in Regina, Saskatchewan. His physical examination showed him to be 5 feet 7 3/4 inches tall, dark complected, with black hair, hazel eyes, and a scar on his left jaw.

== First World War ==
On 19 January 1917, Taylor was appointed to the position of probationary flying officer. By 23 July 1917, Taylor was commissioned as a Flight Sub-Lieutenant, indicating he had completed pilot's training. His first assignment was to the Dover Patrol, on 23 August 1917. He was then posted to No. 9 Naval Squadron of the Royal Naval Air Service as a Sopwith Camel pilot, scoring his first aerial victory on 28 September 1917. At 1620 hours that day, he was part of a squadron sweep that destroyed an Albatros D.III over Diksmuide, Belgium. He shared the victory with Stearne Tighe Edwards, Fred Everest Banbury, Oliver Redgate, and John Hales.

Taylor's second victory, coming just three weeks after 9 Naval became part of the brand new Royal Air Force, was a momentous one. He teamed with Oliver Colin LeBoutillier to incinerate a German Albatros two-seater at 1025 hours on 21 April 1918. The two ex-naval pilots thus touched off the chain of events that led to the death of the war's greatest ace, Manfred von Richthofen in that day's dogfighting.

The following morning, on another squadron mission, Taylor joined Robert Foster and three other pilots in capturing a German two-seater at Albert, France. Both members of the aircrew were killed in the process. Then, at 1445 hours on 27 April 1918, Taylor drove down an Albatros D.V out of control east of Villers-Bretonneux, France.

At noon on 2 May, Taylor became an ace. German ace Hans Weiss, flying a Fokker Triplane, attacked one of Taylor's squadronmates a mile south of Cerisy, France. Taylor killed Weiss with a bullet through the head and destroyed his white Triplane.

Victory number six came for Taylor on 15 May, when he drove down an Albatros D.V between Belloy and Pozières, France. The following day, he ended his victory list by helping to capture Leutnant Hubner of Jagdstaffel 4. Wilfrid May and Stearne Tighe Edwards helped force the German triplane to ground and its pilot to a prisoner of war camp.

On 7 July 1918, over Hamel, France, Taylor was shot down and killed in action by Franz Büchner. Lieutenant Merrill Samuel Taylor's grave is unknown; he is memorialized at the Arras Flying Services Memorial, Arras, France. Taylor was awarded the Croix de Guerre by the French government for his valour.
