= Daniel Galbraith =

Daniel Galbraith may refer to:

- Daniel Galbraith (Ontario politician) (1813–1879), Canadian farmer and political figure in Ontario
- Daniel Harcourt Galbraith (1878–1968), member of the Legislative Assembly of Alberta
- Daniel Murray Bayne Galbraith (1895–1921), World War I flying ace
- Danny Galbraith (born 1990), Scottish footballer
