= John Grandy =

Marshal of the Royal Air Force (1913–2004)

Marshal of the Royal Air Force Sir John Grandy GCB GCVO KBE DSO KStJ
- Marshal of the Royal Air Force Sir John Grandy
- Born: 8 February 1913; Northwood, London
- Died: 2 January 2004 (aged 90); Slough, Berkshire
- Military career
- Allegiance: United Kingdom
- Branch: Royal Air Force
- Service years: 1931–1971
- Rank: Marshal of the Royal Air Force
- Commands: Chief of the Air Staff (1967–71); Far East Command (1965–67); Bomber Command (1963–65); RAF Germany (1961–63); Central Fighter Establishment (1954–56); Northern Sector of Fighter Command (1950–52); No. 341 Wing (1945); No. 73 Operational Training Unit (1944–45); No. 210 Group (1943); RAF Duxford (1942–43); No. 249 Squadron (1940); No. 219 Squadron (1940)
- Conflicts: Second World War: Battle of Britain; Indonesia–Malaysia confrontation
- Awards: Knight Grand Cross of the Order of the Bath; Knight Grand Cross of the Royal Victorian Order; Knight Commander of the Order of the British Empire; Companion of the Distinguished Service Order; Knight of the Venerable Order of Saint John; Mentioned in Despatches (2); Commander of the Order of the Defender of the Realm (Malaysia)
- Other work: Governor of Gibraltar; Constable and Governor of Windsor Castle

Marshal of the Royal Air Force Sir John Grandy, GCB, GCVO, KBE, DSO, KStJ (8 February 1913 – 2 January 2004) was a senior officer in the Royal Air Force. He was the only officer who fought and commanded a squadron during the Battle of Britain to reach the post of Chief of the Air Staff. In the latter role he implemented the final stages of the RAF's withdrawal from the Persian Gulf and the Far East, oversaw the ordering and subsequent cancellation of the F-111 strike aircraft and handed over Britain's nuclear deterrent role to the Royal Navy.

== RAF career ==
The son of Francis Grandy and his wife, Nell Grandy (née Lines), Grandy was educated at Northwood Preparatory School and the University College School in London, and was commissioned into the Royal Air Force as a pilot officer on a probationary basis on 11 September 1931. After completing flying training, he was posted as a pilot to No. 54 Squadron flying Bulldogs from RAF Hornchurch in August 1932. He was confirmed in the rank of pilot officer on 11 September 1932 and promoted to flying officer on 11 June 1933. He became Adjutant of No. 604 (County of Middlesex) Squadron at RAF Hendon in April 1935 and attended the Instructors' Course at the Central Flying School in January 1936. He was promoted to flight lieutenant on 11 June 1936 and was posted to the University of London Air Squadron as Adjutant in January 1937.

Grandy served in the Second World War, initially as Squadron Commander at No. 13 Flying Training School. In April 1940 he was given command of No. 219 Squadron flying Blenheims from RAF Catterick on night patrol duties and then went on a month later to command No. 249 Squadron flying Hurricanes from RAF Church Fenton during the Battle of Britain. One of his pilots won the Victoria Cross. Gandy himself was shot down and hospitalised in September 1940. In December 1940 he joined the Air Staff at Headquarters RAF Fighter Command and then transferred to the Staff at No. 52 Operational Training Unit. He was promoted to wing commander on a temporary basis on 1 March 1941 and in November 1941 he was sent to RAF Duxford where he was given command of flying operations. In February 1942, he was given overall command of RAF Duxford and he oversaw the establishment there of the RAF's first Typhoon Wing. He was promoted to wing commander on a war substantive basis on 12 August 1942 and mentioned in despatches on 1 January 1943.

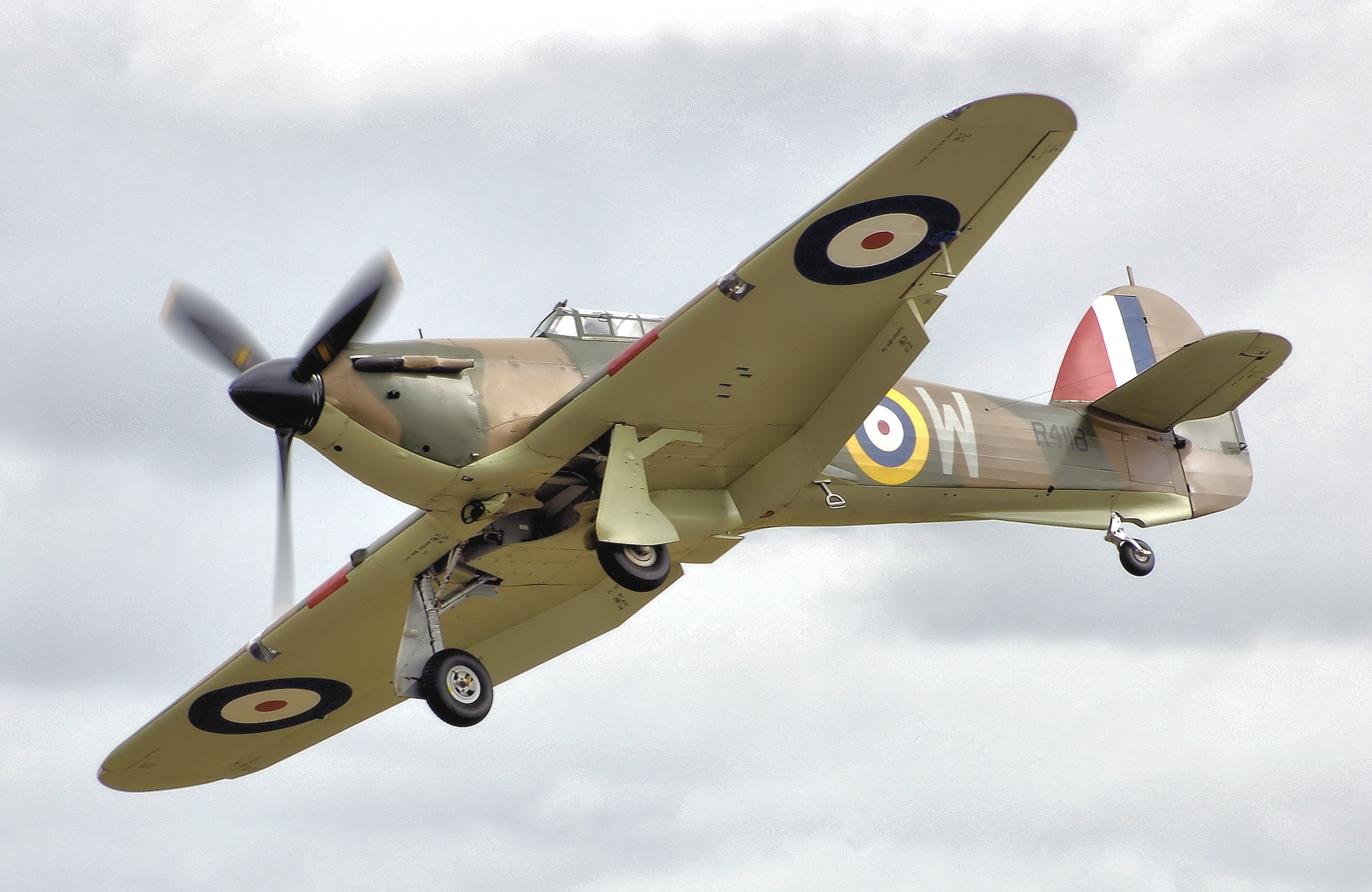
Hawker Hurricane, a type flown by Grandy during the Battle of Britain

Grandy was given command of No. 210 Group RAF defending the Port of Tripoli in February 1943 and then went to Egypt to command No. 73 Operational Training Unit at RAF Abu Suwayr in September 1943. Having been promoted to the temporary rank of group captain on 1 July 1944, he became Officer Commanding No. 341 Wing fighting the Japanese in the Far East in February 1945. He became Senior Air Staff Officer at Headquarters No. 232 Group in September 1945 and was appointed a Companion of the Distinguished Service Order on 19 October 1945.

After the war Grandy became deputy director of Operational Training at the Air Ministry from 1946 and became Air Attaché in Brussels in January 1949. He was promoted to group captain on a substantive basis on 1 January 1950, before becoming Officer Commanding the Northern Sector of Fighter Command in November 1950. He joined the Air Staff in the Operations Directorate at Headquarters Fighter Command in May 1952 and went on to be Commandant of the Central Fighter Establishment in December 1954. He was appointed a Companion of the Order of the Bath in the 1956 Birthday Honours and promoted to air commodore on 1 January 1956. He attended Imperial Defence College in early 1957 and then became Commander of Operation Grapple (the Hydrogen Bomb testing programme) in September 1957. He was promoted to acting air vice marshal on 6 December 1957 and became Assistant Chief of the Air Staff (Operations) in October 1958. He was confirmed in the rank of air vice marshal on 1 July 1958.

Promoted to acting air marshal on 7 January 1961, Grandy became Commander-in-Chief of RAF Germany as well as Commander of the Second Tactical Air Force in January 1961. He was appointed a Knight Commander of the Order of the British Empire in the 1961 Birthday Honours and confirmed in the rank of air marshal on 1 January 1962. On return to the United Kingdom, he was appointed Commander-in-Chief Bomber Command on 1 September 1963 and, having been advanced to Knight Commander of the Order of the Bath in the 1964 Birthday Honours, he went on to become Commander-in-Chief, Far East Command during the latter stages of the Indonesia–Malaysia confrontation on 28 May 1965. He was promoted to air chief marshal on 1 April 1965.

Advanced to Knight Grand Cross of the Order of the Bath in the 1967 New Year Honours and appointed an honorary Commander of the Malaysian Order of the Defender of the Realm, Grandy became Chief of the Air Staff on 1 April that year. He was the only officer who fought and commanded a squadron during the Battle of Britain to reach the post of Chief of the Air Staff. As Chief of the Air Staff he implemented the final stages of the RAF's withdrawal from the Persian Gulf and the Far East, oversaw the ordering and subsequent cancellation of the F-111 strike aircraft and handed over Britain's nuclear deterrent role to the Royal Navy. He retired on 31 March 1971 and was promoted to Marshal of the Royal Air Force on 1 April 1971.

== Later work ==
Grandy served as Governor of Gibraltar from 3 October 1973 to 30 May 1978 and then as Constable and Governor of Windsor Castle from 11 August 1978 to 9 February 1988. He was appointed a Knight of the Venerable Order of Saint John on 31 January 1974 and a Knight Grand Cross of the Royal Victorian Order in the 1988 New Year Honours. He was also Chairman of the Trustees of the Imperial War Museum. He died, following a stroke, at Wexham Park Hospital in Slough on 2 January 2004.

== Personal life ==
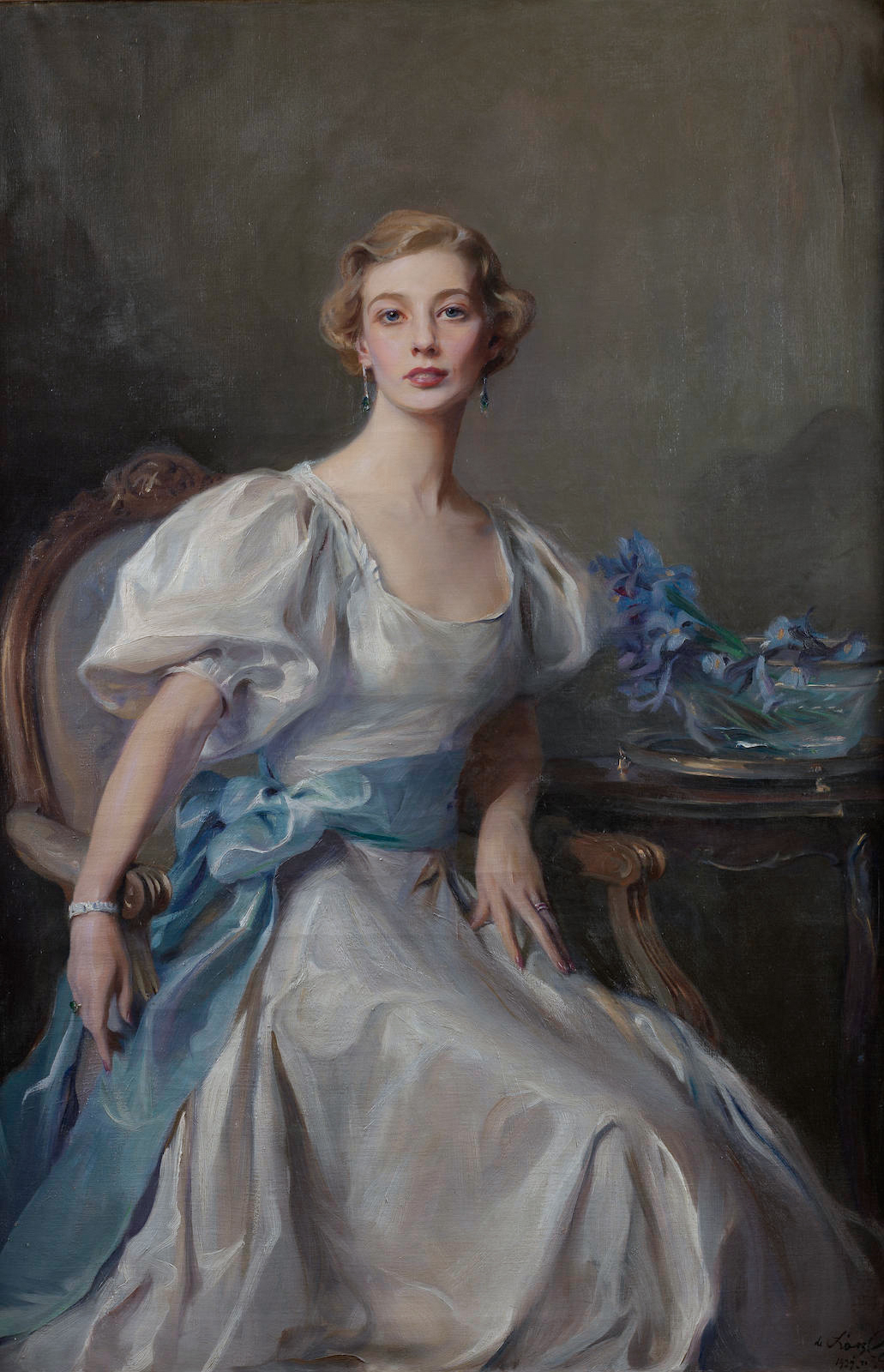
Cecile Rankin (Philip de László, 1937)

In 1937 he married Cecile Rankin (daughter of Sir Robert Rankin); they had two sons. His interests included golf and his membership of the Royal Yacht Squadron.

== Sources ==
- Probert, Henry (1991). High Commanders of the Royal Air Force. HMSO. ISBN 0-11-772635-4.

Military offices
Preceded by Sir Humphrey Edwardes-Jones	Commander-in-Chief RAF Germany; Also Commander of the Second Tactical Air Force; 1961–1963	Succeeded by Sir Ronald Lees
Preceded by Sir Kenneth Cross	Commander-in-Chief Bomber Command; 1963–1965	Succeeded by Sir Wallace Kyle
Preceded by Sir Varyl Begg	Commander-in-Chief Far East Command; 1965–1967	Succeeded by Sir Michael Carver
Preceded by Sir Charles Elworthy	Chief of the Air Staff; 1967–1971	Succeeded by Sir Denis Spotswood
Government offices
Preceded by Sir Varyl Begg	Governor of Gibraltar; 1973–1978	Succeeded by Sir William Jackson
Honorary titles
Preceded by The Lord Elworthy	Constable and Governor of Windsor Castle; 1978–1988	Succeeded by Sir David Hallifax
