= Colin Brown (RAF officer) =

Scottish officer

Colin Peter Brown
- Born: 20 December 1898; Langside, Scotland
- Died: 19 October 1965 (aged 66)
- Military career
- Allegiance: United Kingdom
- Branch: Royal Navy (1917–18); Royal Air Force (1918–54)
- Service years: 1917–1954
- Rank: Air Vice Marshal
- Commands: RAF Catterick (1937–38); No. 26 Squadron (1935–37)
- Conflicts: World War I World War II
- Awards: Companion of the Order of the Bath; Commander of the Order of the British Empire; Distinguished Flying Cross & Bar; Croix de guerre (France)

Air Vice Marshal Colin Peter Brown CB, CBE, DFC & Bar (20 December 1898 – 19 October 1965) was a Scottish officer who began his career in the Royal Naval Air Service during the First World War, before transferring to the Royal Air Force (RAF). A flying ace credited with 14 aerial victories, he remained in the RAF and served throughout the Second World War, retiring in 1954.

== Early life and career ==
Brown was born in Langside, Glasgow, and was educated at Dulwich College, London.

He entered the Royal Naval Air Service as a probationary flight officer on 28 January 1917, and was commissioned as a flight sub-lieutenant on 13 June. He was posted to the Seaplane Defence Flight, a unit created to defend the seaplanes which operated out of Dunkirk, flying the Sopwith Camel. His first aerial victory came on 13 November 1917 when he destroyed an Albatros D.V east of Nieuport, but it was another five months before he gained a second victory, forcing down another Albatros D.V over Uitkerke on 27 April 1918. In between these two victories, on 15 January 1918 the Seaplane Defence Flight had been renamed No. 13 (Naval) Squadron, and on 1 April 1918 it became No. 213 Squadron RAF.

Brown was granted a commission as a second lieutenant in the RAF on 3 July 1918. He was soon promoted to lieutenant, and on 9 August was appointed acting-captain while serving as a flight commander.

Brown was noted for his willingness to fight, attacking land and sea targets as well as enemy aircraft. He even went so far as to strafe Zeebrugge harbor in a night attack. He accrued victories steadily until his climactic solo destruction of three Fokker D.VIIs on 4 October 1918. In total, Brown was credited with eight enemy aircraft destroyed and six driven down out of control in 374 flying hours. Eleven of his wins were over first-rate German fighters; Albatros D.Vs and Fokker D.VIIs. Two of his three victories over observation planes, he shared with other pilots, including the American ace, and future United States Navy rear admiral, David Ingalls.

On account of his combat record Brown was twice awarded the Distinguished Flying Cross; firstly on 21 September 1918 and then again on 29 November. He also received the Croix de Guerre from France, for his "services in Flanders" on 1 November.

His citations read:

Distinguished Flying Cross

Lieutenant Colin Peter Brown (Sea Patrol).
Was engaged in a bombing raid on an enemy seaplane base by night, and dropped his bombs from a height of 500 feet, causing considerable destruction. Shortly afterwards he bombed an enemy aerodrome in daylight, also from a height of 500 feet, and then descended to 300 feet and destroyed an enemy machine. On arriving at his aerodrome fifty-nine bullet-holes were found in his machine. He has since then destroyed two enemy aeroplanes. Lieutenant Brown has been engaged in several other aerial fights, and has proved himself a gallant and resourceful flight leader.

Bar to the Distinguished Flying Cross

Lieutenant (Acting-Captain) Colin Peter Brown DFC. (Sea Patrol Flanders).
A fine fighting pilot and brilliant leader who has destroyed thirteen enemy aircraft. On 4 October he led his formation of fifteen scouts to attack a superior number of the enemy. Nine of the latter were destroyed, Captain Brown, single-handed, accounting for three.

== Inter-war career ==
On 1 August 1919 the RAF introduced its own rank structure and Brown changed from lieutenant to flying officer. From 25 November he served aboard the aircraft carrier HMS Argus, and on 31 May 1920 was appointed an instructor at the School of Naval Co-operation and Aerial Navigation. On 5 January 1921 he was posted to No. 205 Squadron, and on 1 October to No. 3 Squadron, flying the Airco DH.9A from RAF Leuchars. On 6 September 1922, he was injured after making a forced landing in the Moray Firth, following an engine failure. On 1 April 1923 he was assigned to No. 420 Flight.

Beginning in September 1923 he took the Signals Course at the Electrical and Wireless School at RAF Flowerdown, and in September 1924 was appointed a staff officer in the Signals Branch, at the Air Ministry. He was promoted to flight lieutenant on 1 January 1925. From 19 September 1927 he attended the RAF Staff College in Andover, Hampshire. On 29 January 1929 Brown was posted to No. 30 Squadron in Iraq, transferring to No. 84 Squadron at RAF Shaibah, Iraq, on 16 March to serve as a flight commander. On 28 August he was posted to the Headquarters of Iraq Command.

On 1 February 1931 Brown was posted to No. 13 Squadron at RAF Netheravon to serve as a signals officer. On 12 December 1932 he became a staff officer in the Signals Branch. He was promoted to squadron leader on 1 October 1934, and from 1 December served as a signals officer, serving at No. 21 Group Headquarters, South Farnborough, on signals duties until 10 November 1935.

On 5 October 1935 he was appointed commander of No. 26 (Army Co-operation) Squadron at RAF Catterick. On 30 August 1937 he was appointed station commander at RAF Catterick. On 1 January 1938 he was promoted to wing commander, and on 4 July was assigned to the Directorate of Staff Duties at the Air Ministry.

== Second World War ==
Brown was promoted to acting group captain on 1 March 1940, and appointed Senior Air Staff Officer in No. 60 (Signals) Group, Fighter Command, which was responsible for the RAF's radar network. On 24 April he was transferred to the RAF's Technical Branch. On 1 September he was promoted to temporary group captain. In September 1941 he was made a Commander of the Order of the British Empire (CBE) "in recognition of distinguished services rendered in operational commands of the Royal Air Force during the period 1st October 1940 to 31st March 1941".

He was appointed acting-air commodore on 19 August 1942, to serve as Director of Radar at the Air Ministry, appointed group captain (war substantive) on 19 February 1943, and promoted to group captain on 1 December. He served in the Directorate of Operational Requirements at the Air Ministry from 1945 until December 1947. On 14 June 1945, in the King's birthday honours, he was made a Companion of the Order of the Bath (CB).

== Post-war career ==
Brown was promoted to air commodore on 1 July 1947, and from 1949 served as Chief Signals Officer, Middle East Air Force. He was appointed acting air vice-marshal on 7 April 1950 to serve as Assistant Controller of Supplies (Air) at the Ministry of Supply, and was promoted to air vice-marshal on 1 January 1952. Brown was forced by ill-health to resign from his post in early 1953. He eventually left the RAF on 15 March 1954.

Air Vice Marshal Brown died on 19 October 1965.
