= Charles Sims (RAF officer) =

English World War I flying ace

Charles John Sims
- Born: 20 December 1899; Bournemouth, England
- Died: 30 December 1929 (aged 30)
- Military career
- Allegiance: United Kingdom
- Branch: Royal Navy; Royal Air Force
- Service years: 1917–1929
- Rank: Flight lieutenant
- Units: No. 13 (Naval) Squadron RNAS; No. 213 Squadron RAF; No. 24 Squadron RAF
- Conflicts: World War I • Western Front
- Awards: Distinguished Flying Cross

Flight Lieutenant Charles John Sims, DFC (20 December 1899 – 30 December 1929) was an English World War I flying ace credited with nine aerial victories. His most notable victory saw him shoot down an enemy aircraft that crashed into another, giving Sims a double win. However, his Distinguished Flying Cross was awarded for his courage in ground attack missions.

== Early life ==
Charles John Sims was born in Bournemouth, England on 20 December 1899.

== World War I ==
Sims entered the Royal Naval Air Service as a probationary flight officer with seniority from 24 October 1917. He was assigned to No. 13 (Naval) Squadron, which later became No. 213 Squadron RAF when the RNAS was merged with the Army's Royal Flying Corps to form the Royal Air Force on 1 April 1918. Flying a Sopwith Camel single-seat fighter he was diligent in trench strafing and ground support missions. He also scored nine aerial victories between 9 July and 9 November 1918, just before the end of hostilities. His most notable wins were on 25 September, when one Fokker D.VII he downed spun into a second, taking it out also; and his triple win on 14 October. His final tally was a balloon and four German aircraft destroyed solo, two shared with other pilots, and two driven down out of control.

He was awarded the Distinguished Flying Cross on 2 November 1918. His citation read:

Lieutenant Charles John Sims (Sea Patrol).

"In a recent raid on an aerodrome this officer at 200 feet altitude bombed the objective, obtaining a direct hit; he then descended to about 50 feet altitude and attacked some Fokker biplanes lined up outside the hangars. He is an officer of exceptional courage and ability, possessing remarkable powers of observation."

=== List of aerial victories ===
Combat record
No.	Date/Time	Aircraft/ Serial No.	Opponent	Result	Location
1	7 July 1918 @ 1140	Sopwith Camel (D9672)	Albatros D.V	Driven down out of control	Middelkerke
2	31 July 1918 @ 1935	Sopwith Camel (D9490)	Seaplane	Destroyed	15 miles (24 km) north-west of Ostend
3	11 August 1918 @ 1550	Sopwith Camel (D9490)	Fokker D.VII	Destroyed	5 miles (8 km) south-east of Ostend
4	25 September 1918 @ 1835	Sopwith Camel (D7272)	Fokker D.VII	Destroyed	South-west of Ostend
5	25 September 1918 @ 1835	Sopwith Camel (D7272)	Fokker D.VII	Destroyed	South-west of Ostend
6	14 October 1918 @ 1430	Sopwith Camel (D7272)	Fokker D.VII	Destroyed	Leke
7	14 October 1918 @ 1430	Sopwith Camel (D7272)	Fokker D.VII	Driven down out of control	Leke
8	14 October 1918 @ 1430	Sopwith Camel (D7272)	Fokker D.VII	Destroyed	Leke
9	9 November 1918 @ 1025	Sopwith Camel (D7272)	Balloon	Destroyed	5 miles (8 km) north-west of Ghent

== Post-war career ==
Sims stayed in RAF service post-war. On 1 August 1919, as the RAF reorganized for peacetime, he was granted a permanent commission as a lieutenant.

In November 1920 he was elected a student member of the Royal Aeronautical Society, and in October 1922 was selected for Aeronautical Research Course "C" at the Imperial College of Science and Technology in London. He finally presented his thesis in October 1925 and was awarded a Diploma of Imperial College for advanced study and research. He published a paper detailing his experiments with fuel additives for aircraft engines in May 1926.

On 1 January 1926, he was promoted from flying officer to flight lieutenant. On 10 September 1926 he was posted to No. 24 Squadron, based at RAF Kenley, but his stay was a brief one, as he was reassigned to the RAF School of Photography at RAF Farnborough on 27 October.

In July 1929 Sims went to Iraq to "make secret experiments". On 30 December 1929, about a month after he returned from Iraq, he was found dead in his bedroom at Farnborough with a bullet wound in his side and a gun nearby; an inquest returned an open verdict.
