= Francis Richard Lee Mellersh =

British flying ace of WWII

- Born: 30 July 1922; Edwalton, Nottinghamshire, England
- Died: 1996; Harrington, Kent, England
- Relatives: Francis Mellersh (father)
- Military career
- Allegiance: United Kingdom
- Branch: Royal Air Force
- Service years: 1940–1977
- Rank: Air Vice-Marshal
- Commands: No. 153 Squadron (1956–1957); RAF West Raynham (1965–1967)
- Conflicts: Second World War: Invasion of Sicily; Operation Diver; Cold War
- Awards: Companion of the Order of the Bath; Distinguished Flying Cross & Bar

Francis Richard Lee Mellersh, CB, DFC & Bar (30 July 1922 – 1996) was a British flying ace who served with the Royal Air Force (RAF) during the Second World War and the postwar period. He was credited with having shot down at least eight aircraft as well several V-1 flying bombs.

From Edwalton, Mellersh enlisted in the RAF in 1940 and was posted to No. 29 Squadron once his training was completed the following year. In late 1942 he was posted to North Africa to serve with No. 600 Squadron, flying Bristol Beaufighter heavy fighters on night fighting duties. He achieved several aerial victories over the following months as the squadron carried out its duties in North Africa and later Sicily and was recognised for his successes with the Distinguished Flying Cross (DFC). Returning to the United Kingdom toward the end of 1943, he performed instructing and testing duties until June 1944, when he joined No. 96 Squadron. He flew throughout the squadron's involvement in Operation Diver, the RAF's campaign against the V-1 flying bomb; he was credited with the destruction of at least 39 V-1s and received a Bar to his DFC. He end the war serving with the Fighter Interception Development Squadron.

Remaining with the RAF in the postwar period, he served in a series of staff posts in the United Kingdom and abroad but also had spells in command of a fighter squadron and of a RAF station. By 1972 he held the rank of air vice-marshal and his final post before his retirement in early 1977 was with Training Command as Air Officer, Flying and Officer Training. Appointed a Companion of the Order of the Bath the same year, he settled in Harrington, in Kent, where he died in 1996.

== Early life ==
Francis Richard Lee Mellersh was born on 30 July 1922 at Edwalton in Nottinghamshire, England. His father, Francis Mellersh, was a former flying ace of the Royal Naval Air Service, and from 1918 served in the Royal Air Force (RAF). He was educated at Winchester College before going on to the Imperial Service College.

== Second World War ==
Mellersh enlisted in the Royal Air Force Volunteer Reserve in 1940. He trained as a sergeant pilot at No. 51 Operational Training Unit (OTU) at Cranwell before being posted to No. 29 Squadron in December 1941. By this time he held the rank of pilot officer, having been commissioned a few months prior. No. 29 Squadron, based at West Malling, was one of the earliest night fighter squadrons to use radar, operating Bristol Beaufighters heavy fighters on night patrols over the southeast of England. Mellersh flew with the squadron until November 1942, during which time he was promoted to flying officer. He was then posted to No. 600 Squadron. This was stationed at Maison Blanche in Algeria from where it carried out patrols along the Mediterranean coast. He arrived at the squadron on 25 December, having flown a Beaufighter there from the United Kingdom.

=== Night fighting duties ===
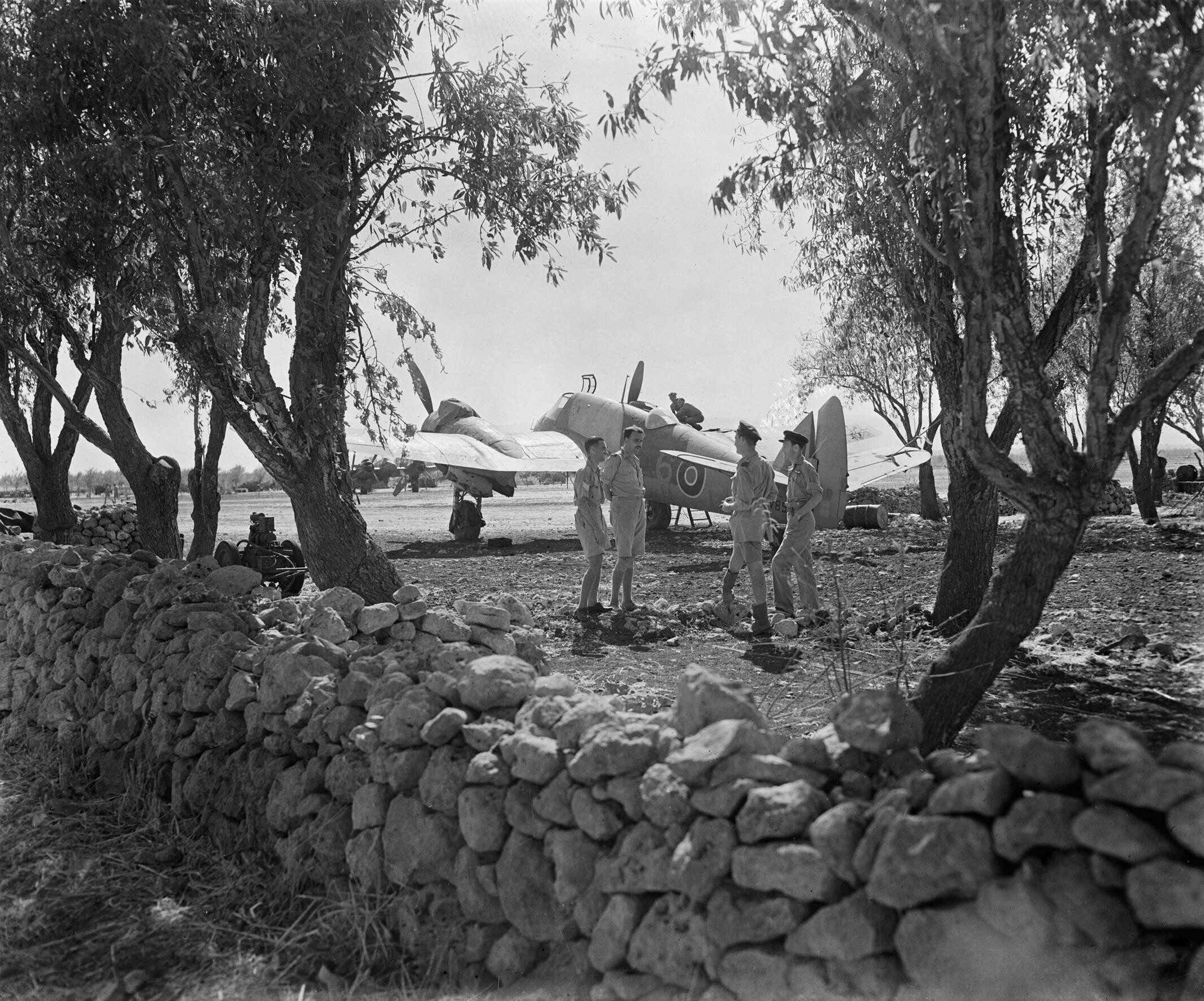
A Bristol Beaufighter of No. 600 Squadron on an airfield in Sicily, 1943

Mellersh's first aerial victories were on the night of 18 April 1943, when he shot down two Junkers Ju 88 medium bombers several miles to the north of Algiers. He destroyed a Junkers Ju 52 transport aircraft in the vicinity of Cap Bon on the night of 8 May. In June the squadron moved to Malta from where it commenced operations to support the Allied invasion of Sicily. On the night of 12 July, he shot down a CANT Z.1007 medium bomber 15 miles (24 km) from Cape Spartivento and then a Ju 88 to the east of the cape, two of the six claimed destroyed by pilots of the squadron that night. The squadron moved to Sicily on 28 July, and the next night Mellersh shot down a Heinkel He 111 medium bomber to the east of Mount Etna. He probably destroyed a Savoia-Marchetti S.84 transport aircraft near Cassibile on the night of 3 August. He shot down a Ju 88 near Augusta on the night of 9 August. Later in August, he was recognised for his successes over the preceding months with an award of the Distinguished Flying Cross (DFC). The citation was published in The London Gazette and read:

This officer is a tenacious and skilful fighter and has destroyed 5 enemy aircraft in combat. On 1 occasion in April, 1943, during a patrol off Algiers at dusk, he encountered a large formation of enemy aircraft. In the ensuing engagement, Flying Officer Mellersh shot down 2 of them. Although his aircraft was badly damaged he flew it to base. More recently, in July, 1943, Flying Officer Mellersh destroyed 2 enemy aircraft during 1 sortie. This officer has set a praiseworthy example.

— London Gazette, No. 36140, 20 August 1943

In September, Mellersh was repatriated to the United Kingdom for a rest period. He briefly performed instructing duties at No. 63 OTU before he was posted to the Fighter Interception Unit (FIU). Stationed at Ford, the FIU was a development unit for night fighter equipment and tactics, and often carried out operational sorties for testing purposes. Mellersh was posted to No. 96 Squadron, also at Ford, in June 1944. The squadron, equipped with de Havilland Mosquito heavy fighters, was one of those involved in Operation Diver, the RAF's campaign against the V-1 flying bombs that had begun to be launched against England that month. Mellersh destroyed his first V-1 on 20 June and over the next three months went on to shoot down or otherwise destroy at least 38 more, including at least seven, possibly nine, in one sortie carried out on 3 August. An award of a Bar to Mellersh's DFC was announced in The London Gazette on 3 October; the published citation read:

This officer has proved himself, to be a night fighter pilot of outstanding ability and determination and his skill and keenness have set an excellent example. Flight Lieutenant Mellersh has completed many sorties and has destroyed eight enemy aircraft; he has also destroyed a large number of flying bombs.

— London Gazette, No. 36728, 3 October 1944

No. 96 Squadron was disbanded in December, with Mellersh, promoted to flight lieutenant, going to the successor to the FIU, the Fighter Interception Development Squadron (FIDS), based at Wittering. He still flew operationally and on the night of 11 April 1945, destroyed a Ju 88 to the north of Berlin. This was one of two aerial victories to be credited to a pilot of FIDS.

== Postwar period ==
Mellersh chose to remain in the RAF in the postwar period, being granted a permanent commission as a flight lieutenant. He was an instructor at the Officers Advanced Training School at Digby and then, as an acting squadron leader, was posted back to No. 600 Squadron in May 1946, which had been reformed as part of the Auxiliary Air Force. Promoted to squadron leader in July 1950, Mellersh was given command of the University Air Squadron at Belfast for six months.

In 1952, Mellersh was posted to Egypt as a staff officer at the headquarters of the Middle East Air Force where he served until returning to the United Kingdom for training on the Gloster Meteor jet fighter. He then returned to his former unit, No. 29 Squadron, to command a flight there. In July 1956, Mellersh was promoted to wing commander and given command of No. 153 Squadron, stationed at West Malling as a night fighter unit with its Meteors. He went onto the teaching staff at the RAF Staff College the following year. In 1959 he served on the staff of the Chief of Defence Staff.

In 1961, Mellersh was promoted to group captain and appointed Deputy Director of Fighter Operations, serving in this capacity for two years. He undertook refresher training on the Gloster Javelin and Hawker Hunter jet fighters before, in 1965, being given command of the RAF station at West Raynham. After two years he moved to Supreme Headquarters Allied Powers Europe as a staff officer. In 1970 he was appointed the Senior Air Staff Officer at the RAF headquarters in Germany. On 1 July 1972, Mellersh was promoted to air vice-marshal. He took up an appointment as the Assistant Chief of the Defence Staff, with responsibility for operations. In October 1974, Mellersh was appointed to Training Command as Air Officer, Flying and Officer Training, succeeding Air Vice-Marshal P. Williamson.

== Later life ==
Mellersh retired from the RAF in early 1977 and later that year, in the 1977 Silver Jubilee and Birthday Honours, Mellersh was appointed a Companion of the Order of the Bath. Retiring to Harrington, in Kent, he died of cancer of the oesophagus in 1996. He is credited with the shooting down of eight aircraft, and the probable destruction of a ninth. He is also credited with the destruction of 39 to 42 V-1 flying bombs, and damaging two others.
