= Humphrey Edwardes-Jones =

Royal Air Force Air Marshal (1905-1987)

Sir Humphrey Edwardes-Jones
- Born: 15 August 1905
- Died: 19 January 1987 (aged 81)
- Military career
- Allegiance: United Kingdom
- Branch: Royal Air Force
- Service years: 1925–61
- Rank: Air Marshal
- Nickname: "EJ"
- Commands: RAF Germany (1959–61); School of Land/Air Warfare (1955–57); No. 210 Group (1943–45); No. 323 Wing (1942–43); Exeter Sector (1942); No. 17 Squadron (1940); No. 213 Squadron (1937–40)
- Conflicts: Second World War
- Awards: Knight Commander of the Order of the Bath; Commander of the Order of the British Empire; Distinguished Flying Cross; Air Force Cross; Mentioned in dispatches Commander of the Legion of Honour (France); Croix de guerre (France)

Air Marshal Sir John Humphrey Edwardes-Jones, KCB, CBE, DFC, AFC (15 August 1905 – 19 January 1987) was a senior Royal Air Force commander.

== RAF career ==
Educated at Brighton College and Pembroke College, Cambridge, Edwardes-Jones joined the Royal Air Force in 1925. He was appointed Officer Commanding No. 213 Squadron in 1937 and in that role advised the Air Ministry on the air operability of the Spitfire. He served in the Second World War in that capacity and then as Officer Commanding No. 17 Squadron before leading a series of training units. He continued his war service as Officer Commanding Exeter Sector and then as Commander of No. 323 Wing in Algiers before being made Air Officer Commanding No. 210 Group in Algiers in 1943 and becoming deputy director of operations at Headquarters Mediterranean Allied Air Forces in May 1945.

After the war he became Director of Plans at the Air Ministry in 1951 and then Senior Air Staff Officer at Headquarters Second Tactical Air Force in 1952. He went on to be Commandant at the School of Land/Air Warfare in 1955 and Commander-in-Chief of Second Tactical Air Force in 1957. He was made Commander-in-Chief of RAF Germany while still remaining Commander-in-Chief of Second Tactical Air Force in 1959 before retiring in 1961.

In 1978 he became Chairman of the International Wine & Spirit Competition.

Military offices
New post	Commander-in-Chief RAF Germany; Also Commander of the Second Tactical Air Force; 1959–1961	Succeeded by Sir John Grandy
