= Ronald Graham (RAF officer) =

Scottish First World War flying ace

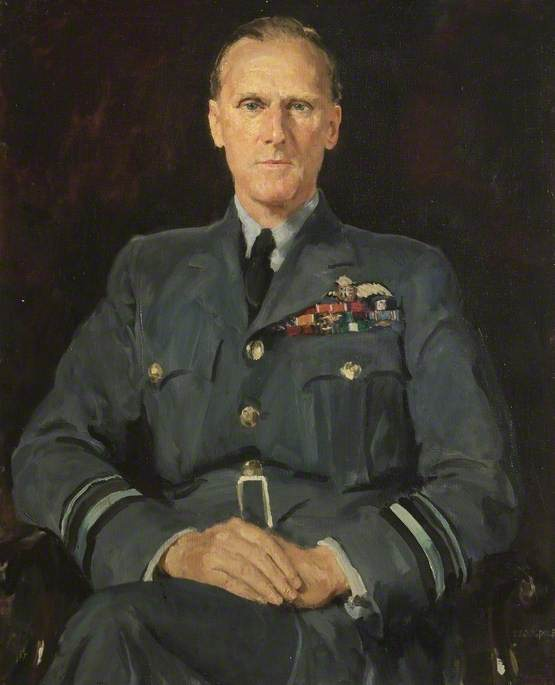
- Graham in 1945, by Thomas Cantrell Dugdale
- Born: 19 July 1896; Yokohama, Japan
- Died: 23 June 1967 (aged 70); Sannox, Isle of Arran, Scotland
- Military career
- Allegiance: United Kingdom
- Branch: Royal Navy (1915–18); Royal Air Force (1918–48)
- Service years: 1915–48
- Rank: Air vice-marshal
- Units: Seaplane Defence Flight; No. 13 Squadron RNAS
- Commands: RAF Staff College, Bracknell (1945); RAF Staff College, Bulstrode Park (1944–45); AHQ West Africa (1944); RAF Kenley (1930); No. 233 Squadron (1918–19); No. 213 Squadron (1918); Seaplane Defence Flight (1917–18)
- Conflicts: First World War; Second World War
- Awards: Companion of the Order of the Bath; Commander of the Order of the British Empire; Distinguished Service Order; Distinguished Service Cross & Bar; Distinguished Flying Cross; Mentioned in Despatches; Knight of the Legion of Honour (France); Croix de guerre (France); Officer of the Order of the Crown (Belgium)
- Other work: Commandant of the Scottish Police College

Air Vice-Marshal Ronald Graham, CB, CBE, DSO, DSC & Bar, DFC (19 July 1896 – 23 June 1967) was a Scottish First World War flying ace of the Royal Naval Air Service. Remaining in the Royal Air Force after that war, he rose to the rank of air vice marshal during the Second World War.

== First World War ==
Graham was a medical student when the First World War began. In 1915, he joined the Royal Naval Division. In September, he pulled a lateral transfer into the Royal Naval Air Service as a flight sub-lieutenant. In 1916, he served at the Dover Seaplane Base. He then moved to Dunkirk, flying cover for the North Sea Fleet. During this time, he was forced into landing in the sea on two occasions. He became part of the Saint Pol Seaplane Defence Flight, which formed on 30 June 1917. Graham tallied his first two victories at this time, destroying a German seaplane on 19 June while piloting a Sopwith Baby, and another while piloting a Sopwith Pup on 12 August 1917; the latter was shared with Leonard Slatter.

His unit morphed into No. 13 Squadron RNAS, sometimes referred to as 13 Naval Squadron. He switched to Sopwith Camels for his next three victories. He shared number three with Slatter, on 15 September, and destroyed two more, one each on 25 September and 19 October 1917. Then, on 29 December, while showboating for his nurse girlfriend, he crashed and seriously injured himself. After his convalescence, he returned to his squadron, which was now No. 213 Squadron RAF, and took command in May 1918. In August 1918 he took command of the newly formed No.233 Squadron RAF which had a Fighter Defence Flight of Camels at RAF Walmer under the command of Captain W. M. Alexander, another Flight (491)at Dover (Guston Road)and the Seaplane flight (407) Dover, Marine Parade. In March 1919 the Squadron moved its headquarters to RAF Walmer. In total he was credited with five aerial victories.

== Second World War ==
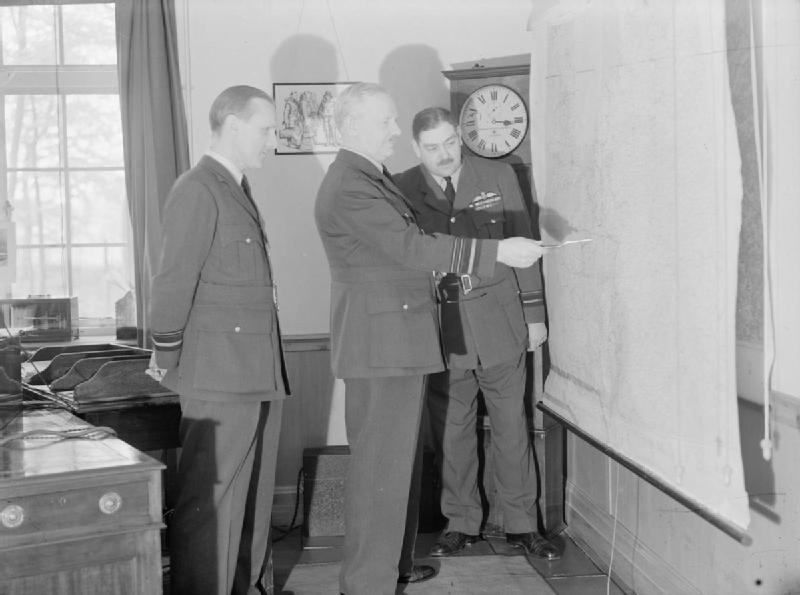
Graham (left), the Air Officer Administration at BCHQ, studying a map of Germany with Arthur Harris and Air Vice Marshal Robert Saundby

On the outbreak of the Second World War, Graham was an air commodore on the staff at the headquarters of Fighter Command.

== Award citations ==
Distinguished Service Cross
Flight Sub-Lieutenant Ronald Grahame, R.N.A.S.

"For exceptional gallantry in attacking and beating off four enemy seaplanes whilst on escort duty off the Belgian coast on the 22nd September, 1916."

Bar to the Distinguished Service Cross

Flight Lieutenant Ronald Grahame, D.S.C., R.N.A.S.

For conspicuous gallantry during raids on the seaplane station at Zeebrugge. On one occasion he descended to 600 feet, and on another occasion to 300 feet, before releasing his bombs.

Distinguished Service Order
Acting Flight Lieutenant-Commander Ronald Graham, D.S.C., R.N.A.S

For conspicuous gallantry and devotion to duty in air fights and bombing raids. Since the award of a bar to the Distinguished Service Cross, Act. Flt. Cdr. Graham has carried out five night bombing raids, and attacked and brought down three enemy seaplanes. On one occasion he ascended at night for the purpose of attacking hostile machines, notwithstanding the fact that he had only returned a few hours previously from a successful action with hostile aircraft in superior numbers. He has always displayed remarkable skill and courage.

== Notes ==
Military offices
Preceded by John Cole-Hamilton	Air Officer Commanding AHQ West Africa; January – December 1944	Succeeded by George Reid
Preceded by Charles Medhurst	Commandant of the RAF Staff College, Bulstrode Park; December 1944 – July 1945	Succeeded by Francis Mellersh
New title	Commandant of the RAF Staff College, Bracknell; July – December 1945	Succeeded by Arthur Sanders
