= Daniel Murray Bayne Galbraith =

- Born: 27 April 1895; Carleton Place, Ontario, Canada
- Died: 29 March 1921 (aged 25)
- Military career
- Allegiance: Canada; United Kingdom
- Branch: Royal Naval Air Service; Canadian Air Force
- Rank: Captain
- Nickname: Nigger
- Units: No. 1 Naval Wing; No. 8 Squadron RNAS
- Awards: Distinguished Service Cross with Bar; French Croix de Guerre

Captain Daniel Murray Bayne "Nigger" Galbraith DSC* was an early World War I flying ace credited with six aerial victories.

Galbraith was the son of R. A. Galbraith. The younger Galbraith was a student at Saint Andrews College in Toronto when World War I started. Accompanied by his friends Roy Brown and Stearne Edwards he trained to fly at a private school in the United States. Galbraith earned Aero Club of America certificate no. 356 on 3 November 1915. He joined the Royal Naval Air Service and was stationed at Dover Seaplane Base on 29 May 1916. Shortly thereafter, on 12 June, he was sent to 1 Naval Wing. Three days later, while flying a Nieuport fighter, he flamed a German seaplane. He destroyed another on 28 September, before switching to the newly formed 8 Naval Squadron and its Sopwith Pups. He added four more wins in a month, from 22 October to 23 November 1916. He was withdrawn from combat for a rest on 1 December. After a spell as an instructor, he flew anti-submarine patrols in Italy in 1918.

He joined the Canadian Air Force after the war; however, he was killed in an auto accident on 29 March 1921.

== Honors and awards ==
Distinguished Service Cross (DSC)

Flight Sub-Lieutenant Daniel Murray Boyne Galbraith, R.N.A.S. In recognition of his services in attacking a large enemy two-seater seaplane on 28 September 1916. Flight Sub-Lieutenant Galbraith's machine was severely damaged by gun-fire from the enemy machine, which finally blew up in the air.

Distinguished Service Cross (DSC) Bar

Flight Lieut. Daniel Murray Boyne Galbraith, D.S.C., R.N.A.S.

For conspicuous gallantry. On 23 November 1916, he attacked single-handed a formation of six hostile aircraft, no other allied machines being in the vicinity. One hostile machine was shot down, a second was driven down under control, and the remaining four machines then gave up the fight and landed.

In several other combats in the air Flight Lieutenant Galbraith has displayed exceptional gallantry, particularly on 10 and 16 November 1916, on each of which days he successfully engaged and shot down an enemy machine.
