= Oliver Redgate (cricketer) =

English cricketer

Oliver Redgate (16 February 1863 – 11 February 1913) was an English first-class cricketer who played for Nottinghamshire in a dozen matches between 1889 and 1894. He was born in Lenton; died in Sherwood.

His son was the First World War flying ace Oliver William Redgate, (1898–1929).
