= Jeffery Day =

American World War I flying ace

Miles Jeffery Game Day
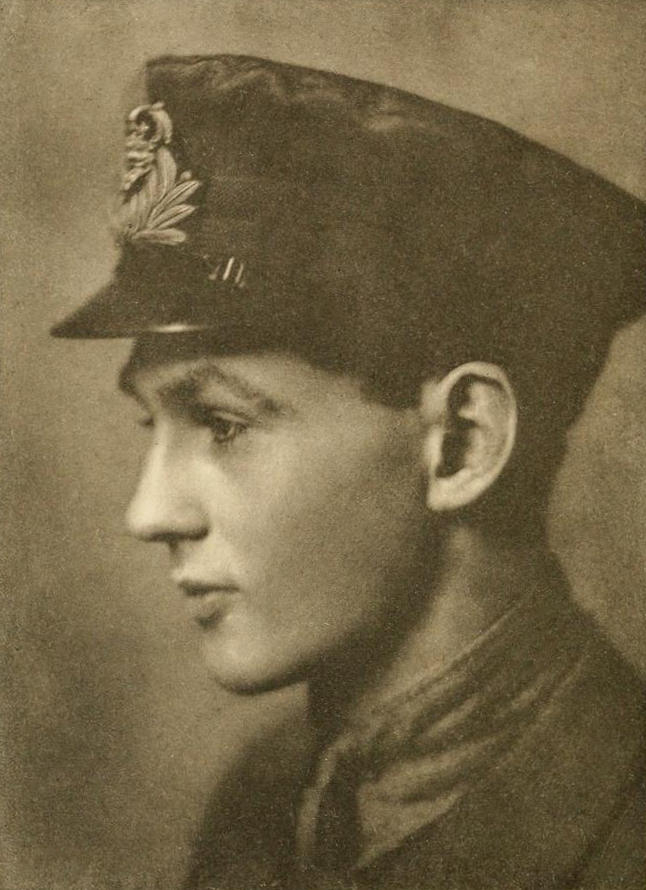
- Born: 1 December 1896; St. Ives, Huntingdonshire, England
- Died: 27 February 1918 (aged 21); West of Dunkirk, France
- Burial place: Chatham Naval Memorial, Kent, England
- Military career
- Allegiance: United Kingdom
- Branch: Royal Navy
- Service years: 1915–1918
- Rank: Flight Commander
- Units: HMS Vindex; HMS Cassandra; No. 13 Squadron RNAS
- Awards: Distinguished Service Cross

Flight Commander Miles Jeffery Game Day DSC, (1 December 1896 – 27 February 1918) was a World War I flying ace credited with five aerial victories, and also a war poet.

== Background and education ==
Jeffery Day, as he was commonly known, was born in St. Ives, Huntingdonshire, one of four children born to George Dennis Day (1860–1945), a solicitor, and his wife Margaret Jane (née Davis) (1862–1945). He was educated at Sandroyd and Repton Schools.

== Military career ==
Day joined the Royal Navy as a probationary flight sub-lieutenant, and was confirmed in the rank of flight sub-lieutenant on 21 August 1915. He received the Royal Aero Club Aviators' Certificate No. 1949 after flying a Caudron biplane at the Royal Naval Flying School, Eastchurch, on 2 October 1915.

He was first stationed aboard the seaplane carrier Vindex, part of the Harwich Force, where he gained a reputation as a skilled and daring flyer, and was promoted to flight lieutenant on 31 December 1916. Day chafed at the lack of activity at Harwich, and gained a transfer to the light cruiser Cassandra. Following her grounding in August 1917, he was posted to the experimental air station at RNAS Kingsnorth on the Isle of Grain.

Day was already an experienced pilot when he joined No. 13 Squadron RNAS, based at Dunkirk, on 19 December 1917. Between 3 January and 19 February 1918 he scored five victories while flying a Sopwith Camel. On 27 February, he was shot down in flames into the sea about 25 miles west of Dunkirk by a German seaplane.

According to his commanding officer's report:

"...He was shot down by six German aircraft which he attacked single-handed, out to sea. He had out-distanced his flight, I think because he wished to break the [enemy's] formation, in order to make it easier for the less experienced people behind him to attack. He hit the enemy and they hit his machine, which burst into flames; but, not a bit flurried, he nose-dived, flattened out, and landed perfectly on the water. He climbed out of his machine and waved his fellow-pilots back to their base; being in aeroplanes [not sea-planes] they could not assist him."

A search was immediately launched, but no trace of him was found. Having no known grave, he is commemorated on the Chatham Naval Memorial, Kent, England.

== Honours and awards ==
Distinguished Service Cross
Flight Lieutenant (acting Flight Commander) Miles Jeffrey Game Day, RNAS (since killed).
For great skill and bravery as a fighting pilot. On 25 January he attacked, single-handed, six enemy triplanes, one of which he shot down. On 2 February 1918 he attacked and destroyed an enemy two-seater machine on reconnaissance at 18,000 feet. He destroyed several enemy machines in a short space of time, and, in addition, had numerous indecisive engagements.

== Poetry ==
Day began writing poetry during his spare time, initially humorous verses for his fellow officers in the style of W. S. Gilbert, but later, inspired by Rupert Brooke's The Old Vicarage, Grantchester, he began to compose longer serious poems. Only three of these; "On the Wings of the Morning", "An Airman's Dream" and part of "To My Brother", were published in his lifetime, the first in Cornhill, and the other two in The Spectator. "To My Brother" was inspired by the death of his older brother Dennis Ivor Day, who was serving as a second lieutenant in the Royal Field Artillery when he was shot by a sniper at Vermelles on 25 September 1915, finally dying from the injury on 7 October.

Day's collected poems were published post-war, and two of his poems were anthologized in A Treasury of War Poetry, British and American Poems of the World War, 1914-1919, edited by George Herbert Clarke, and also in Cambridge Poets 1914-1920: an Anthology, compiled by Edward Davison, published in 1920.

== Bibliography ==
- Day, Jeffery (1919). Poems and Rhymes. London: Sidgwick & Jackson, Ltd.
