= No. 213 Squadron RAF =

Defunct flying squadron of the Royal Air Force

No. 213 (Ceylon) Squadron RAF
- Active: 1 April 1918 - 31 December 1919; 8 March 1937 - 30 September 1954; 1 September 1955 – 31 December 1969
- Country: United Kingdom
- Branch: Royal Air Force
- Nickname: The Hornets (1918); Ceylon
- Mottos: Irritatus Lacessit Crabro; Latin: "The Hornet Attacks When Roused"
- Battle honours: Western Front 1914-1948*; Channel and North Sea 1939-1940; France and the Low Countries 1939-1940*; Dunkirk*; Battle of Britain 1940*; Home defence 1940-1945; Egypt and Libya 1940-1943*; Syria 1941*; El Alamein*; Mediterranean 1942-1943; South East Europe 1942-1945*; Honours marked with an asterisk are emblazoned on the Squadron Standard

Insignia
- Squadron Badge: A Hornet
- Squadron Codes: AK (Apr 1939 - Jan 1950)

No. 213 Squadron was a squadron of the Royal Air Force. The squadron was formed on 1 April 1918 from No. 13 (Naval) Squadron of the Royal Naval Air Service. This RNAS squadron was itself formed on 15 January 1918 from the Seaplane Defence Flight which, since its creation in June 1917, had had the task of defending the seaplanes which flew out of Dunkirk.

== History ==
=== World War I ===
Formed originally from the Seaplane Defence Flight, which was itself founded in June 1917 at Dunkirk, it was reorganized as No. 13 Squadron RNAS on 15 January 1918. As the SDF, it operated Sopwith Pups. When the Royal Naval Air Service merged with the Royal Flying Corps to form the Royal Air Force, it was renumbered as 213 Squadron. In this incarnation, it flew Sopwith Baby floatplanes and transitioned to Sopwith Camels. It was during this time that the squadron derived its Hornet insignia and motto for the squadron badge, after overhearing a Belgian General refer to the squadron's defence of his trenches, "Like angry hornets attacking the enemy aircraft". The Hornet became affectionately known as "Crabro," Latin for hornet. The squadron's official motto became, "Irritatus Lacessit Crabro" (The Hornet Attacks When Roused). In March 1919 the squadron went back to the UK where it disbanded on 31 December 1919.

During its wartime existence, the squadron had 14 flying aces serve with it, including such notables as; John Edmund Greene, Colin Brown, George Chisholm MacKay, Leonard Slatter, Maurice Cooper, Miles Day, Ronald Graham, John Paynter, John Pinder, and George Stacey Hodson.

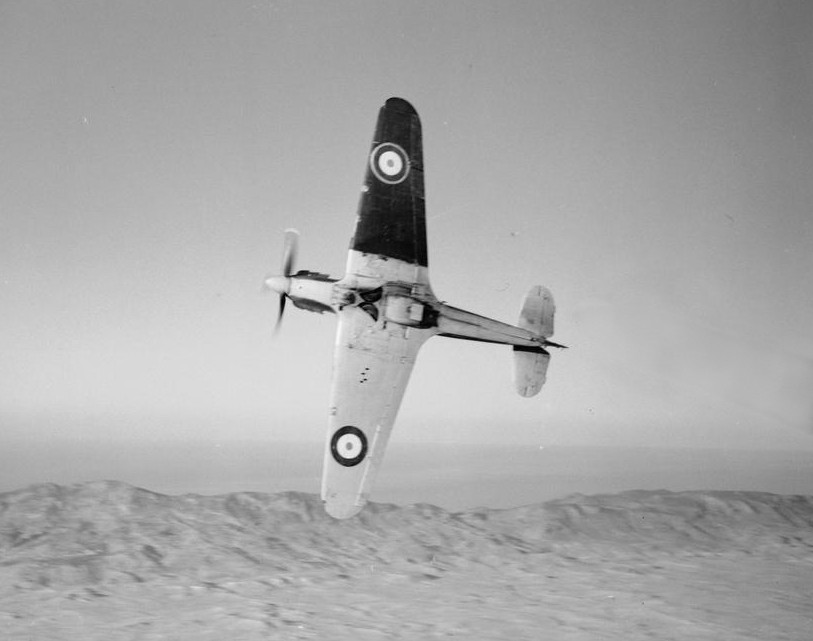
A 213 Sqn Hurricane I over Cyprus, circa 1941.

=== Second World War ===
The squadron was reformed on 8 March 1937 flying Gloster Gauntlet IIs, converting to Hawker Hurricanes in January 1939 and flew throughout the war. It participated as part of the British Expeditionary Force; then at Dunkirk; the Battle of Britain and finally in the Middle East as part of the Desert Air Force. It also flew Supermarine Spitfires and North American Mustangs.

=== Post-Second World War ===
After the war, the squadron remained in the Middle East, first flying Hawker Tempests and then de Havilland Vampires. It was stationed at Deversoir in the Suez Canal Zone from October 1948 till its disbandment there on 30 September 1954. On January 7,1949 a Hawker Tempest flown by Pilot Officer David Tattersfield was shot down by IDF Spitfires and Tattersfield was killed.

=== With Bomber Command to RAF Germany ===
The squadron reformed once again on 1 September 1955 as an English Electric Canberra squadron, specialising in strike/interdiction roles. It was the only squadron to fly the Canberra B(I).6 variant, still with the "Crabro" insignia adorning the tail fin, first from RAF Ahlhorn and later from RAF Bruggen, while a detachment was for a short time in 1956 stationed at Valkenburg Naval Air Base in the Netherlands. The squadron finally disbanded on 31 December 1969.

== Aircraft operated ==
Aircraft of 213 Squadron
From	To	Aircraft	Version
April 1918	December 1919	Camel	F1
March 1937	February 1939	Gauntlet	Mk.II
January 1939	February 1942	Hurricane	Mk.I
August 1941	March 1944	Hurricane	Mks.IIa, IIc
February 1944	May 1944	Spitfire	Mk.Vc
February 1944	June 1944	Spitfire	Mk.IX
May 1944	February 1947	Mustang	Mk.III
February 1945	February 1947	Mustang	Mk.IV
January 1947	January 1950	Tempest	F.6
November 1949	April 1952	Vampire	FB.5
April 1952	September 1954	Vampire	FB.9
March 1956	December 1969	Canberra	B(I).6

== Commanding officers ==
Commanding Officers of 213 Squadron
From	To	Name
3 July 1917	21 November 1918	S/Cdr. R. Graham
21 November 1918	31 December 1919	Maj. A.G. Tayler
3 May 1937	27 May 1940	S/Ldr. J.H. Edwardes Jones
27 May 1940	25 August 1940	S/Ldr. H. McGregor, DSO
25 August 1940	14 November 1941	S/Ldr. D.S. MacDonald
14 November 1941	16 January 1942	S/Ldr. R. Lockhart
16 January 1942	18 May 1942	S/Ldr. G.V.W. Kettlewell
18 May 1942	12 October 1942	S/Ldr. M.H. Young, DFC
12 October 1942	1 January 1943	S/Ldr. P. Olver
1 January 1943	24 August 1943	S/Ldr. V.C. Woodward, DFC
24 August 1943	16 September 1944	S/Ldr. S.R. Whiting, DFC
16 September 1944	17 December 1944	S/Ldr. C.S. Vos, DFC
17 December 1944	17 January 1946	S/Ldr. P.E. Vaughan-Fowler, DFC & Bar
17 January 1946	4 November 1946	S/Ldr. R.S. Nash, DFC
4 November 1946	2 January 1947	S/Ldr. M.C. Wells
2 January 1947	18 March 1948	S/Ldr. D.C. Colebrook
18 March 1948	18 April 1949	S/Ldr. P.J. Kelley, DFC
18 April 1949	14 September 1951	S/Ldr. D.J.A. Roe, DSO, DFC
14 September 1951	31 March 1954	S/Ldr. D.M. Finn, DFC
31 March 1954	30 September 1954	S/Ldr. A.J.H. Kitley
1 September 1954	29 December 1957	W/Cdr. H.J. Dodson, AFC
29 December 1957	10 August 1959	W/Cdr. I.R. Campbell, AFC
10 August 1959	7 June 1961	W/Cdr. P.T. Bayley
7 June 1961	24 April 1964	W/Cdr. S. Slater, DSO, OBE, DFC & Bar
24 April 1964	13 June 1966	W/Cdr. R.H. Arscott
13 June 1966	23 May 1968	W/Cdr. T.E. Benson
23 May 1968	31 December 1969	W/Cdr. M.R.T. Chandler
