= Woumen =

Coordinates: 51°00′N 2°52′E

Woumen is a town in the sub-municipality of Diksmuide, a part of the Kingdom of Belgium. Located in the Flemish Region, West Flanders Province, on the Broeken van Esen marshlands. Woumen has a total area of 13.83 km² as of 2024. Woumen has only one major road, the N 369 (Diksmuide-Ieper).

== Demographics ==
Woumen has a population density of 96.18/km² as of 2024

Date	2011-01-01	2016-01-01	2021-01-01	2024-01-01
Population	1,339	1,328	1,312	1,330

== History ==
In 1096 Woumen was founded under the leadership of Godfrey of Bouillon and Robert II, Count of Flanders.

1139 the St. Andrew church of Wouman was founded.

In 1899 construction of the parish of Jonkershove began between Woumen and Jonkershove.

In 1953 a pumping station was added to prevent flooding. Before the pumping station most of Woumen was flooded for around 4 months in the spring.

In 1971 the territory of the parish of Jonkershove was removed from Woumen and moved into the neighboring town Houthulst.

In 1977 Woumen was included in the newly formed municipality of Diksmuide. Because of the fusion and reorginization of Belgian municipalities.

== See also ==
- West Flanders
- Diksmuide
- Belgium
