= John Edmund Greene =

- Born: 2 July 1894; Winnipeg, Manitoba
- Died: 14 October 1918 (aged 24)
- Burial place: Coxyde Military Cemetery, Koksijde, West-Vlaanderen, Belgium
- Military career
- Allegiance: George V
- Branch: Royal Naval Air Service; Royal Air Force
- Service years: 1916–1918
- Rank: Captain
- Units: No. 13 Squadron RNAS, No. 213 Squadron RAF
- Awards: Distinguished Flying Cross

John Edmund Greene DFC (2 July 1894 – 14 October 1918) was a Canadian First World War flying ace, officially credited with 15 victories. Greene was shot down by Carl Degelow on 4 October 1918, but survived to be shot down and killed 10 days later. He is buried at the Coxyde Military Cemetery (Koksijde).
