= Francis Mellersh (RAF officer) =

Royal Air Force Air Vice-Marshal (1898–1955)

Sir Francis Mellersh
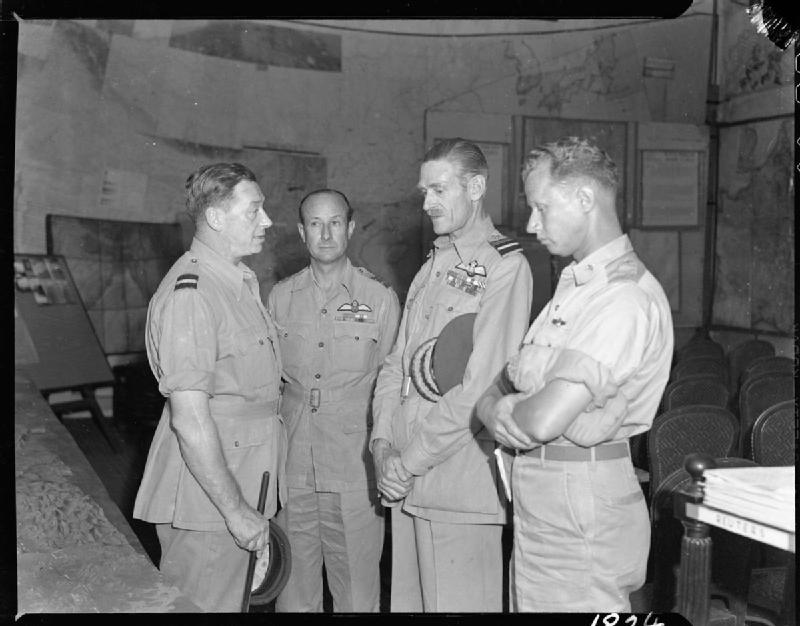
- Air Commodore Mellersh (left), Air Commander of the Strategic Air Force, in discussion with senior officers in the War Room at Headquarters Strategic Air Force, Eastern Air Command in Calcutta
- Born: 22 September 1898; Esher, Surrey
- Died: 25 May 1955 (aged 56); Itchenor, Sussex
- Relatives: Francis Richard Lee Mellersh (son)
- Military career
- Allegiance: United Kingdom
- Branch: Royal Navy (1916–18); Royal Air Force (1918–54)
- Service years: 1916–1954
- Rank: Air vice-marshal
- Nickname: Tog
- Commands: RAF Regiment (1952–54); AHQ Malaya (1949–51); No. 21 Group (1947–48); No. 91 Group (1946–47); RAF Staff College, Bulstrode Park (1945–46); No. 231 (Bomber) Group (1944); RAF Wattisham (1941–42)
- Conflicts: First World War; Second World War
- Awards: Knight Commander of the Order of the British Empire; Air Force Cross; Mentioned in Despatches (2)

Air Vice-Marshal Sir Francis John Williamson Mellersh, KBE, AFC (22 September 1898 – 25 May 1955) was a Royal Naval Air Service aviator and flying ace credited with five aerial victories during the First World War, and a senior commander in the Royal Air Force during the 1940s and 1950s. He was killed in a helicopter accident in 1955.

== First World War ==
Mellersh joined the Royal Naval Air Service in 1916. He trained as a fighter pilot and was posted to 9 Naval Squadron in 1917. While flying a Sopwith Triplane on 28 July 1917, he drove down an Aviatik C. He switched to flying a Sopwith Camel and scored victories 15 October 1917 and 12 April 1918; the latter win was shared with squadron-mate Roy Brown. On 21 April 1918, Mellersh was a flight commander involved in the dogfight that brought down the Red Baron, Manfred von Richthofen; Mellersh claimed a Fokker Dr.I triplane destroyed on that date. His last victory came two days later.

== Death ==
Mellersh disembarked from a helicopter onto a quay on 25 May 1955; he had been invited to cruise on a yacht belonging to the Itchenor Yacht Club. As the helicopter departed, one of its rotors hit the mast of a yacht. As the copter crashed, the main rotor killed Mellersh.

Military offices
Preceded by Oswald Gayford	Officer Commanding RAF Wattisham; 1941–1942	Unknown
Preceded by Howard C. Davidson	Air Commander, Strategic Air Force, Eastern Air Command; 1944–1945	Formation disbanded
Preceded by Ronald Graham	Commandant RAF Staff College, Bulstrode Park; 1945–1946	Succeeded by Dermot Boyle
Preceded by Gordon Vasse	Air Officer Commanding No. 21 Group; 1947–1948	Succeeded by Cecil Bouchier
Preceded by Stephen Strafford	Commandant-General of the RAF Regiment; 1952–1954	Succeeded by Brian Yarde
