= Wenduine =

- Municipality
- Coat of arms
- Interactive map of Wenduine
- Location in Belgium
- Coordinates: 51°18′N 3°5′E
- Country: Belgium
- Community: Flemish Community
- Region: Flemish Region
- Province: West Flanders

Area
  - Total: 833 km^{2} (322 sq mi)

Population (1972)
  - Total: 2,000
  - Density: 2.4/km^{2} (6.2/sq mi)
- Postal codes: 8420
- NIS code: 35029(C)

Wenduine is a seaside resort on the Belgian North Sea coast. It is a village with a population of 4,000 inhabitants in the West-Flemish municipality of De Haan.

Wenduine is served by the Kusttram (Coastal tram) which traverses the entire Belgian coast.

== History ==
A Gallo-Roman settlement was discovered in this area, but this habitation disappeared around 270 after raids by Germanic pirates and flooding of the coastal plain. Habitation is said to have arisen again in the 8th century by Frankish colonists who practiced fishing. The first reclamations took place in the 10th century and, in addition to Wenduine, the villages of Vlissegem and Klemskerke also emerged.

Wenduine initially fell under the parish of Uitkerke, in 1135 there was said to have been an auxiliary church of Uitkerke in Wenduine. In 1185 the parish was founded and the first written mention of Weinduna was made. The meaning of this name is subject to speculation.

In the 11th century, mainly sheep farmers are said to have lived in Wenduine. In the 12th century fishing and later, the cloth industry were also practiced. In the 13th and 14th centuries, Wenduine was important as a fishing town, in 1335 there was already a port, and in 1340 fishermen were allowed to catch porpoise. The harpooned porpoise in the Wenduine coat of arms is a reminder of this. A fishing guild was founded around 1350.

In the 15th century there were storm surges and in response the Graaf Jansdijk was constructed. Villages such as Tarninge and Mosselinge disappeared either due to floods or drifting sand. In 1467 there were already fishing vessels sailing as far as the Shetland Islands. The Flemish Revolt against Maximilian led to the end of the cloth industry (1488).

From the mid-16th century, fishing fell into decline. The religious troubles were partly to blame for this. Wenduine fell back into an agricultural village. Around 1796 Wenduine became an independent municipality that, however, experienced little prosperity. In 1884, a paved road was built to Blankenberge, which was already a seaside resort at the time. A sanatorium had already been built in 1878, called Hospices Maritimes. The Home du Grand Air, a convalescent home for poor children, followed in 1896. In 1900, the Sisters of the Infancy of Mary followed with a convent, a girls' school and, in 1910, the Home Notre-Dame du Sacré-Coeur, also a convalescent home.

There had been talk of a seaside resort since 1886. It was then that Wenduine really became accessible, because the steam tram line Ostend-Bredene (village)-Den Haan-Wenduine-Blankenberge then started running. Villa construction started in 1888 and a hotel, the Pavillon des Dunes, followed in 1895. A traffic boulevard was built in the north (1895–1897) and in 1900 the Prince Albert Park. From 1902 onwards, an urbanization plan was implemented, in which a central roundabout was constructed, the Astridplein, today with tennis and mini golf. After delays due to the First World War, the plan was finalized in 1924. The tram line later became electric and is now the modern Coastal Tram. The route through Wenduine has not changed in all these years, and there have been no other rail lines.[1]

The Villa Maritiem sanatorium was built in 1903. The Molenhoek district was built in the 1920s and the Manitoba district, the Neptunus district and the Steenoven district followed in the 2nd half of the 20th century, all located in the polder area.

The character of the seaside resort changed in the late 1930s. From a fashionable seaside resort it became more of a holiday destination for wider sections of the population. Many hotels disappeared or were converted into apartment complexes.

In 1977, Wenduine was included in the merged municipality of De Haan. See also Harendijke.

Wenduine has one bus line to Bruges; Line 49 since 2024. Previously this was bus line 31 and before that 790.[2] Belbus 36 serves the area, but not the centre.

== Demographic development ==
Historical population

Year	Pop.	±%
1831	222	—
1846	256	+15.3%
1856	255	−0.4%
1866	293	+14.9%
1880	313	+6.8%

Year	Pop.	±%
1890	323	+3.2%
1900	448	+38.7%
1910	856	+91.1%
1920	1,021	+19.3%
1930	1,177	+15.3%

Year	Pop.	±%
1947	1,571	+33.5%
1961	1,800	+14.6%
1970	1,930	+7.2%
1976	2,191	+13.5%

Source: NIS, Note:1831 up to and including 1970=Censuses; 1976=Population 31 December

== Nature and landscape ==
Wenduine is located on the Belgian North Sea coast. There is a sea beach, and between Wenduine and De Haan the Duinbossen area consists of wooded dune areas. South of there you will find the Zandpanne nature reserve. The Kleiputten van Wenduine nature reserve is located east of Wenduine.

== Annual events ==
- Sea consecration (Pentecost Monday)
- Giant festivals (2nd weekend of July, giants Louw, Wanne and Scutteman)
- Night of Wenduine (2nd week of August, evening street entertainment on the boulevard and fireworks on the beach).
- There is also the carnival, the fire brigade open day and the fair.

== Food ==
- Fish dishes
- Sinterklaas vollaard (St. Nicholas loaves)

== Images ==
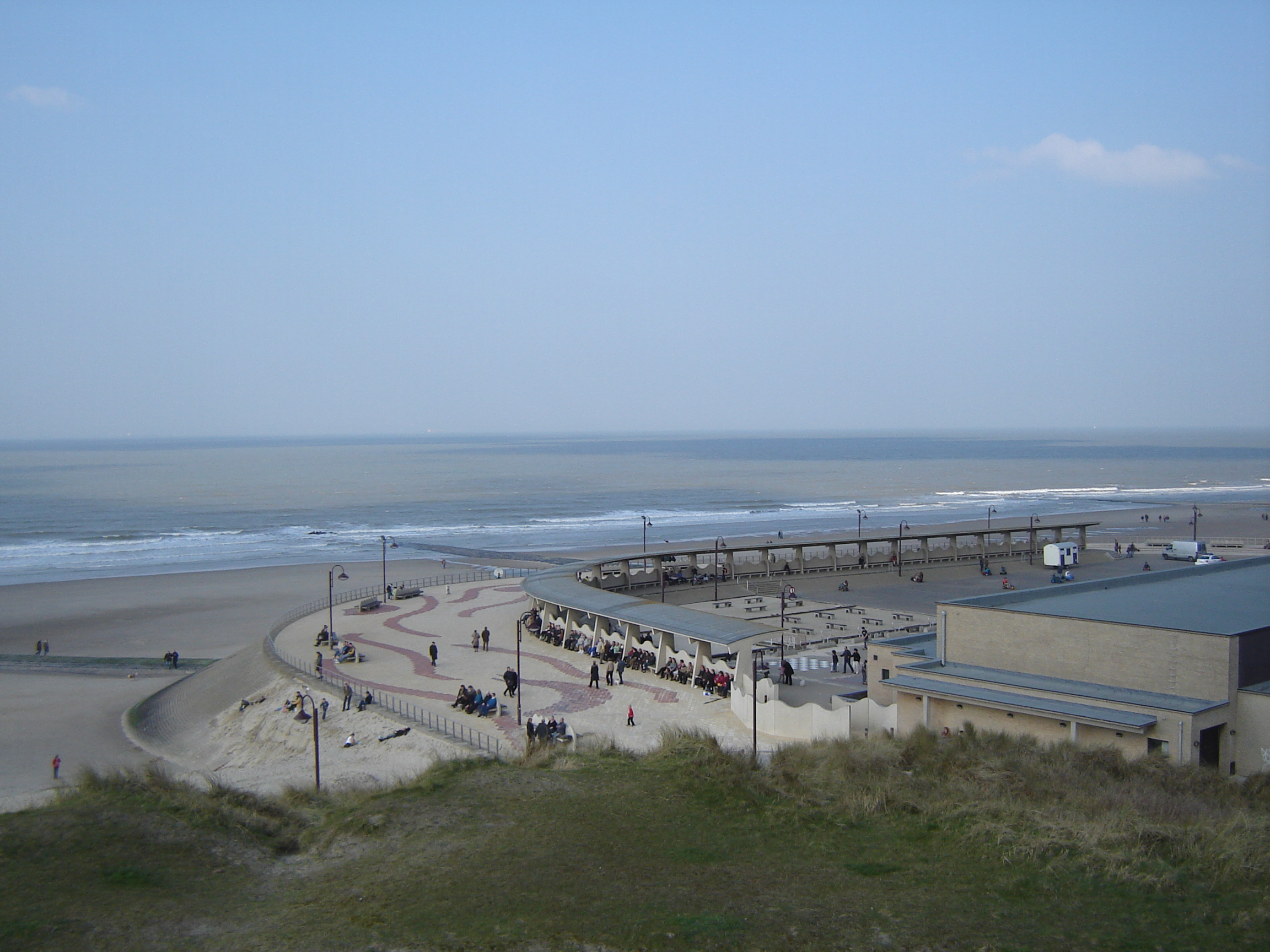
Wenduine - Zeedijk (Sea dike)

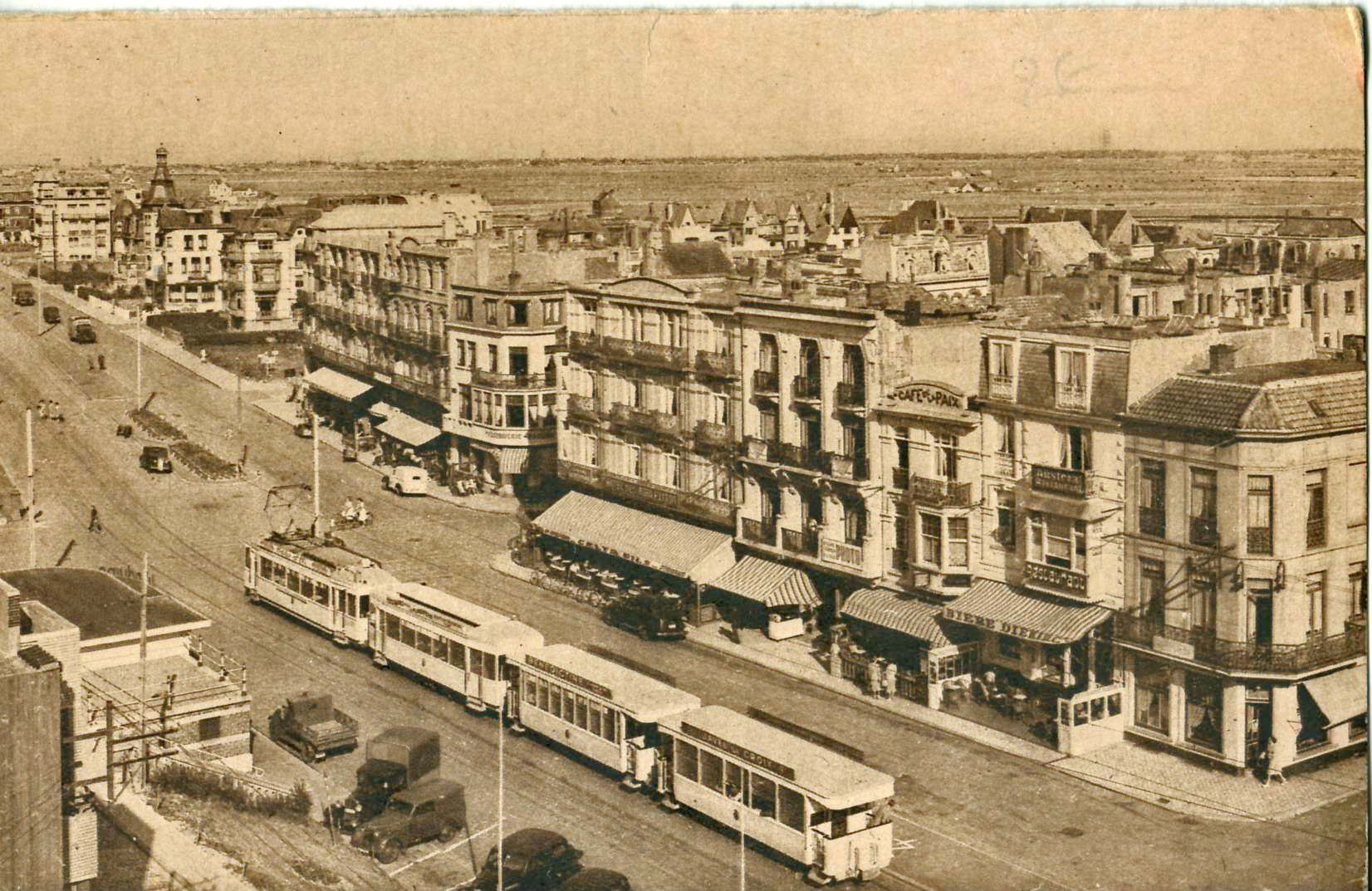
Wenduyne in the 1930s, on a French postcard

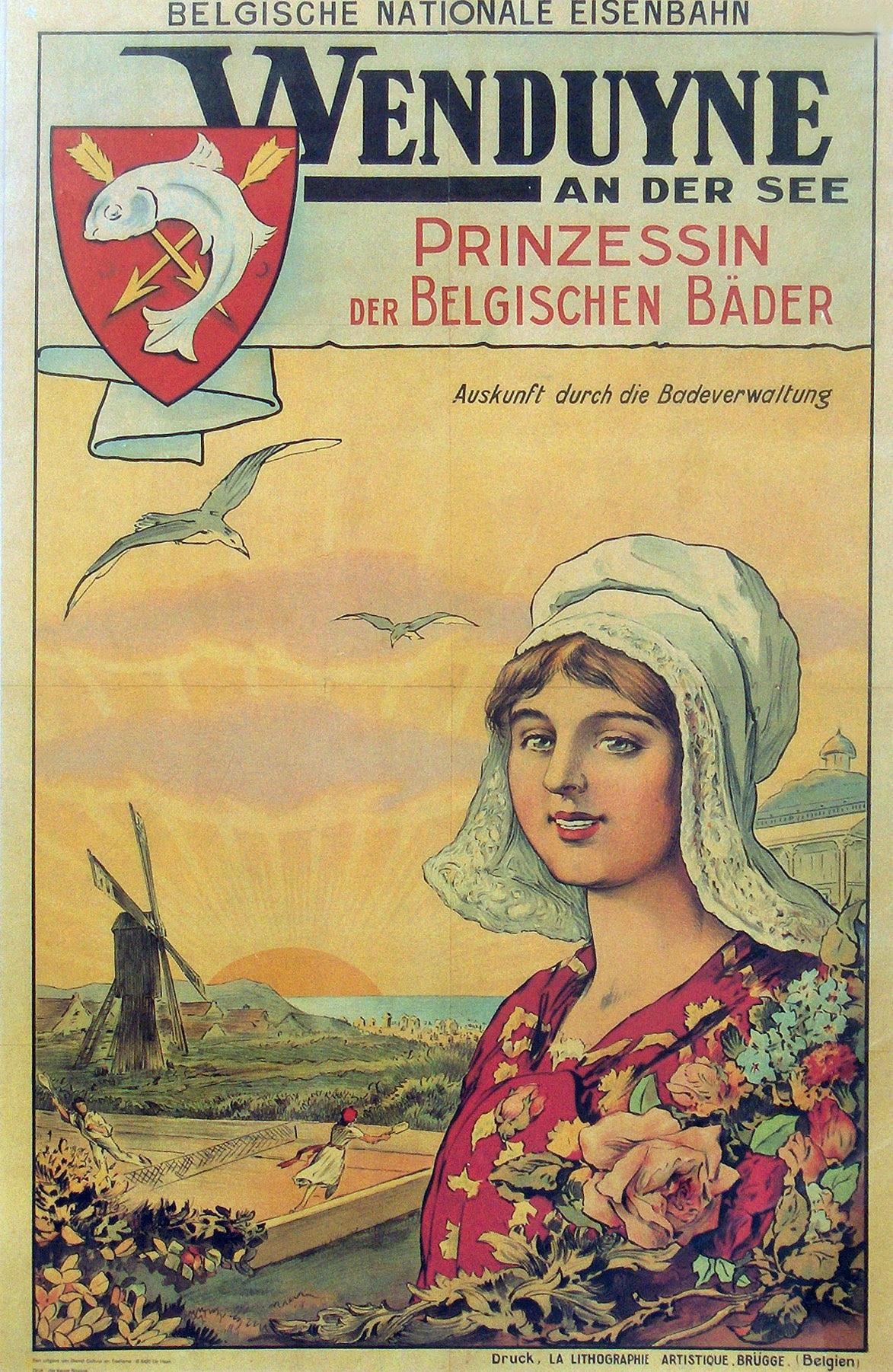
Wenduine seaside on a German language poster
