= George Chisholm MacKay =

Canadian flying ace

- Born: 17 May 1898; Sunderland, Ontario
- Died: 4 September 1973 (aged 75); Etobicoke, Ontario
- Military career
- Allegiance: George V
- Branch: Royal Naval Air Service; Royal Air Force
- Service years: 1916–1918
- Rank: Captain
- Unit: No. 13 Squad RNAS/No. 213 Squadron RAF
- Conflicts: First World War
- Awards: Distinguished Flying Cross; Order of Leopold (Belgium); Légion d'honneur (France); Croix de Guerre

George Chisholm MacKay DFC (17 May 1898 – 4 September 1973) was a Canadian First World War flying ace, officially credited with 18 victories.
