= Stearne Tighe Edwards =

Captain Stearne Tighe Edwards DSC*
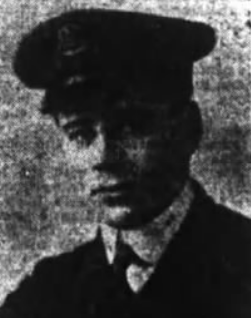
- Edwards in 1918
- Born: 13 February 1893; Franktown, Ontario, Canada
- Died: 22 November 1918 (aged 25); York, United Kingdom
- Burial place: Tadcaster
- Military career
- Allegiance: United Kingdom
- Branch: Royal Naval Air Service; Royal Air Force
- Service years: 1915–1918
- Rank: Captain
- Units: No. 3 Wing RNAS; No. 11 Squadron RNAS; No. 6 Naval Squadron RNAS; No. 9 Naval Squadron RNAS; No. 209 Squadron RAF
- Conflicts: First World War
- Awards: Distinguished Service Cross & Bar
- Other work: Civil engineer

Captain Stearne Tighe Edwards DSC & Bar (13 February 1893 – 22 November 1918) was a Canadian flying ace of the First World War, officially credited with 17 victories. He was seriously injured in a crash the day after Armistice Day, and died from his injuries 10 days later.

== Early life ==
Stearne Tighe Edwards was born on 13 February 1893 in Franktown, Ontario, the son of Edwin Edwards and Annie née Tighe. Moving to Carleton Place after the death of his father in 1912, Edwards was educated at Carleton Place High School where he won the athletics championship and played on the town ice hockey team with his friend Roy Brown. After school, Edwards became a civil engineer. By 1914 he was working in railway construction at Port Nelson, Manitoba. When the First World War began he travelled the 200 miles to Toronto to enlist.

== Military service ==
Edwards wanted to join the Royal Naval Air Service (RNAS) immediately but, as they would only accept qualified pilots, he first enrolled at the Wright Flying School in Dayton, Ohio. He travelled there by train with several friends, including Brown and Murray Galbraith, both to become successful pilots in their own rights. Edwards received his pilots license on 13 October 1915, and was then able to join the RNAS.

Sent to Britain for military training as a probationer at Chingford, he was made a temporary flight sub-lieutenant on 31 October. He was posted to No. 3 Wing RNAS on the Western Front in the following year. He was promoted to temporary flight lieutenant on 1 January 1917, and flew with No. 3 Wing until February. On 9 March he was transferred to No. 11 Squadron RNAS. He was then quickly moved again, this time to No. 6 Naval Squadron RNAS - this unit was disbanded in July, and Edwards was instead sent to No. 9 Naval Squadron RNAS.

Flying Sopwith Camels with No. 9 Naval, Edwards began to shoot down enemy aircraft in aerial combat. For this he was awarded the Distinguished Service Cross (DSC), with the citation in the London Gazette on 2 November reading:

Act. Flt Cdr. Stearne Tighe Edwards, R.N.A.S.
In recognition of his services on the following occasions:—
On the 3rd September, 1917, with his flight he attacked a two-seater Aviatik. The enemy machine was observed to go down in a vertical nose dive, and the enemy observer was seen to collapse in the cockpit.
On the 21st September, 1917, he drove a two-seater enemy machine down out of control.
On the 23rd September, 1917, he attacked an Albatross scout, which crashed into the sea.
On the same date he attacked three Albatross scouts. One got on the tail of another officer's machine at very close range, shooting him up very badly. Flt. Cdr. Edwards attacked him from above, and the enemy machine turned on its back and went down in a vertical dive. He followed the enemy machine down to 8,000 feet, when its wings came off, and it fell to the ground.

Promoted to temporary flight commander on 31 December 1917, Edwards' successes continued into 1918, bringing his total score to eight kills. On 1 April the RNAS was merged with the Royal Flying Corps (RFC) to form the Royal Air Force (RAF). No. 9 Naval became No. 209 Squadron RAF, and Edwards' kills continued to grow in number. Despite this he did not enjoy his work, with an inscription inside his prayerbook asking for forgiveness for the men he killed. With sixteen victories to his name, Edwards was awarded a bar to his DSC on 21 June. The citation read:

Lieut. (tempy. Capt.) Stearne Tighe Edwards, D.S.C., R.A.F.
For conspicuous bravery and most brilliant leadership of fighting patrols against enemy aircraft. On the 2nd May, 1918, whilst leading a patrol of four scouts, he encountered a hostile formation of eight enemy scouts, and drove down one enemy machine completely out of control. Soon afterwards he engaged another formation of six enemy scouts, driving down one to its destruction whilst his patrol accounted for another. He only broke off the fight owing to lack of ammunition. He has destroyed or driven down out of control many enemy machines since he was awarded the Distinguished Service Cross, and has at all times shown the greatest gallantry and a fine offensive spirit.

=== Death ===
Soon afterwards Edwards, exhausted after 430 hours of active service flying, was sent to hospital in England. Having successfully recuperated, he was appointed a flying instructor at No. 2 Flying Training School RAF based at Marske Aerodrome. With the Armistice of 11 November 1918 signed, on 12 November Edwards took off from RAF Tadcaster in a Sopwith Pup Scout to celebrate his survival. Watched by spectators below, the aircraft was seen to start a spin, possibly a victory roll, but Edwards pulled out of the manoeuvre too late and a wing made contact with the ground, driving the Pup Scout into the earth just on the perimeter of the airfield. Edwards survived the impact but was taken to hospital with serious head injuries.

Roy Brown led a group of friends to the hospital to cheer Edwards up. Conscious, he was able to laugh at their jokes, but his condition was poor and, having had to have a leg amputated, he died in York Military Hospital on 22 November. Brown wrote home in a letter, "He was the best friend I shall ever have and one of the best men that was ever on this Earth". Similarly impacted, Edwards' commanding officer wrote to his bereaved mother, who had relied on Edwards for her income:

The men simply worshipped him and would do anything for him, and at the same time, he ruled them with a rod of iron, but gently. In Sterne [sic] I not only lost my best officer, but my best friend.

Edwards was buried in Tadcaster Cemetery. A bronze memorial plaque to him was laid in St. James Anglican Church, Carleton Place, in 1920. The guest of honour for the unveiling was Brown who, crying, did not make a speech.
