= Oliver Redgate =

British First World War flying ace

- Born: 23 November 1898; Nottingham, England
- Died: 1929 (aged 30–31); East Leake, Nottinghamshire
- Military career
- Allegiance: United Kingdom
- Branch: Royal Navy; Royal Air Force
- Service years: 1917–1919
- Rank: Captain
- Unit: No. 9 Squadron RNAS/No. 209 Squadron RAF
- Conflicts: First World War: Western Front
- Awards: Distinguished Flying Cross

Oliver William Redgate, DFC (23 November 1898 – 1929) was a British flying ace of the First World War, credited with 16 aerial victories.

== Early life ==
Redgate was born on 23 November 1898 in Nottingham, the son of Oliver Redgate, who played cricket for Nottinghamshire, and Annie Eveline (née Clarke). He had two sisters, Arleene Annie and Ida Eveline.

== First World War ==
Redgate entered the Royal Navy on 3 January 1917 as probationary flight officer for temporary service in the Royal Naval Air Service. After initial flight training he was granted Royal Aero Club Aviator's Certificate No. 4579 after soloing a Caudron biplane at the Royal Naval Air Station at Redcar, Yorkshire, on 30 March. He was promoted to flight sub-lieutenant on 13 June, and posted to No. 9 (Naval) Squadron in northern France to fly the Sopwith Camel single-seat fighter.

Redgate scored his first victory there on 25 July 1917, driving a German reconnaissance aircraft down out of control off Westende. Redgate then had to wait until 5 September before gaining his second victory. Two more followed that month, and three in October. On 13 December 1917 he was promoted to flight lieutenant, by which time his had gained two more victories, taking his total to nine. Redgate scored only once more, on 3 February 1918, during the next three months.

On 1 April 1918, the British Army's Royal Flying Corps (RFC) and the Royal Naval Air Service (RNAS) were merged to form the Royal Air Force. The next day Redgate drove down an Albatros D.III south of Halluin, and scored three more times that month, and twice in May. On the last of these, on 15 May 1918, he sustained a leg wound serious enough to remove him from combat for the rest of the war. His final tally was nine enemy aircraft destroyed, including six shared with other pilots, and seven enemy aircraft driven down out of control, including three shared. He thereafter served in the Home Establishment until after the Armistice of 11 November 1918.

Redgate was confirmed in his rank of captain on 3 January 1919, and was transferred to the unemployed list on 17 October.

== Post-war life ==
Redgate settled in East Leake, along with his mother and sisters. He died of tuberculosis in 1929. In honour and in recognition of Oliver Redgate there is now a road in the village named after him "Redgate Close"

== Honours and awards ==
Distinguished Flying Cross

Lieutenant (Honorary Captain) William Oliver [sic] Redgate.
On an occasion during the past two months when leading an offensive patrol of five machines, he observed an enemy formation of twelve aeroplanes attacking another formation of our scouts. He at once led his patrol to the aid of our second patrol, and as he approached it two enemy scouts dived at him. By skilful piloting he placed himself behind one of these machines and, diving on it, drove it to destruction. Captain Redgate has accounted for seven enemy machines in all, and displays enterprise and courage on all occasions.

== Bibliography ==
- Franks, Norman (2003). Sopwith Camel Aces of World War I. Oxford, UK: Osprey Publishing. ISBN 978-1-84176-534-1.
