= Independence from the United Kingdom =

Independence from the United Kingdom may refer to any one of the many campaigns (both historical and current), events, documents and legislation regarding countries that have gained independence from the United Kingdom or countries which aspire to do so.

These include:

- Afghani independence:
  - Anglo-Afghan Treaty of 1919
- American independence:
  - American Revolution, during the 1770s
  - United States Declaration of Independence, 1776
  - Treaty of Paris (1783)
  - United States Constitution, 1788
- Australian independence:
  - Constitution of Australia, 1901
  - Statute of Westminster 1931
  - Statute of Westminster Adoption Act 1942
  - Australia Act 1986
- Barbadian independence
  - Barbados Independence Act 1966
- Canadian independence
  - Canadian Confederation, during the 1860s
  - Constitution Act, 1867
  - Statute of Westminster 1931
  - Canada Act 1982
- Egyptian Independence
  - Unilateral Declaration of Egyptian Independence, 1922
- Indian independence
  - Dominion of India, 1947
- Irish independence (disambiguation)
- Ghanaian Independence 1957
- Jamaican independence
  - Jamaica Independence Act 1962
- New Zealand independence
  - Declaration of the Independence of New Zealand, 1835
  - New Zealand Constitution Act 1852
  - Dominion of New Zealand, 1907
  - Statute of Westminster 1931
  - Realm of New Zealand, 1947
  - Statute of Westminster Adoption Act 1947
  - Constitution Act 1986
- Pakistan Independence
  - Dominion of Pakistan, 1947
- Scottish independence
  - Scottish independence referendum, 2014
- South African independence
  - Union of South Africa, 1910
  - Statute of Westminster 1931
  - South African Constitution of 1961
- Welsh independence

== See also ==
- Balfour Declaration of 1926
- Constitutional history of Australia
- Sue v Hill § Australian independence from the United Kingdom
- List of countries that have gained independence from the United Kingdom
