= List of countries that have gained independence from the United Kingdom =

Below are lists of the countries and territories that were formerly ruled or administered by the United Kingdom or part of the British Empire (including military occupations that did not retain the pre-war central government), with their independence days. Some countries did not gain their independence on a single date, therefore the latest day of independence is shown with a breakdown of dates further down. A total of 65 countries have claimed their independence from the British Empire/United Kingdom.

== Colonies, protectorates, and mandates ==
Country	Pre-independence name (if different)	Date of independence or first stage		Notes
Country	Pre-independence name (if different)	Day & month	Year	Notes
Afghanistan		19 August	1919	Anglo-Afghan Treaty of 1919
Antigua and Barbuda	Antigua, Leeward Islands (Note: West Indies Associated States)	1 November	1981	Antigua Termination of Association Order
The Bahamas	British Bahamas	10 July	1973	Bahamas Independence Act 1973
Bahrain	British Protectorate of Bahrain	15 August	1971	
Barbados		30 November	1966	Barbados Independence Act 1966
Belize	British Honduras	21 September	1981	September Celebrations
Botswana	Bechuanaland Protectorate	30 September	1966	Botswana Independence Act 1966
Brunei		1 January	1984	
Cyprus	British Cyprus	16 August	1960	Cyprus Independence Day is commonly celebrated on 1 October.
Dominica	Dominica, Windward Islands	3 November	1978	
Egypt	Sultanate of Egypt	28 February	1922	Control over the Suez Canal Zone was maintained until 1956.
Eswatini		6 September	1968	Initially called Swaziland, which was also its pre-independence name. Renamed Eswatini by King Mswati III in April 2018.
Fiji	Colony of Fiji	10 October	1970	
The Gambia	Gambia Colony and Protectorate	18 February	1965	
Ghana	Gold Coast, British Togoland (Togoland was absorbed into the Gold Coast in 1957.)	6 March	1957	
Grenada	Grenada, Windward Islands	7 February	1974	Independence Day (Grenada)
Guyana	British Guiana	26 May	1966	Became a republic in 1970.
India	British Raj	15 August	1947	Indian Independence Act 1947
Iraq	Mandatory Iraq	3 October	1932	Pursuant to the British Mandate for Mesopotamia
Israel	Mandatory Palestine	14 May	1948	End of British mandate on 14 May 1948; last British presence, the British exclave in Haifa, evacuated on 30 June 1948. Palestine declared independence from Israel on 15 November 1988.
Jamaica	Colony of Jamaica	6 August	1962	Independence Day (6 August)
Jordan	Emirate of Transjordan	25 May	1946	
Kenya	Kenya Colony	12 December	1963	Dominion of Kenya declared in 1963. Republic declared exactly 1 year later.
Kiribati	Gilbert and Ellice Islands	12 July	1979	
Kuwait	Emirate of Kuwait	19 June	1961	
Lesotho	Basutoland	4 October	1966	
Libya	British Military Administration (Libya)	24 December	1951	From 1943 to 1951 Libya was under the control of Britain and France. On 24 December 1951, Libya declared its independence and became the United Kingdom of Libya.
Malawi	Nyasaland	6 July	1964	Dominion of Malawi declared in 1964. Republic declared exactly 2 years later.
Malaya	British Malaya	31 August	1957	Federation of Malaya Independence Act 1957.
Maldives	Sultanate of the Maldive Islands	26 July	1965	
Malta	Crown Colony of Malta	21 September	1964	This occurred in spite of the 1956 Maltese United Kingdom integration referendum, but in accordance with the 1964 Maltese constitutional referendum.
Mauritius	British Mauritius	12 March	1968	
Myanmar	British rule in Burma	4 January	1948	Gained independence as Burma; renamed Myanmar by the military dictatorship in 1989.
Nauru		31 January	1968	Co-trustee with Australia and New Zealand; independence effected through Australian legislation (Nauru Independence Act 1967).
Nigeria	Colonial Nigeria	1 October	1960	Took in Northern Cameroons
Oman	Muscat and Oman	20 December	1970	
Pakistan	British Raj	14 August	1947	Partition of India
Palestine	Mandatory Palestine	1 October	1948	End of British mandate on 14 May 1948; the All-Palestine Protectorate, which claimed sovereignty over the entire former Mandatory Palestine, was formed on 1 October 1948. The Gaza Strip was governed by the All-Palestine Protectorate, albeit under Egyptian influence, until the All-Palestine Protectorate was dissolved in 1959 and replaced by a direct Egyptian military occupation, while the West Bank was annexed into Jordan in 1949. Both were captured by Israel in the 1967 Six-Day War. The modern State of Palestine would then declare its independence from Israel on 15 November 1988, and later gained limited autonomy as the Palestinian Authority from 1994.
Qatar	British Qatari Protectorate	3 September	1971	
Saint Lucia	St Lucia, Windward Islands	22 February	1979	
Saint Kitts and Nevis	St Kitts–Nevis and Anguilla, Leeward Islands	19 September	1983	
Saint Vincent and the Grenadines	St Vincent, Windward Islands	27 October	1979	
Seychelles		29 June	1976	
Sierra Leone	Sierra Leone Colony and Protectorate	27 April	1961	Dominion of Sierra Leone declared in 1961. Republic declared in 1971.
Solomon Islands	British Solomon Islands	7 July	1978	
Somaliland	British Somaliland	26 June	1960	The British Somaliland Protectorate gained independence on 26 June 1960 and united with the Trust Territory of Somalia on 1 July 1960 to form the Somali Republic, but later broke away and unilaterally declared independence in 1991. The second Somalilander state has limited recognition.
South Yemen	Protectorate of South Arabia; Federation of South Arabia	30 November	1967	Merged with North Yemen to form Yemen in 1990
Sri Lanka	British Ceylon	4 February	1948	Gained independence as the Dominion of Ceylon. Renamed Sri Lanka in 1972 upon being declared a republic.
Sudan	Anglo-Egyptian Sudan	1 January	1956	Termination of dual Anglo-Egyptian condominium. South Sudan then gained independence from Sudan on 9 July 2011.
Tanganyika	Tanganyika Territory	9 December	1961	Tanganyika became independent on 9 December 1961. It joined with Zanzibar on 25 April 1964 to form Tanzania.
Tonga	Kingdom of Tonga (1900–1970)	4 June	1970	
Trinidad and Tobago		31 August	1962	Independence Day (August 31)
Tuvalu	Gilbert and Ellice Islands	1 October	1978	
Uganda	Protectorate of Uganda	9 October	1962	
United Arab Emirates	Trucial States	2 December	1971	National Day (United Arab Emirates)
United States	British America (Note: The name "Thirteen Colonies" only existed in retrospect to describe those British Colonies in Mainland North America which signed the United States Declaration of Independence.)	4 July	1776	Independence declared from the Kingdom of Great Britain in 1776. British attempts to regain control by military force ceased by 1781. British government recognized independence on 3 September 1783 with the Treaty of Paris, with the last British presence evacuated on 25 November the same year.
Vanuatu	New Hebrides	30 July	1980	Independence from United Kingdom and France in 1980.
Vermont Republic	New Hampshire Grants	15 January	1777	Independence declared from the British colony of Quebec as well as from New York (which was contested between Britain and the newly-independent United States during the American Revolutionary War) and New Hampshire (which was fully under United States control). The Vermont Republic was admitted into the United States on 4 March 1791.
Zambia	Northern Rhodesia	24 October	1964	
Zanzibar		10 December	1963	Zanzibar became independent on 10 December 1963. Sultanate of Zanzibar overthrown in the Zanzibar Revolution, which created a short-lived republic. It joined with Tanganyika on 25 April 1964 to form Tanzania.
Zimbabwe	Southern Rhodesia	18 April	1980	Southern Rhodesia declared independence from United Kingdom on 11 November 1965 as Rhodesia, which was not internationally recognized. Rhodesia transitioned to majority rule as Zimbabwe-Rhodesia on 1 June 1979 with a view to eventual international recognition, but instead returned to British control under the Lancaster House Agreement followed by internationally recognised independence in 1980 as Zimbabwe.

== Evolution of dominions to independence ==
Country	Date of Dominion status	Date of adoption of the Statute of Westminster	Date of final relinquishment of British powers	Instrument of relinquishment	Notes
Australia	1 January 1901	9 October 1942^{†} (Note: Statute of Westminster Adoption Act 1942 (effective from 1939))	3 March 1986	Australia Act 1986	
Canada	1 July 1867	11 December 1931	17 April 1982	Canada Act 1982	
Ireland	6 December 1922 (Note: Constitution of the Irish Free State)	12 November 1931	18 April 1949	Republic of Ireland Act and Ireland Act 1949	The 1916 Proclamation of the Irish Republic and 1919 Irish Declaration of Independence were never recognised by the UK but were given symbolic priority by post-1922 Irish leaders. From the 1932 Irish election, successive governments unilaterally amended the state's status: the Constitution (Removal of Oath) Act on 3 May 1933 implicitly abrogated the 1921 Anglo-Irish Treaty; the 27th amendment and External Relations Act, both on 12 December 1936, attenuated the role of the monarchy; the enactment of the Constitution on 29 December 1937 established the office of President and definitively abolished all British powers over Ireland except diplomatic functions, which remained vested with King George VI; the Republic of Ireland Act, which transferred diplomatic functions to the President of Ireland, came into force on 18 April 1949, with Ireland formally leaving the British Commonwealth.; Related UK statutes included the Éire (Confirmation of Agreements) Act 1938 and the Ireland Act 1949.
Dominion of Newfoundland	26 September 1907	—	17 April 1982	Canada Act 1982	Newfoundland voted to join Canada in 1948 in a 52–48 vote; this became effective on 31 March 1949.
New Zealand	26 September 1907	25 November 1947 (Note: Statute of Westminster Adoption Act 1947)	13 December 1986	Constitution Act 1986	Declaration of Independence of New Zealand 1835, Treaty of Waitangi 1840, Dominion of New Zealand declared on 26 September 1907
South Africa	31 May 1910	11 December 1931	21 May 1961	South African Constitution of 1961	

†Adopted by Australia in 1942, but was backdated to confirm the validity of legislation passed by the Australian Parliament during World War II.

== Military occupations that did not retain the pre-war central government ==
Country	Pre-independence name (different)	Date	Year of independence or first stage	Notes
Iraq	Coalition Provisional Authority	28 June	2004	Jointly with the United States and Poland, as part of the Multi-National Force – Iraq which operated under United States leadership

== Former British crown colonies that declared independence then later restored British rule ==
Country	Date of independence		Date of restoration of British rule		Notes
Country	Day & month	Year	Day & month	Year	Notes
Anguilla	12 July	1967	19 March	1969	The isles of Anguilla were a dependency of Saint Kitts alongside Nevis. The ruling party administration for St. Kitts moved to make the Saint Christopher-Nevis-Anguilla colony into a looser associated state status with the UK in 1967 much to the dismay of many in Anguilla, with agitation turning into the Anguillan Revolution; Anguilla's population moved in favour of returning to British authority in 1971 with full British Crown Colony status (renamed in 2002 as British Overseas Territory status) returning in 1980.
Rhodesia	11 November	1965	21 December	1979	Southern Rhodesia declared independence from United Kingdom on 11 November 1965 as Rhodesia, which was not internationally recognized. Rhodesia transitioned to majority rule as Zimbabwe-Rhodesia on 1 June 1979 with a view to eventual international recognition, but instead returned to British control under the Lancaster House Agreement followed by internationally recognised independence in 1980 as Zimbabwe.

== British overseas territories independence/sovereignty referendums ==
Territory	Date		Notes
Bermuda	16 August	1995	Bermudians voted against independence for the territory in a 1995 referendum by 73.6% to 25.7%.
Gibraltar	7 November	2002	Gibraltar held a referendum on whether or not to share sovereignty with Spain. 98.48% of voters rejected the proposal in favour of remaining solely a British overseas territory with only 1.02% supporting the proposal.
Falkland Islands	11 March	2013	Falkland Islanders voted in favour of remaining a British overseas territory by 99.8% to 0.2%.

== Colonial and overseas territories which were relinquished to other sovereign states ==
Territory	Recipient state	Date	Year	Notes
Bay Islands	Honduras	30 April	1859	See Bay Islands § Colony of the Bay Islands and § Cession of the Colony to Honduras
Northern Cameroons	Nigeria	1 October	1961	British Mandate territory in West Africa. In the 1961 British Cameroons referendum, the Northern Cameroons voted to join Nigeria (which itself gained independence from the United Kingdom), while the Southern Cameroons voted to join the Republic of Cameroun (which itself gained independence from France).
Southern Cameroons	Cameroon	1 October	1961	British Mandate territory in West Africa. In the 1961 British Cameroons referendum, the Northern Cameroons voted to join Nigeria (which itself gained independence from the United Kingdom), while the Southern Cameroons voted to join the Republic of Cameroun (which itself gained independence from France).
Columbia District	United States	15 June	1846	Under the Oregon Treaty, the existing border between the United States and British North America, set on the 49th parallel north between Lake of the Woods and the Rocky Mountains by the Treaty of 1818, was extended west of the Rocky Mountains to the Pacific Ocean, with the exception that all of Vancouver Island would remain British.
East Florida	Spanish Empire	25 November	1783	Ceded to Spain as part of the 1783 Treaty of Paris; Spain subsequently ceded it to the United States in 1819.
West Florida	Spanish Empire	25 November	1783	Ceded to Spain as part of the 1783 Treaty of Paris; Spain subsequently ceded it to the United States in 1819.
British occupation zone in Germany	Federal Republic of Germany (West Germany)	23 May	1949	Nazi Germany occupied by Britain, France, the United States and the Soviet Union in 1945. Unlike in Austria, no German central government was retained in any of the occupation zones. The British and American occupation zones were merged in 1947 to form the Bizone, and the French zone was added into it in 1948. The resulting Trizone became host to a new German central government on 23 May 1949. The territories of the former Soviet zone — which had established a central government of its own called the German Democratic Republic — joined the Federal Republic on 3 October 1990.
Heligoland	German Empire	1 July	1890	
Hong Kong	People's Republic of China	30 June	1997	In 1984 the British government signed the Sino-British Joint Declaration with China and agreed to turn over Hong Kong and its dependencies in 1997. British rule ended on 30 June 1997, with China taking over at midnight, 1 July 1997 (at end of the 99-year lease over the New Territories, along with the ceded Hong Kong Island and Kowloon).
United States of the Ionian Islands	Kingdom of Greece	28 May	1864	
North Borneo	Malaya (Note: Malaya renamed itself Malaysia on the same day)	16 September	1963	British protectorate established in 1881. Proclaimed a Crown Colony in 1946, granted self rule on 31 August 1963 in preparation to become a part of Malaysia on 16 September 1963 as the state of Sabah.
Red River Colony	United States	30 January	1819	Under the Treaty of 1818, the borders between the United States and British North America west of Lake of the Woods and east of the Rocky Mountains were set to follow the 49th parallel north.
Sarawak	Malaya	16 September	1963	Independent Raj of Sarawak 1841-1946. Annexed by Britain as a Crown Colony in 1946, granted self rule on 22 July 1963 in preparation to become a part of Malaysia on 16 September 1963.
Singapore	Malaya	16 September	1963	Became self-governing on 3 June 1959, and became a part of Malaysia on 16 September 1963. Subsequently gained independence from Malaysia on the 9 August 1965.

== Countries of the United Kingdom that have voted against independence ==
Country	Date	Year	Notes
Northern Ireland	8 March	1973	In the 1973 Northern Ireland referendum, voters in Northern Ireland were asked to decide if they wanted to remain in the United Kingdom or to leave and join with the Republic of Ireland. They voted in favour of the United Kingdom by 98.9% to 1.1%, although Irish Nationalists boycotted the vote.
Scotland	18 September	2014	In the 2014 Scottish independence referendum, 55.3% of voters who qualified as residents of Scotland, chose 'No' to the question: 'Should Scotland be an independent country?' 44.7% of voters chose 'Yes'. In March 2017, preliminary negotiations to begin to prepare an agreement to run a second referendum were proposed by the Scottish Parliament but were rejected out of hand by the Prime Minister. The proposal of preliminary negotiations was triggered by the Brexit vote, which saw a majority of voters in England and Wales vote to leave the EU while a majority in Scotland and Northern Ireland voted to remain.

== See also ==
- Self-determination
- Commonwealth of Nations
- List of national independence days
- Foreign relations of the United Kingdom
- Foreign, Commonwealth and Development Office
- Foreign and Commonwealth Office Migrated Archives
- Special Committee on Decolonization
- 1933 Western Australian secession referendum
- 1977 Nevis independence referendum
