= Union of South Africa =

British dominion in southern Africa from 1910 to 1961

Coordinates: 30°S 25°E

Union of South Africa Unie van Zuid-Afrika (Dutch) Unie van Suid-Afrika (Afrikaans)
- 1910–1961
- Flag (1928–1961) Coat of arms
- Motto: Ex Unitate Vires (Latin) ("Union is Strength")
- Anthem: God Save the King (1910–1952); God Save the Queen (1952–1957) (Note: Remained the royal anthem until 1961) Die Stem van Suid-Afrika (1938–1961) (English: "The Call of South Africa")
- Union of South Africa with South West Africa shown in light green (occupied in 1915 and administered as 5th province of the Union under a C-mandate from the League of Nations)
- Status: Dominion of the British Empire (1910–1931) (Note: The United Kingdom and the Union of South Africa considered each other states with equal status within the British Empire. However, for other sovereign states and the international community as a whole (i.e. League of Nations), the term Dominion was very ambiguous. At the time of the founding of the League of Nations in 1924, the League Covenant made provision for the admission of any "fully self-governing state, Dominion, or Colony", the implication being that "Dominion status was something between that of a colony and a state"); Sovereign state (1931–1961) (Note: With the Statute of Westminster 1931 the ambiguity is dispelled for the international community with three British Dominions (Irish Free State, Canada and Union of South Africa), being recognized as sovereign states in their own right. Unlike what happened in Australia in 1942 and New Zealand in 1947, the whole statute was applied to the Dominion of Canada, the Irish Free State, and the Union of South Africa without the need for any acts of ratification.)
- Capital: Cape Town (legislative); Pretoria (administrative); Bloemfontein (judicial)
- Largest city: Johannesburg
- Official languages: English; Dutch; Afrikaans; (Note: Although the Official Languages of the Union Act of 1925, which replaced the language provision of South Africa Act 1909 that only recognised Dutch, in theory recognised both Dutch and Afrikaans as equal varieties of the same pluricentric language, the Act served to largely displace standard Dutch as a language of government in favour of standard Afrikaans.)
- Ethnic groups (1960): 68.3% Black; 19.2% White; 9.4% Coloured; 3.0% Indian
- Government: Unitary ethnocratic constitutional monarchy
- Monarch
  - 1910–1936: George V
  - 1936: Edward VIII
  - 1936–1952: George VI
  - 1952–1961: Elizabeth II
- Governor-General
  - 1910–1914 (first): The Viscount Gladstone
  - 1959–1961 (last): C. R. Swart
- Prime Minister
  - 1910–1919 (first): Louis Botha
  - 1958–1961 (last): Hendrik Verwoerd
- Legislature: Parliament
  - Upper house: Senate
  - Lower house: House of Assembly
- Historical era: World War I; Interwar period; World War II; Cold War
  - Foundation: 31 May 1910
  - Implementation of apartheid: c. 1948
  - Republic: 31 May 1961

Area
  - Total: 2,045,329 km^{2} (789,706 sq mi)

Population
  - 1960 census: 16,528,801
- Currency: South African pound (1910–1961); South African rand (1961)
Preceded by
Cape Colony
Natal Colony
Orange River Colony
Transvaal Colony
Succeeded by
Republic of South Africa (1961–1984)

The Union of South Africa (Dutch: Unie van Zuid-Afrika; Afrikaans: Unie van Suid-Afrika,) was a British Dominion and, later, a Commonwealth realm in southern Africa from 1910 to 1961. It was the historical predecessor to the present-day Republic of South Africa. It came into existence on 31 May 1910 with the unification of the Cape, Natal, Transvaal, and Orange River colonies. It included the territories that were formerly part of the South African Republic and the Orange Free State.

Following World War I, the Union of South Africa was a signatory of the Treaty of Versailles and became one of the founding members of the League of Nations. It was mandated by the League with the administration of South West Africa (now known as Namibia). South West Africa became treated in most respects as another province of the Union, but it never was formally annexed.

The Union of South Africa was a self-governing dominion of the British Empire. Its full sovereignty was confirmed with the Balfour Declaration of 1926 and the Statute of Westminster 1931. It was governed under a form of constitutional monarchy, with the Crown being represented by a governor-general. The Union came to an end with the enactment of the constitution of 1961, by which it became a republic and left the Commonwealth of Nations. The Republic of South Africa rejoined the Commonwealth on 1 June 1994.

== Constitution ==
=== Main features ===
The provinces of the Union

The Union of South Africa was a unitary state, rather than a federation like Canada and Australia, with each colony's parliaments being abolished and replaced with provincial councils. A bicameral parliament was created, consisting of the House of Assembly and Senate, with members of the parliament being elected mostly by the country's white minority. During the course of the Union, the franchise changed on several occasions always to suit the needs of the government of the day. Parliamentary sovereignty was a convention of the constitution, inherited from the United Kingdom; save for procedural safeguards in respect of the entrenched sections of franchise and language, the courts were unable to intervene in Parliament's decisions.

=== Capitals ===
Pretoria was the seat of government, while the Parliament sat in Cape Town and the Appellate Division in Bloemfontein.

=== Relationship to the Crown ===
The Union initially remained under the British Crown as a self-governing dominion of the British Empire. With the passage of the Statute of Westminster in 1931, the Union and other dominions became equal in status to the United Kingdom, and the Parliament of the United Kingdom could no longer legislate on behalf of them. This had the effect of making the Union and the other dominions de jure sovereign nations. The Status of the Union Act, passed by the South African Parliament in 1934, incorporated the applicable portions of the Statute of Westminster into South African law, underscoring its status as a sovereign nation. It removed what remaining authority Whitehall had to legislate for South Africa, as well as any nominal role that the United Kingdom had in granting Royal Assent. The governor-general was now required to sign or veto bills passed by Parliament, without the option of seeking advice from London.

The monarch was represented in South Africa by a governor-general, while effective power was exercised by the Executive Council, headed by the prime minister. Louis Botha, formerly a Boer general, was appointed the first prime minister of the Union, heading a coalition representing the white Afrikaner and English-speaking British diaspora communities.

Prosecutions before courts were instituted in the name of the Crown (cited in the format Rex / Regina v Accused) and government officials served in the name of the Crown.

=== Languages ===
An entrenched clause in the Constitution mentioned Dutch and English as official languages of the Union, but the meaning of Dutch was changed by the Official Languages of the Union Act, 1925 to include both Dutch and Afrikaans.

=== Final days of the South Africa Act and legacy ===
Most English-speaking whites in South Africa supported the United Party of Jan Smuts, which favoured close relations with the United Kingdom and the Commonwealth, unlike the Afrikaans-speaking National Party, which had held anti-British sentiments and was opposed to South Africa's intervention in the Second World War. Some Nationalist organisations, like the Ossewabrandwag, were openly supportive of Nazi Germany during the Second World War. Additionally, most English-speaking South Africans were opposed to the creation of a republic, many of them voting "no" in the 5 October 1960 referendum. But due to the much larger number of Afrikaans-speaking voters, the referendum passed, leading to the establishment of a republic on 31 May 1961. The government led by the National Party consequently withdrew South Africa from the Commonwealth. Following the results of the referendum, some whites in Natal, which had an English-speaking majority, called for secession from the Union. Five years earlier, some 33,000 Natalians had signed the Natal Covenant in opposition to the plans for a republic.

Subsequently, the National Party government had passed a Constitution that repealed the South Africa Act 1909. The features of the Union were carried over with very little change to the newly formed Republic. The decision to transform from a Union to Republic was narrowly decided in the referendum. The decision together with the South African Government's insistence on adhering to its policy of apartheid resulted in South Africa's de facto expulsion from the Commonwealth of Nations.

=== Segregation ===
Encyclopedia Britannica Films documentary about South Africa from 1956

The South Africa Act 1909 dealt with race in two specific provisions. First it entrenched the liberal (by South African standards) Cape Qualified Franchise system of the Cape Colony which operated free of any racial considerations (although due to socio-economic restrictions no real political expression of non-whites was possible). The Cape Prime Minister at the time, John X. Merriman, fought hard, but ultimately unsuccessfully, to extend this system of multi-racial franchise to the rest of South Africa.

Second, it made "native affairs" a matter for the national government. The practice therefore was to establish a Minister of Native Affairs.

According to Stephen Howe, "colonialism in some cases—most obviously among white minorities in South Africa—meant mainly that these violent settlers wanted to maintain more racial inequalities than the colonial empire found just".

== Previous attempts at unification ==
Several previous unsuccessful attempts to unite the colonies were made, with proposed political models ranging from unitary, to loosely federal.

=== Early unification attempt under Sir George Grey (1850s) ===
Sir George Grey, the Governor of Cape Colony from 1854 to 1861, decided that unifying the states of southern Africa would be mutually beneficial. The stated reasons were that he believed that political divisions between the white-controlled states "weakened them against the natives", threatened an ethnic divide between British and Boer, and left the Cape vulnerable to interference from other European powers. He believed that a united "South African Federation", under British control, would resolve all three of these concerns.

His idea was greeted with cautious optimism in southern Africa; the Orange Free State agreed to the idea in principle and the Transvaal may also eventually have agreed. However, he was overruled by the British Colonial Office which ordered him to desist from his plans. His refusal to abandon the idea eventually led to him being recalled.

=== The imposition of confederation (1870s) ===
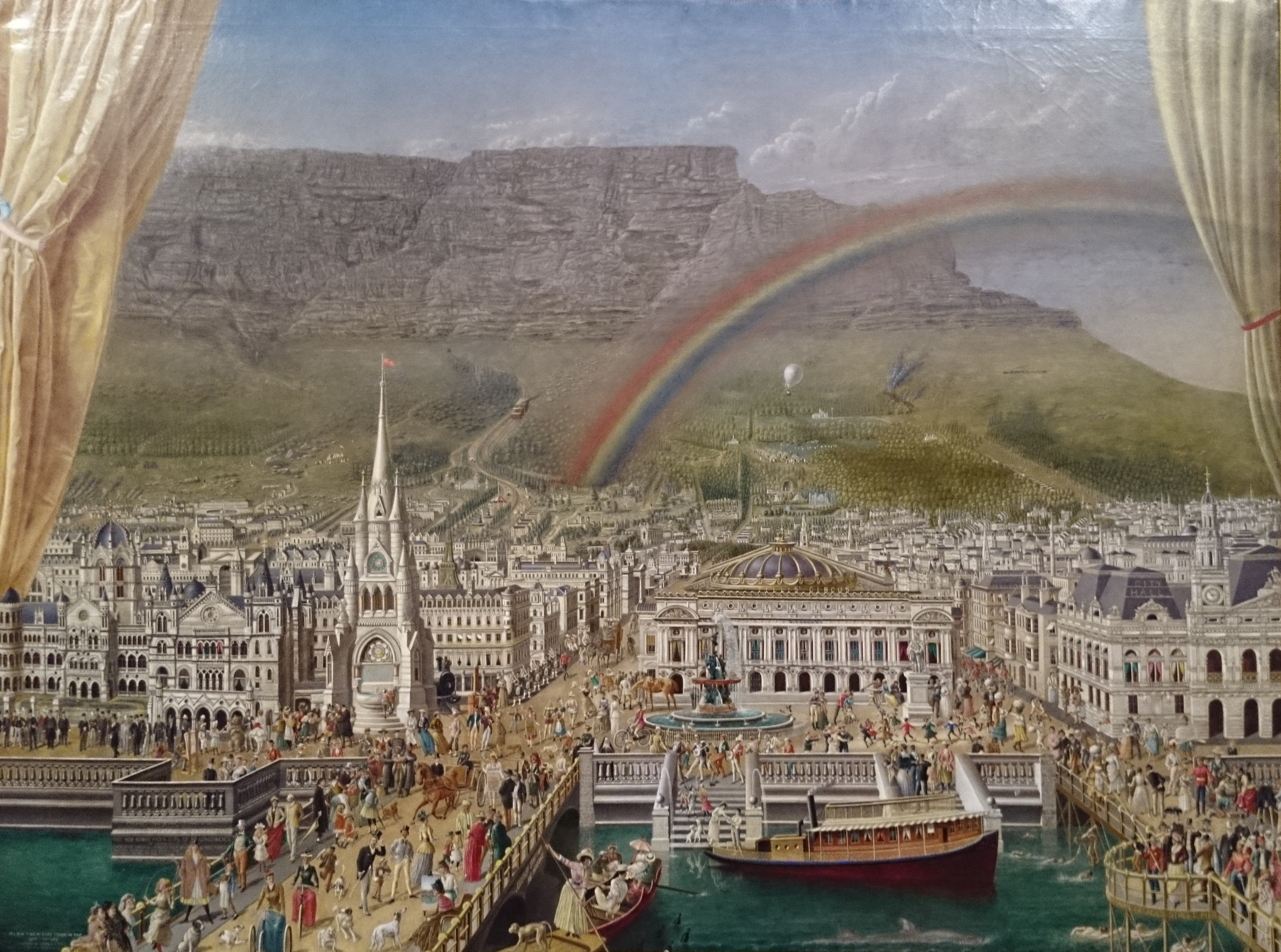
Holiday Time in Cape Town (1891–1899) depicted an imagined future united South Africa at a time when the idea was being widely debated in the Cape Colony.

In the 1870s, the London Colonial Office, under Secretary for the Colonies Lord Carnarvon, decided to apply a system of confederation onto southern Africa. On this occasion, however, it was largely rejected by southern Africans, primarily due to its very bad timing. The various component states of southern Africa were still simmering after the last bout of British expansion, and inter-state tensions were high. The Orange Free State this time refused to even discuss the idea, and Prime Minister John Molteno of the Cape Colony called the idea badly informed and irresponsible. In addition, many local leaders resented the way it was imposed from outside without understanding of local issues. The Confederation model was also seen as unsuitable for the disparate entities of southern Africa, with their wildly different sizes, economies and political systems.

The Molteno Unification Plan (1877), put forward by the Cape government as a more feasible unitary alternative to confederation, largely anticipated the final act of Union in 1909. A crucial difference was that the Cape's liberal constitution and multiracial franchise were to be extended to the other states of the union. These smaller states would gradually accede to the much larger Cape Colony through a system of treaties, whilst simultaneously gaining elected seats in the Cape parliament. The entire process would be locally driven, with Britain's role restricted to policing any set-backs. While subsequently acknowledged to be more viable, this model was rejected at the time by London. At the other extreme, another powerful Cape politician at the time, Saul Solomon, proposed an extremely loose system of federation, with the component states preserving their very different constitutions and systems of franchise.

Lord Carnarvon rejected the (more informed) local plans for unification, as he wished to have the process brought to a conclusion before the end of his tenure and, having little experience of southern Africa, he preferred to enforce the more familiar model of confederation used in Canada. He pushed ahead with his Confederation plan, which unraveled as predicted, leaving a string of destructive wars across southern Africa. These conflicts eventually fed into the first and second Anglo-Boer Wars, with far-reaching consequences for the subcontinent.

=== Second Boer War (1899–1902) ===
After the discovery of gold in the 1880s, thousands of British immigrants flocked to the gold mines of the Transvaal Republic and the Orange Free State. The newly arrived miners, though needed for the mines, were distrusted by the politically dominant Afrikaners, who called them "uitlanders", imposed heavy taxes on them and granted them very limited civil rights, with no right to vote. The British government, interested in profiting from the gold and diamond mines there and highly protective of its own citizens, demanded reforms, which the Afrikaners rejected. A small-scale private British effort to overthrow Transvaal's President Paul Kruger, the Jameson Raid of 1895, proved a fiasco, and presaged full-scale conflict as diplomatic efforts all failed.

The Second Boer War started on 11 October 1899 and ended on 31 May 1902. The United Kingdom gained the support of its Cape Colony, of its Colony of Natal and of some African allies. Volunteers from across the British Empire further supplemented the British war effort. All other nations remained neutral, but public opinion in them was largely hostile to Britain. Inside Britain and its Empire there was also significant opposition to the Second Boer War, spearheaded by anti-war activists such as Emily Hobhouse.

At the onset of the war, the British were both overconfident about the chances of success in a military confrontation with the Boer republics and underprepared for a long-term conflict. British Prime Minister Lord Salisbury and members of his cabinet, in particular Colonial Secretary Joseph Chamberlain, ignored repeated warnings that Boer forces were more powerful than previous reports had suggested. In the last months of 1899, Boer forces launched the first attacks of the war, besieging the British-held settlements of Ladysmith, Kimberley and Mafeking, and winning several engagements against British troops at Colenso, Magersfontein and Stormberg. However, by the next year the British soon organised an effective response to these attacks, lifting the three sieges and winning several battles against Boer forces. The British, now deploying approximately 400,000 soldiers from across their colonial empire, successfully invaded and occupied the Boer republics. Numerous Boer soldiers refused to surrender and took to the countryside to carry out guerrilla operations against the British, who responded by implementing scorched earth tactics. These tactics included interning Afrikaner civilians from the Boer republics in concentration camps (in which roughly 28,000 people died) and destroying homesteads owned by Afrikaners to flush out the guerillas and deny them a base of civilian support. Using these tactics combined with a system of blockhouses and barriers to seal off Boer holdouts, the British were able to gradually track down and defeat the guerillas. In the 1902 Treaty of Vereeniging, the British formally annexed the Boer republics into the Cape Colony, ending the war.

=== Impact of the Bhambatha Rebellion ===
The Bhambatha Rebellion was a rebellion by the Zulu against colonial rule in the Colony of Natal in 1906. It saw around 3000–4000 Zulus killed by the British, and popularised the thought among colonisers that the unification of the colonies was necessary to maintain white supremacy.

== History of the Union of South Africa ==
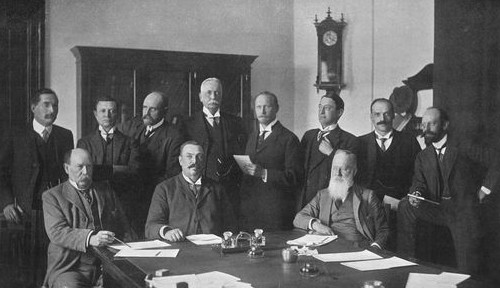
The first Union cabinet, 1910

=== National Convention ===
The National Convention was a constitutional convention held between 1908 and 1909 in Durban (12 October to 5 November 1908), Cape Town (23 November to 18 December 1908, 11 January to 3 February 1909) and Bloemfontein (3 to 11 May 1909). This convention led to the British Parliament's adoption of the South Africa Act 1909, which ratified the Union. The four colonies that would become South Africa were represented, along with a delegation from Rhodesia. The 33 delegates assembled behind closed doors, in the fear that a public affair would lead delegates to refuse compromising on contentious areas. The delegates drew up a constitution that, subject to some amendments by the British government, became the South Africa Act. This was South Africa's constitution between 1910 and 1961, when the country became a republic under the Constitution of 1961.

=== Union of South Africa and Southern Rhodesia ===
In 1922 the colony of Southern Rhodesia had a chance (but ultimately rejected) to join the Union through a referendum. The referendum resulted from the fact that by 1920 British South Africa Company rule in Southern Rhodesia was no longer practical with many favouring some form of 'responsible government'. Some favoured responsible government within Southern Rhodesia while others (especially in Matabeleland) favoured membership of the Union of South Africa. Politician Sir Charles Coghlan claimed that such membership with the Union would make Southern Rhodesia the "Ulster of South Africa".

Prior to the referendum, representatives of Southern Rhodesia visited Cape Town where the Prime Minister of South Africa, Jan Smuts, eventually offered terms he considered reasonable and which the United Kingdom government found acceptable. Although opinion among the United Kingdom government, the South African government and the British South Africa Company favoured the union option (and none tried to interfere in the referendum), when the referendum was held the results saw 59.4% in favour of responsible government for a separate colony and 40.6% in favour of joining the Union of South Africa.

=== Union of South Africa and South West Africa ===
==== Background ====
The inhospitable coast of what is now Namibia remained uncolonised up until the end of the 19th century.

From 1874, the leaders of several Indigenous peoples, notably Maharero of the Herero nation, approached the Cape Parliament to the south. Anticipating invasion by a European power and already suffering Portuguese encroachment from the north and Afrikaner encroachment from the south, these leaders approached the Cape Colony government to discuss the possibility of accession and the political representation it would entail. Accession to the Cape Colony, a self-governing state with a system of multi-racial franchise and legal protection for traditional land rights, was at the time considered marginally preferable to annexation by either the Kingdom of Portugal or the German Empire.

In response, the Cape Parliament appointed a special Commission under William Palgrave, to travel to the territory between the Orange and Cunene rivers and to confer with these leaders regarding accession to the Cape. In the negotiations with the Palgrave Commission, some indigenous nations such as the Damara and the Herero responded positively (October 1876), other reactions were mixed. Discussions regarding the magisterial structure for the area's political integration into the Cape dragged on until, from 1876, it was blocked by Britain. Britain relented, insofar as allowing the Cape to incorporate Walvis Bay as an exclave, which was brought under the magisterial district of Cape Town, but when the Germans established a protectorate over the area in 1884, South West Africa was predominantly autonomous.

Thereafter, South West Africa became a German colony, except for Walvis Bay and the Offshore Islands which remained part of the Cape, outside of German control.

==== South African occupation ====
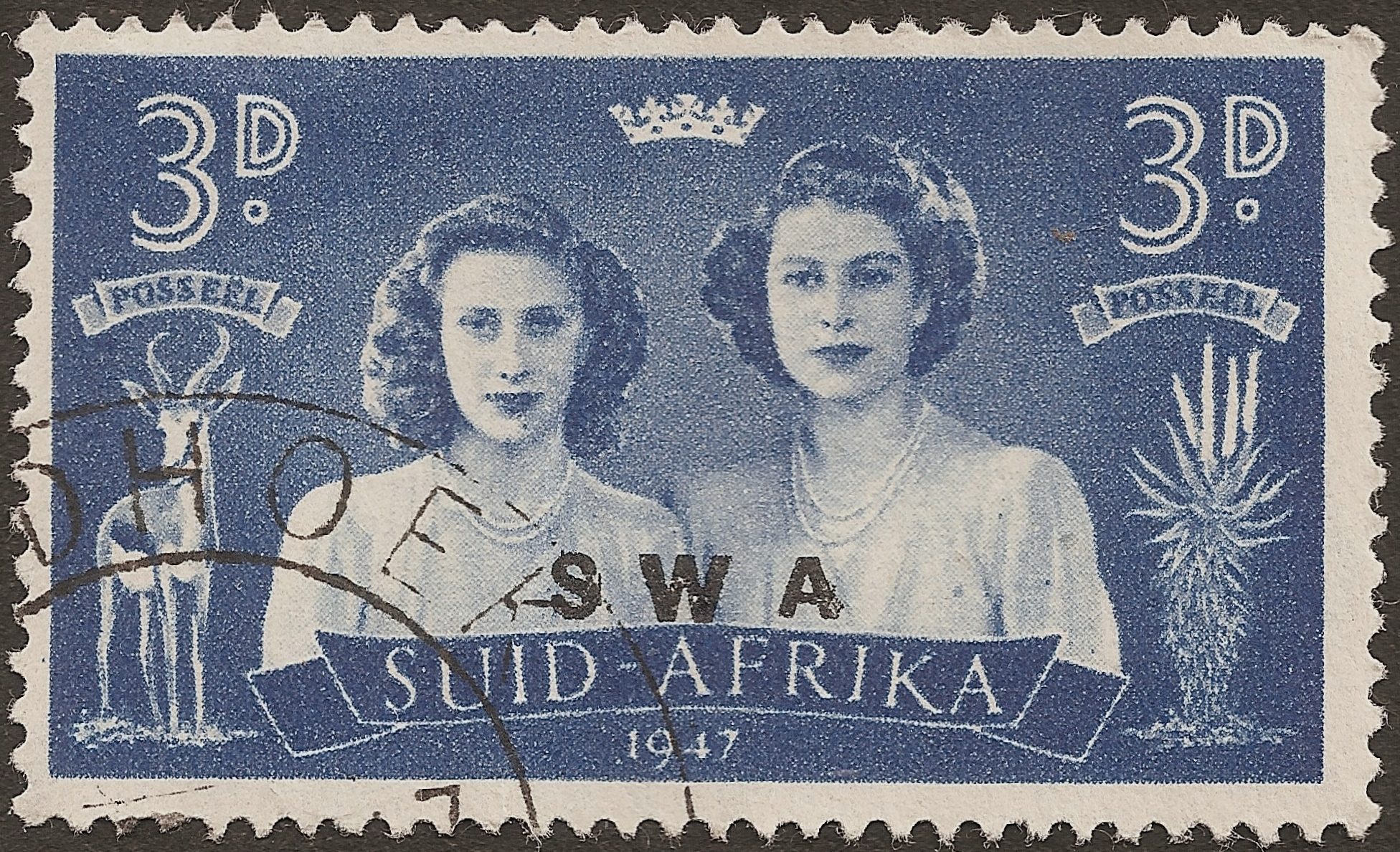
South West Africa stamp: Princesses Elizabeth and Margaret on the 1947 Royal Tour of South Africa

Following the outbreak of the First World War in 1914, the Union of South Africa occupied and annexed the German colony of German South West Africa. With the establishment of the League of Nations and cessation of the war, South Africa obtained a Class C Mandate to administer South West Africa "under the laws of the mandatory (South Africa) as integral portions of its territory". Subsequently, the Union of South Africa generally regarded South West Africa as a fifth province, although this was never an official status.

With the creation of the United Nations, the Union applied for the incorporation of South West Africa, but its application was rejected by the U.N., which invited South Africa to prepare a Trusteeship agreement instead. This invitation was in turn rejected by the Union, which subsequently did not modify the administration of South West Africa and continued to adhere to the original mandate. This caused a complex set of legal wranglings that were not finalised when the Union was replaced with the Republic of South Africa. In 1949, the Union passed a law bringing South West Africa into closer association with it including giving South West Africa representation in the South African parliament.

Walvis Bay, which is now in Namibia, was originally a part of the Union of South Africa as an exclave as it was a part of the Cape Colony at the time of Unification. In 1921, Walvis Bay was integrated with the Class C Mandate over South West Africa for the rest of the Union's duration and for part of the republican era.

=== Statute of Westminster ===
The Statute of Westminster passed by the British Parliament in December 1931, which repealed the Colonial Laws Validity Act 1865 and implemented the Balfour Declaration 1926, had a profound impact on the constitutional structure and status of the Union. The most notable effect was that the South African Parliament was released from many restrictions concerning the handling of the so-called "native question". However, the repeal was not sufficient to enable the South African Parliament to ignore the entrenched clauses of its constitution (the South Africa Act 1909) which led to the coloured-vote constitutional crisis of the 1950s wherein the right of coloureds to vote in the main South African Parliament was removed and replaced with a separate, segregated, and largely powerless assembly.

== Military ==
The military of the Union of South Africa was the Union Defence Force (UDF) until 1957, when it became the South African Defence Force (SADF).

=== Navy ===
South Africa did not initially have a navy and instead the British Royal Navy patrolled its waters. During the First World War a South African volunteer unit was formed called the RNVR(SA) or the Royal Navy Volunteer Reserve South Africa Division which saw action in German Southwest Africa. Not until April 1922 was a true navy established when the South African Naval Service was founded. Four ships were obtained with one being a survey ship and the three others being minesweepers.

On September 1, 1939 the Seaward Defense Force replaced the Naval Service and South Africa's Navy expanded dramatically during the Second World War with ships being sent by the Royal Navy to the Mediterranean Sea. The Seaward Defense Force was merged with the RNVR(SA) in August 1942 creating the South African Naval Forces. No black sailors were allowed to serve on South African vessels during the Second World War but Indian and other non-whites were permitted but in a noncombatant manner. During the war a total of 1,436 officers and 8,896 ratings served along with 316 women in the South African Women's Auxiliary Naval Service which was created in October 1943.

After the end of Second World War, the Navy shrank. Also after the Second World War and with the rise of Apartheid along with Afrikaner Nationalism saw the name of the Navy change once again in January 1951 from the South African Naval Forces to the South African Navy along with ship prefixes changing from HMSAS to SAS. A British base located in Simon Town was transferred to South Africa in April 1957.

=== Air Force ===
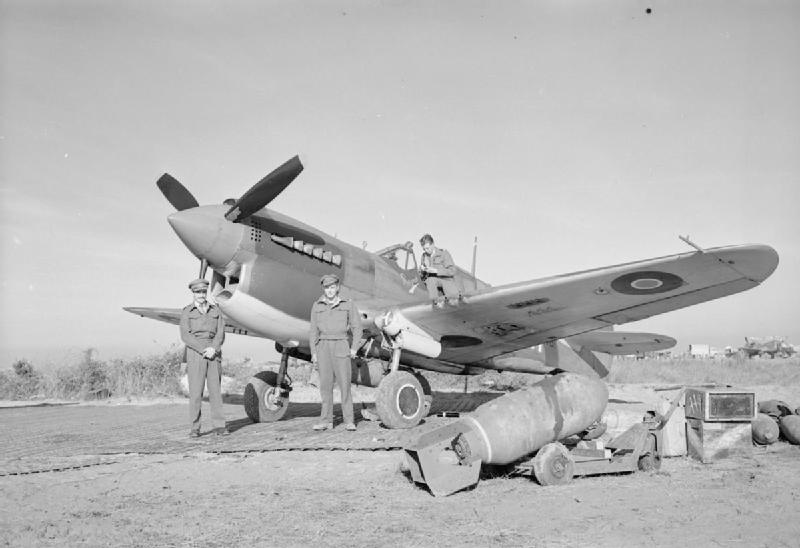
A No. 5 Squadron SAAF Kittyhawk fighter aircraft in Italy

South Africa established its own official air force on 1 February 1920. Its initial fighters were planes acquired from the British as South Africa did not produce its own military aircraft until the 1930s. The South African Air Force saw its first official action during the Rand Rebellion in 1922. During the interwar period, the Air Force expanded in terms of the number of planes, squadrons and facilities.

During World War 2, civilian planes were commandeered by the Air Force and the overall size of it increased. It participated in several campaigns during World War 2 which were mostly in Africa. A unit for women existed during World War II called the South AFRICAN Women's Auxiliary Air Force which had 6,500 members in it. The Air Force was scaled down in the aftermath of World War 2 but it did participate in the Berlin Airlift and the Korean War. In 1954 South Africa got its first jet aircraft.

== Demographics ==
In the first census held in 1911 the Union had a population of approximately 5.97 million people. By 1960 at the time of the last census a population of approximately 16 million was reported. During each time the census was taken the white population was the minority. There was always a larger male than female population in South Africa each time the census was taken.

Starting in the mid-1930s South Africa experienced urbanization.

=== Statistics ===
Population by province by year and census (regardless of race and gender, also includes South West Africa)
Year	Cape	Natal	Transvaal	Orange Free State	South West Africa	Total
1911	2,564,328	1,194,043	1,686,212	528,174	N/A	5,972,757
1921	2,781,542	1,429,398	2,087,636	628,827	[data missing]	6,927,403
1936	3,527,865	1,946,468	3,341,470	772,060	317,725	9,905,588
1946	4,051,424	2,202,392	4,283,038	879,071	[data missing]	11,415,925
1951	4,426,726	2,415,318	4,812,838	1,016,570	417,928	13,089,380
1960	5,362,853	2,979,920	6,273,477	1,386,547	526,004	16,528,801

Population by race in each province, 1960
Province	Cape		Natal		Transvaal		Orange Free State		Total
Race	Cape		Natal		Transvaal		Orange Free State		Total
Race	#	%	#	%	#	%	#	%	Total
Bantu	3,011,080	56.15%	2,199,578	73.81%	4,633,378	73.86%	1,083,886	78.17%	10,927,922
White	1,003,207	18.71%	340,235	11.42%	1,468,305	23.4%	276,745	19.96%	3,088,492
Mixed-race	1,330,089	24.8%	45,253	1.52%	108,007	1.72%	25,909	1.87%	1,509,258
Asian	18,477	0.34%	394,854	13.25%	63,787	1.02%	7	0%	477,125
Total	5,362,853	100%	2,979,920	100%	6,273,477	100%	1,386,547	100%	16,002,797

== Arts and culture ==
=== Athletics ===
Sports teams were racially segregated after a 1956 law was passed. Prior to racial segregation being legalized teams were already de facto racially segregated as white-only teams existed. One example was the South African Soccer Federation for black athletes in football and the South African Football Association which was meant for white athletes.

During the period of the Union, it participated in every Summer Olympics games during its existence from the 1912 to the 1960 Summer Olympics games. It participated in only one Winter Olympics game which was held in 1960. South Africa was barred after the 1960 Summer and Winter games; not participating again until 1992 for not allowing black athletes to participate.

=== Film ===
South Africa had a number of film studios such as African Film Productions and Killarney Film Studios which were established by I. W. Schlesinger; African Film made just English-language movies. Some of Killarney Studios movies were even distributed abroad. Film censorship began in 1931 when the National Censorship Act was passed and later the Entertainment Act "which required pre-approval for any film content intended for public display". During the 1930s most films from South Africa were Afrikaner in nature and more specifically Afrikaner nationalist. Practically all films were made by whites. Much of the film industry in South Africa was independent as it was not affiliated with major studios until the mid to late 1950s when 75% of it over the course of 3 years was bought by 20th Century Fox.

== Flags and coats of arms ==
De facto flag
(1910–1912)

Red ensign
(1912–1951, de facto flag until 1928)

Blue ensign (1910–1928)

Flag
(1928–1961)
Coat of arms
(1910–1930)

Coat of arms
(1930–1932)

Coat of arms
(1932–1961)

== See also ==
- Basutoland
- Bechuanaland
- South West Africa
- Southern Rhodesia
- Swaziland Protectorate
- Republic of South Africa (1961–1984)

== Bibliography ==
Wikimedia Atlas of Union of South Africa

- Beck, Roger B. The History of South Africa (Greenwood, 2000).
- Davenport, Thomas, and Christopher Saunders. South Africa: A modern history (Springer, 2000).
- Eze, M. Intellectual history in contemporary South Africa (Springer, 2016).
- Robinson, G. G. (1905). "The Prospects of a United South Africa" . The Empire and the century. London: John Murray. pp. 521–538.
- Ross, Robert. A Concise History of South Africa (2009)
- Thompson, Leonard, and Lynn Berat. A History of South Africa (4th ed. 2014)
- Thompson, Leonard. The Unification of South Africa 1902 – 1910 (Oxford UP, 1960).
- Welsh, Frank. A History of South Africa (2000).
