= New Zealand Constitution Amendment (Request and Consent) Act 1947 =

Statute of the Parliament of the United Kingdom

New Zealand Parliament
- Long title: An Act to request and consent to the Enactment by the Parliament of the United Kingdom of an Act to provide for the Amendment of the Constitution of New Zealand.
- Royal assent: 25 November 1947

Amended by
- None

Related legislation
- Statute of Westminster Adoption Act 1947; Statute of Westminster 1931 (UK); New Zealand Constitution Amendment Act 1947
- Status: Repealed

The New Zealand Constitution Amendment (Request and Consent) Act 1947 (11 Geo. VI 1947 No. 44) was an enactment passed by the Parliament of New Zealand requesting and consenting to the subsequent enactment by the Parliament of the United Kingdom of the New Zealand Constitution Amendment Act 1947. The latter Act contributed to the independence of New Zealand, by granting the Parliament of New Zealand the complete ability to amend the New Zealand Constitution Act 1852, an enactment of the Parliament of the United Kingdom which established the institutions of responsible government in New Zealand.

== Background ==
When the New Zealand Constitution Act 1852 was passed, the General Assembly established under the Act was unable to amend or repeal the Act. In 1857 the Parliament of the United Kingdom passed the New Zealand Constitution (Amendment) Act 1857, which allowed the New Zealand General Assembly the ability to amend certain provisions of the Act. This was taken up by the New Provinces Act 1858, and eventually the Abolition of the Provinces Act 1867.

When New Zealand adopted the Statute of Westminster 1931 with the Statute of Westminster Adoption Act 1947, the Parliament of New Zealand gained the ability to amend all enactments that were passed for New Zealand by the British Parliament. As the 1857 Act barred the Parliament of New Zealand from amending the sections of the Constitution Act relating to parliament itself, the New Zealand Parliament passed the New Zealand Constitution Amendment (Request and Consent) Act 1947. This was largely due to the desire of the opposition to abolish the New Zealand Legislative Council, the upper house, which was barred by the 1857 Act.

== Effect ==
The New Zealand Constitution Amendment (Request and Consent) Act 1947, requested that the Parliament of the United Kingdom amend the New Zealand Constitution Act 1852, and consented to such changes (as required by the Statute of Westminster Adoption Act 1947). This is the only example of the Parliament of New Zealand requesting the Parliament of the United Kingdom to legislate on New Zealand's behalf.

The British Parliament consented to the request by passing the New Zealand Constitution (Amendment) Act 1947. The British Act was granted royal assent on 10 December 1947. The Legislative Council was abolished in 1951.

In the 1980s, Canada, Australia, and New Zealand severed their last remaining legislative links to the United Kingdom. However, Canada and Australia could not amend their constitutions without British approval. When Canada passed the Constitution Act, 1982, it had to be approved by the British Parliament in the Canada Act 1982. The Australia Act 1986 was also passed by both the Australian and British parliaments. However, the New Zealand Constitution (Amendment) Act 1947 fully allowed New Zealand to amend its own constitution without British approval. Therefore, the New Zealand Parliament could pass the Constitution Act 1986 without the need of approval by the British Parliament.

== Repeal ==
The Acts were repealed as an element of New Zealand law by section 28 of the Constitution Act 1986.

The UK act was repealed as an element of UK law by the Statute Law (Repeals) Act 1989.

== See also ==
- Constitution of New Zealand
- Independence of New Zealand
