= Status of the Union Act, 1934 =

South African constitutional law, declaring independence from Britain

Parliament of South Africa
- Long title: Act to provide for the declaration of the Status of the Union of South Africa; for certain amendments of the South Africa Act, 1909, incidental thereto, and for the adoption of certain parts of the Statute of Westminster, 1931.
- Citation: Act No. 69 of 1934
- Territorial extent: Union of South Africa
- Enacted by: Parliament of South Africa
- Royal assent: 22 June 1934
- Commenced: 22 August 1934
- Repealed: 31 May 1961

Legislative history
- Bill title: Status of the Union Bill
- Bill citation: A.B. 48 of 1934
- Introduced by: Oswald Pirow, Minister of Railways and Harbours
- Introduced: 23 March 1934

Repealed by
- Republic of South Africa Constitution Act, 1961

Related legislation
- South Africa Act, 1909; Statute of Westminster 1931
- Status: Repealed

The Status of the Union Act, 1934 (Act No. 69 of 1934) was an act of the Parliament of South Africa that was the South African counterpart to the Statute of Westminster 1931. It declared the Union of South Africa to be a "sovereign independent state" and explicitly adopted the Statute of Westminster into South African law. It also removed any remaining power of the British Parliament to legislate for South Africa, and ended the United Kingdom's involvement in the granting or refusal of royal assent.

The Statute of Westminster applied to South Africa without needing ratification from its Parliament (unlike the case in Australia and New Zealand), so the Status Act was not legally necessary to establish South Africa's full sovereignty. It was, however, seen as a symbolic action by the Pact government of Prime Minister J. B. M. Hertzog, coming as it did shortly before the merger of his National Party with Jan Smuts's South African Party to form the United Party.

The Status of the Union Act was repealed by the South African Constitution of 1961, which ended South Africa's membership of the Commonwealth of Nations and transformed it into a republic.

== Provisions ==
The Status Act incorporated the Statute of Westminster into South African law as if it were an act of the South African Parliament. Sections 7 to 10 of the Statute were omitted because they dealt with matters specific to other Dominions of the British Commonwealth. The act further declared that "the Parliament of the Union shall be the sovereign legislative power in and over the Union," and that no act of the British Parliament would extend to South Africa unless extended by an act of the South African Parliament. This went further than the Statute of Westminster, which allowed the British Parliament to legislate for the Dominions at their request and with their consent.

With respect to the executive, the Status Act prescribed that the King, when exercising his executive powers in regard to South Africa, was required to act on the advice of the South African Prime Minister and Cabinet only. This made explicit what had previously been a constitutional convention.

The Status Act also altered the law governing the granting of the Royal assent. Originally, the Governor-General had three options when a bill was sent to him by Parliament: to assent to it, to withhold his assent (i.e. veto it), or to reserve it for the signification of the King's pleasure. Reservation meant sending it to the King for a decision, which would be taken on the advice of the British cabinet. The Status Act removed this power of reservation, requiring the Governor-General to either sign or veto each bill. It also removed the King's power to disallow (i.e. veto) an act within a year after the Governor-General had assented to it.

While it made the executive and legislative branches of the South African government completely independent of Britain, the Status Act did not affect the judicial branch. Appeals to the Privy Council from the Appellate Division remained possible until 1950.

== See also ==
- South African Constitution of 1961

Comparable acts regarding ex-Dominions' sovereignty

- Statute of Westminster Adoption Act 1942 and Australia Act 1986
- Canada Act 1982
- Indian Independence Act 1947, the Constitution of India and the 1956 Constitution of Pakistan
- Constitution of Ireland, governing the Irish Free State to Republic of Ireland transition
- Statute of Westminster Adoption Act 1947 and Constitution Act 1986 of New Zealand
- Sri Lankan Constitution of 1972
