= Official Languages of the Union Act, 1925 =

Parliament of South Africa
- Citation: Act No. 8 of 1925
- Territorial extent: Union of South Africa
- Enacted by: Parliament of South Africa
- Royal assent: 22 May 1925
- Commenced: 27 May 1925
- Effective: 31 May 1910
- Repealed: 31 May 1961

Repealed by
- South Africa Constitution Act, 1961

Related legislation
- South Africa Act, 1909

Summary
- Afrikaans is recognised to have been an official language since 31 May 1910
- Status: Repealed

The Official Languages of the Union Act, 1925 (Dutch: Wet op de Officiële Talen van de Unie, 1925), was an Act of the Parliament of South Africa which declared that references to the Dutch language in the South Africa Act 1909 included the Afrikaans language, effectively granting the latter official language status. The act came into force on 27 May 1925, but was deemed to have had effect since the creation of the Union of South Africa in 1910.

Although in theory recognising both Dutch and Afrikaans as equal varieties of the same pluricentric language, the Act served to largely displace standard Dutch as a language of government in favour of standard Afrikaans.

== Background ==
=== Ambiguity ===
The South Africa Act 1909—the constitution of the Union—declared the English and Dutch languages to be the state's official languages.

Part 8, section 137, of the South Africa Act read:

Both the English and Dutch languages shall be official languages of the Union, and shall be treated on a footing of equality, and possess and enjoy equal freedom, rights, and privileges; all records, journals, and proceedings of Parliament shall be kept in both languages, and all Bills, Acts, and notices of general public importance or interest issued by the Government of the Union shall be in both languages.

Doubts soon arose about the recognition of the Afrikaans language and whether its status as a Dutch daughter language meant it was implicitly included. Many Afrikaans-speakers still considered themselves to be speakers of Dutch — albeit a substandard variety of it — and standard Dutch remained commonly used in writing and formal settings. Meanwhile, the movement to recognise Afrikaans as unique language was growing, especially after the British conquest, with many Afrikaner intellectuals believing that a state of diglossia (that is, a discrepancy between the spoken and written language) would cause younger Afrikaners to switch to English instead. Recognising Afrikaans as a valid variety of Dutch was thus somewhat of a compromise between these two views.

== Provision ==
The single substantive provision of the Official Languages Act reads:

The word "Dutch" in section one hundred and thirty-seven of the South Africa Act, 1909, and wheresoever else that word occurs in the said Act, is hereby declared to include Afrikaans.

== Repeal ==
The South Africa Act and the Official Languages Act were repealed by the Constitution of 1961, which reversed the position of Afrikaans and Dutch. Subsequently, English and Afrikaans were the official languages, and Afrikaans was deemed to include Dutch.

The Constitution of 1983 removed any mention of Dutch altogether.

== Bibliography ==
- Newton, A. P., ed. (1936). "Chapter XXXII: Cultural Development". Cambridge History of the British Empire. Vol. 8. London: CUP. OCLC 222649801.
- Reagan, T. (1988). The "Language Struggle" in South Africa: Emergence and Development in Educational Policy. Storrs: TWEC. OCLC 17790045.
- Sen, D. (1940). "Chapter IX: Safeguards in the Dominions". The Problem of Minorities. Calcutta: Calcutta University Press. OCLC 917020385.
- Steyn, J. (June 2007). "Ons vier 'n negentigste verjaarsdag". Literator (in Afrikaans). 38 (1): a1365. doi:10.4102/lit.v38i1.1365. ISSN 2219-8237.
