= Statute of Westminster Adoption Act 1942 =

Australian Parliament act which formalised Australia's independence from the UK

Parliament of Australia
- Long title: An Act to remove Doubts as to the Validity of certain Commonwealth Legislation, to obviate Delays occurring in its Passage, and to effect certain related purposes, by adopting certain Sections of the Statute of Westminster 1931, as from the Commencement of the War between his Majesty the King and Germany
- Royal assent: 9 October 1942
- Commenced: 9 October 1942 (retroactive to 3 September 1939)

Amended by
- 1986 (minor)

Related legislation
- Australia Act 1986
- Status: Current legislation

The Statute of Westminster Adoption Act 1942 is an act of the Australian Parliament that formally adopted sections 2–6 of the Statute of Westminster 1931, an Act of the Parliament of the United Kingdom enabling the total legislative independence of the various self-governing Dominions of the British Empire. With its enactment, Westminster relinquished nearly all of its authority to legislate for the Dominions, effectively making them de jure sovereign nations.

With the enactment of the Adoption Act, the British Parliament could no longer legislate for the Commonwealth without the express request and consent of the Australian Parliament. The act received Royal Assent on 9 October 1942, but the adoption of the Statute was made retroactive to 3 September 1939, when Australia entered World War II.

The Act is more important for its symbolic value than for the legal effect of its provisions. While Australia's growing independence from the United Kingdom was well accepted, the adoption of the Statute of Westminster formally demonstrated Australia's independence to the world.

== Background ==
Australia's progression to effective independence was gradual and largely without incident.

New South Wales was founded as a British colony in Sydney in 1788. Other colonies split away from New South Wales or were separately established over the Australian mainland in the ensuing decades. The colonies became self-governing during the second half of the 19th century, starting with Victoria in 1852, although well before this time, all of the colonies had non-elected Legislative Councils to advise their respective Governors on matters of administration.

When the Commonwealth of Australia was formed with federation of the six colonies in 1901, following royal assent of the Commonwealth of Australia Act 1900, it became classified as a Dominion of the British Empire. This accorded Australia somewhat greater autonomy, though it was legally a self-governing British colony. After the end of World War I, each of the Dominions (including Australia, Canada, New Zealand and South Africa but not Newfoundland) signed the Treaty of Versailles separate from the United Kingdom, but under the collective umbrella of the British Empire. Each Dominion also became a founding member of the League of Nations in its own right. This was an important international demonstration of the increasing autonomy of the Dominions.

== The Statute of Westminster ==
During the 1926 Imperial Conference, the governments of the Dominions and of the United Kingdom endorsed the Balfour Declaration of 1926, which declared that the Dominions were autonomous members of the British Empire, equal to each other and to the United Kingdom. The Statute of Westminster 1931 gave legal effect to the Balfour Declaration and other decisions made at the Imperial Conferences. Most importantly, it declared that the Parliament of the United Kingdom no longer had any legislative authority over the Dominions. Previously, the Dominions were legally self-governing colonies of the United Kingdom, and thus had no legal international status. The Statute made the Dominions de jure independent nations.

The Statute took effect immediately over Canada, South Africa and the Irish Free State. However, Australia, New Zealand and Newfoundland had to ratify the Statute through legislation before it would apply to them. Canada also requested certain exemptions from the Statute in regard to the Canadian Constitution.

In 1930, shortly before the Statute was enacted, the Labor Prime Minister James Scullin recommended Sir Isaac Isaacs (then the Chief Justice of Australia) as the Governor-General of Australia, to replace Lord Stonehaven. This was a departure from previous practice whereby the British monarch, acting on the advice of the British prime minister, would offer the Australian prime minister a number of choices for the position. However, the Australian prime minister, acting in line with the principles of the Balfour Declaration permitting Dominion governments to look after their own affairs, insisted on the appointment of Isaacs. Although King George V disapproved of Isaacs, the 1930 Imperial Conference upheld the procedure under the declaration, and so the King appointed Isaacs. The other Dominions supported this demonstration of political independence.

== Adoption ==
=== 1937 bill ===
For a decade after its creation, adoption of the Statute was not seen as a priority for Australian governments. In June 1937, the Lyons government introduced the Statute of Westminster Adoption Bill into the parliament, where it passed its second reading in the House of Representatives. However, the bill lapsed when parliament was dissolved prior to the 1937 federal election. The government promised to reintroduce the bill in the 1937 speech from the throne, but no further action was taken. The issue was occasionally raised in parliament, but adoption was seen as non-urgent.

In introducing the 1937 bill, Attorney-General Robert Menzies said that adopting the Statute had only "relatively minor advantages" and would alter Australia's existing constitutional arrangements "to a very trifling extent". He observed that "the real and administrative legislative independence of Australia has never been challenged since the Commonwealth was created", and said the primary reason for adopting the Statute was to bring Australia "into line uniformly with the other dominions" who had already adopted it.

=== 1942 bill ===
John Curtin, who became prime minister eight weeks before the Imperial Japanese Navy's attack on Pearl Harbor, was finally prompted to adopt the Statute in 1942 after the Fall of Singapore and the sinking of HMS Prince of Wales and HMS Repulse. Prior conservative governments had asserted that British military forces would be able to protect Australia, but Curtin, along with External Affairs Minister Dr H. V. Evatt, thought that focusing on an alliance with the United States would be more valuable.

The immediate impetus for the adoption of the Statute of Westminster was the death sentence imposed on two homosexual Australian sailors for the murder of their crewmate, committed on HMAS Australia in 1942. Since 7 November 1939, the Royal Australian Navy had operated subject to British imperial law, under which the two men were sentenced to death. It was argued that would not have been their sentence if Australian law had applied. The Australian government was only able to have the death sentences commuted by directly petitioning the King, who duly altered the sentences to life imprisonment. Adopting the Statute of Westminster, so that Australia would be able to amend applicable imperial law, avoided a potential repetition of that situation. The men's sentences were later further reduced.

== Provisions of the act ==
The act had just three sections, one setting out the short title, one declaring that the act was to come into operation as soon as it received royal assent, and one declaring that the Statute of Westminster had been adopted, and was considered to have had effect since 3 September 1939, the beginning of World War II. For a simple act, it had a significant effect.

Section 2 of the Statute of Westminster abrogated the effect of the Colonial Laws Validity Act 1865, and adopting it meant that laws made by the Parliament of Australia which were repugnant to British laws were no longer invalid. Section 4 of the Statute provided that laws made by the Parliament of the United Kingdom would only have effect on a Dominion at the request of the government of that Dominion.

Section 5 of the Statute removed British control over merchant shipping in Australian waters. Section 6 removed the British monarch's power to reserve certain legislation for his or her own consideration, rather than simply allowing the Governor-General to give the royal assent on the monarch's behalf.

== See also ==
- Australia Act 1986

Comparable acts asserting ex-Dominion sovereignty

- Canada Act 1982
- Indian Independence Act 1947, Constitution of India, and 1956 Constitution of Pakistan
- Constitution of Ireland
- Statute of Westminster Adoption Act 1947 and Constitution Act 1986, the equivalent in New Zealand
- Status of the Union Act, 1934 and South African Constitution of 1961
- Sri Lankan Constitution of 1972
