= Dominion =

Self-governing countries of the British Empire

A dominion was a self-governing country within the British Empire and then the British Commonwealth of Nations, primarily in the first half of the 20th century. The dominions in 1926 were Australia, Canada, the Irish Free State, New Zealand, Newfoundland, and South Africa; in 1947 India and Pakistan, and in 1948 Ceylon (now Sri Lanka). In the years following the Second World War, the British Empire was refashioned into the more modern and post-colonial Commonwealth of Nations, after which the former dominions were often referred to as the Old Commonwealth. This was formalised by the London Declaration, 1949, by which time the dominions (with the exception of Newfoundland, which had joined Canada) had become independent nation states. By 1952 the United Kingdom no longer used the term dominions in reference to member nations of the Commonwealth.

In 1925, the government of the United Kingdom created the Dominions Office out of the Colonial Office, although for the next five years they shared a secretary in charge. "Dominion status" was first accorded to Australia, Canada, the Irish Free State, New Zealand, Newfoundland, and South Africa at the 1926 Imperial Conference through the Balfour Declaration of 1926, recognising Great Britain and the Dominions as "autonomous communities within the British Empire, equal in status, in no way subordinate one to another in any aspect of their domestic or external affairs, though united by a common allegiance to the Crown and freely associated as members of the British Commonwealth of Nations". Their full legislative independence was subsequently confirmed in the Statute of Westminster 1931. In the 1920s and 1930s, they began to represent themselves in international bodies, in treaty making, and in foreign capitals. Vestiges of empire and colonial rule lasted in some dominions late into the 20th century.

With the transition of the British Empire into the Commonwealth of Nations in the aftermath of the Second World War, it was decided that the term Commonwealth country should formally replace dominion for official Commonwealth usage. This decision was made during the 1949 Commonwealth Prime Ministers' Conference when India was intending to become a republic, so that both types of government could become and remain full members of the Commonwealth. Commonwealth country is thus a successor term to dominion; it referred to both realms (with the King as head of state) and republics (usually with presidents as head of state). After 1949, the term dominion, without its legal dimension, stayed in use for around thirty more years — mostly for some smaller, now Commonwealth-member realms where the British monarch remained as head of state.

== Definition ==
The term dominion means "that which is mastered or ruled". It was used by the British to describe their colonies or territorial possessions.

Use of dominion to refer to a particular territory within the British Empire dates back to the 16th century and was sometimes used to describe Wales from 1535 to around 1800: for instance, the Laws in Wales Act 1535 applies to "the Dominion, Principality and Country of Wales". Dominion, as an official title, was conferred on the Colony of Virginia about 1660 and on the Dominion of New England in 1686.

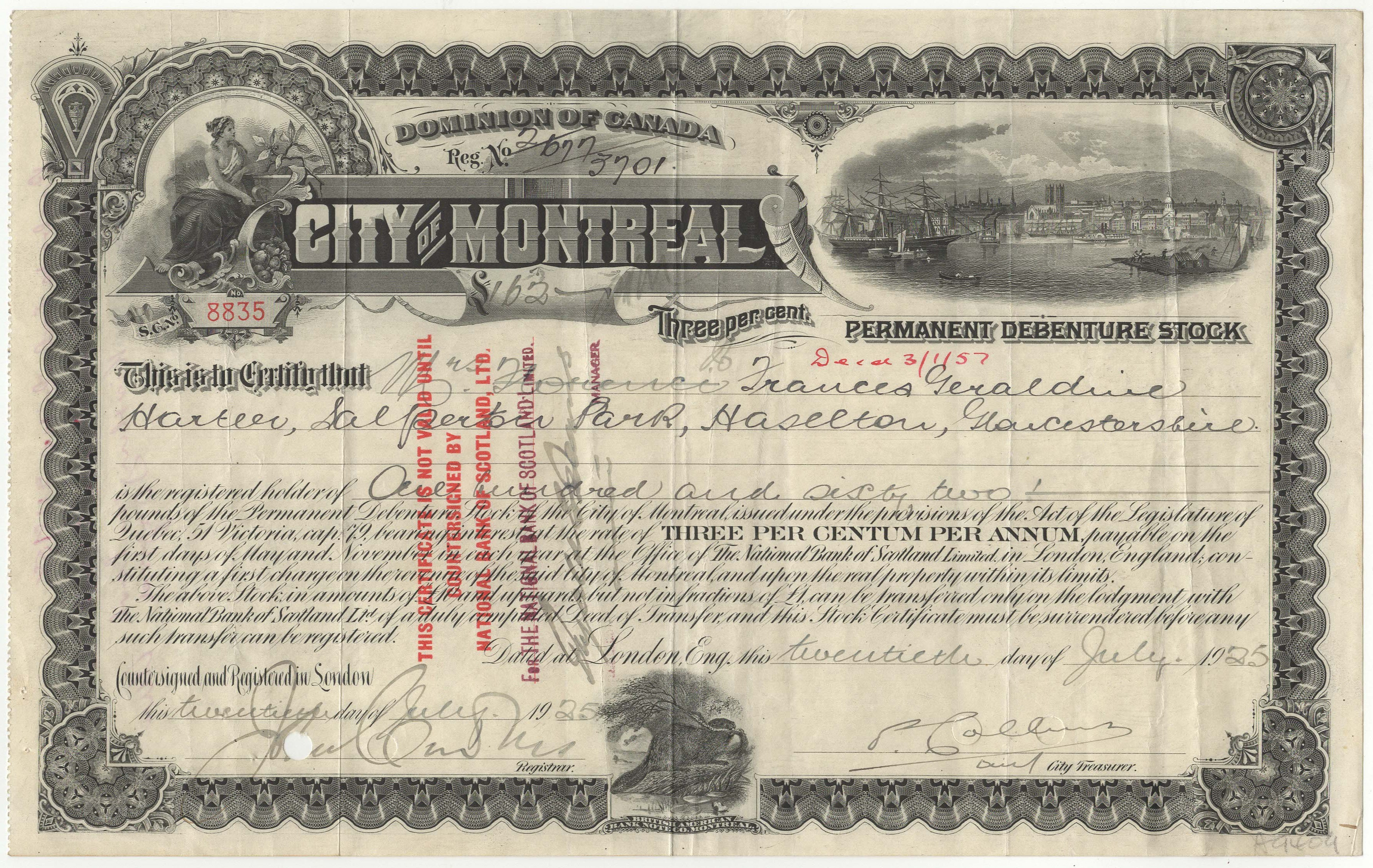
Permanent Debenture Stock of the City of Montreal in the Dominion of Canada, issued 20 July 1925

Under the British North America Act 1867, the partially self-governing colonies of British North America were united into the Dominion of Canada. The new federal and provincial governments split considerable local powers, but Britain retained legislative supremacy, controlled trade, and international policy. At the 1907 Imperial Conference, the self-governing polities of Canada and the Commonwealth of Australia were referred to collectively as Dominions for the first time. Two other self-governing colonies—New Zealand and Newfoundland—were referred to as dominions later that same year. These were followed by the Union of South Africa in 1910. The Order in Council annexing the island of Cyprus in 1914 declared that, from 5 November 1914, the island "shall be annexed to and form part of His Majesty's dominions". Nonetheless, the dominions entered World War I as part of the British Empire and not as separate sovereign states.

Dominion status was formally recognised for Australia, Canada, the Irish Free State, New Zealand, Newfoundland, and South Africa at the 1926 Imperial Conference to designate "autonomous communities within the British Empire, equal in status, in no way subordinate one to another in any aspect of their domestic or external affairs, though united by a common allegiance to the Crown and freely associated as members of the British Commonwealth of Nations".

The British government of Lloyd George had emphasised the use of the capital "D" when referring to the Irish Free State in the Anglo-Irish Treaty to assure it the same constitutional status in order to avoid confusion with the wider term "His Majesty's dominions", which referred to the British Empire as a whole. At the time of the founding of the League of Nations in 1919, the League Covenant made provision for the admission of any "fully self-governing state, Dominion, or Colony", the implication being that "Dominion status was something between that of a colony and a state".

With the adoption of the Statute of Westminster 1931, Britain and the Dominions formed the British Commonwealth of Nations.

Dominions asserted full legislative independence, with direct access to the monarch as head of state previously reserved only for British governments. It also recognised autonomy in foreign affairs, including participation as autonomous countries in the League of Nations with full power over appointing ambassadors to other countries.

Following World War II, the changes in the constitutional relationship between the countries that continued to share a common sovereign with the United Kingdom led to the upper case term Dominion falling out of use. The Dominions Office was formally changed to the Commonwealth Relations Office in 1947.

=== "His/Her Majesty's dominions" ===
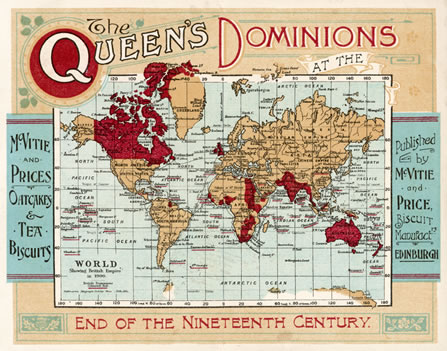
Map of the British Empire under Queen Victoria at the end of the nineteenth century. "The Queen's Dominions" refers to all territories belonging to the Crown.

The status of "Dominion" established by the Statute of Westminster 1931 was capitalised to distinguish it from the more general sense of "within the Crown's dominions".

The phrase the Crown's dominions or His/Her Majesty's dominions is a legal and constitutional phrase that refers to all the realms and territories of the British sovereign, whether independent or not. These territories include the United Kingdom and its colonies, including those that had become Dominions. Dependent territories that had never been annexed and were not colonies of the Crown, were notionally foreign territory and not "within the Crown's dominions". When these territories—including protectorates and protected states (a status with greater powers of self-government), as well as League of Nations mandates (which later became United Nations Trust Territories)—were granted independence and at the same time recognised the British monarch as head of state, the United Kingdom Act granting independence declared that such and such a territory "shall form part of Her Majesty's dominions", and so become part of the territory in which the Queen exercises sovereignty, not merely suzerainty.

Under British nationality law, the status of "Dominion" ceased to exist on January 1, 1949, when it was decided that each Dominion would enact laws pertaining to its own citizenship. However, "Dominion status" itself never ceased to exist within the greater scope of British law, because acts pertaining to "Dominion status", such as the Statute of Westminster 1931, have not been repealed in both the United Kingdom and historic Dominions such as Canada, but countries with Dominion status today are called realms. The term "within the Crown's dominions" continues to apply in British law to those territories in which the British monarch remains head of state, and the term "self-governing dominion" is used in some legislation. When a territory ceases to recognise the monarch as head of state, this status is changed by statute. Thus, for example, the British Ireland Act 1949, recognised that the Republic of Ireland had "ceased to be part of His Majesty's dominions".

== Historical development ==
=== Responsible government: precursor to Dominion status ===
The foundation of "Dominion" status followed the achievement of internal self-rule in British Colonies, in the specific form of full responsible government (as distinct from "representative government"). Colonial responsible government began to emerge during the mid-19th century. The legislatures of Colonies with responsible government were able to make laws in all matters other than foreign affairs, defence and international trade, these being powers which remained with the Parliament of the United Kingdom.

Nova Scotia soon followed by the Province of Canada (which included modern southern Ontario and southern Quebec) were the first colonies to achieve responsible government, in 1848. Prince Edward Island followed in 1851, and New Brunswick and Newfoundland in 1855. All except for Newfoundland and Prince Edward Island agreed to form a new federation named Canada from 1867. This was instituted by the British Parliament in the British North America Act 1867 (see also Canadian Confederation). Section 3 of the act referred to the new entity as a "Dominion", the first such entity to be created. From 1870 the Dominion included two vast neighbouring British territories without self-government: Rupert's Land and the North-Western Territory; together these became over time the current provinces of Manitoba, Saskatchewan, and Alberta, and the three current territories, the Northwest Territories, Yukon and Nunavut. In 1871, the Crown Colony of British Columbia became a Canadian province, as did Prince Edward Island in 1873. Newfoundland, having become a Dominion itself in 1907, was restored to direct British rule in 1934, finally joining Canada in 1949 after referendums.

The conditions under which the four separate Australian colonies—New South Wales, Tasmania, Western Australia, South Australia—and New Zealand could gain full responsible government were set out by the British government in the Australian Constitutions Act 1850. The Act also separated the Colony of Victoria (in 1851) from New South Wales. During 1856, responsible government was achieved by New South Wales, Victoria, South Australia, and Tasmania, and New Zealand. The remainder of New South Wales was divided in three in 1859, a change that established most of the present borders of NSW; the Colony of Queensland, with its own responsible self-government, and the Northern Territory (which was not granted self-government prior to federation of the Australian Colonies). Western Australia did not receive self-government until 1891, mainly because of its continuing financial dependence on the UK government. After protracted negotiations (that initially included New Zealand), six Australian colonies with responsible government (and their dependent territories) agreed to federate, along Canadian lines, becoming the Commonwealth of Australia in 1901.

In South Africa, the Cape Colony became the first British self-governing colony, in 1872. (Until 1893, the Cape Colony also controlled the separate Colony of Natal.) Following the Second Boer War (1899–1902), the British Empire assumed direct control of the Boer Republics, but transferred limited self-government to Transvaal in 1906, and the Orange River Colony in 1907.

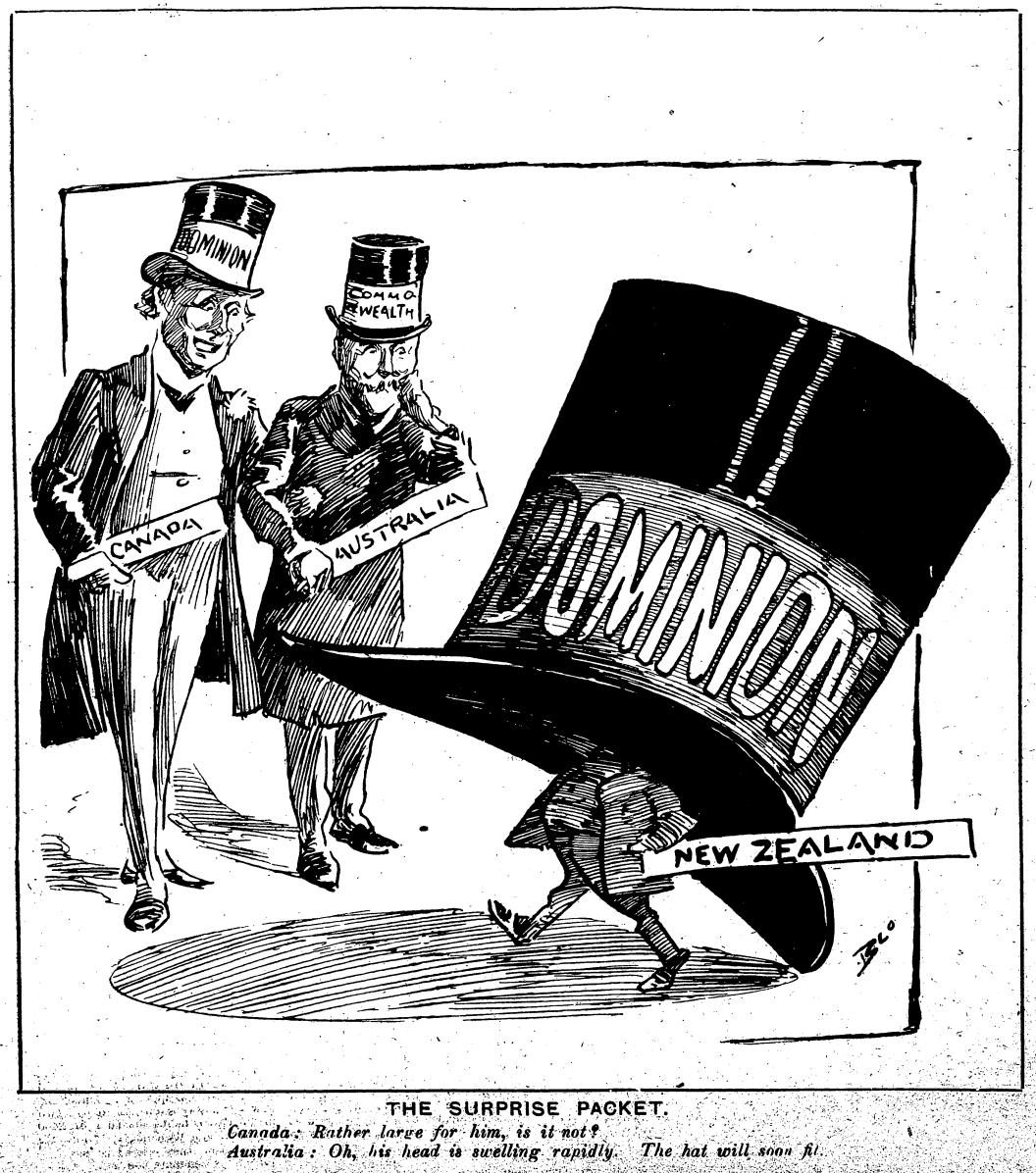
The New Zealand Observer (1907) shows New Zealand Prime Minister Joseph Ward as a pretentious dwarf beneath a massive "Dominion" top hat. The caption reads: The Surprise Packet: Canada: "Rather large for him, is it not?" Australia: "Oh, his head is swelling rapidly. The hat will soon fit."

The Commonwealth of Australia was recognised as a Dominion in 1901, and the Dominion of New Zealand and the Dominion of Newfoundland were officially given Dominion status in 1907, followed by the Union of South Africa in 1910.

=== Canadian Confederation and evolution of the term Dominion ===
In connection with proposals for the future government of British North America, use of the term "Dominion" was suggested by Samuel Leonard Tilley at the London Conference of 1866 discussing the confederation of the Province of Canada (subsequently becoming the provinces of Ontario and Quebec), Nova Scotia and New Brunswick into "One Dominion under the Name of Canada", the first federation internal to the British Empire. Tilley's suggestion was taken from the 72nd Psalm, verse eight, "He shall have dominion also from sea to sea, and from the river unto the ends of the earth", which is echoed in the national motto, "A Mari Usque Ad Mare". The new government of Canada under the British North America Act 1867 began to use the phrase "Dominion of Canada" to designate the new, larger country. However, neither the Confederation nor the adoption of the title of "Dominion" granted extra autonomy or new powers to this new federal level of government. Senator Eugene Forsey wrote that the powers acquired since the 1840s that established the system of responsible government in Canada would simply be transferred to the new Dominion government:

By the time of Confederation in 1867, this system had been operating in most of what is now central and eastern Canada for almost 20 years. The Fathers of Confederation simply continued the system they knew, the system that was already working, and working well.

The constitutional scholar Andrew Heard argues that Confederation did not legally change Canada's colonial status to anything approaching its later status of a Dominion.

At its inception in 1867, Canada's colonial status was marked by political and legal subjugation to British Imperial supremacy in all aspects of government—legislative, judicial, and executive. The Imperial Parliament at Westminster could legislate on any matter to do with Canada and could override any local legislation, the final court of appeal for Canadian litigation lay with the Judicial Committee of the Privy Council in London, the Governor General of Canada had a substantive role as a representative of the British government, and ultimate executive power was vested in the British Monarch — who was advised only by British ministers in its exercise. Canada's independence came about as each of these sub-ordinations was eventually removed.

When the Dominion of Canada was created in 1867, it was granted powers of self-government to deal with all internal matters, but Britain still retained overall legislative supremacy. This Imperial supremacy could be exercised through several statutory measures. In the first place, the British North America Act 1867 provided in Section 55 that the Governor General may reserve any legislation passed by the two Houses of Parliament for "the signification of Her Majesty's pleasure", which is determined according to Section 57 by the British Monarch in Council. Secondly, Section 56 provides that the Governor General must forward to "one of Her Majesty's Principal Secretaries of State" in London a copy of any Federal legislation that has been assented to. Then, within two years after the receipt of this copy, the (British) Monarch in Council could disallow an Act. Thirdly, at least four pieces of Imperial legislation constrained the Canadian legislatures. The Colonial Laws Validity Act 1865 provided that no colonial law could validly conflict with, amend, or repeal Imperial legislation that either explicitly, or by necessary implication, applied directly to that colony. The Merchant Shipping Act 1894, as well as the Colonial Courts of Admiralty Act 1890 required reservation of Dominion legislation on those topics for approval by the British Government. Also, the Colonial Stock Act 1900 provided for the disallowance of any Dominion legislation the British government felt would harm British stockholders of Dominion trustee securities. Most importantly, however, the British Parliament could exercise the legal right of supremacy that it possessed over common law to pass any legislation on any matter affecting the colonies.

For decades, the Dominions did not sign international treaties, nor have their own embassies or consulates in foreign countries. International treaties concerning them were transacted through London. Travel and commerce were transacted through British embassies and consulates. For example, matters concerning visas and lost or stolen passports of Dominion citizens were carried out at British diplomatic offices. In the late 1930s and early 1940s, Dominion governments established their own embassies, the first two of which were established by Australia and Canada in Washington, D.C., in the United States.

Until 1948 any resident of a British colony or Dominion had the status of British subject. In 1935, the Irish Nationality and Citizenship Act created a separate status of Irish national, but stopped short of creating a full citizenship. Canada was the first to create its own citizenship with the Canadian Citizenship Act, 1946, following which the British Nationality Act 1948 created Commonwealth citizenship and the Dominions subsequently created their own citizenships.

As Heard later explained, the British government seldom invoked its powers over Canadian legislation. British legislative powers over Canadian domestic policy were largely theoretical and their exercise was increasingly unacceptable in the 1870s and 1880s. The rise to the status of a Dominion and then full independence for Canada and other possessions of the British Empire did not occur by the granting of titles or similar recognition by the British Parliament but by initiatives taken by the new governments of certain former British dependencies to assert their independence and to establish constitutional precedents.

What is remarkable about this whole process is that it was achieved with a minimum of legislative amendments. Much of Canada's independence arose from the development of new political arrangements, many of which have been absorbed into judicial decisions interpreting the constitution—with or without explicit recognition. Canada's passage from being an integral part of the British Empire to being an independent member of the Commonwealth richly illustrates the way in which fundamental constitutional rules have evolved through the interaction of constitutional convention, international law, and municipal statute and case law.

What was significant about the creation of the Canadian and Australian federations was not that they were instantly granted wide new powers by the Imperial centre at the time of their creation; but that they, because of their greater size and prestige, were better able to exercise their existing powers and lobby for new ones than the various colonies they incorporated could have done separately. They provided a new model which politicians in New Zealand, Newfoundland, South Africa, Ireland, India, Malaysia could point to for their own relationship with Britain. Ultimately, "[Canada's] example of a peaceful accession to independence with a Westminster system of government came to be followed by 50 countries with a combined population of more than 2-billion people."

=== 1907 Imperial Conference ===
Issues of colonial self-government spilled into foreign affairs with the Second Boer War (1899–1902). The self-governing colonies contributed significantly to British efforts to stem the insurrection, but ensured that they set the conditions for participation in these wars. Colonial governments repeatedly acted to ensure that they determined the extent of their participation in imperial wars in the military build-up to the First World War.

The assertiveness of the self-governing countries was recognised in the Imperial Conference of 1907 which, on the motions of the Prime Ministers of Canada and Australia, introduced the idea of the Dominions as self-governing countries by referring to Canada and Australia as Dominions. It also retired the name "Colonial Conference" and mandated that meetings take place regularly to consult the Dominions in running the foreign affairs of the empire.

The Colony of New Zealand, which chose not to take part in Australian federation, became the Dominion of New Zealand on 26 September 1907; Newfoundland became a Dominion on the same day. The Union of South Africa was referred to as a Dominion upon its creation on 31 May 1910.

=== First World War and Treaty of Versailles ===
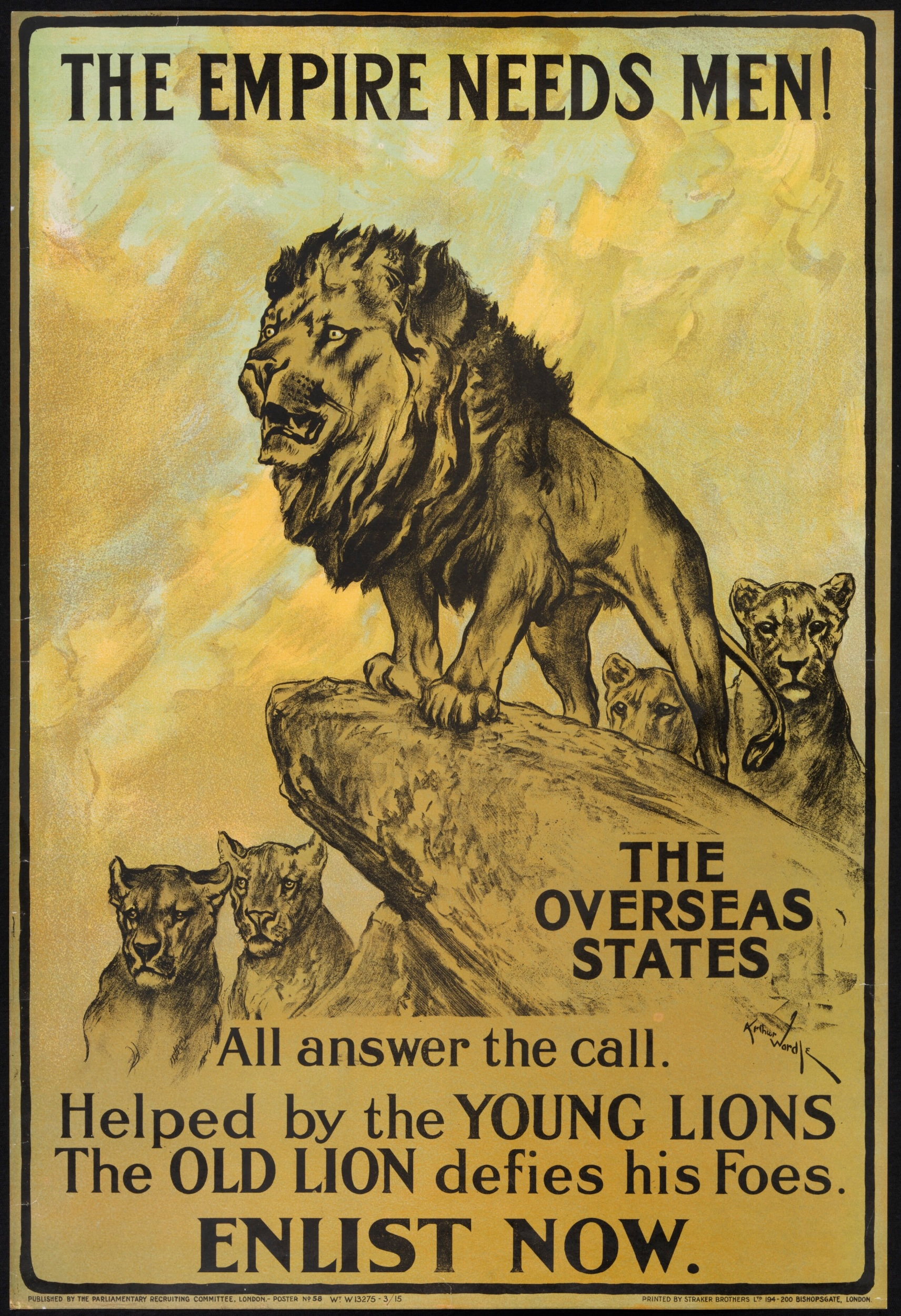
The Parliamentary Recruiting Committee produced this First World War poster. Designed by Arthur Wardle, the poster urges men from the Dominions of the British Empire to enlist in the war effort.

The initiatives and contributions of British colonies to the British war effort in the First World War were recognised by Britain with the creation of the Imperial War Cabinet in 1917, which gave them a say in the running of the war. Dominion status as self-governing states, as opposed to symbolic titles granted various British colonies, waited until 1919, when the self-governing Dominions signed the Treaty of Versailles independently of the British government and became individual members of the League of Nations. This ended the purely colonial status of the Dominions.

=== Irish Free State ===
The Irish Free State, set up in 1922 after the Anglo-Irish War, was the second Dominion to appoint a non-UK born, non-aristocratic Governor-General when Tim Healy, following the tenures of Sir Walter Edward Davidson and Sir William Allardyce in Newfoundland, took the position in 1922. Dominion status was never popular in the Irish Free State where people saw it as a face-saving measure for a British government unable to countenance a republic in what had previously been the United Kingdom of Great Britain and Ireland. Successive Irish governments undermined the constitutional links with the United Kingdom. In 1937, Ireland, as it renamed itself, adopted a new republican constitution that included powers for a president of Ireland. At the same time, a law delegating functions to the King, not as King in Ireland but as the symbol of the co-operation amongst Commonwealth countries with which Ireland associated itself, continued to apply in external relations. The last statutory functions of the King with respect to Ireland were abolished in 1949.

=== Balfour Declaration of 1926 and Statute of Westminster ===
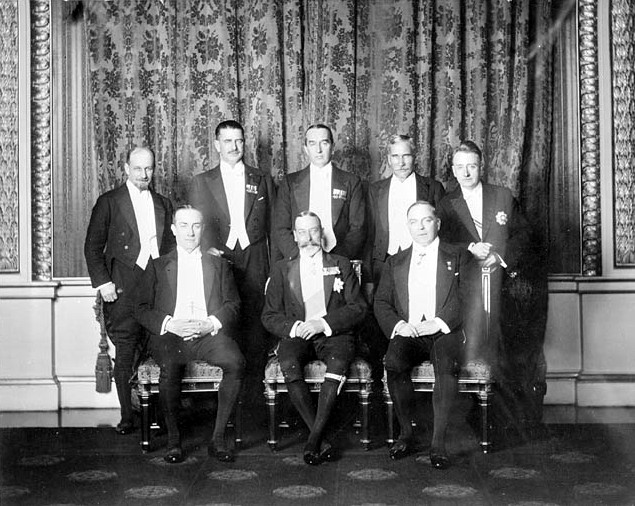
King George V (front, centre) and his prime ministers at the 1926 Imperial Conference

The Balfour Declaration of 1926, and the subsequent Statute of Westminster, 1931, restricted Britain's ability to pass or affect laws outside of its own jurisdiction.

Until 1931, Newfoundland was referred to as a colony of the United Kingdom, as for example, in the 1927 reference to the Judicial Committee of the Privy Council to delineate the Quebec-Labrador boundary. Full autonomy was granted by the United Kingdom parliament with the Statute of Westminster in December 1931.

By the request of Australia and New Zealand, the Statute of Westminster was not applied automatically to those two Dominions until their own parliaments confirmed it. Being economically close to Britain and dependent on it for defence, they did not do so until 1942 for Australia and 1947 for New Zealand.

In 1934, following Newfoundland's economic collapse, and with the approval of its own legislature, Britain suspended self-government in Newfoundland and instituted a "Commission of Government", which continued until Newfoundland became a province of Canada in 1949.

==== White Dominions ====
Australia, Canada, the Irish Free State, New Zealand, Newfoundland, and South Africa (prior to becoming a republic and temporarily leaving the Commonwealth in 1961), with their large populations of European descent, were sometimes collectively referred to as the "White Dominions".

== Dominions ==
=== List of Dominions ===
Country	From	To (Note: There was no single constitutional or legislative change that abolished the status of "dominions". The accession proclamation of 1952 referred to "realms", and the Royal Style and Titles Acts of 1953 changed references to "dominions" in the monarch's titles in the various Dominions to "realms", after which the term dominion generally fell into disuse, and the countries sharing the same monarch as the United Kingdom came to be referred to as realms (with the possible exception of Canada; see also Name of Canada).)	Status
Canada	1867		Continues as a Commonwealth realm. Dominion was conferred as the country's title in the 1867 constitution, as a substitute for the title of "kingdom".
Australia	1901		Continues as a Commonwealth realm.
New Zealand	1907		Continues as a Commonwealth realm.
Newfoundland	1907	1949	The colony of Newfoundland enjoyed responsible government from 1855 to 1907 when it became a Dominion. Following the recommendations of a Royal Commission, and at the request of the Legislative Assembly and Legislative Council of Newfoundland, parliamentary government was suspended in 1934, due to severe financial difficulties resulting from the depression and a series of riots against the Newfoundland government in 1932. In 1934, Newfoundland reverted to direct British rule, governed by an unelected commission of government appointed by the British government. In 1949, it joined Canada and the legislature was restored after 16 years of direct rule by Britain.
South Africa	1910	1961	Continued as a monarchy until it became a republic in 1961 under the Republic of South Africa Constitution Act 1961, passed by the Parliament of South Africa, long title "To constitute the Republic of South Africa and to provide for matters incidental thereto", assented to 24 April 1961 to come into operation on 31 May 1961.
Irish Free State (1922–1937) Éire (1937–1949) (Note: The Irish Free State was renamed Éire in Irish or Ireland in English in December 1937. From December 1937 to April 1949, the Dominion was usually referred to as Eire by the British government. See also Names of the Irish state.)	1922	1949	The link with the monarchy ceased for most of Ireland with the passage of the Republic of Ireland Act 1948, which came into force on 18 April 1949 and declared that the state was a republic, popularly known henceforth as the Republic of Ireland. Northern Ireland, which came into being in 1921, has remained within the United Kingdom.
India	1947	1950	The Union of India became a federal republic after its constitution came into effect on 26 January 1950. India became the first Commonwealth republic.
Pakistan (incl. East Pakistan, but excl. Gwadar)	1947	1956	Continued as a monarchy until 23 March 1956 when it became a republic under the name "The Islamic Republic of Pakistan": Constitution of 1956.
Ceylon	1948	1972	Continued as a monarchy until 1972 when it became a republic under the name of Sri Lanka.

=== Australia ===
Four colonies of Australia had enjoyed responsible government since 1856: New South Wales, Victoria, Tasmania and South Australia. Queensland had responsible government soon after its founding in 1859. Because of ongoing financial dependence on Britain, Western Australia became the last Australian colony to attain self-government in 1890. During the 1890s, the colonies voted to unite and in 1901 they were federated under the British Crown as the Commonwealth of Australia by the Commonwealth of Australia Constitution Act. The Constitution of Australia had been drafted in Australia and approved by popular consent. Thus Australia is one of the few countries established by a popular vote. Under the Balfour Declaration of 1926, the federal government was regarded as coequal with (and not subordinate to) the British and other Dominion governments, and this was given formal legal recognition in 1942 (when the Statute of Westminster was adopted retroactively to the commencement of the Second World War in 1939). In 1930, the Australian prime minister, James Scullin, reinforced the right of the overseas Dominions to appoint native-born governors-general, when he advised King George V to appoint Sir Isaac Isaacs as his representative in Australia, against the wishes of the opposition and officials in London. The governments of the states (colonies before 1901) remained under the Commonwealth but retained links to the UK until the passage of the Australia Act 1986.

=== Canada ===
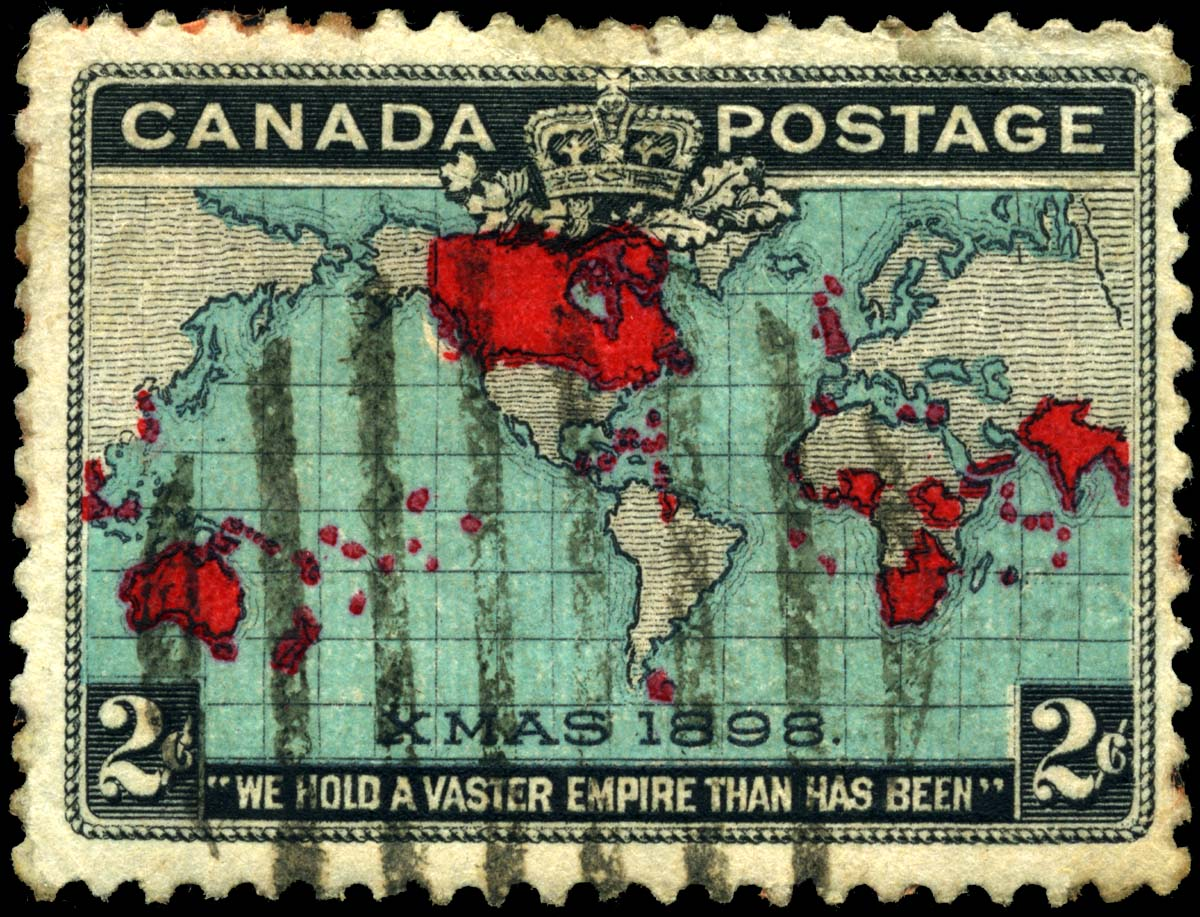
Dominion of Canada Postage Stamp, 1898

The term Dominion is employed in the Constitution Act, 1867 (originally the British North America Act 1867), and describes the resulting political union. Specifically, the preamble of the act states: "Whereas the Provinces of Canada, Nova Scotia, and New Brunswick have expressed their Desire to be federally united into One Dominion under the Crown of the United Kingdom of Great Britain and Ireland, with a Constitution similar in Principle to that of the United Kingdom ..." Furthermore, Sections 3 and 4 indicate that the provinces "shall form and be One Dominion under the Name of Canada; and on and after that Day those Three Provinces shall form and be One Dominion under that Name accordingly".

According to the Canadian Encyclopedia (1999), "The word came to be applied to the federal government and Parliament, and under the Constitution Act, 1982, 'Dominion' remains Canada's official title."

Usage of the phrase Dominion of Canada was employed as the country's name after 1867, predating the general use of the term Dominion as applied to the other autonomous regions of the British Empire after 1907. The phrase Dominion of Canada does not appear in the 1867 act nor in the Constitution Act, 1982, but does appear in the Constitution Act, 1871, other contemporaneous texts, and subsequent bills. References to the Dominion of Canada in later acts, such as the Statute of Westminster, do not clarify the point because all nouns were formally capitalised in British legislative style.

Frank Scott theorised that Canada's status as a Dominion ended when Canadian parliament declared war on Germany on 9 September 1939, separately and distinctly from the United Kingdom's declaration of war six days earlier. By the 1950s, the term Dominion of Canada was no longer used by the United Kingdom, which considered Canada a "Realm of the Commonwealth". The government of Louis St. Laurent ended the practice of using Dominion in the statutes of Canada in 1951. This began the phasing out of the use of Dominion, which had been used largely as a synonym of "federal" or "national" such as "Dominion building" for a post office, "Dominion-provincial relations", and so on. The last major change was renaming the national holiday from Dominion Day to Canada Day in 1982. Official bilingualism laws also contributed to the disuse of Dominion, as it has no acceptable equivalent in French.

While the term may be found in older official documents, and the Dominion Carillonneur still tolls at Parliament Hill, it is now hardly used to distinguish the federal government from the provinces or (historically) Canada before and after 1867. Nonetheless, the federal government continues to produce publications and educational materials that specify the currency of these official titles. The Constitution Act, 1982 does not mention and does not remove the title, and therefore a constitutional amendment may be required to change it.

The word Dominion has been used with other agencies, laws, and roles:

- Dominion Day (1867–1982): holiday marking Canada's national day; now called Canada Day
- Dominion Police (1867–1920): merged to form the Royal Canadian Mounted Police (RCMP)
- Dominion Lands Act (1872): federal lands act; repealed in 1930
- Dominion Observatory (1905–1970): weather observatory in Ottawa; now used as Office of Energy Efficiency, Energy Branch, Natural Resources Canada
- Dominion Carillonneur: official responsible for playing the carillons at the Peace Tower since 1916
- Dominion Bureau of Statistics (1918–1971): superseded by Statistics Canada
- Dominion Astrophysical Observatory (1918–present); now part of the National Research Council Herzberg Institute of Astrophysics
- Dominion Radio Astrophysical Observatory (1960–present); now part of the National Research Council Herzberg Institute of Astrophysics

Notable Canadian corporations and organisations (not affiliated with government) that have used Dominion as a part of their name have included:

- Dominion of Canada Rifle Association founded in 1868 and incorporated by an Act of Parliament in 1890
- The Dominion Bank, opened 1871
  - The Toronto-Dominion Bank, its successor since a 1955 merger with the Bank of Toronto; as of 2016 one of the country's major banks
- The Dominion of Canada General Insurance Company, founded in 1887; bought out by Travelers in 2013
- The Dominion Atlantic Railway, in Nova Scotia, formed by the 1894 merger of two railways; controlled by the Canadian Pacific Railway after 1911, shut down in 1994
- Dominion Stores, a supermarket chain founded in 1927; following a series of acquisitions the last Dominion stores were renamed as Metro stores in 2008
- The Dominion Institute, created in 1997 to promote awareness of Canadian history and national identity
  - The Historica-Dominion Institute, its successor following a 2009 merger with the Historica Foundation; renamed Historica Canada in 2013

=== Ceylon ===
Ceylon, which, as a Crown colony, was originally promised "fully responsible status within the British Commonwealth of Nations", was formally granted independence as a Dominion in 1948. In 1972, it adopted a republican constitution to become the Free, Sovereign and Independent Republic of Sri Lanka. By a new constitution in 1978, it became the Democratic Socialist Republic of Sri Lanka.

=== India and Pakistan ===
British India acquired a partially representative government by the Indian Councils Act 1909, and the first Parliament was introduced by the Government of India Act 1919. Discussions on the further devolution of power, and granting of Dominion status, continued through the 1920s, with the Commonwealth of India Bill 1925, Simon Commission 1927–1930, and Nehru Report 1928 being often cited proposals. Further powers were eventually devolved, following the 1930–1932 Round Table Conferences, to the locally elected legislatures, via the Government of India Act 1935. The Cripps Mission of 1942 proposed the further devolution of powers, within Dominion status, to the political leadership of British India. Cripps's plan was rejected and full independence was sought. Pakistan (including Muslim-majority East Bengal forming East Pakistan) seceded from India at the point of Indian independence with the passage of the Indian Independence Act 1947 and ensuing partition, resulting in two dominions. For India, dominion status was transitory until its new republican constitution was drafted and promulgated in 1950. Pakistan remained a dominion until it became an Islamic republic under its 1956 constitution. East Pakistan gained independence from Pakistan through Liberation War, as Bangladesh, in 1971.

=== Irish Free State / Ireland ===
The Irish Free State (Ireland from 1937) was a British Dominion between 1922 and 1949. As established by the Irish Free State Constitution Act 1922 of the United Kingdom Parliament on 6 December 1922, the new state—which had Dominion status in the likeness of that enjoyed by Canada within the British Commonwealth of Nations—comprised the whole of Ireland. However, provision was made in the act for the Parliament of Northern Ireland to opt out of inclusion in the Irish Free State, which—as had been widely expected at the time—it duly did one day after the creation of the new state, on 7 December 1922.

Following a plebiscite of the people of the Irish Free State held on 1 July 1937, a new constitution came into force on 29 December of that year, establishing a successor state with the name of "Ireland" which ceased to participate in Commonwealth conferences and events. Nevertheless, the United Kingdom and other member states of the Commonwealth continued to regard Ireland as a Dominion owing to the unusual role accorded to the King under the Irish Executive Authority (External Relations) Act 1936. Ultimately, however, Ireland's Oireachtas passed The Republic of Ireland Act 1948, which came into force on 18 April 1949 and unequivocally ended Ireland's links with the British Monarch and the Commonwealth. This act was recognised by the United Kingdom in the Ireland Act 1949.

=== New Zealand ===
The New Zealand Constitution Act 1852 gave New Zealand its own Parliament (General Assembly) and home rule in 1852. In 1907 New Zealand was proclaimed the Dominion of New Zealand. New Zealand, Canada, and Newfoundland used the word Dominion in the official title of the state, whereas Australia used Commonwealth of Australia, and South Africa used Union of South Africa. New Zealand adopted the Statute of Westminster in 1947 and in the same year legislation passed in London gave New Zealand full powers to amend its own constitution. In 1986, the New Zealand parliament passed the Constitution Act 1986, which repealed the New Zealand Constitution Act 1852 and the last constitutional links with the United Kingdom, formally ending its Dominion status.

=== Newfoundland ===
In 1934, after a series of financial difficulties (owing in part to Newfoundland's railway debt from the 1890s, and its debt from the First World War, both of which were exacerbated by the collapse of fish prices during the Great Depression) and a riot against the elected government, Newfoundland voluntarily relinquished its elected parliament and autonomy, becoming a dependent territory of the British Empire until 1949. During these 15 years, Newfoundland was ruled by the Newfoundland Commission of Government, an unelected body of civil servants who were directly subordinate to the British Government in London, under the authority of a British statute, the Newfoundland Act 1933. Despite the suspension of its legislature, and its de facto loss of Dominion status, Newfoundland continued to be regarded during these 15 years as a de jure Dominion—evidently shown by the fact that Newfoundland continued to be a responsibility of the Dominions Office in London—the intention of its commission of government not only to deal with Newfoundland's affairs, and dire economic situation, but to prepare the populace for the day that the legislature would be reconvened, and nationhood thus resumed. After two referendums in 1948, Newfoundlanders rejected both the continuance of the Newfoundland Commission of Government and return to responsible government, voting instead to join Canada as its 10th province. This was achieved under the British North America Act 1949 (now known as the Newfoundland Act), which was passed in the Parliament of the United Kingdom on 23 March 1949, prior to the London Declaration of 28 April 1949.

=== South Africa ===
The Union of South Africa was formed in 1910 from the four self-governing colonies of the Cape Colony, Natal, the Transvaal, and the Orange River Colony (the last two were former Boer republics). The South Africa Act 1909 provided for a Parliament consisting of a Senate and a House of Assembly. The provinces had their own legislatures. In 1961, the Union of South Africa adopted a new constitution, became a republic, left the Commonwealth (and re-joined following end of apartheid rule on 1 June 1994), and became the present-day Republic of South Africa.

=== Southern Rhodesia ===
Southern Rhodesia (Zimbabwe since 1980), coloured red on a map of Africa

Southern Rhodesia was a special case in the British Empire. Although it was never a Dominion de jure, it was treated as a Dominion in many respects, and came to be regarded as a de facto Dominion. Southern Rhodesia was formed in 1923 out of territories of the British South Africa Company and established as a self-governing colony with substantial autonomy on the model of the Dominions. The imperial authorities in London retained direct powers over foreign affairs, constitutional alterations, native administration and bills regarding mining revenues, railways and the governor's salary.

Southern Rhodesia was not one of the territories that were mentioned in the 1931 Statute of Westminster although relations with Southern Rhodesia were administered in London through the Dominions Office, not the Colonial Office. When the Dominions were first treated as foreign countries by London for the purposes of diplomatic immunity in 1952, Southern Rhodesia was included in the list of territories concerned. This semi-Dominion status continued in Southern Rhodesia between 1953 and 1963, when it joined Northern Rhodesia and Nyasaland for the formation of the Federation of Rhodesia and Nyasaland, with the latter two territories continuing to be British protectorates. When Northern Rhodesia was given independence in 1964 it adopted the new name of Zambia, prompting Southern Rhodesia to shorten its name to Rhodesia, but Britain did not recognise this latter change.

Rhodesia unilaterally declared independence from Britain in 1965 as a result of the British government's insistence on no independence before majority rule (NIBMAR). London regarded this declaration as illegal, and applied sanctions and expelled Rhodesia from the sterling area. Rhodesia continued with its Dominion-style constitution until 1970, and continued to issue British passports to its citizens. The Rhodesian government continued to profess its loyalty to the Queen, despite being in a state of rebellion against Her Majesty's Government in London, until 1970, when it adopted a republican constitution following a referendum the previous year. This endured until the state's reconstitution as Zimbabwe Rhodesia in 1979 under the terms of the Internal Settlement; this lasted until the Lancaster House Agreement of December 1979, which put it under interim British rule while fresh elections were held. The country achieved independence deemed legal by the international community in April 1980, when Britain granted independence under the name Zimbabwe.

== From Dominions to Commonwealth realms ==
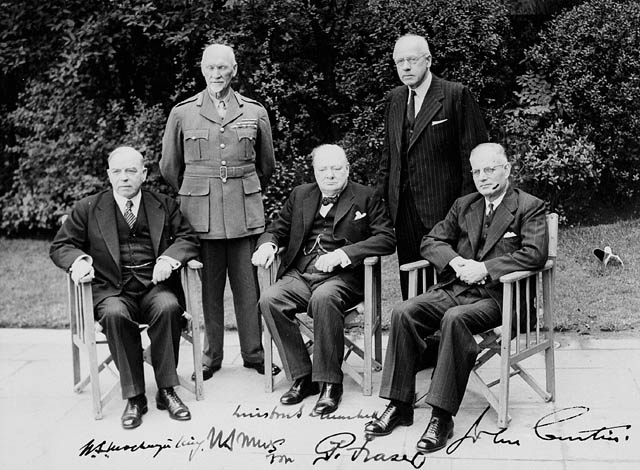
The prime ministers of Britain and the four major Dominions at the 1944 Commonwealth Prime Ministers' Conference. Left to right: William Lyon Mackenzie King (Canada); Jan Smuts (South Africa); Winston Churchill (UK); Peter Fraser (New Zealand); John Curtin (Australia)

Initially, the Dominions conducted their own trade policy, some limited foreign relations and had autonomous armed forces, although the British government claimed and exercised the exclusive power to declare wars. However, after the passage of the Statute of Westminster the language of dependency on the Crown of the United Kingdom ceased, where the Crown itself was no longer referred to as the Crown of any place in particular but simply as "the Crown". Arthur Berriedale Keith, in Speeches and Documents on the British Dominions 1918–1931, stated that "the Dominions are sovereign international States in the sense that the King in respect of each of His Dominions (Newfoundland excepted) is such a State in the eyes of international law". After then, those countries that were previously referred to as "Dominions" became Commonwealth realms where the sovereign reigns no longer as the British monarch, but as monarch of each country in its own right, and are considered equal to the UK and one another.

The Second World War, which fatally undermined Britain's already weakened commercial and financial leadership, further loosened the political ties between Britain and the Dominions. Australian Prime Minister John Curtin's unprecedented action (February 1942) in successfully countermanding an order from British Prime Minister Winston Churchill that Australian troops be diverted to defend British-held Burma (the 7th Division was then en route from the Middle East to Australia to defend against an expected Japanese invasion) demonstrated that Dominion governments might no longer subordinate their own national interests to British strategic perspectives. To ensure that Australia had full legal power to act independently, particularly in relation to foreign affairs, defence industry and military operations, and to validate its past independent action in these areas, Australia formally adopted the Statute of Westminster in October 1942 and backdated the adoption to the start of the war in September 1939.

The Dominions Office merged with the India Office as the Commonwealth Relations Office upon the independence of India and Pakistan in August 1947. The last country officially made a Dominion was Ceylon in 1948.

When the British Nationality Act 1948 entered into force on 1 January 1949, the former Dominions became fully independent, and adopted their own legislation governing nationality. In British nationality law, the Dominions were then referred to as "independent Commonwealth countries"; other former British dependencies that joined the Commonwealth were added to the list of "independent Commonwealth Countries" as they gained independence.

Ireland ceased to be a member of the Commonwealth on 18 April 1949, upon the coming into force of the Republic of Ireland Act 1948. This formally signalled the end of the former dependencies' common constitutional connection to the British Crown. India also adopted a republican constitution in January 1950. Unlike many dependencies that became republics, Ireland never re-joined the Commonwealth, which agreed to accept the British monarch as head of that association of independent states (although most of the individual countries had become republics).

The independence of the separate realms was emphasised after the accession of Queen Elizabeth II in 1952, when she was proclaimed not just as Queen of the United Kingdom, but also Queen of Canada, Queen of Australia, Queen of New Zealand, Queen of South Africa, and of all her other "realms and territories" etc. This also reflected the change from Dominion to realm; in the proclamation of Queen Elizabeth II's new titles in 1953, the phrase "of her other Realms and Territories" replaced "Dominion" with another mediaeval French word with the same connotation, "realm" (from royaume). Thus, recently, when referring to one of those fifteen countries within the Commonwealth of Nations that share the same monarch, the phrase Commonwealth realm has come into common usage instead of Dominion to differentiate the Commonwealth nations that continue to share the monarch as head of state (Australia, Canada, New Zealand, Jamaica, etc.) from those that do not (India, Pakistan, South Africa, etc.). The term "Dominion" is still found in the Canadian constitution where it appears numerous times, but it is largely a vestige of the past, as the Canadian government does not actively use it (see Canada section). The term "realm" does not appear in the Canadian constitution.

The practice of designating a diplomatic representative named "High Commissioner" (instead of "ambassador") for communication between the government of a Dominion and the British government in London continues in respect of members of the Commonwealth, including those that were never Dominions and those that have become republics.

=== Newly independent territories sometimes referred to as Dominions ===
The term "Dominion" remained in informal use for some years when relating to newly independent territories and was sometimes used to refer to the status of former British territories during an immediate post-independence period while the British monarch remained head of state, and the form of government a Westminster-style parliamentary democracy. The legal status of Dominion in British nationality law had ceased to exist on 1 January 1949. However, leaders of the independence movements sometimes called for Dominion status as one stage in the negotiations for independence (for example, Kwame Nkrumah of Ghana). Moreover, while these independent states retained the British monarch as head of state, they remained "within the Crown's dominions" in British law, leading to the confusion of terminology. These constitutions were typically replaced by republican constitutions within a few years.

After World War II, Britain attempted to repeat the Dominion model in decolonising the Caribbean. ... Though several colonies, such as Guyana and Trinidad and Tobago, maintained their formal allegiance to the British monarch, they soon revised their status to become republics. Britain also attempted to establish a Dominion model in decolonising Africa, but it, too, was unsuccessful. ... Ghana, the first former colony declared a Dominion in 1957, soon demanded recognition as a republic. Other African nations followed a similar pattern throughout the 1960s: Kenya, Malawi, Nigeria, Tanganyika, and Uganda. In fact, only the Gambia, Mauritius, and Sierra Leone retained their Dominion status for more than three years.

As the above quote indicates, the term Dominion was sometimes applied in Africa to Ghana (formerly the Gold Coast) during the period from 1957 until 1960, when it became the Republic of Ghana; Nigeria from 1960 until 1963, when it became the Federal Republic of Nigeria; Uganda from 1962 to 1963; Kenya, from 1963 to 1964; Tanganyika from 1961 to 1962, after which it became a republic and then merged with the former British protectorate of Zanzibar to become Tanzania; the Gambia from 1965 until 1970; Sierra Leone from 1961 to 1971; and Mauritius from 1968 to 1992. Malta also retained the Queen as head of state from 1964 to 1974 under the name of State of Malta. The term was also applied to Fiji upon independence. Similar occasional references to Barbados (which retained the Queen as head of state from 1966 to 2021) as a "dominion" can be found in publications as late as the 1970s.

== See also ==
- Changes in British sovereignty
- Colonization
- Timeline of national independence

== Notes ==
- Buckley, F. H. (2014). The Once and Future King: The Rise of Crown Government in America. New York: Encounter Books. ISBN 978-1-59403-719-1. OCLC 855580605.
- Choudry, Sujit. 2001 (?). "Constitution Acts" (based on looseleaf by Hogg, Peter W.). Constitutional Keywords. University of Alberta, Centre for Constitutional Studies: Edmonton.
- Holland, R. F. (1981). Britain and the Commonwealth Alliance 1918–1939. London: Macmillan. ISBN 978-0-333-27295-4. OCLC 7677808. OL 10495276M.
- Forsey, E. A. (2005). How Canadians Govern Themselves (PDF) (6th ed.). Ottawa: Her Majesty the Queen in Right of Canada. ISBN 978-0-662-39689-5. OCLC 61498226. Archived (PDF) from the original on 6 January 2018.
- Martin, R. (November 1994). "A Lament for British North America". The Machray Review. No. 5. The Prayer Book Society of Canada. Archived from the original on 17 October 2005.
