= South African Constitution of 1961 =

Fundamental law of South Africa from 1961 to 1984

Republic of South Africa Constitution Act, 1961

Parliament of South Africa
- Long title: Act to constitute the Republic of South Africa and to provide for matters incidental thereto.
- Citation: Act No. 32 of 1961
- Enacted by: Parliament of South Africa
- Royal assent: 24 April 1961
- Commenced: 31 May 1961
- Repealed: 3 September 1984

Repeals
- South Africa Act, 1909; Official Languages of the Union Act, 1925; Status of the Union Act, 1934; His Majesty King Edward the Eighth's Abdication Act, 1937

Repealed by
- Republic of South Africa Constitution Act, 1983
- Status: Repealed

The Constitution of 1961 (formally the Republic of South Africa Constitution Act, 1961) was the fundamental law of South Africa for two decades. Under the terms of the constitution South Africa ceased to be a Commonwealth realm and became a republic temporarily outside the Commonwealth, until rejoining the Commonwealth of Nations in 1994.

Legally, the Union of South Africa, which had existed since 1910, came to an end and was re-established as the "Republic of South Africa".

== Background ==
Republicanism was always a major tenet of Afrikaner nationalism. Even when nationalists controlled the government, however, political realities prevented this goal from being attained until the 1960s.

On 3 August 1960, the National Party government announced a referendum would be held in October of that year so that voters might vote on the question of whether the Union of South Africa should become a republic. The vote was restricted to white South Africans, the first such election on a national scale, following the disenfranchisement of Coloured South Africans in the Cape Province. More than 90% of eligible voters participated in the referendum, and 52.3% of votes were in favour of "a Republic for the Union."

The Republic of South Africa Constitution Bill was introduced in January 1961, and came into force on 31 May 1961, a significant date in South African history as the Treaty of Vereeniging was signed on 31 May 19 1902, and the Union of South Africa came into being on 31 May 1910.

== Contents ==
The structure of the government of the Republic under the 1961 Constitution was a Westminster system very similar to that of the Union under the South Africa Act 1909, except that the Queen and the appointed governor-general were replaced by a state president elected by Parliament in the form of an electoral college.

C. R. Swart, the last Governor-General of South Africa, became the first ceremonial State President of South Africa on 31 May 1961.

=== Executive ===
The executive power was formally vested in the State President of South Africa, who as head of state had all powers previously belonging to the monarch or the Governor-General of South Africa. The role of the State President was largely ceremonial, as he was required to act on the advice of the Cabinet. Actual executive power rested with the prime minister, who was head of government.

The State President was elected, for a non-renewable seven-year term, by a joint sitting of Parliament as an electoral college in which each senator or member of the House of Assembly had one vote. He could be removed for misconduct or incapacity by resolutions passed by both houses of Parliament after an investigation by joint committee. When the office of State President was vacant, the President of the Senate of South Africa would serve as Acting State President under the terms of a dormant commission.

The State President would appoint a cabinet (formally the Executive Council) consisting of members of the Senate and the House of Assembly. The Westminster constitutional conventions that had applied under the Union were preserved by the 1961 Constitution, so in effect the State President was required to appoint a prime minister and cabinet that commanded the support of the House of Assembly; commonly the prime minister would be the leader of the majority party, which was the National Party (South Africa) National Party.

=== Parliament ===
The legislative power was vested in Parliament, which consisted of the House of Assembly (the lower house) and the Senate (the upper house). Parliament sat in Cape Town and was required to meet at least once a year. The last parliament of the Union elected in 1958 would continue as the first parliament of the new Republic.

The House of Assembly consisted of 150 members elected by white voters from single-member electoral divisions using first-past-the-post voting, six members elected by white voters in South West Africa, and four members elected by Cape Coloured voters in the Cape Province. (The number of ordinary members was increased to 160 in 1966 and to 165 in 1974; the coloured representative members were removed in 1970, and the members representing South West Africa in 1977.)

The House of Assembly was elected for a five-year term, but could be dissolved early by the state president, acting on the advice of the cabinet. The senate consisted of:

1. Eight senators, two from each province, nominated by the state president.
2. For each province, one senator for every ten electoral divisions in the province, but at least eight senators per province. These senators were elected jointly by the members of the House of Assembly elected from the province and the members of the provincial council, using a single transferable vote system of proportional representation.
3. One senator nominated by the state president to represent the coloured people in the Cape Province. (This senator was removed in 1970).
4. Four Senators to represent South West Africa (SWA). Two were nominated by the state president and two were elected jointly by the Legislative Assembly of South West Africa and the six members of the House of Assembly elected from SWA. (These senators were removed in 1977.)

Elected senators held office for a term of five years, while nominated senators held office until a change of government in which a new prime minister was appointed. The whole senate could also be dissolved within 120 days after the dissolution of the House of Assembly. The Senate was permanently abolished in 1981 and replaced by the President's Council.

Bills passed by both Houses of Parliament would become law when assented to by the state president on the advice of the cabinet, and if he refused assent he could return the bill to Parliament with proposed amendments. Once assented to, no court had the power to review the validity of an Act of Parliament unless it affected one of the entrenched clauses of the constitution.

=== Provinces ===
The provincial governments were continued essentially unchanged. The administrator of each province was appointed for a five-year term by the state president. The provincial council was elected by white voters from single-member electoral divisions using first-past-the-post voting.

In the Cape and Transvaal, the provincial councils consisted of the same number of members as the number of members of the House of Assembly elected from the province, elected from the same electoral divisions. In Natal and the Orange Free State, which each elected less than twenty-five members of the House of Assembly, the provincial councils consisted of twenty-five members. The provincial council elected four members who, with the administrator, formed an executive council for the province.

=== Other provisions ===
While the South Africa Act 1909 had made English and Dutch the official languages of South Africa, with Dutch defined to include Afrikaans under the Official Languages of the Union Act, 1925, the 1961 Constitution made English and Afrikaans the official languages and defined Afrikaans to include Dutch.

This clause was entrenched by the requirement that it could only be amended by an absolute majority of two-thirds of senators and members of the House of Assembly sitting together in joint session.

== See also ==
- South African republic referendum, 1960
- Status of the Union Act, 1934

Comparable acts asserting ex-Dominion sovereignty

- Statute of Westminster Adoption Act 1942 and Australia Act 1986
- Canada Act 1982
- Indian Independence Act 1947, Constitution of India, and 1956 Constitution of Pakistan
- Constitution of Ireland
- Statute of Westminster Adoption Act 1947 and Constitution Act 1986, the equivalent in New Zealand
- Sri Lankan Constitution of 1972
