= Canada Act 1982 =

Canadian constitutional enactment

Canada Act 1982 Loi de 1982 sur le Canada

Part of the Constitution of Canada
- Long title: An Act to give effect to a request by the Senate and House of Commons of Canada Loi donnant suite à une demande du Sénat et de la Chambre des communes du Canada
- Citation: 1982, c. 11 (U.K.) (original citation); RSC 1985, App. II, No. 44 (alternative citation)
- Territorial extent: Canada; United Kingdom
- Considered by: Senate of Canada; House of Commons of Canada
- Enacted by: Parliament of the United Kingdom
- Enacted: March 29, 1982
- Assented to by: Elizabeth II
- Royal assent: March 29, 1982
- Commenced: March 29, 1982 (Note: Schedule B of the act, setting out the Constitution Act, 1982, came into force in Canada only by proclamation on April 17, 1982.)

Text of statute as originally enacted
- Status: Current legislation

The Canada Act 1982 (c. 11) (French: Loi de 1982 sur le Canada) is an act of the Parliament of the United Kingdom and one of the enactments which make up the Constitution of Canada. It was enacted at the request of the Senate and House of Commons of Canada to patriate Canada's constitution, ending the power of the British Parliament to amend the constitution. The act also formally ended the "request and consent" provisions of the Statute of Westminster 1931 in relation to Canada, whereby the British parliament had a general power to pass laws extending to Canada at its own request.

Annexed as Schedule B to the act is the text of the Constitution Act, 1982, in both of Canada's official languages (i.e. English and French). Because of the requirements of official bilingualism, the body of the Canada Act itself is also set out in French in Schedule A to the act, which is declared by s. 3 to have "the same authority in Canada as the English version thereof".

== History ==
Canada's modern political history as a union of previously separate provinces began with the British North America Act 1867 (officially called the Constitution Act, 1867, in Canada). This act combined the Province of Canada (now Ontario and Quebec) with Nova Scotia and New Brunswick into a Dominion within the British Empire. Canada adopted a Westminster-style government with a Parliament of Canada. A governor general fulfilled the constitutional duties of the British sovereign on Canadian soil. Similar arrangements applied within each province.

Despite this autonomy, the United Kingdom still had the power to legislate for Canada, and Canada was thus still legally a self-governing British dominion. The Statute of Westminster 1931 restricted the British Parliament's power to legislate for Canada, unless the Dominion requested and consented to Imperial legislation. This had the effect of increasing Canada's sovereignty. The British North America (No. 2) Act 1949, was also passed by the British Parliament, giving the Parliament of Canada significant constitutional amending powers.

However, with Canada's agreement at the time, under s. 7(1) of the Statute of Westminster, the British Parliament also retained the power to amend the key Canadian constitutional statutes, namely the British North America Acts. In effect, an act of the British Parliament was required to make certain changes to the Canadian constitution. Delay in the patriation of the Canadian constitution was due in large part to the lack of agreement concerning a method for amending the constitution that would be acceptable to all of the provinces, particularly Quebec.

== Enactment ==
The Canada Act 1982 was passed by the Parliament of the United Kingdom in response to the request from the Canadian Senate and House of Commons to end Britain's authority and transfer the authority for amending the Constitution of Canada to the federal and provincial governments. After unpromising negotiations with the provincial governments, Prime Minister Pierre Trudeau announced that the federal government would unilaterally patriate the Constitution from Britain. Manitoba, Newfoundland and Quebec responded by posing references to the provincial courts of appeal, challenging the federal government's power to seek unilateral amendments from Britain. In September 1981, the Supreme Court of Canada ruled in the Patriation Reference that provincial consent was not legally necessary, but to do so without substantial consent would be contrary to a longstanding constitutional convention. Trudeau succeeded in convincing nine provinces out of ten to consent to patriation by agreeing to the addition of a Notwithstanding Clause to limit the application of the Canadian Charter of Rights and Freedoms as a result of discussions during a First Ministers' conference and other minor changes in November 1981.

There was little opposition from the British government to passing the act, with 44 members of Parliament (MPs) voting against the act, less than 10 percent of the House of Commons. Citing concerns over Canada's past mistreatment of Quebec and Indigenous peoples (as recalled with frustration by Jean Chrétien in his memoirs Straight from the Heart), 24 Conservative and 16 Labour MPs voted against the act. However, new research into documents of the Margaret Thatcher government indicate that Britain had serious concerns about the inclusion of the Canadian Charter of Rights and Freedoms within the Canada Act. Part of this concern stemmed from letters of protest the British received about it from provincial actors, but also because the Charter undermined the principle of parliamentary supremacy, which until that time had always been a core feature of every government practising the Westminster system.

Through section 2 of the Canada Act 1982, the United Kingdom ended its involvement with further amendments to the Canadian constitution. Amendments to the Constitution now must be made under the various amending formulas set out in Part V of the Constitution Act, 1982.

== Proclamation ==
The Canada Act 1982 received royal assent on March 29 in London, but it did not take full effect immediately. Canada's Constitution Act, 1982, was proclaimed in force by Elizabeth II as Queen of Canada on April 17 on Parliament Hill in Ottawa. The proclamation marked the end of a long process and efforts by many successive governments to patriate the Constitution. The proclamation brought into force the new amending formula, ending any role for the British Parliament in Canadian law, and implemented the Canadian Charter of Rights and Freedoms.

The monarch's constitutional powers and roles over Canada were not affected by the act. Canada has complete sovereignty as an independent country, and the King's role as monarch of Canada is separate from his role as the British monarch or the monarch of any of the other Commonwealth realms.

== See also ==
- Patriation
- Canadian sovereignty

Comparable acts concerning ex-Dominion sovereignty

- Australia Act 1986
- Constitution of India
- Constitution of Ireland
- New Zealand Constitution Act 1986
- Pakistan Constitution of 1956
- Sri Lankan Constitution of 1972
- Status of the Union Act, 1934 and South African Constitution of 1961
