= Statute of Westminster Adoption Act 1947 =

Constitutional act of New Zealand

New Zealand Parliament
- Long title: An Act to Adopt certain Sections of the Statute of Westminster, 1931
- Passed: 21 November 1947
- Royal assent: 25 November 1947

Related legislation
- Statute of Westminster 1931 (UK); New Zealand Constitution Amendment Act 1947 (UK); New Zealand Constitution Amendment (Request and Consent) Act 1947
- Status: Repealed

The Statute of Westminster Adoption Act 1947 was a constitutional act of the New Zealand Parliament that formally accepted the full external autonomy offered by the British Parliament. By passing the Act, New Zealand adopted the Statute of Westminster 1931, an act of the British Parliament that granted full sovereign status and Commonwealth membership to the Dominions ratifying the statute. New Zealand was the last Dominion to ratify it (the Dominion of Newfoundland did not ratify it before becoming part of Canada in 1949).

At the time of its adoption in New Zealand, the Statute of Westminster was seen as a necessary constitutional step to clarify the sovereignty of the New Zealand Parliament, and not a change in New Zealand's relationship with its former coloniser, to which New Zealand politicians stressed continued loyalty. It has come to be regarded as an important step in the independence of New Zealand. Arguably the New Zealand Parliament was not a sovereign parliament until the act passed, as it was not able to make or unmake all law.

The Act was replaced and repealed by the Constitution Act 1986, which, among other provisions, removed all ability of the British Parliament to pass laws for New Zealand.

== Effect ==
The Act's main purpose was to adopt sections two, three, four, five and six of the Statute of Westminster 1931. Section two of the Statute repealed the Colonial Laws Validity Act 1865, section three allowed the Parliament to legislate extraterritoriality, section four disallowed the British Parliament to legislate for the Dominion, except by its own consent. Sections five and six relate to jurisdiction over merchant shipping and Courts of Admiralty.

Section two of the Act ensured that, under section four of the Statute, the request and consent of the New Zealand Parliament was required for any legislation. It also stated existing statutes of the United Kingdom that applied to New Zealand "shall be deemed so to apply and extend as if they have always so applied and extended according to its tenor". This section allowed the New Zealand Parliament the ability to amend all of the New Zealand Constitution Act 1852, a power it took up by the passing of the New Zealand Constitution Amendment (Request and Consent) Act 1947. The United Kingdom Parliament then passed the New Zealand Constitution Amendment Act 1947 (UK).

The Act enabled the New Zealand parliament to create New Zealand citizenship, which it did with the passing of the British Nationality and New Zealand Citizenship Act 1948.

== Background ==
The Statute of Westminster was the product of the Balfour Declaration of 1926, issued by the 1926 Imperial Conference. The declaration followed the formal end of the First World War with the signing of the Treaty of Versailles (which New Zealand signed) in 1919 and Irish independence in 1922. When the draft Statute of Westminster was released, New Zealand Prime Minister Gordon Coates, who attended the 1926 conference, described the declaration as a "poisonous document", while his predecessor (the first New Zealand-born prime minister, who also attended the conference) Sir Francis Bell complained of "damned Statute of Westminster propaganda."

New Zealand initiated an addition to the Statute that it would not apply to a particular Dominion unless adopted into that Dominions' domestic law. With the support of Australia and Newfoundland (who were also lukewarm on the Statute), Sections 8 and 10 of the Statute set out this requirement.

New Zealand did not adopt the Statute of Westminster 1931 until 1947 on account of loyalty to the British Empire. At the opening of the 1930 Imperial Conference that drafted the Statute of Westminster, Prime Minister George Forbes stated:

New Zealand has not, in any great measure, been concerned with the recent development in the constitutional relations between the members of the British Commonwealth of Nations. We have felt that at all times within recent years we have had ample scope for our national aspirations and ample freedom to carry out in their entirety such measures as have seemed to us desirable.

Even with the election of the First Labour Government, which took a more independent line on foreign policy (for example, opposing moves to appease Nazi Germany), adoption of the Statute was not seen as important. The First Labour Government stressed the continued importance of the relationship with the United Kingdom for New Zealand, with Prime Minister Michael Joseph Savage declaring at the outbreak of the Second World War "Where [Britain] stands, we stand."

Australia adopted the Statute following the Fall of Singapore in 1942, in order to gain greater control of its military. Following its re-election at the 1943 general election, the Labour Government, by then led by Peter Fraser, had proposed to adopt the statute in its Speech from the Throne in 1944 (two years after Australia adopted the Act). During the Address-In-Reply debate, the National opposition passionately opposed the proposed adoption, claiming the Government was being disloyal to the United Kingdom. National MP for Tauranga, Frederick Doidge, argued "With us, loyalty is an instinct as deep as religion". The proposal was buried for the 1943–1946 term of parliament, but re-emerged following the 1946 general election, which was again won by Labour.

The National opposition prompted the adoption of the Statute in 1947 when its leader and future Prime Minister Sidney Holland introduced a private members' bill to abolish the New Zealand Legislative Council. Because New Zealand required the consent of the British Parliament to amend the sections of the New Zealand Constitution Act 1852 establishing the Legislative Council, Fraser decided to adopt the Statute. This claim was challenged at the time by the opposition, who argued the government was attempting to stall the debate on abolishing the upper house.

== Debate and passage ==
The Bill to adopt the Statute was introduced in July 1947. Its first reading was on 19 September 1947.

The Bill's second reading started on 7 November 1947. Prime Minister Peter Fraser began the debate by assuring the House of Representatives that the Bill would not do anything to lessen the ties between New Zealand and other members of the Commonwealth and would instead "strengthen the ties between the various parts of the Commonwealth and ourselves in New Zealand and the Mother-country." He added that Viscount Cranborne, former Secretary of State for Dominion Affairs, had been consulted on the adoption and did not think to pass the Bill would amount to severance from the British Empire.

Martyn Finlay stated that the Statute would have no effect on the Treaty of Waitangi, but MP for Hauraki, Andy Sutherland questioned this contention.

National MPs had mixed views on the Bill. National MP for Remuera Ronald Algie raised concerns for the continued access to the Judicial Committee of the Privy Council. These concerns were rejected and appeals to the Privy Council remained in place until 2003, with the creation of the Supreme Court of New Zealand. Algie also complained the adoption of the Act was due to changes to the status of British subjects, and argued that recognising parts of the British Commonwealth as independent states could see constituent republics of the USSR recognised as such, thus increasing their voice in international affairs.

National MP Clifton Webb stated that since Britain had no objection he had decided to support the Bill, stating "I have no emotional enthusiasm for it." Frederick Doige restated his previous position by stating "...loyalty to the Motherland [Britain] is an instinct as deep as religion." He nevertheless supported the Bill at its final reading, since it gave New Zealand's parliament the ability to abolish the Legislative Council, which was National Party policy.

Other concerns raised included the status of the New Zealand Constitution Act 1852, and whether the issue was relevant.

The Bill had its third and final reading on 21 November 1947. It received royal assent on 25 November 1947.

== Repeal ==
Following a difficult transfer of power after the 1984 election, the incoming fourth Labour Government created the Officials Committee on Constitutional Reform, which reported that "the time [was] overdue to free our constitutional law from the shadow of our former colonial status", including repeal of the Statute of Westminster Adoption Act 1947. The Constitution Act 1986 replaced the Statute of Westminster Adoption Act, which was repealed by section 28 of the act.

== See also ==
- Changes in British sovereignty
- Constitution of New Zealand
- Status of the Union Act, 1934
- Statute of Westminster Adoption Act 1942 – Australian equivalent of the Act
