= Constitution Act 1986 =

Act of the New Zealand Parliament

New Zealand Parliament
- Long title: An Act to reform the constitutional law of New Zealand, to bring together into one enactment certain provisions of constitutional significance, and to provide that the New Zealand Constitution Act 1852 of the Parliament of the United Kingdom shall cease to have effect as part of the law of New Zealand
- Passed: 13 December 1986
- Commenced: 1 January 1987

Amended by
- 1987, 1999, 2005

Related legislation
- New Zealand Bill of Rights Act 1990, the Electoral Act 1993
- Status: Current legislation

The Constitution Act 1986 is an act of the New Zealand Parliament that forms a major part of the constitution of New Zealand. It lays down the framework defining fundamental political principles of governance, and establishes the powers of the executive, legislative and judicial branches of state. It outlines the roles and duties of the monarch, the governor-general, ministers and judges. The Act repealed and replaced the New Zealand Constitution Act 1852 and the Statute of Westminster, and removed the ability of the British Parliament to pass laws for New Zealand with the consent of the New Zealand Parliament.

== Background ==
=== 1984 constitutional crisis ===
After the 1984 election there was an awkward transfer of power from the outgoing Third National government to the new Fourth Labour government in the midst of a financial crisis. Outgoing Prime Minister Sir Robert Muldoon was unwilling initially to accept instructions from incoming Prime Minister David Lange to devalue the currency. Ministers hurriedly constructed an argument to convince Muldoon to comply, drawing on the ethos of past transitions, as there was no convention. Eventually he relented, but only after his own party caucus had threatened to replace him. A press statement was made on 17 June outlining the behaviour of outgoing governments, which was dubbed the "caretaker convention".

An Officials Committee on Constitutional Reform was established by the Labour Government to review New Zealand's constitutional law, and the Constitution Act resulted from two reports by this committee. The issue of the transfer of power from outgoing to incoming governments (and hence prime ministers) was not resolved by this Act, however, and the transfer of executive powers remains a matter of unwritten constitutional conventions.

=== Committee's report ===
The Officials Committee on Constitutional Reform reported back to Parliament during February 1986. The Committee recommended that New Zealand adopt an Act to restate various constitutional provisions in a single enactment that would replace the New Zealand Constitution Act 1852, thus "patriating" the Constitution Act to New Zealand.

The recommendation followed events in Canada, which had recently patriated its own constitution, and Australia, which had recently removed any residual power of the British parliament to legislate in Australia. The Canadian Parliament began the process by passing the Constitution Act, 1982, and the British Parliament had renounced its right to pass legislation on behalf of Canada in the Canada Act 1982. The Australian Parliament passed the Australia Act 1986 in 1985, and the British Parliament would pass its own Act in February 1986. This left New Zealand as the only original Dominion from 1931 that still had residual constitutional links to the United Kingdom.

=== Parliamentary process ===
A bill was introduced into Parliament during mid-1986, and was passed unanimously with the support of both the Labour and National parties on 13 December 1986. The act came into force on 1 January 1987. Amendments were passed during 1987 and 1999.

== Effect ==
The Act repealed the New Zealand Constitution Act 1852, renamed the General Assembly as the "Parliament of New Zealand" and ended the right of the Parliament of the United Kingdom to make laws for New Zealand.

== Key provisions ==
The Act consists of four main parts:

=== Part I: The Sovereign ===
- The head of state of New Zealand is the "Sovereign in Right of New Zealand", titled as the king or queen of New Zealand (section 2), and the sovereign's representative in New Zealand is the governor-general (section 3).
- In case of regency, a regent performing royal functions under the law of the United Kingdom also performs them in right of New Zealand, without prejudice to the governor-general's authority (section 4).
- The succession of the sovereign is determined by the Act of Settlement 1701 (which is part of New Zealand law under the Imperial Laws Application Act 1988), as well as any other laws affecting the succession (such as the Royal Succession Act 2013) (section 5).

=== Part II: The Executive ===
- Ministers of the Crown and members of the Executive Council of New Zealand must be members of Parliament (section 6), with two exceptions:
  - A non-MP who was a candidate in the previous general election may be appointed and serve for at most 40 days, though they continue in the post if they become an MP during that time.
  - A person who ceases to be an MP continues in that post for up to 28 days.
- Any member of the Executive Council may perform the functions of any Minister (section 7).
- Parliamentary Under-Secretaries, who must be MPs (subject to a 28-day grace period after ceasing to be so), are appointed by the governor-general and may perform whatever ministerial functions are appointed to them, without prejudice to the powers of their departmental minister (sections 8, 9).

=== Part III: The Legislature ===
==== The House of Representatives ====
- The House of Representatives is stated to be the same entity established by the New Zealand Constitution Act 1852 (section 10).
- The Oath of Allegiance is to be taken by members of Parliament (section 11).
- The rules relating to the election of the Speaker and the Speaker's role upon dissolution or expiration of Parliament are set out (section 12, section 13).

==== Parliament ====
- Parliament consists of the Sovereign in right of New Zealand (currently the King) and the House of Representatives; Parliament is stated to be the same body as the General Assembly established by the New Zealand Constitution Act 1852 (section 14).
- Parliament has full power to make laws. Any remaining power of the UK Parliament to make laws for New Zealand is abolished (section 15).
- Bills passed by Parliament become law as of royal assent (section 16).
- The term of Parliament is to be three years unless it is dissolved sooner (section 17).
- The governor-general's power to summon, prorogue and dissolve Parliament is set out (section 18).
- Parliament meets not later than six weeks after the day fixed for the return of the writs for the general election (section 19).
- Parliamentary business lapses on expiration or dissolution of Parliament but not prorogation, though Parliament may pass a resolution to reinstate business from the previous session (section 20).

==== Parliament and public finance ====
- Bills providing for the appropriation of public money or for the imposition of any charge upon public money are not to be passed unless they have been recommended to the House of Representatives by the Crown (section 21). This section has been repealed.
- It is not lawful for the Crown, except by or under an Act of Parliament, to levy a tax, to raise a loan from any person or to spend any public money (section 22).

=== Part IV: The Judiciary ===
- The rules relating to the protection of judges against arbitrary removal from office are set out (section 23).
- The salary of a judge of the High Court is not to be reduced during the judge's term.
- Section 21, covering bills appropriating public money, is repealed.

== Entrenchment ==
Only section 17 of the Act, which says that the term of Parliament is "three years from the day fixed for the return of the writs issued for the last preceding general election of members of the House of Representatives, and no longer", is entrenched, by section 268 of the Electoral Act 1993. This provision requires that any amendment to section 17 can be made only by a majority of three-quarters of all votes cast in Parliament, or by a referendum. Section 268 of the Electoral Act 1993 itself is not entrenched, which means that Parliament could repeal the section and then amend section 17 of the Act. Thus, the provision is said to only be "singly entrenched". Some academics, including Sir Geoffrey Palmer, argue that the whole of the Constitution Act should be entrenched.

== United Kingdom ==
The Act replaced the New Zealand Constitution Act 1852, repealed the Statute of Westminster Adoption Act 1947 and removed the ability of the United Kingdom to pass laws for New Zealand with the consent of New Zealand's Parliament.

Unlike Canada, New Zealand was able to patriate its constitution without British approval. The British Parliament had already passed the New Zealand Constitution Amendment Act 1947, as requested by the New Zealand Parliament in the New Zealand Constitution Amendment (Request and Consent) Act 1947. The British Act allowed the Parliament of New Zealand to amend any part of the 1852 Act, including the abolition of the Legislative Council in 1951. Prior to that, a number of sections of the 1852 Act were unable to be amended by the Parliament of New Zealand, such as provisions establishing the Parliament itself.

== See also ==
- Independence of New Zealand
- Referendums in New Zealand

Comparable acts asserting ex-Dominion sovereignty

- Australia Act 1986
- Canada Act 1982
- Constitution of India
- Constitution of Ireland
- 1956 Constitution of Pakistan
- Sri Lankan Constitution of 1972
- Status of the Union Act, 1934 and South African Constitution of 1961
