= Monarchy of New Zealand =

King of New Zealand
- Te Kīngi o Aotearoa (Māori)
- Coats of arms of New Zealand, the Cook Islands and Niue

Incumbent
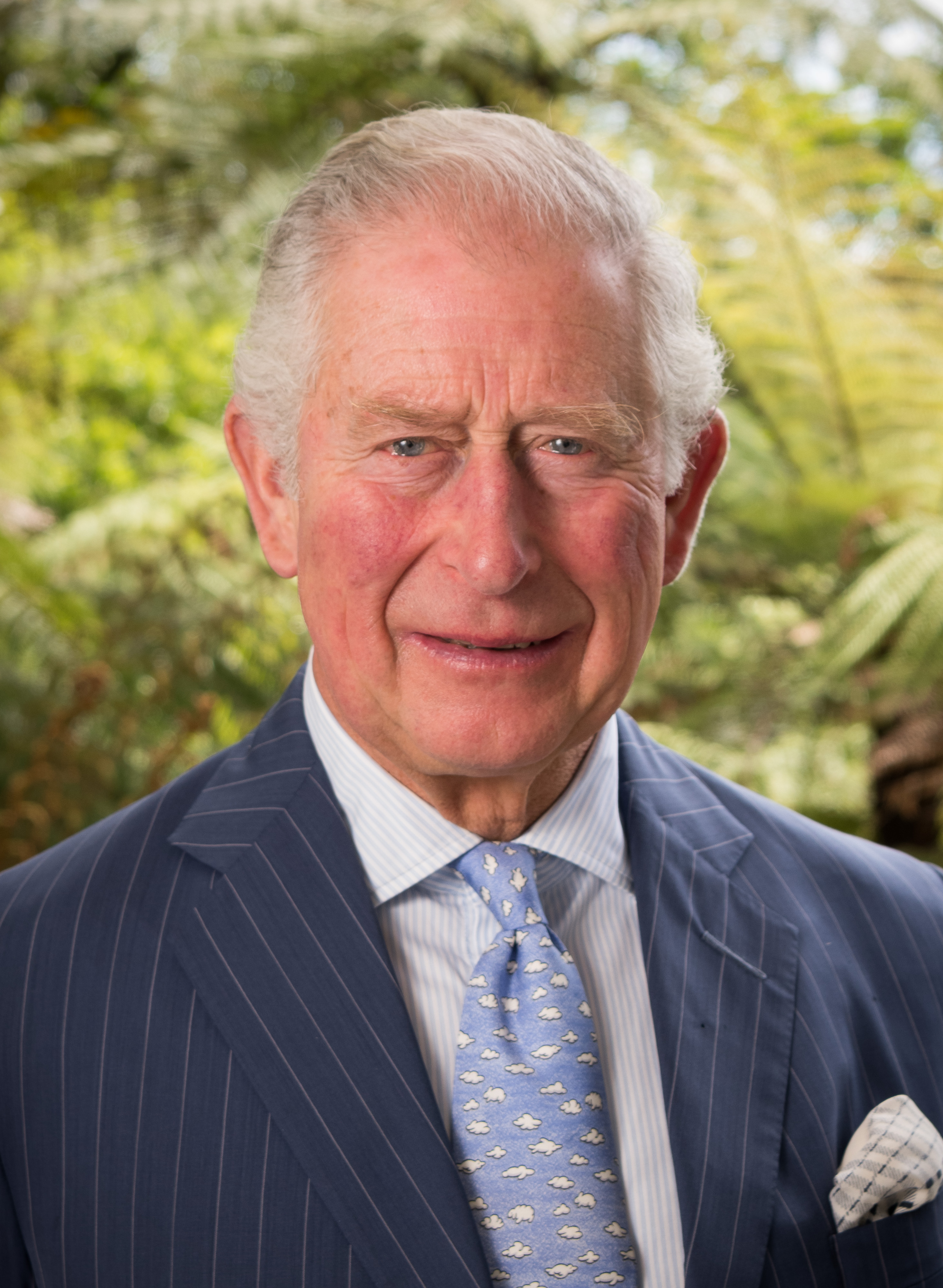
- Charles III; Tiāre te Tuatoru (Māori) since 8 September 2022

Details
- Style: His Majesty (Māori: Te Arikinui)
- Heir apparent: William, Prince of Wales

The monarchy of New Zealand (Note: The monarchy is also referred to as the Crown, the Crown in Right of New Zealand, His Majesty the King in Right of New Zealand or the Sovereign in Right of New Zealand, especially in regard to the entire government of New Zealand.) is the constitutional system of government in which a hereditary monarch is the sovereign and head of state of New Zealand. The current monarch, King Charles III, acceded to the throne following the death of his mother, Queen Elizabeth II, on 8 September 2022 in the United Kingdom. The King's elder son, William, Prince of Wales, is the heir apparent.

The Treaty of Waitangi between Queen Victoria and Māori chiefs (rangatira) was signed on 6 February 1840. This laid the foundation for the proclamation of British sovereignty over New Zealand on 21 May 1840; the British monarch became New Zealand's head of state. The country gradually became independent from Britain and the monarchy evolved to become a distinctly New Zealand institution, represented by unique symbols. The individual who is the New Zealand monarch is currently shared with 14 other countries (realms) within the Commonwealth of Nations, in each of which the monarchy is legally separate. As a result, the current monarch is officially titled King of New Zealand (Māori: Kīngi o Aotearoa) and, in this capacity, he and other members of the royal family undertake various public and private functions across the Realm of New Zealand. The King is the only member of the royal family with any constitutional role.

All executive authority is vested in the King, and his assent is required for parliament to enact laws and for letters patent and orders in council to have legal effect. However, the King's authority is subject to the conventional stipulations of constitutional monarchy, and his direct participation in these areas of governance is limited. Most of the related powers are instead exercised by the elected members of parliament, the ministers of the Crown generally drawn from amongst them, and the judges and justices of the peace. Other powers vested in the King, such as dismissal of a prime minister, are significant but are treated only as reserve powers and as an important security part of the role of the monarchy.

Since the monarch resides in the United Kingdom (the oldest Commonwealth realm), most of the royal constitutional and ceremonial duties within the Realm of New Zealand are typically carried out by his or her representative, the governor-general of New Zealand.

The role of the monarchy is a recurring topic of public discussion. Some New Zealanders think New Zealand should become a republic with a New Zealand resident as the head of state, while others wish to retain the monarchy.

== International and domestic aspects ==
Commonwealth realms Dependencies and associated states of Commonwealth realms Charles III is the reigning sovereign of each of the 15 Commonwealth realms.

The Realm of New Zealand is one of the Commonwealth realms, 15 independent members of the Commonwealth of Nations that share the same person as sovereign and head of state, and have in common the same royal line of succession. The monarch, currently King Charles III, resides in the oldest and most populous realm, the United Kingdom; however, he and his family have toured New Zealand on occasion.

This arrangement emerged during the course of the 20th century. Since the passage of the Statute of Westminster in 1931, (Note: The Statute of Westminster was initiated by the British parliament. Although it was not adopted in New Zealand until 1947, the statute's validity in the United Kingdom meant that British ministers of the Crown would no longer intervene in New Zealand affairs without the consent of New Zealand politicians. See § History) the pan-national Crown has had both a shared and separate character, and the sovereign's role as monarch of New Zealand has been distinct to his or her position as monarch of the United Kingdom. The monarchy thus ceased to be an exclusively British institution and has become a separate establishment within New Zealand. Nonetheless, for historical reasons, the monarchy and monarch are termed "British" in both legal and common language; this conflicts with not only the New Zealand government's recognition of a distinctly New Zealand Crown, but also the sovereign's distinct New Zealand title.

On all matters pertaining to the New Zealand state, the monarch is advised solely by New Zealand ministers of the Crown, with no input from British or other realms' ministers. One of the state duties carried out on the formal advice of the New Zealand prime minister is the appointment of the governor-general. As the monarch lives outside of New Zealand, the governor-general personally represents the monarch and performs most of his or her domestic duties in their absence, in accordance with Letters Patent 1983. All royal powers in New Zealand may be carried out by both the monarch and governor-general and, in New Zealand law, the two offices are fully interchangeable, mention of one always simultaneously including the other. As of 2021, the current Governor-General is Dame Cindy Kiro.

=== Title ===
Before 1953, the sovereign's title was the same throughout all realms and territories. It was agreed at the Commonwealth Economic Conference in London in December 1952 that each of the Commonwealth realms, including New Zealand, could adopt its own royal titles for the monarch. The New Zealand Parliament enacted the Royal Titles Act in 1953, altering the style borne by Queen Elizabeth II and giving her the title of Elizabeth the Second, by the Grace of God of the United Kingdom, New Zealand and Her Other Realms and Territories Queen, Head of the Commonwealth, Defender of the Faith. Subsequent to the passage of the Royal Titles Act 1974, the monarch's title in New Zealand is currently Charles the Third, By the Grace of God King of New Zealand and of His Other Realms and Territories, Head of the Commonwealth, Defender of the Faith.

Although the King's New Zealand title includes the phrase 'Defender of the Faith', neither the sovereign nor the governor-general has any religious role in New Zealand; there has never been an established church in the country. This is one of the key differences from the King's role in England, where he is supreme governor of the Church of England. (Note: When in New Zealand, the monarch has attended Anglican church services, but has no official role in the Anglican Church in New Zealand.)

=== Succession and regency ===
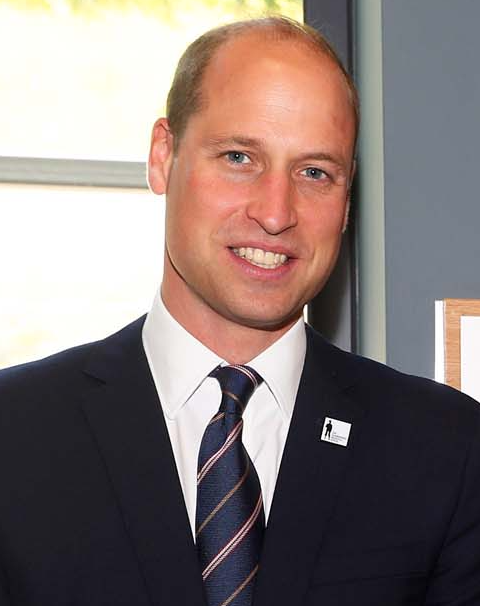
William, Prince of Wales, is the heir apparent

As the King's elder son, William, Prince of Wales, is the first in line to the throne. Succession is, for persons born before 28 October 2011, governed by male-preference cognatic primogeniture and, for those born after 28 October 2011, by absolute primogeniture—wherein succession passes to an individual's children according to birth order, regardless of sex.

Laws governing the line of succession, including the Act of Settlement 1701 and Bill of Rights 1689, restrict the throne to the biological, legitimate descendants of Sophia of Hanover, and stipulate that the monarch cannot be a Roman Catholic and must be in communion with (i.e. a member of) the Church of England upon accession. Through the adoption of the Statute of Westminster (later repealed in New Zealand) and the Imperial Laws Application Act 1988, these constitutional laws as they apply to New Zealand now lie within the full control of the New Zealand Parliament. Nonetheless, New Zealand agreed not to change its rules of succession without the unanimous consent of the other realms, unless explicitly leaving the shared monarchy relationship—a reciprocal arrangement applied uniformly in all the other realms, including the United Kingdom, and often likened to a treaty amongst these nations. In that spirit, the Commonwealth realms reached the Perth Agreement in 2011, committed to repeal the Royal Marriages Act 1772, which gave precedence to male heirs and excluded from succession a person married to a Roman Catholic. In New Zealand this was accomplished through the Royal Succession Act 2013.

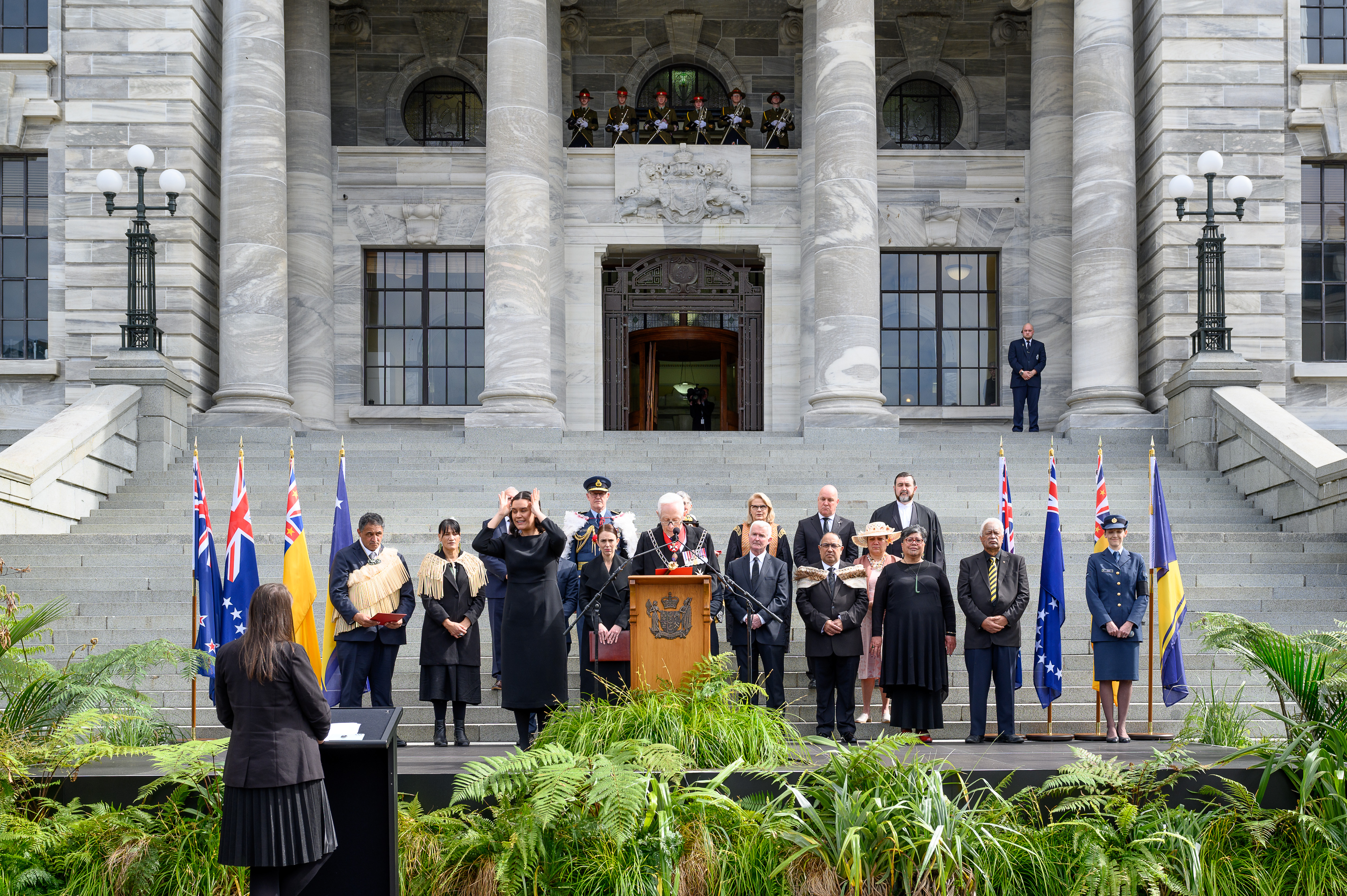
New Zealand Herald Extraordinary, Phillip O'Shea, reading the proclamation of accession of Charles III on the steps of the New Zealand Parliament Buildings, 2022

Upon a demise of the Crown (the death or abdication of a monarch), the late sovereign's heir immediately and automatically succeeds, without any obligatory need for affirmation or further ceremony—hence arises the phrase "The King is dead. Long live the King!" It is customary, though, for the accession of the new monarch to be publicly proclaimed at a ceremony attended by the governor-general and senior state officials. Following an appropriate period of national mourning, the monarch is also crowned in the United Kingdom in an ancient ritual, but one not necessary for a sovereign to reign. (Note: For example, King Edward VIII was never crowned, yet was undoubtedly king during his short time on the throne.) Other than a transfer of all royal powers and functions to the new monarch from his or her predecessor, no other law or office is affected, as all references in legislation to previous monarchs, whether in the masculine (e.g. "His Majesty") or feminine (e.g. "the Queen"), continue to mean the reigning sovereign of New Zealand. After an individual ascends the throne, he or she typically continues to reign until death, being unable to unilaterally abdicate. (Note: The only New Zealand monarch to abdicate, King Edward VIII, did so with the authorisation of the New Zealand government granted in His Majesty's Declaration of Abdication Act 1936 (UK).)

Regency Acts allow for regencies in the event of a monarch who is a minor or who is physically or mentally incapacitated. When a regency is necessary, the next qualified individual in the line of succession automatically becomes regent, unless they themselves are a minor or incapacitated. The Regency Act 1937 is a British law, not a New Zealand law, and as such has no direct applicability to New Zealand. However, the New Zealand Constitution Act 1986 specifies that should a regent be installed in the United Kingdom, that individual will carry out the functions of the sovereign of New Zealand.

=== Finances ===
The sovereign draws from New Zealand funds for support in the performance of their duties when in New Zealand or acting as monarch of New Zealand abroad. New Zealanders do not pay any money to the King or any other member of the royal family, either towards personal income or to support royal residences outside of New Zealand. Normally, tax dollars pay only for the costs associated with the governor-general as instruments of the King's authority, including travel, security, residences, offices, ceremonies, and the like. Supporters of the monarchy argue it costs New Zealand taxpayers only a small outlay for royal engagements and tours and the expenses of the governor-general's establishment. Monarchy New Zealand states "[t]his figure is about one dollar per person per year", about $4.3 million per annum. An analysis by New Zealand Republic (a republican advocacy group) of the 2010 budget claimed the office of governor-general costs New Zealand taxpayers about $7.6 million in ongoing costs and $11 million for Government House upgrades, figures Monarchy New Zealand claimed had been "arbitrarily inflated" by New Zealand Republic.

=== Cook Islands, Niue and territories ===
The sovereign of New Zealand also serves as monarch to Cook Islands and Niue, territories in free association with New Zealand within the larger Realm of New Zealand. The New Zealand monarchy is unitary throughout all jurisdictions in the realm, with the headship of state being a part of all equally. As such, the sovereignty of Cook Islands and Niue is passed on not by the governor-general or parliament of New Zealand but through the overreaching Crown itself as part of executive, legislative and judicial operations in all three areas.

The self-government provisions for the Cook Islands within the Realm of New Zealand allow the King to be directly represented as head of state in Cook Islands affairs by the King's representative, while the governor-general of New Zealand represents the monarch in matters pertaining to the entire realm. The governor-general (themselves represented by state services commissioner) represents the monarch in Niue, carrying out all the monarch's constitutional and ceremonial duties of state on their behalf. The administrator of the territory of Tokelau is a government official appointed by New Zealand's minister of foreign affairs to represent the New Zealand Government—not the monarch personally.

== Personification of the state ==
As the living embodiment of the Crown, the sovereign is regarded as the personification, or legal personality, of the New Zealand state, with the state therefore referred to as His Majesty The King in Right of New Zealand, (Note: For example, if a lawsuit is filed against the government, the respondent is formally described as His Majesty The King in Right of New Zealand, or simply Rex.) or The Crown (Māori: Te Karauna). As such, the monarch is the employer of all government staff (including judges, members of the Defence Force, police officers, and parliamentarians), as well as the owner of all state land and buildings (Crown property including Crown land), state-owned companies and agencies (Crown entities), and the copyright for all government publications (Crown copyright).

I, [specify], swear that I will be faithful and bear true allegiance to Her [or His] Majesty [specify the name of the reigning Sovereign], Her [or His] heirs and successors, according to law. So help me God.

— Oath of Allegiance to the Sovereign

As the embodiment of the state, the monarch is the locus of Oaths of Allegiance, required of many employees of the Crown, as well as by new citizens, as per the Oath of Citizenship laid out in the Citizenship Act. This is done in reciprocation to the sovereign's Coronation oath; at the coronation of Charles III he made a "solemn promise" to "govern the Peoples of" his realms, including New Zealand, "according to their respective laws and customs."

== Constitutional role ==
New Zealand's constitution is made up of a variety of statutes and conventions that are either British or New Zealand in origin, and together give New Zealand a parliamentary system of government wherein the role of the King is both legal and practical. The Crown is regarded as a corporation sole, with the sovereign, in the position of head of state, as the centre of a construct in which the power of the whole is shared by multiple institutions of government acting under the sovereign's authority.

The vast powers that belong to the Crown are collectively known as the Royal Prerogative, the exercise of which does not require parliamentary approval, though it is not unlimited; for example, the monarch does not have the prerogative to impose and collect new taxes without the authorisation of an Act of Parliament. The consent of the Crown must be obtained before parliament may even debate a bill affecting the sovereign's prerogatives or interests, and no Act of Parliament binds the King or his rights unless the Act expressly provides that it does.

=== Executive ===
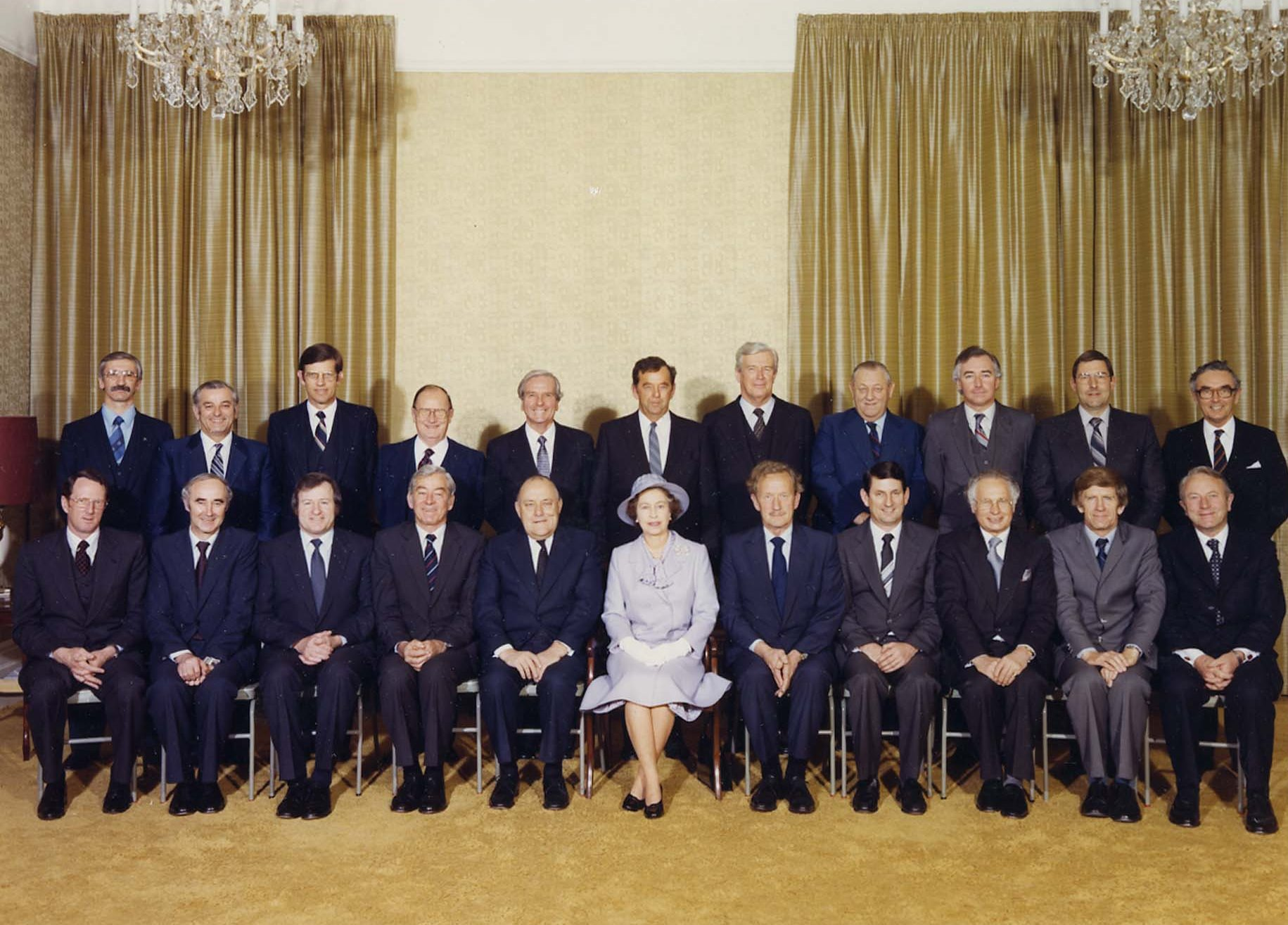
Queen Elizabeth II with the New Zealand Cabinet, 1981

The New Zealand Government (formally termed His Majesty's Government) is defined by the Constitution Act as the monarch acting on the advice of the Executive Council. One of the main duties of the Crown is to ensure that a democratic government is always in place. This involves appointing a prime minister to thereafter head the Cabinet, a committee of the Executive Council charged with advising the Crown on the exercise of the Royal Prerogative, and legally required to keep the governor-general up to date on state affairs.

In the construct of constitutional monarchy and responsible government, the ministerial advice tendered is typically binding, a situation described as "The [King] reigns, but the government rules, so long as it has the support of the House of Representatives." The Royal Prerogative belongs to the Crown and not to any of the ministers, and the monarch or governor-general may unilaterally use these powers in exceptional constitutional crisis situations, thereby allowing the monarch to make sure that the Government conducts itself in compliance with the constitution. There are also a few duties which must be specifically performed by, or bills that require assent by, the sovereign; these include applying the royal sign-manual and Seal of New Zealand to the appointment papers of governors-general, the confirmation of awards of New Zealand royal honours, and the approval of any change in his New Zealand title.

=== Foreign affairs ===
The Royal Prerogative also extends to foreign affairs: the governor-general conducts treaties, alliances and international agreements on the advice of the Cabinet. Prior to the Lomé Convention in 1975, the monarch, rather than the governor-general, would sign treaties on behalf of New Zealand. Following the signing of the convention, it was decided that the governor-general could sign such instruments. The governor-general, on behalf of the monarch, also accredits New Zealand high commissioners and ambassadors, and receives similar diplomats from foreign states. The letters of credence and recall were formerly issued by the monarch, but now are issued in the name of the incumbent governor-general (instead of following the usual international process of the letters being from one head of state to another). The issuance of passports falls under the Royal Prerogative, and all New Zealand passports are issued in the monarch's name and remain his property.

=== Parliament ===
External videos
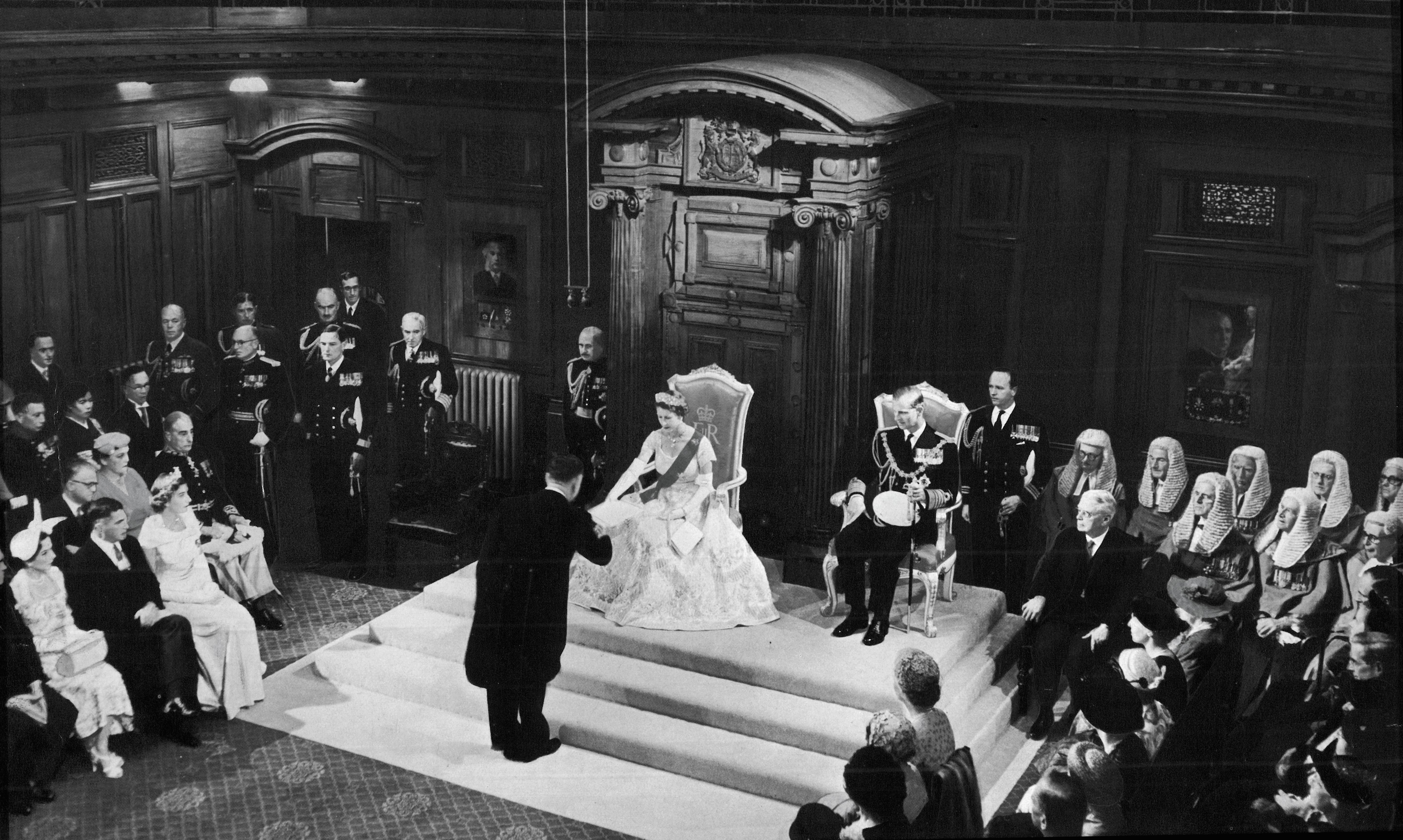
- Queen Elizabeth II opening a session of the New Zealand Parliament, 12 January 1954
- Queen Opens New Zealand Parliament (1954) Source: British Pathé.

The sovereign is one of the two components of the New Zealand Parliament. The monarch and governor-general do not participate in the legislative process save for the granting of the Royal Assent, which is necessary for a bill to be enacted as law; either figure or a delegate may perform this task; this is now a matter of convention. The Crown is further responsible for summoning and dissolving the parliament, after which the governor-general usually calls for a general election. The new parliamentary session is marked by either the monarch or the governor-general reading the Speech from the Throne; as they both are traditionally barred from the House of Representatives (the elected component of parliament), this ceremony takes place in the Legislative Council Chamber. Queen Elizabeth II personally opened parliament on seven occasions: January 1954, February 1963, March 1970, February 1974, February 1977, February 1986, and February 1990.

Despite the sovereign's exclusion, members of parliament must still express their loyalty to him and defer to his authority, as the Oath of Allegiance must be recited by all new parliamentarians before they may take their seat. Further, the official opposition is traditionally referred to as His Majesty's Loyal Opposition, illustrating that, while its members are opposed to the incumbent government, they remain loyal to the sovereign (as personification of the state and its authority).

=== Courts ===
The sovereign is responsible for rendering justice for all his subjects, and is thus traditionally deemed the fount of justice. He does not personally rule in judicial cases; instead the judicial functions of the Royal Prerogative are performed in trust and in the King's name by judges and justices of the peace. The monarch is immune from criminal prosecution, the notion in common law being that the sovereign "can do no wrong"; the monarch cannot be prosecuted in his own courts for criminal offences. The monarch, and by extension the governor-general, also grants immunity from prosecution, exercises the royal prerogative of mercy, and may pardon offences against the Crown, either before, during, or after a trial.

== Cultural role ==
=== Royal presence and duties ===
Members of the royal family have been present in New Zealand since the late 1800s, their reasons including participating in military manoeuvres or undertaking official royal tours. Usually important milestones, anniversaries, or celebrations of New Zealand culture will warrant the presence of the monarch, while other royals will be asked to participate in lesser occasions. Official duties involve the sovereign representing the New Zealand state at home or abroad, or their relations as members of the royal family participating in government organised ceremonies either in New Zealand or elsewhere. (Note: Though the royal family represents other countries abroad, as directed by their respective cabinets, and typically the governor-general will undertake state visits and other foreign duties on behalf of the monarch of New Zealand, members of the royal family will also take part in New Zealand events overseas. For example, on 11 November 2006, the Queen – accompanied by the Duke of Edinburgh, the Prince of Wales, the Duchess of Cornwall, Prince William, the Duke of York, and the Princess Royal – dedicated the New Zealand war memorial in London's Hyde Park, reviewing a royal Guard of honour formed by the largest contingent of New Zealand forces seen in the UK since her coronation in 1953.) An invitation from the Prime Minister of New Zealand is the impetus for royal participation in any New Zealand event, with informal consultation occurring beforehand. A committee of the British Cabinet Office, the Royal Visits Committee, then coordinates the visit schedule and details with the Visits and Ceremonies Office (VCO). Such events have included centennials and bicentennials; Waitangi Day; the openings of Commonwealth and other games; anniversaries of Māori treaty signings; awards ceremonies; anniversaries of the monarch's accession; and the like. Conversely, unofficial duties are performed by royal family members on behalf of New Zealand organisations of which they may be patrons, through their attendance at charity events, visiting with members of the New Zealand Defence Force as colonel-in-chief, or marking certain key anniversaries.

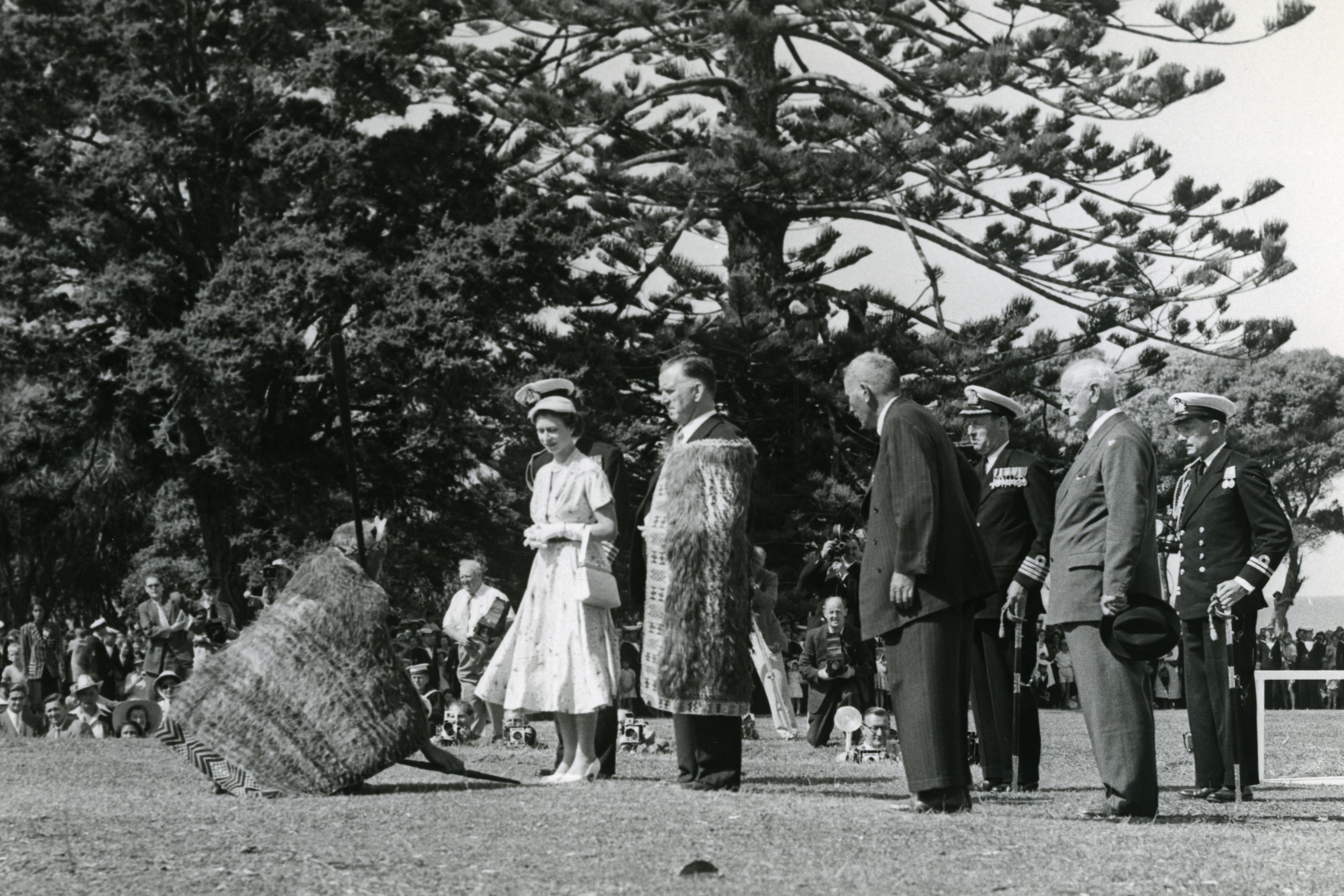
Queen Elizabeth II being greeted with a Māori ceremony (a pōwhiri) before addressing a crowd. Waitangi, December 1953

Since 1869, when Prince Alfred, one of Queen Victoria's sons, arrived on New Zealand's shores, dozens of tours of New Zealand by a member of the royal family have taken place, though only five of those occurred before 1953. After Alfred came the Duke and Duchess of Cornwall and York (later King George V and Queen Mary) in 1901; The Prince of Wales (later King Edward VIII), in 1920; the Duke and Duchess of York (later King George VI and Queen Elizabeth The Queen Mother) in 1927; and Prince Henry, Duke of Gloucester, from 1934 to 1935. Queen Elizabeth II was the first reigning monarch of New Zealand to tour the country, becoming such when she arrived during her 1953–1954 global tour; she broadcast from Government House in Auckland her annual Royal Christmas Message.

Queen Elizabeth II also toured New Zealand on a number of other occasions: between 6 and 18 February 1963, she attended celebrations at Waitangi and the Queen Elizabeth II Arts Council was founded as the nation's gift to the monarch; from 12 to 30 March 1970, the Queen, accompanied by Prince Charles and Princess Anne, participated in the James Cook bicentenary celebrations; between 30 January and 8 February 1974, and she attended and closed that year's Commonwealth Games in Christchurch and participated in New Zealand Day (now named Waitangi Day) events at Waitangi. As part of a Commonwealth-wide tour for her Silver Jubilee, Elizabeth was in New Zealand from 22 February to 7 March 1977; she made a brief visit, between 12 and 20 October 1981, following a Commonwealth Heads of Government Meeting (CHOGM) in Melbourne; marked the centennial of the New Zealand Police during a tour from 22 February to 2 March 1986; the Queen closed the Commonwealth Games in Auckland and, with her son, Prince Edward, took part in events marking the sesquicentennial of the Treaty of Waitangi between 1 and 16 February 1990; between 1 and 10 November 1995, she attended the CHOGM in Auckland and opened the newly refurbished parliament buildings; and, as part of her global tour for her Golden Jubilee, Elizabeth was in New Zealand from 22 to 27 February 2002. In November 2012, Charles, Prince of Wales, and his wife Camilla, Duchess of Cornwall, visited New Zealand to celebrate Queen Elizabeth II's diamond jubilee.

Some of the royal tours undertaken by more junior members of the royal family include the 1990 visit of Princess Anne to commemorate the 75th anniversary of the Gallipoli landings on Anzac Day, and when Prince William represented the Queen of New Zealand at VE and VJ Day commemorations in 2005, as part of an 11-day tour, and opened the new Supreme Court of New Zealand building in early 2010. Prince Edward spent two terms of the 1982 academic year as a house tutor and junior master at the Wanganui Collegiate School.

I want to show you that the Crown is not merely an abstract symbol of our unity but a personal and living bond between you and me.

— Queen Elizabeth II, Christmas Message, New Zealand, 1953

Apart from New Zealand, the King and his family regularly perform public duties in the other 14 Commonwealth realms of which he is head of state. This situation can mean members of the royal family will be promoting one nation and not another. On some occasions Queen Elizabeth II had represented the United Kingdom, while her governor-general represented New Zealand, with both in attendance at the same event.

=== The Crown and the Defence Force ===
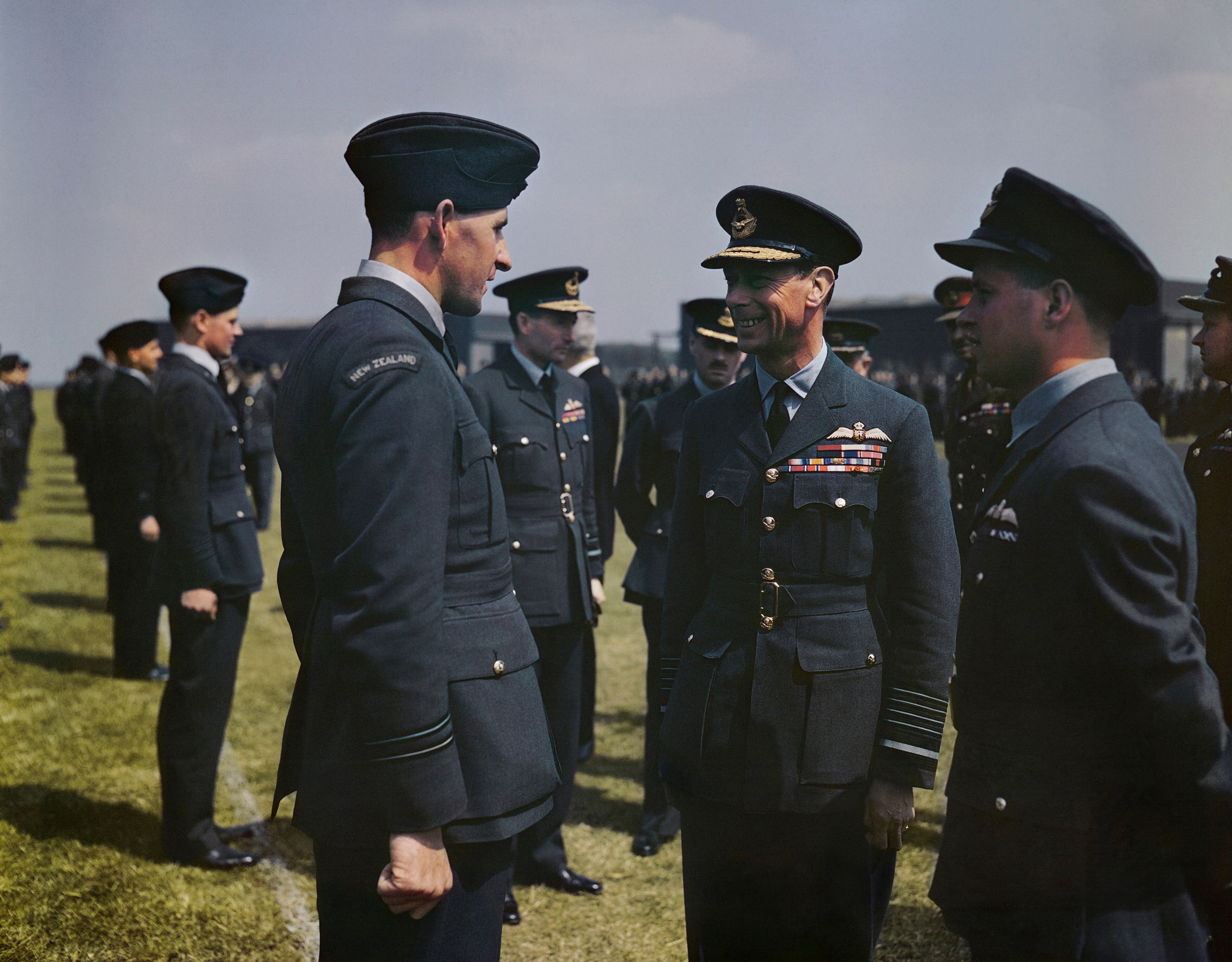
King George VI speaking with a RNZAF Flight Lieutenant Les Munro at RAF Scampton, 27 May 1943

The Crown sits at the pinnacle of the New Zealand Defence Force. The governor-general is commander-in-chief and under the Defence Act 1990 is authorised to "raise and maintain armed forces", consisting of the New Zealand Army, Royal New Zealand Navy, and Royal New Zealand Air Force. The sovereign's position as head of the armed forces is reflected in New Zealand's naval vessels bearing the prefix His Majesty's New Zealand Ship (Her Majesty's New Zealand Ship in the reign of a female monarch), and in the requirement that all members of the armed forces swear their allegiance to the sovereign and his or her heirs and successors. The governor-general commissions officers to command the forces.

Allegiance [by Defence Force personnel is to] the Sovereign, [however] loyalty [is] to the Government of the day... The Defence Force and the disposition of those Forces are at the decision... of Her Majesty's Ministers for the time being.

— State Services Commission, December 2001

Though the monarch and members of his family also act as colonels-in-chief of various regiments in the military, these posts are only ceremonial in nature, reflecting the Crown's relationship with the military through participation in military ceremonies both at home and abroad. (Note: Such events include inspections of the troops, and anniversaries of key battles; the governor-general represents the sovereign at military commemorations in New Zealand and sometimes at ceremonies abroad; for example, Sir Anand Satyanand in 2007 attended commemorations of the Battle of Passchendaele in Belgium, whenever the sovereign or a member of her family is in Auckland, they lay a wreath at the War Memorial, or at the National War Memorial in Wellington.) The country's only currently ranked Admiral of the Fleet, Field Marshal and Marshal of the Royal New Zealand Air Force is Charles III. The ranks were also formerly held by Prince Philip, the consort of Queen Elizabeth II. Various regiments have also received a royal prefix, such as the Corps of Royal New Zealand Engineers, the Royal New Zealand Infantry Regiment, and the Royal New Zealand Army Logistic Regiment.

=== The Crown and Māori ===
Queen Elizabeth II wore a korowai (woven Māori cloak) during her first tour of New Zealand in 1953–54.

Māori interaction with the Crown dates back to 1832, when King William IV appointed James Busby as British resident. On 28 October 1835, Busby oversaw a hui held at Waitangi, at which a flag was selected for New Zealand and a declaration of independence written by Busby was signed by 36 Māori chiefs. Both were acknowledged the following year by the King in a letter from Lord Glenelg.

As a result, the declaration's ratification by the British Parliament in 1836, officials in the Colonial Office determined in 1839 that a treaty of cessation would need to be signed with Māori for the British Crown to acquire sovereignty over New Zealand. The Treaty of Waitangi was signed in 1840 by representatives of the British Crown and over 500 Māori chiefs, It is considered to be a founding document of government. The Treaty identifies the Crown's right to kāwanatanga, or "governorship", leading one Māori academic to argue that kāwanatanga, or His Majesty's Government in New Zealand, is party to the treaty.

Since the treaty's implementation, a number of petitions have been made by Māori directly to the sovereign in London, whom they felt they had a special relationship, the first coming from northern chiefs in 1852. This and all subsequent appeals were directed back to the sovereign's New Zealand ministers for advice on how to proceed. The results were not always favourable to Māori, who have communicated their discontent to the monarch or other royals; in response to a refusal by the Executive Council in 1981 to allow Mana Motuhake direct access to the Queen, Māori activist Dun Mihaka offered a traditional rebuke by baring his buttocks at the Prince and Princess of Wales. In a later incident Mihaka attempted to crash into the Queen's motorcade; he was intercepted by police before this happened.

In the Māori language, Queen Elizabeth II is sometimes referred to as te kōtuku-rerenga-tahi, meaning "the white heron of a single flight"; in Māori proverb, the rare white heron is a significant bird seen only once in a lifetime. In 1953, for her coronation, Elizabeth was given a kiwi feather korowai cloak, which she wore when attending a pōwhiri, or Māori welcoming ceremony, also speaking partly in Māori.

=== Royal symbols ===
References to the monarchy are commonplace in public life in New Zealand and represent one of the most recognisable ways the head of state is incorporated into New Zealand's national identity. Royal symbols may specifically distinguish institutions that derive their authority from the Crown (such as parliament), establishments with royal associations, or merely be ways of expressing loyal or patriotic sentiment.

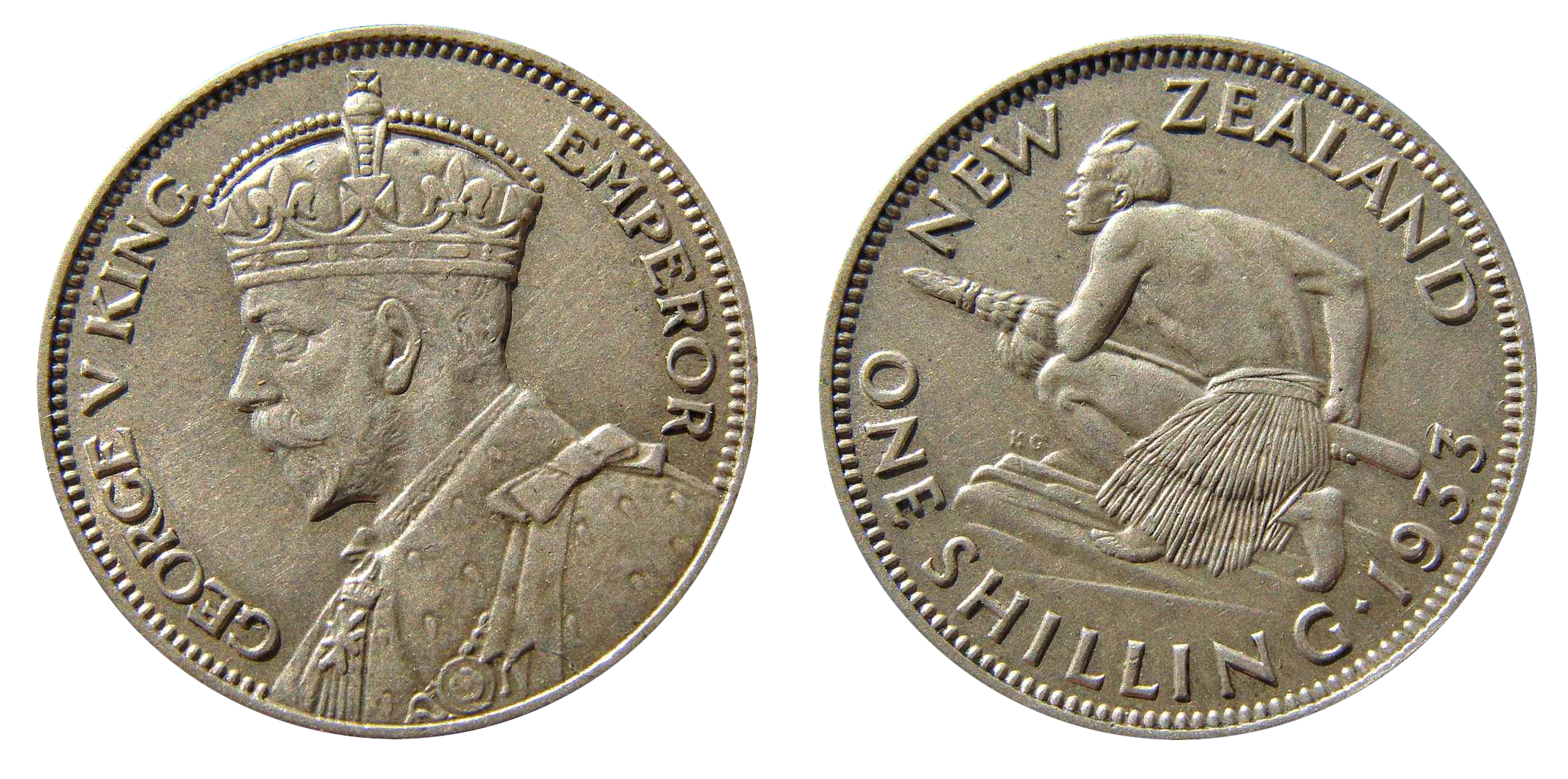
New Zealand shilling coin, 1933, featuring a profile of King George V on the obverse

The main symbol of the monarchy is the sovereign—Queen Elizabeth II, as of 2025, is still depicted on all coins and the twenty-dollar banknote. Postage stamps sometimes include the sovereign, such as the Queen Elizabeth II definitive stamp. There are references to St Edward's Crown, on New Zealand's coat of arms, on various medals, and awards. These latter cases reflect the monarch's place as the formal head of the New Zealand royal honours system. As such, only he can approve the creation of an honour, which he does as requested by the New Zealand Government. Though the monarch himself formally appoints members to the various orders, the governor-general administers most other responsibilities relating to New Zealand honours on the sovereign's behalf (such as investitures).

Queen Elizabeth II's personal flag, used in her capacity as Queen of New Zealand

Similar to coats of arms, flags are utilised to represent royal authority. A personal flag for use by the Queen in New Zealand was adopted in 1962. It features the shield design of the New Zealand coat of arms in the form of an oblong or square. Superimposed in the centre is a dark blue roundel bearing an initial 'E' surmounted by a crown, all within a gold chaplet of roses. The current monarch, King Charles III, has not adopted a personal flag for New Zealand.

Music and song are utilised in various ways as reminders and identifiers of the sovereign. New Zealand inherited the anthem "God Save the King" (or, alternatively, "God Save the Queen") from Britain. It remains one of the two national anthems, along with "God Defend New Zealand", but has been generally restricted to official occasions where the monarch, a member of the royal family, or the governor-general is in attendance for a particular purpose. The right to declare a song a national anthem currently rests with the sovereign.

As in other Commonwealth realms, the King's Birthday is a public holiday and, in New Zealand, is observed on the first Monday in June (not on the date of the monarch's actual birth). Celebrations are mainly official, including the Birthday Honours list and military ceremonies.

=== Organisations with royal patronage ===
To receive patronage, an organisation must prove to be long lasting, and to be of the highest standard in their field. These organisations, such as the Royal New Zealand Returned and Services' Association, signified by the prefix royal, have received patronage from various monarchs and their families. Royal patronage is the royal individual's decision to make, though the Ministry for Culture and Heritage will help organisations to seek patronage.

== Debate ==
Despite a similar level of political involvement by the monarchy in both countries, there is less agitation for ending the monarchy of New Zealand and creating a New Zealand republic than in neighbouring Australia, where the republicanism movement is stronger. Past public opinion polls have shown that while the majority of Australians are in favour of a republic, New Zealanders on average favour retaining the monarchy. Supporters of the monarchy claim that for New Zealand, "...monarchy summarises the inheritance of a thousand years of constitutional government and our links with a glorious past".

Neither National nor Labour, the two major political parties currently in parliament, have a stated policy of creating a republic. The National Party's declared principles include "Loyalty to... our Sovereign as Head of State". In 2008, former Prime Minister John Key, then Leader of the Opposition, said he is "not convinced [a republic] will be a big issue in the short term," but does believe that a republic is "inevitable." Former Deputy Prime Minister Michael Cullen declared that he supported the monarchy, stating in 2004 he was "a sort of token monarchist in the Cabinet these days." In 2010 he repudiated that stance, taking the view that New Zealand should move towards a republic once the Queen's reign ends. There are two special-interest groups representing both sides of the debate in New Zealand and arguing the issue in the media from time to time: Monarchy New Zealand and New Zealand Republic.

There are a number of legal issues to be addressed in order to abolish the monarchy, though individuals on both sides of the argument take a different view of the level of difficulty faced. Much of the unsurety involves the reserve powers of the sovereign; the relationship between the various regions of the Realm of New Zealand sharing the same sovereign (the absence of these matters from republican arguments having been criticised as a "self-centredness of republican discussions in New Zealand"); and effects on the relationship between the Crown and Māori, specifically, the continued legal status of the Treaty of Waitangi and its claims and settlements. Some academics expressed concern that governments could use republicanism to evade treaty responsibilities, while others, such as Professor Noel Cox, Chairman-Emeritus of Monarchy New Zealand, have argued a republic would not absolve the Government of its obligations under the treaty.

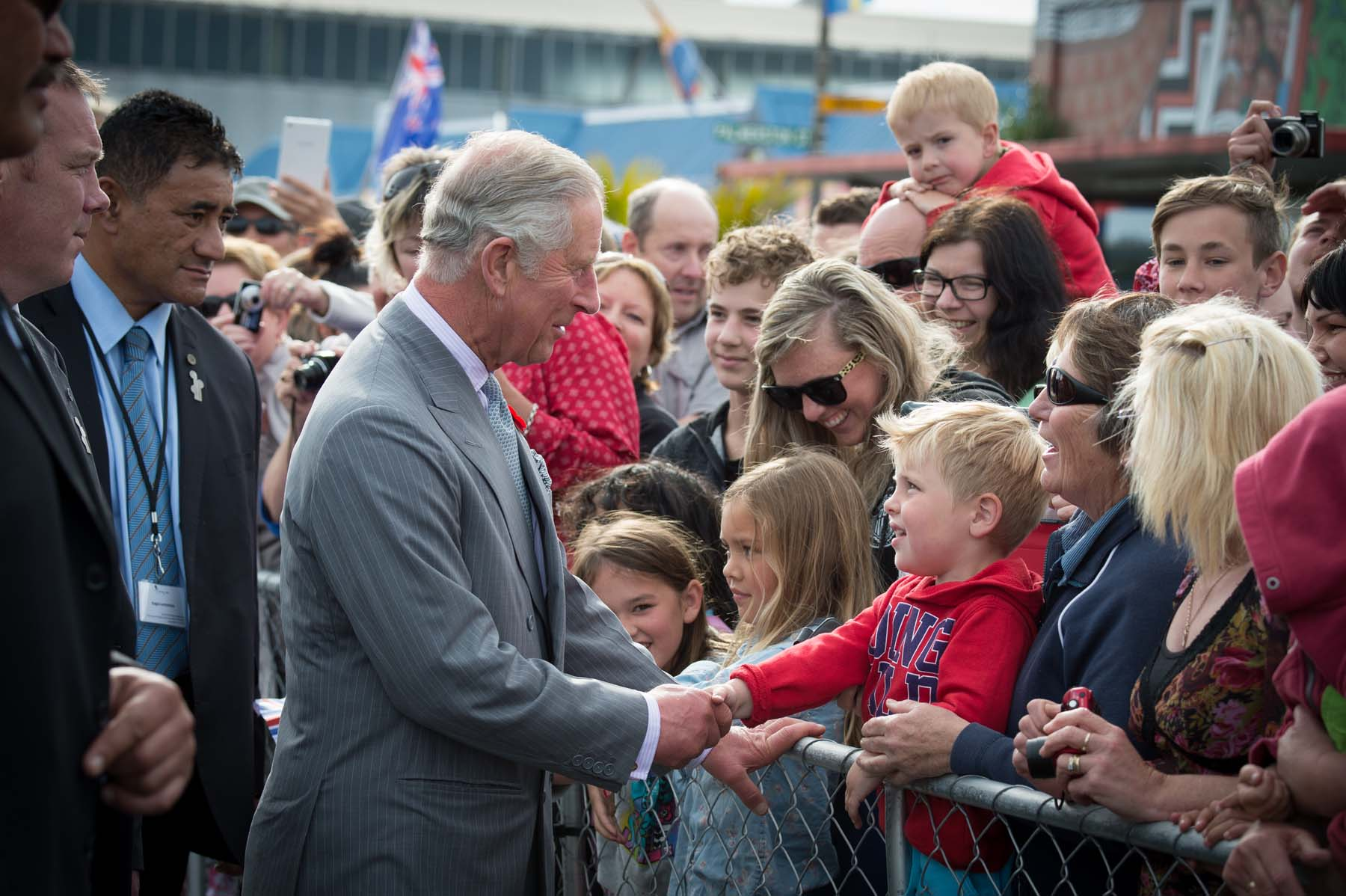
Charles (then Prince of Wales) greets a crowd in Westport, 7 November 2015

The institution enjoys the support of most New Zealanders, particularly those born before the Second World War. With the popular approval of Queen Elizabeth II, and the position of the Treaty of Waitangi under a republic remaining a concern to Māori and other New Zealanders alike, as well as the question of what constitutional form a republic might take unresolved, support for a republic has been no higher than one third to 40% of the population. Polls indicate that many New Zealanders see the monarchy as being of little day-to-day relevance; a One News/Colmar Brunton poll in 2002 found that 58% of the population believed the monarchy has little or no relevance to their lives. National Business Review poll in 2004 found 57% of respondents believed New Zealand would become a republic "in the future". On 21 April 2008, New Zealand Republic released a poll of New Zealanders showing 43% support the monarchy should Prince Charles become king of New Zealand, and 41% support a republic under the same scenario. A poll by The New Zealand Herald in January 2010, before a visit by Prince William to the country, found 33.3% wanted Prince Charles to be the next monarch, with 30.2% favouring Prince William. 29.4% of respondents preferred a republic in the event Queen Elizabeth died or abdicated.

On 14 October 2009, a bill put forward in parliament by Keith Locke to bring about a referendum on the monarchy was drawn from the ballot of members' bills and introduced into the legislative chamber. It had been presumed that this bill would have been binding in New Zealand only, having no effect in the Cook Islands or Niue. On 21 April 2010 the bill was defeated at its first reading 68–53, and did not continue through to select committee.

On the eve of a royal tour by Prince Charles and Camilla, Duchess of Cornwall, 10 November 2012, a One News/Colmar Brunton poll reported 70% of people questioned responded they wanted to "keep The Queen as head of state", while only 19% supported a republic. Following the tour, a poll by Curia Market Research commissioned by New Zealand Republic found 51% of respondents wanted Charles as King once the Queen's reign ends, while 41% supported a republic.

Support for the monarchy in New Zealand tends to increase during times where there is considerable focus on the royal family, whether this be due to royal tours or significant events such as a royal wedding.

== History ==
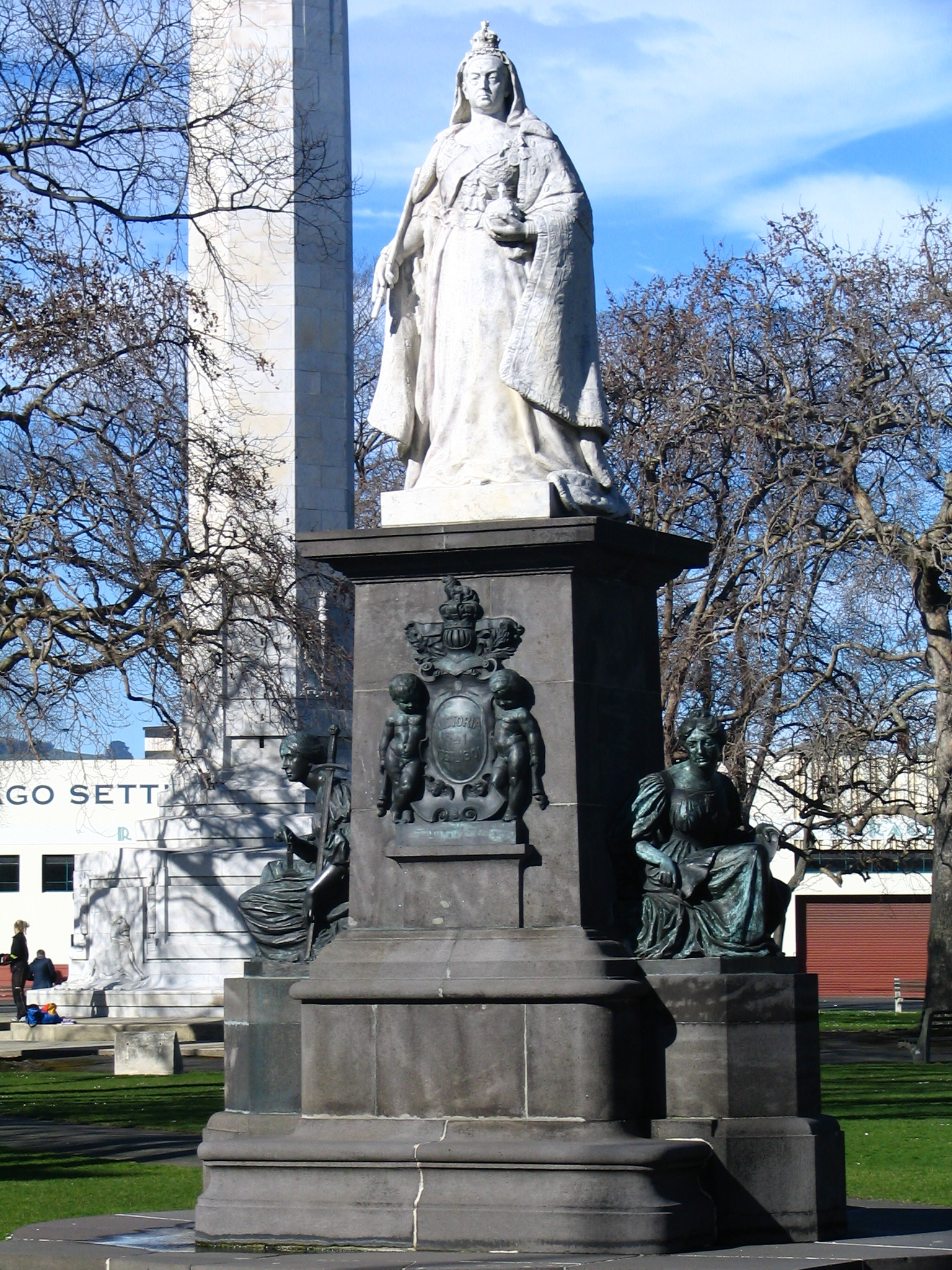
A statue of Queen Victoria in Queens Gardens, Dunedin

In the early 19th century, some Māori who visited London were introduced to British royalty. Moehanga (or Te Mahanga) of Ngāpuhi, the first Māori to visit England, claimed to have met King George III and Queen Charlotte in 1806. Other chiefs (rangatira) to meet the monarch include Hongi Hika, who met King George IV in 1820.

Lieutenant James Cook first sailed to New Zealand in 1769. There he mapped the entire coastline and tentatively claimed the land for King George III of the United Kingdom. Beginning in 1790, an increasing number of European settlers came to New Zealand. In 1833, with growing lawlessness amongst traders and settlers, the British government appointed James Busby as British resident to protect British trading interests. Despite Busby's presence, trouble increased and further action was needed. On 15 June 1839, the governor of the British colony of New South Wales, Sir George Gipps, issued a proclamation extending the boundaries of New South Wales to include such territory in New Zealand as might be acquired in sovereignty. The British government despatched Captain William Hobson to New Zealand to be lieutenant-governor under Gipps; Hobson was instructed to obtain sovereignty for the British Crown with the consent of Māori chiefs. The resultant Treaty of Waitangi was signed on 6 February 1840, at Waitangi in the Bay of Islands. This laid the foundation for the later proclamation of British sovereignty over New Zealand on 21 May 1840. Following that declaration, Britain decided to make New Zealand a separate colony, and a Charter for Erecting the Colony of New Zealand was issued on 16 November 1840. Queen Victoria thus became New Zealand's head of state.

In 1852, the New Zealand Constitution Act 1852 was passed, establishing responsible government in New Zealand. It also provided for the governor to grant the Royal Assent in the name of the sovereign.

Queen Victoria's second son, Prince Alfred, Duke of Edinburgh, became the first British royal to visit New Zealand. He landed in Wellington on 11 April 1869, aboard his ship HMS Galatea.

In 1907, New Zealand achieved the status of 'Dominion', which denoted that it was a country of the British Empire (and later the Commonwealth of Nations) with autonomy in domestic and foreign affairs. In 1917, letters patent of King George V set out the powers, duties and responsibilities of the governor-general and the Executive Council. The governor-general remained an appointee of the British Crown on the advice of the British Cabinet.

The concept of a fully independent New Zealand sharing the person of the sovereign with the United Kingdom and other countries only emerged gradually over time through constitutional convention. A series of Imperial Conferences held in London, from 1917 on, resulted in the Balfour Declaration of 1926, which provided that the United Kingdom and the Dominions were to be considered as "autonomous communities within the British Empire, equal in status, in no way subordinate to one another in any aspect of their domestic or external affairs, though united by a common allegiance to the Crown". The governor-general of New Zealand, as with all the other governors-general of the Dominions, became the direct representative of the monarch in person, rather than a diplomatic channel between the New Zealand and British governments.

The Crown was further separated amongst its Dominions by the Statute of Westminster in 1931, an Act of the British parliament, which gave New Zealand and other Dominions the authority to make their own laws in all matters, while requiring them all to seek each other's assent for changes to monarchical titles and the common line of succession. The British Parliament specifically gave up any claim to legislate for a Dominion, save at its own request. New Zealand ratified the Statute in 1947, after the passing of the Statute of Westminster Adoption Act 1947. A convention persisted that New Zealand prime ministers consulted the British government on the appointment of governors-general until 1967.

Although the New Zealand monarchy is now independent, there remains a strong association with the British monarchy and its history. For example, there are many portraits of earlier (pre-1840) English kings and queens in New Zealand government buildings, including Government House, Wellington. Several royal portraits were gifted by Governor-General Lord Norrie.

I look forward to continuing to serve to the best of my ability in the years to come. It fills me with great pride to stand before you here today to express my lasting respect and deep affection for this country and for New Zealanders everywhere.

— Queen Elizabeth II, 25 February 2002

One of the first post-Second World War examples of New Zealand's status as an independent monarchy was the alteration of the monarch's title in 1953. For the first time, the official New Zealand title mentioned New Zealand separately from the United Kingdom and the other realms, to highlight the sovereign's role specifically as king/queen of New Zealand under the concept of the 'divisible crown'. Elizabeth II's title at that time was Queen of the United Kingdom, New Zealand and Her Other Realms and Territories. Accordingly, the name of the country in official usage was also changed to the Realm of New Zealand. The Royal Titles Act 1974 further revised the monarch's New Zealand title to remove the reference to the United Kingdom.

More recently, the Constitution Act 1986 has become the principal formal statement of New Zealand's constitution. This law formally establishes that the sovereign (in Right of New Zealand) is the head of state of New Zealand and that the governor-general is his representative; each can, in general, exercise all the powers of the other. (Note: The Constitution Act also repealed and replaced the Statute of Westminster, and removed the remaining ability of the British parliament to intervene in New Zealand constitutional affairs.)

== List of monarchs ==
Listed here are the seven monarchs who have reigned over New Zealand—the British colony of New Zealand, from 1840; followed by the Dominion of New Zealand, beginning in 1907; and finally the present-day sovereign state of New Zealand. Originally, these monarchs reigned in their right as British sovereigns.

Portrait	Regnal name Māori language (Birth–Death)	Reign		Full name	Consort	House
Portrait	Regnal name Māori language (Birth–Death)	Start	End	Full name	Consort	House
	Victoria; Wikitōria (1819–1901)	21 May 1840 (Note: Queen Victoria reigned as British sovereign from 20 June 1837. British sovereignty over New Zealand was proclaimed on 21 May 1840 by Lieutenant-Governor William Hobson.)	22 January 1901	Alexandrina Victoria	Albert of Saxe-Coburg and Gotha	Hanover
	Victoria; Wikitōria (1819–1901)	Governors: William Hobson, Robert FitzRoy, Sir George Grey, Thomas Gore Browne, Sir George Ferguson Bowen, Sir George Ferguson Bowen, Marquess of Normanby, Sir Hercules Robinson, Sir Arthur Hamilton-Gordon, Sir William Jervois, Earl of Onslow, Earl of Glasgow, Earl of Ranfurly				
	Victoria; Wikitōria (1819–1901)	Premiers/Prime ministers: Henry Sewell, Sir William Fox, Sir Edward Stafford, Alfred Domett, Sir Frederick Whitaker, Sir Frederick Weld, George Waterhouse, Sir Julius Vogel, Daniel Pollen, Sir Harry Atkinson, Sir George Grey, Sir John Hall, Sir Robert Stout, John Ballance, Richard Seddon				
	Edward VII; Eruera te Tuawhitu (1841–1910)	22 January 1901	6 May 1910	Albert Edward	Alexandra of Denmark	Saxe-Coburg and Gotha
	Edward VII; Eruera te Tuawhitu (1841–1910)	Governors: Earl of Ranfurly, Lord Plunket				
	Edward VII; Eruera te Tuawhitu (1841–1910)	Prime ministers: Richard Seddon, Sir William Hall-Jones, Sir Joseph Ward				
	George V Hōri te Tuarima (1865–1936)	6 May 1910	20 January 1936	George Frederick Ernest Albert	Mary of Teck	Windsor (Note: Saxe-Coburg and Gotha until 1917, and Windsor thereafter)
	George V Hōri te Tuarima (1865–1936)	Governors/Governors-general: Lord Plunket, Lord Islington, Earl of Liverpool, Viscount Jellicoe, Sir Charles Fergusson, Lord Bledisloe, Viscount Galway				
	George V Hōri te Tuarima (1865–1936)	Prime ministers: Sir Joseph Ward, Sir Thomas Mackenzie, William Massey, Sir Francis Bell, Gordon Coates, George Forbes, Michael Joseph Savage				
	Edward VIII; Eruera te Tuawaru (1894–1972)	20 January 1936	11 December 1936	Edward Albert Christian George Andrew Patrick David	None	Windsor
	Edward VIII; Eruera te Tuawaru (1894–1972)	Governor-general: Viscount Galway				
	Edward VIII; Eruera te Tuawaru (1894–1972)	Prime minister: Michael Joseph Savage				
	George VI; Hōri te Tuaono (1895–1952)	11 December 1936	6 February 1952	Albert Frederick Arthur George	Elizabeth Bowes-Lyon	Windsor
	George VI; Hōri te Tuaono (1895–1952)	Governors-general: Viscount Galway, Sir Cyril Newall, Lord Freyberg				
	George VI; Hōri te Tuaono (1895–1952)	Prime ministers: Michael Joseph Savage, Peter Fraser, Sir Sidney Holland				
	Elizabeth II; Irihāpeti te Tuarua (1926–2022)	6 February 1952	8 September 2022	Elizabeth Alexandra Mary	Philip Mountbatten	Windsor
	Elizabeth II; Irihāpeti te Tuarua (1926–2022)	Governors-general: Lord Freyberg, Sir Willoughby Norrie, Viscount Cobham, Sir Bernard Fergusson, Sir Arthur Porritt, Sir Denis Blundell, Sir Keith Holyoake, Sir David Beattie, Sir Paul Reeves, Dame Catherine Tizard, Sir Michael Hardie Boys, Dame Silvia Cartwright, Sir Anand Satyanand, Sir Jerry Mateparae, Dame Patsy Reddy, Dame Cindy Kiro				
	Elizabeth II; Irihāpeti te Tuarua (1926–2022)	Prime ministers: Sir Sidney Holland, Sir Keith Holyoake, Sir Walter Nash, Sir Jack Marshall, Norman Kirk, Sir Bill Rowling, Sir Robert Muldoon, David Lange, Sir Geoffrey Palmer, Mike Moore, Jim Bolger, Dame Jenny Shipley, Helen Clark, Sir John Key, Sir Bill English, Dame Jacinda Ardern				
	Charles III; Tiāre te Tuatoru (born 1948)	8 September 2022	present	Charles Philip Arthur George	Camilla Shand	Windsor
	Charles III; Tiāre te Tuatoru (born 1948)	Governors-general: Dame Cindy Kiro				
	Charles III; Tiāre te Tuatoru (born 1948)	Prime ministers: Dame Jacinda Ardern, Chris Hipkins, Christopher Luxon				

== See also ==
- Māori King Movement
- Monarchy in the Cook Islands
- Monarchies in Oceania
- List of monarchies
- Royal Train (New Zealand)
