= Newell (surname) =

Newell (/ˈnjuːəl/) is a surname of English origin, and may refer to:

== Academics ==
- Alan C. Newell, Irish-American applied mathematician
- Eric Newell, Canadian businessman and university chancellor
- Frederick Haynes Newell (1862–1932), first director of the United States Reclamation Service
- Linda King Newell, Latter-Day Saint historian
- Norman D. Newell (1909 –2005), American naturalist
- William E. Newell, author and scientist

== Literature ==
- Mindy Newell, American comics writer
- William Wells Newell, American folklorist

== Music ==
- Laura Newell (1854–1916), American songwriter
- Martin Newell (born 1953)
- Norman Newell (1919–2004), English record producer and lyricist
- Richard Newell, blues musician
- James Newell Osterberg Jr., known professionally as Iggy Pop

== Politics ==
- Dave Newell (1946–2016), American politician from Nebraska
- John Newell (Queensland politician) (1849–1932), Australian politician from Queensland
- Robert Newell (politician) (1807–1869), American fur trader and politician from Oregon
- William A. Newell (1817–1901), American politician from New Jersey and Washington
- Emily Newell Blair (1877–1951), American writer, suffragette, and founder of League of Women Voters

== Sports ==
- Asa Newell (born 2005), American basketball player
- Isaac Newell (1853–1907), English-born Argentine educator and pioneer of Argentine football
- Joe Newell (born 1993), English footballer
- Mike Newell (footballer) (born 1965), football player and manager
- Pete Newell (1915–2008), Canadian-born American basketball coach and NBA general manager
- William E. "Pinky" Newell, athletic trainer

== Technology ==
- Allen Newell (1927–1992), American researcher and artificial intelligence pioneer
- Alton Newell (1913–2000), American industrialist and inventor of the Newell Shredder
- Dick Newell, British businessman and technologist
- Gabe Newell (born 1962), American computer entrepreneur
- Martin Newell (computer scientist), British-born computer scientist

== Television, theater and film ==
- Alex Newell (1992–), American actor and singer
- Colin Newell (1973–2020), British TV personality
- David Newell, Mr. McFeely from Mister Rogers' Neighborhood
- Lloyd D. Newell, American broadcaster
- Mike Newell (director) (1942—), English film director
- Patrice Newell, Australian broadcaster
- Patrick Newell, British actor

== Other ==
- Claire Newell, Canadian travel expert and business woman
- Edward Theodore Newell (1886–1941), numismatist
- Lawrence Newell, Papua New Guinean lawyer
- Lucy Newell (artist) (1906–1987), Australian artist
- Robert Newell (VC), British soldier
- Samuel Newell (1784–1821), American missionary to India
- Susan Newell (1893–1923), last woman to be hanged in Scotland

== See also ==
- Newall (disambiguation)
- Newel (disambiguation)
