= Newall =

Newall may refer to:

== People ==
- Baron Newall, title in the Peerage of the United Kingdom
- Cyril Newall, 1st Baron Newall (1886-1963), British Marshal of the RAF
- Danny Newall, Welsh footballer
- Dennis Newall, Scottish football manager
- Francis Newall, 2nd Baron Newall (born 1930), British businessman and politician
- George Newall, American songwriter
- George E. Newall (died 1919), Michigan politician
- Guy Newall (1885-1937), British actor
- Hugh Newall (1857–1944), British astrophysicist
- Jock Newall (1917-2004), New Zealand international football (soccer) player
- Queenie Newall (1854-1929), British archer
- Robert Stirling Newall (1812-1889), British engineer and astronomer
- Stuart Newall (1843-1919), New Zealand soldier
- Ted Newall (1935-2012), Canadian businessman
- Walter Newall (1780-1863), Scottish architect and civil engineer

== Other uses ==
- Newall, West Yorkshire, England
- Mount Newall, Antarctica
- Newall Glacier, Antarctica
- Newall Telescope

== See also ==
- Newall Green, an area in Manchester, England
- Newel (disambiguation)
- Newell (disambiguation)
- Newill (surname)
