= Newell =

Newell may refer to:

== Places ==
=== Australia ===
- Newell, Queensland, a locality in the Shire of Douglas
- Newell Highway, New South Wales

=== Canada ===
- County of Newell, a municipal district in Alberta

=== England ===
- Newell, an old spelling of Newall, West Yorkshire

=== United States ===
- Newell, Alabama
- Newell, California
- Newell, Iowa
- Newell, North Carolina
- Newell, Ohio
- Newell, Pennsylvania
- Newell, South Dakota
- Newell, West Virginia
- Newell Township (disambiguation)

== Other uses ==
- Newell (surname)
- Newell Brands, an American consumer products company
- Newell's Old Boys, an Argentine sports club
- USS Newell (DE-322), U.S. Navy Edsall-class destroyer escort

== See also ==
- Newall (disambiguation)
- Newel (disambiguation)
- Newill (surname)
