= Hugh Trenchard as commander of the Royal Flying Corps in France =

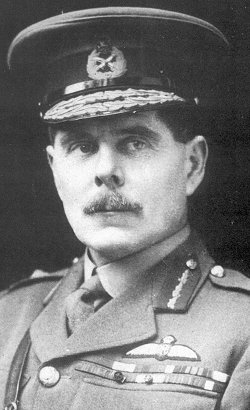
Trenchard in the uniform of the Royal Flying Corps

Hugh Trenchard was the commander of the Royal Flying Corps in France from 25 August 1915 until 2 January 1918.

== Appointment and style of command ==
In the summer of 1915, General Sir David Henderson decided that, despite his personal preferences, a general officer with technical knowledge and recent war experience was required at the War Office to argue for the resources needed by the RFC. Being the only suitable candidate, Henderson arranged for his return to Great Britain and recommended that he be succeeded by Trenchard. Kitchener immediately approved the recommendation and on 25 August 1915, Trenchard was promoted to brigadier-general and appointed Officer Commanding the RFC in the Field. As the Flying Corps' field commander, Trenchard was far more personally involved in the detail of his wing commanders' and squadrons commanders' tasks than Henderson had been. Trenchard instigated tighter controls on the Flying Corps' tactical training programme, dealt with the unending challenge of providing for material shortages and required his airmen to adopt a more aggressive posture. During this time Trenchard was greatly helped by his aide-de-camp, Maurice Baring.

== The Battle of Loos, the Fokker Scourge and the Battle of Verdun ==
In late September 1915, Trenchard oversaw the Flying Corps' contribution to the Battle of Loos. The improved artillery cooperation and air-to-ground wireless communications yielded good results for the British. Additionally, the Battle was significant as the first successful tactical bombing operation in the history of military aviation that was carried out by the Flying Corps. Despite this, the battle was inconclusive and Trenchard had hoped that his airmen might have achieved more.

By the autumn of 1915, the Flying Corps had to contend with a new difficulty, the so-called "Fokker Scourge". The recently introduced Fokkers, with their synchronization gears which permitted a machine gun to fire through the arc of the propeller without striking its blades, outperformed the British aircraft. Trenchard struggled to maintain air superiority and the Flying Corps' losses slowly but surely exceeded the replacements, thanks in no small part to Trenchard's insistence on offensive operations and the greater tactical flexibility of the Germans. With the land campaign going through a period of limited activity, Trenchard scaled back the air support to land operations. Although the technological edge remained with the Germans, several modifications were made to Trenchard's aircraft such as the introduction of Lewis guns in the BE biplanes and by early 1916 the Flying Corps had received new fighter aircraft types and began to respond to Fokker attacks on more even terms. In December 1915, Haig replaced Sir John French as Commander of the British Expeditionary Force and the Haig-Trenchard partnership resumed, this time at a higher level.

During the early stages of the Battle of Verdun in 1916, Trenchard supplied Lewis guns, bullets and bombsights to the French Air Service which was under the command of Paul-Fernaud du Peuty. Later in the battle, de Peuty switched from a defensive to an offensive air posture, at least in part due to the influence of Trenchard. In March, with the Flying Corps expanding, Trenchard was promoted to major-general.

== The Battle of the Somme, Bloody April and the Battle of Arras ==
In the days before the Battle of the Somme, Trenchard ordered that reconnaissance sorties be flown and German observation kite balloons be targeted. On the eve of battle, Trenchard had mustered 105 aircraft to the rear of the Fourth Army and with the commencement of the battle, Trenchard brought his squadrons systematically into action. Low-level bombing was a major task for the participating aircraft and many were shot down. Despite the losses, by mid-August the Flying Corps had succeeded in gaining air supremacy in the skies over the Somme. However, by September 1916 the prospects of a German collapse were remote and Trenchard feared that the Flying Corps in its weakened state was vulnerable to a German recovery in the air. Trenchard appealed to the War Office and even to the Admiralty for replacements in number but these were not initially forthcoming. By mid-September the German Air Service had regained some strength and Flying Corps began to take casualties in greater numbers. The Flying Corps' decline in numbers impaired their ability to provide accurate artillery support and although in late October a naval squadron was provided from Dunkirk, the British remained weak in the air.

After the conclusion of the Battle of the Somme, Trenchard's Flying Corps remained in a weakened state and all along the Front, Trenchard's aircraft were still fighting those of the German Air Service. In November 1916, Haig, on Trenchard's urging, sought a further 20 squadrons of fighters and in December, Trenchard travelled to London to appeal in person for additional fighters. With his words failing to produce the desired aircraft, Trenchard repeatedly wrote to Henderson and Brancker and when Trenchard went over Henderson's head to the President of the Air Board Lord Cowdray, Henderson severely reprimanded him.

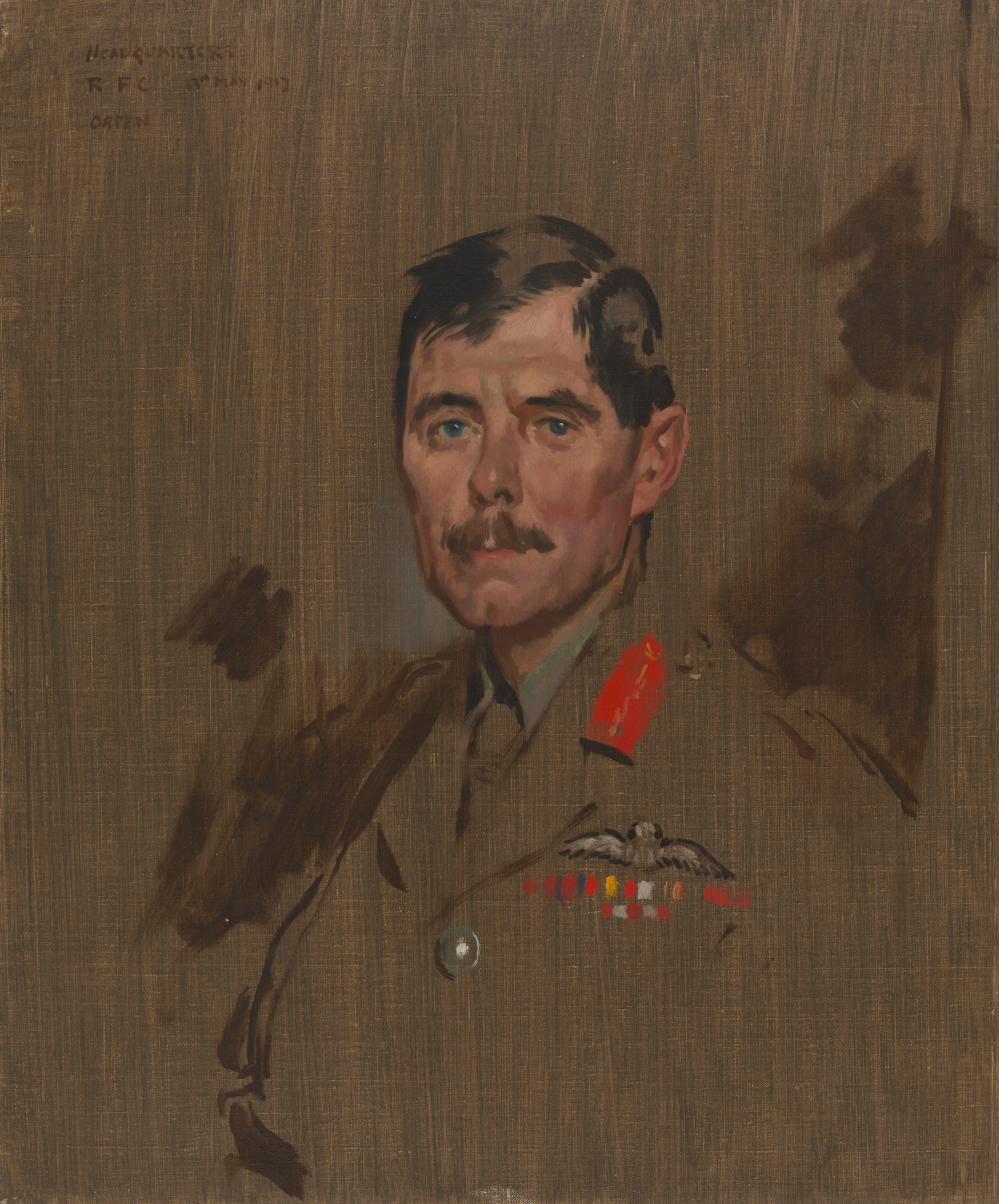
Trenchard at the Flying Corps' general headquarters, May 1917, by William Orpen

While the winter weather gave some respite from the struggle in the air, the appearance of better weather in March 1917 brought a fresh offensive from the German Air Service. Trenchard was forced to cut back his offensive activity to a minimum although he continued to provide support to the British infantry as they slowly advanced to the Hindenburg Line. In April the Flying Corps supported the infantry as best it could during the Battle of Arras and engaged the Germans in a fierce air battle, known as Bloody April, in the skies overhead. Overall, from March to May, Trenchard lost 1270 aircraft and coupled with the production crisis in Great Britain this almost resulted in the destruction of the Flying Corps.

By mid-1917 William Weir's actions in getting British aircraft production working had started to bear fruit. The newly supplied S.E.5s, Bristol Fighters and de Havilland 4s enabled Trenchard to dominate the airspace along the Front before and during the Battle of Messines. Although the Flying Corps' reserves remained low, Trenchard and his staff were then able to begin planning for Haig's upcoming offensive at Ypres.

== Bombing raids on London ==
In June 1917, the Gotha raid on London led to a public outcry and Trenchard was summoned to see the Prime Minister, Lloyd George. Trenchard outlined the general air situation and provided recommendations for action. Lloyd George pressed for Mannheim to be bombed forthwith which Trenchard resisted, seeing it as a tokenistic attempt at revenge. However, on his return to France, Trenchard did begin making preparations for a strategic bombing campaign against the Germans and contrary to his advice two fighter squadrons were withdrawn from the Front and assigned to daylight patrolling duties over the English Channel. The German Air Service capitalized on the Flying Corps' weakened state in France, bombing towns, trenches, ammunition dumps and depots. The British corps commanders then pressed Trenchard to make air protection his top priority which Trenchard rejected as he was focussed on bombing and reconnoitring the German rear in preparation for Haig's next offensive.

After London was bombed for a second time, the Government tasked General Jan Smuts with investigating the arrangements for governing the British air services. His report was issued by August 1917 and it recommended the establishment of an independent air force which would be managed by its own government ministry. Trenchard received an advanced copy and expressed his disagreement. In Trenchard's view, the disruption that would be caused by merging the two air services and particularly by creating a separate ministry would detract from the vital task of pressing home the recently gained advantages in the air over the Western Front.

From 28 September to 1 October, German Gothas and Zeppelins bombed London once more. The British Cabinet wanted immediate action and Trenchard was summoned from France again. Trenchard arrived by air on 2 October, making an emergency landing at Lympne in Kent after the flight of aircraft carrying him and his staff had been mistaken for a German air raid. On his arrival in London, Trenchard briefed the Cabinet that his first bomber airfield at Ochey near Nancy was ready and Lloyd George urged that the bombing begin as soon as possible. Trenchard's visit to the British capital also afforded him the opportunity of discussing the future of the air services with Smuts. Trenchard stated his concerns, in particular that the planning for a future air force was based upon grossly unrealistic figures for aircraft production.

== Strategic bombing of German industry ==
In October, British bombers arrived at Ochey and became the first elements of the newly created 41st Wing under the command of Lieutenant-Colonel Cyril Newall. Preparations for bombing missions then began in earnest and only six days later two flights of de Havilland aircraft conducted the Flying Corps' first long-range bombing mission. The Burbach iron foundry was hit, as were other buildings and railway lines. A week later Handley Page aircraft of the 41st Wing conducted the first night-time bombing raid at long range. Bombing continued into November until the winter weather commenced.

In London, the propaganda value of the raids was what mattered most to the Government and Trenchard was praised as a commander and organizer of the highest order. Trenchard himself disliked conducting a campaign to satisfy political concerns even though he had the freedom to select targets. More specifically, Trenchard wished to concentrate his forces on supporting the Army rather than divide his limited number of aircraft between two unrelated bombing campaigns.

== Replacement ==
During December 1917, Trenchard remained GOC the Royal Flying Corps in the Field and spent Christmas at his old headquarters at Saint-Omer. There had been much discussion about whether Trenchard might continue as GOC whilst simultaneously holding the post of Chief of the Air Staff in the soon to be created Royal Air Force. In the end it was decided that such an arrangement was impractical and Trenchard was succeeded in France by Major-General John Salmond.
