= Independent Air Force =

Independent Air Force Inter-Allied Independent Air Force from 26 October 1918
- Active: 6 June – 14 November 1918
- Allegiance: United Kingdom; Allies of World War I from 26 October 1918
- Engagements: First World War

Commanders
- GOC: Sir Hugh Trenchard
- Commander-in-Chief: Sir Hugh Trenchard
- GOC: C L Courtney

The Independent Air Force (IAF), also known as the Independent Force or the Independent Bombing Force and later known as the Inter-Allied Independent Air Force, was a First World War strategic bombing force which was part of Britain's Royal Air Force and was used to strike against German railways, aerodromes, and industrial centres without co-ordination with the Army or Navy.

== Establishment ==
From late 1916 to early 1917 the Royal Naval Air Service (RNAS) had attempted a co-ordinated series of bombing raids on German-held targets. Whilst the attacks were generally unsuccessful the principle of deep penetration bombing raids against strategic targets was established. General Jan Smuts, a member of the War Cabinet, prepared the Smuts Report which recommended that a separate Air Ministry and Air Force should be set up, independent of the Army and Navy and that a strategic bomber force should be formed whose sole purpose was to attack Germany.

Following the perceived success in bombing Germany of the VIII Brigade and its antecedent formation the 41st Wing, the British Government decided that it should be expanded into an independent force. Before the creation of the Independent Air Force, the VIII Brigade was under the tactical command of Field Marshal Sir Douglas Haig.

After Parliamentary approval in November 1917, the Royal Air Force was born on 1 April 1918 and the forthcoming creation of the Independent Air Force was announced on 13 May 1918. The General Officer Commanding was to be Major-General Trenchard who had recently stepped down as Chief of the Air Staff. Trenchard had only agreed to serve as GOC after he received criticism for resigning his position as professional head of the RAF during a time of war. The deputy commander was Brigadier-General Cyril Newall who had previously been the commander of the VIII Brigade.

The Independent Air Force came into being on 6 June 1918 with its headquarters situated near Nancy in France. Trenchard took over tactical command of the VIII Brigade from Haig on 5 June 1918 and complete control on 15 June 1918, when Newall became the deputy commander of the Independent Force. As commander, Trenchard reported directly to Sir William Weir the Air Minister, bypassing the Chief of the Air Staff, Frederick Sykes.

== Composition ==
The Independent Air Force eventually consisted of nine squadrons of aircraft which were equipped with

- de Havilland DH4s
- de Havilland DH9s and de Havilland DH.9As
- Handley Page 0/400s
- Royal Aircraft Factory FE2bs
- Sopwith Camels for escort duties

No 41 Wing was split into two wings to form VIII Brigade and comprised Nos 55, 99 and 104 squadrons responsible for day-bombing, with the 83rd Wing consisted of two night-bombing squadrons, (No 100 and No 216). Additional squadrons were added to the IAF before the Armistice; Nos 97, 115 and 215 squadrons (equipped with the new Handley-Page 0/400 bomber) and No 110 Squadron with the DH-9A, operational through the summer of 1918.

== Actions ==
The IAF commenced operations in June 1918, when 12 DH4s of 55 Squadron were despatched to bomb targets around Coblenz and 11 DH4s of 99 Squadron attacked rail targets at Thionville. During the last five months of World War I, Independent Air Force aircraft dropped 550 long tons (560 t) of bombs (for 109 aircraft lost) including 390 long tons (400 t) dropped by night. Over 220 long tons (220 t) were dropped on German aerodromes, which Trenchard justified by pointing out that while the Germans were stronger than the British in the air, their aircraft might be destroyed on the ground. Trenchard argued that his policy was vindicated by the fact the during the period from 5 June to 11 November 1918, German attacks on British aerodromes were minimal and no British aircraft were destroyed on the ground by bombing.

The Independent Forces attacked, amongst others, the following targets:

- Baalon
- Baden
- The Black Forest
- Bonn
- Cologne
- Coblenz
- Darmstadt
- Duren
- Dillingen
- Frankfurt
- Forbach
- Hagendingen
- Heidelberg
- Hagenau
- Kaiserlautern
- Karthaus
- Karlsruhe
- Ludwigshafen
- Landau
- Mainz
- Mannheim
- Lahr
- Lumes
- Luxembourg
- Oberndorf am Neckar
- Offenburg
- Pforzheim
- Pirmasens
- Rastatt
- Rombas
- Rottweil
- Sollingen
- Saarburg
- Saarbrücken
- Stuttgart
- Treves
- Wiesbaden
- Worms
- Völklingen
- Wadgassen
- Zweibrücken

A considerable portion of the Independent Air Force’s efforts was in tactical support of the Allied armies and the war ended before the IAF could conduct any sustained strategic bombing. Thus the Independent Force achieved little material effect on the German war industries, in return for many losses in men and machines.

== Independent Air Force personnel ==
The future King George VI of the United Kingdom served in a ground post. W.E. Johns, creator of Biggles, flew as a bomber pilot.

== Inter-Allied Independent Air Force ==
Just before the end of the war, on 26 October 1918, the Independent Air Force was renamed the Inter-Allied Independent Air Force and comprised British, French, Italian and American squadrons. Trenchard remained the commander-in-chief but he came under the command of Marshal Ferdinand Foch, the Generalissimo of Allied forces. On 14 November, the Inter-Allied Independent Air Force was dissolved and its British squadrons (still titled the Independent Air Force) were assigned to John Salmond, the commander of the RAF in the field and Brigadier-General Christopher Courtney succeeded Trenchard. The Independent Air Force was disbanded in late 1918 or early 1919.
