= VIII Brigade RAF =

The VIII Brigade or 8th Brigade of the Royal Flying Corps and from 1 April 1918, Royal Air Force, was a bomber formation which carried out air raids against Germany in the First World War.

The VIII Brigade of the Royal Flying Corps was created on 28 December 1917 by raising the 41st Wing to Brigade status. The 41st Wing continued to exist as a subordinate formation of the VIII Brigade. The VIII Brigade's only Commander was Brigadier-General C. L. N. Newall.

Although the VIII Brigade had been established in December 1917 it did not exercise command authority until 1 February 1918, when Newall took command. The following month, on 1 April 1918, the VII Brigade was transferred to the Royal Air Force. With the British Government seeking to expand the bombing raids against Germany, the VIII Brigade itself was subsumed into a larger formation, becoming part of the Independent Air Force on 6 June 1918.
