= Royal Titles Act 1974 =

Act of Parliament in New Zealand

New Zealand Parliament
- Passed: 1974
- Commenced: Immediate
- Introduced by: Norman Kirk

Related legislation
- Royal Titles Act 1953
- Status: Current legislation

The Royal Titles Act 1974 changed the official title of the Queen of New Zealand to "Elizabeth the Second, by the Grace of God Queen of New Zealand and Her Other Realms and Territories, Head of the Commonwealth, Defender of the Faith". Elizabeth II's original title in New Zealand described her as "Elizabeth II, by the Grace of God of the United Kingdom, New Zealand and Her Other Realms and Territories Queen, Head of the Commonwealth, Defender of the Faith".

The Act was part of a programme of nationalism on the part of the third Labour government. However it was unanimously supported in parliament and, unusually, all three stages of the bill were passed in a single sitting.

== Debates ==
- New Zealand Parliamentary Debates vol.389, pp. 1–3.
