= Newill =

Newill is a surname. Notable people with the surname include:

- Edward Newill (1877–1954), Archdeacon of Dorking, England
- James Newill (1911–1975), American actor and singer
- Mary J. Newill (1860–1947), English painter, embroiderer, etc.

== See also ==
- Newall (disambiguation)
- Newell (disambiguation)
