= Alton Newell =

American industrialist

- Alton Newell
- Born: August 19, 1913; Oklahoma, U.S.
- Died: March 29, 2000 (aged 86); Houston, Texas, U.S.
- Occupation: Founder of Newell Industries

Alton Scott Newell Sr. (August 19, 1913 – March 29, 2000) was an American industrialist who invented the Newell Shredder and founded Newell Industries.

== Early life ==
Alton Newell was born to an Oklahoma family of migrant workers in 1913. During his childhood his family moved to California where Newell was forced to cease his schooling in the 10th grade in order to help support his family. After working a variety of jobs, Newell found himself in the position of managing a scrap yard. Tasked with scrapping cars by hand, which required one man ten hours of work to complete, Newell sought to find a more efficient method. In 1938, Newell moved to Texas and bought a small scrap yard and constructed a portable metal baler to assist in processing scrap metal.

== Newell Industries ==
Having expanded his scrap business to incorporate a number of plants across the Southwest, Newell recognized the need for tin for use in copper mining. Taking inspiration from a grain crusher he had seen as a child in Kansas, he designed a shredding machine to process tin cans.

This machine provided the basis for the design of a larger shredder capable of processing ferrous material such as that found in automobiles. What is now known as the Newell Shredder originated from this machine, a 500 HP (370 KW) top-discharge shredder incorporating a limited feed device that controlled the rate at which materials entered the machine. This design also included a "reject door" that allowed the machine to reject unshreddable materials, greatly reducing downtime. This machine was significantly smaller and more efficient than previous designs which had used motors as large as 6,000 HP (4,440 KW). Due to the novel features which Newell incorporated, he applied for a patent in 1965. He was granted patent number 3,482,788 in 1969.

The Newell Shredder was declared a National Historic Mechanical Engineering Landmark on September 16, 1994, by The American Society of Mechanical Engineers.

These shredders were manufactured and sold by Newell Industries. Upon Newell's death, Newell Industries was divided among his children. Modern Newell Shredders are currently manufactured and sold by The Shredder Company, which was founded by Newell's son and grandson, Alton Scott Newell Jr and Alton Scott Newell III.
