= Moehanga =

First Māori to set foot on British soil

Te Mahanga (also "Moehanga," "Mahanga," or "Moyhanger"), was a Māori man from the Ngāpuhi iwi, located on the northern end of New Zealand's North Island, and the first Māori to set foot on British soil in 1806.

== Journey to London ==
Te Mahanga was the first Māori to visit the United Kingdom. In 1806, a whaler, formerly HMS Ferret, was in the region.

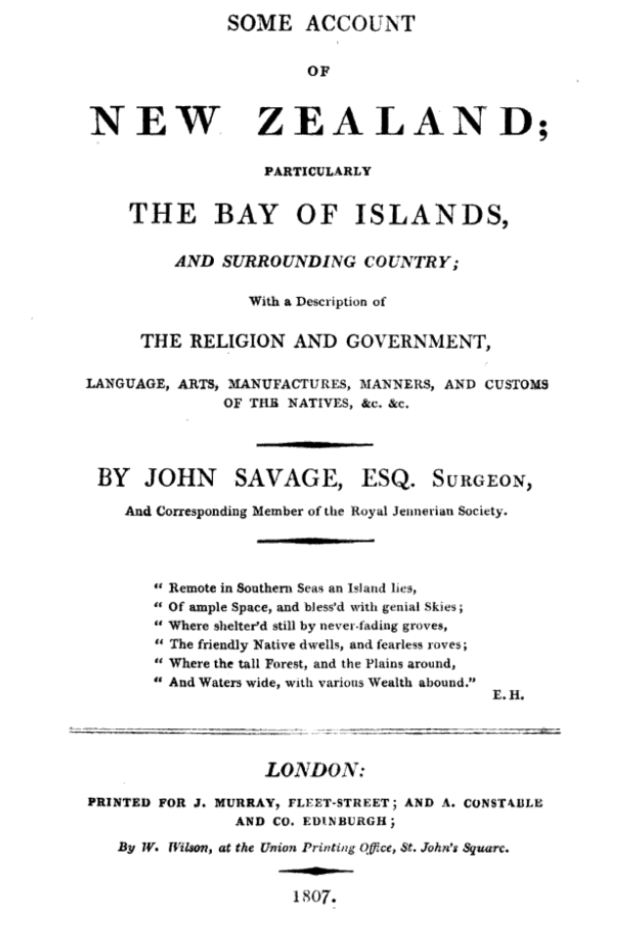
Title page of John Savage's 'Some Account of New Zealand - Particularly the Bay of Islands, and Surrounding Country.'

The account written by John Savage, who accompanied Moehanga to London, is instructive. Of Te Mahanga's departure, the following was written by John Savage:

"...I shall now add some account of his conduct upon and subsequently to his departure from his own country . Our sailing from the bay was, for several days, prevented by adverse winds, after Moyhanger and his friends had taken a formal leave of each other, during which time their visits were several times repeated. A day or two previously to our departure I had him equipped in European clothing; it was coarse, and such as is usually worn by sailors at sea...Moyhanger bore up against the last farewell with much resolution; but as our distance from the land increased, his feelings suffered exceedingly. The sun set beautifully over his native island, and his eye dwelt steadfastly upon it till darkness concealed it from further view. The recollection of scenes of youthful happiness, which he was leaving to traverse an element that affords but little of pleasure or repose, frequently brought the big tear into his eye...For several days following Moyhanger looked anxiously to the westward, the direction in which his native land had disappeared..."

HMS Ferret sailed eastward, below Cape Horn, before stopping at Saint Helena to replenish supplies. Te Mahanga was supposedly disappointed with the snow-covered peaks of Cape Horn, considering them infertile and sterile for agricultural use. Savage wrote, "They [the Māori] estimate the value of land by the quantity of potatoes it produces, and as there were no signs of cultivation here, Moyhanger was very glad to turn his back upon it..."

== Time in London ==
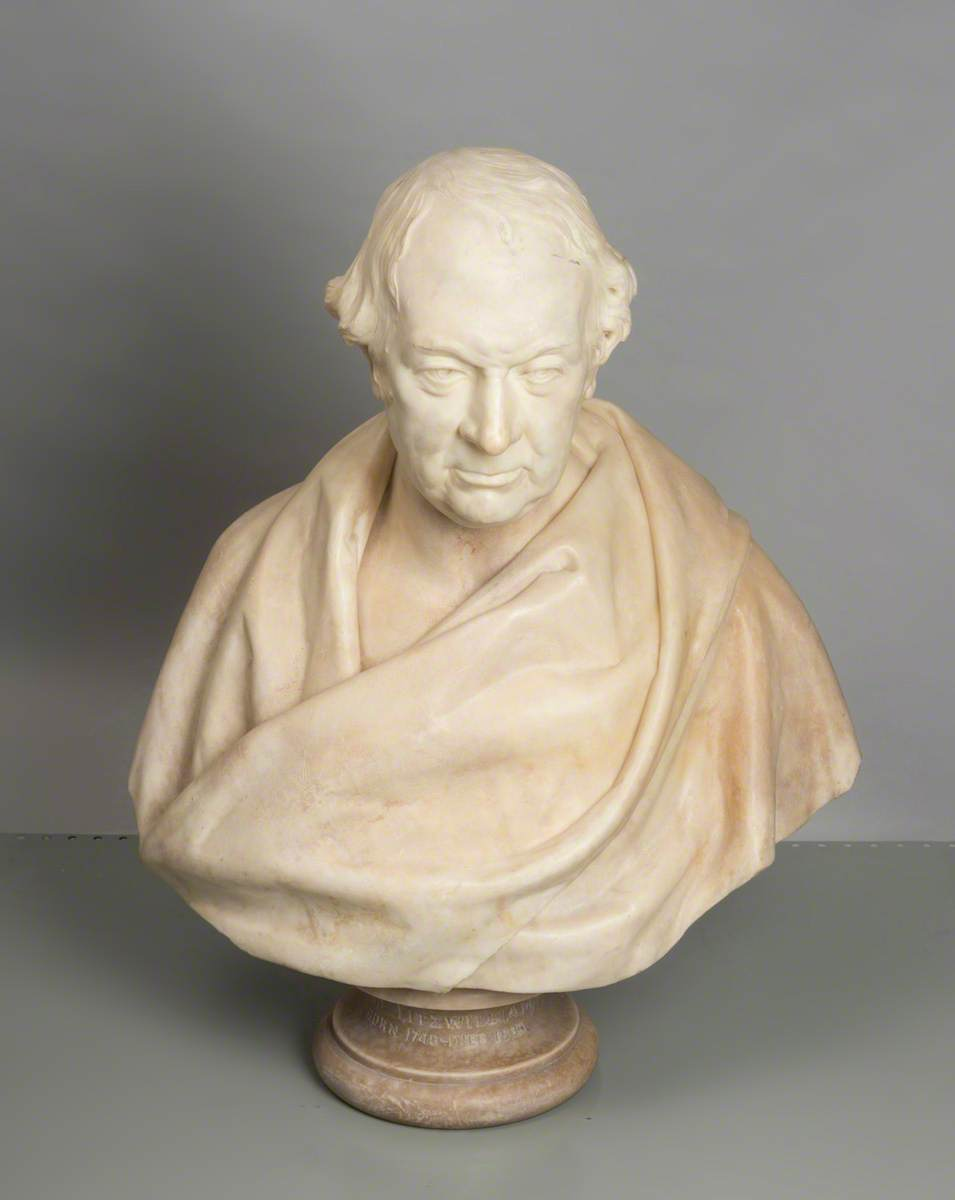
William Wentworth-Fitzwilliam (1748–1833), 4th Earl Fitzwilliam

While in London, Te Mahanga may have stayed with John Savage at Fludyer Street, a former street overtaken by the modern-day Foreign and Commonwealth Office, Whitehall, London. He was the first person to arrive in London bearing Tā moko, or facial tattoos, traditionally practiced by the Māori of New Zealand.

Te Mahanga visited the fourth Earl Fitzwilliam, William Fitzwilliam, at his Grosvenor Square residence. Also there that night was Lord Milton, the future fifth Earl Fitzwilliam. Savage wrote of the meeting between Te Mahanga and the fourth Earl Fitzwilliam, "He [Moehanga] was a great physiognomist, and approved or disliked at a first interview. The lines of his lordship's face pleased him more than those of any man of whom I had yet heard his opinion." Savage may have written in this way because the Earl Fitzwilliam was a patron.

A marble bust of William Fitzwilliam caught Te Mahanga's attention, and he is said to have contemplated its features with great admiration, promising to carve an imitation upon his return to New Zealand.

The ornamental furnishings of the Earl's Grosvenor Square residence did not impress Te Mahanga, instead he placed value on the number of chairs, observing, "A great number of men sit with the chief."

Savage wrote that it was "extremely inconvenient" to take Te Mahanga to public exhibitions, or even on the streets, on account of "John Bull's curiosity." Savage did take him to St. Paul's Cathedral, which "appeared to astonish him".

Te Mahanga did not enjoy the noise of the London streets; he regularly exclaimed Kiooda tungata, or kiooda wyeena nue une mum mum mum, which translates as 'Bad man or woman to make such a noise.' Te Mahanga was conveniently returned to New Zealand under the care of Captain Skelton, possibly cutting short his London stay. Savage wrote of his return to New Zealand,

"The ample stock of tools he took with him would render him superior, in point of riches, to any man in New Zealand; and there is not a doubt but the example of his success will induce many of his countrymen to try their fortune, whenever an opportunity for emigration may offer...he held my hand at taking leave a considerable time, during the whole of which he wept, and appeared to suffer exceedingly."

== Later life ==
Sources differ over Te Mahanga's reception upon his return to his native tribe in New Zealand.

Savage hinted throughout his account that Te Mahanga often thought of revenge on rival tribes in New Zealand. A piece from the October 1807 edition of the Eclectic Review suggested that Te Mahanga was determined - obsessed even - to seek revenge on 'Orootookee', a chief of a neighbouring tribe who had wounded him.

An account by Peter Dillon, in his 1829 Narrative and Successful Result of a Voyage in the South Seas, describes a meeting between Te Mahanga and Dillon. More than twenty years after travelling to London with John Savage, Dillon claimed Te Mahanga falsely recalled meeting King George III and Queen Charlotte, as well as their son, the then Prince Regent. Dillon also stated Te Mahanga claimed that he used money received from Queen Charlotte to hire a prostitute, whom he supposedly got pregnant. He then goes on to suppose he returned to New Zealand via India on board HMS Porpoise. Historian Vincent O'Malley has researched these claims and found no supporting evidence, noting that Te Mahanga arrived in London on 27 April, and departed on 20 June - a very brief visit - making some of his claims untenable.

== Legacy ==
On 30 April 2021, New Zealanders acknowledged Moehanga Day - or the day the Māori "discovered" Britain. Deputy Labour leader and the first Minister for Māori–Crown Relations, Kelvin Davis, said, "The day that Māori discovered England...It's got a great twist to it. I like it." He added, "This is all part of history that we should be talking about and celebrating. If it's celebrating some of our Ngāpuhi ancestors, then why not?"
