= Baron Newall =

Barony in the Peerage of the United Kingdom

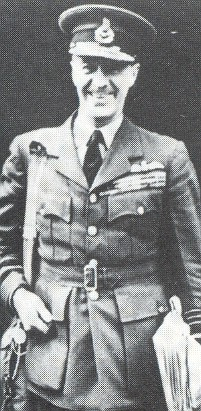
Cyril Newall, 1st Baron Newall

Baron Newall, of Clifton-upon-Dunsmoor in the County of Warwick, is a title in the Peerage of the United Kingdom. It was created on 18 July 1946 for Marshal of the Royal Air Force Sir Cyril Newall. He was Chief of the Air Staff between 1937 and 1940 and Governor-General of New Zealand between 1941 and 1946. As of 2017 the title is held by his only son, the second Baron, who succeeded in 1963.

== Barons Newall (1946) ==
- Cyril Louis Norton Newall, 1st Baron Newall (1886–1963)
- Francis Storer Eaton Newall, 2nd Baron Newall (b. 1930)

The heir apparent is the present holder's eldest son the Hon. Richard Hugh Eaton Newall (b. 1961).
The heir apparent's heir, and the next heir-in-line to the peerage, is his son William Sam Eaton Newall (b. 2011)

== Arms ==
Coat of arms of Baron Newall
Crest Issuant from an astral crown Or an eagle wings elevated Sable breathing flames Proper. Escutcheon Per pale Azure and Gules two lions passant guardant in pale Or on a chief Ermine a rose of the second between a lotus flower and a sprig of New Zealand fern all Proper. Supporters On either side a pegasus Argent gorged with an astral crown Or. Motto Deo Juvante
