= No. 41 Wing RAF =

No. 41 Wing RAF
- Country: United Kingdom
- Branch: Royal Air Force
- Size: Wing

No. 41 Wing of the Royal Flying Corps (RFC), later the Royal Air Force (RAF), was a division which conducted strategic bombing operations against Germany during the First World War.

== History ==
41 Wing was created on 11 October 1917 under the command of Lieutenant-Colonel Cyril Newall. It was based at Ochey in France. Its initial composition was:

- No. 55 Squadron flying DH.4s
- No. 100 Squadron flying F.E.2b's
- No. 16 (Naval) Squadron flying O/100s.

The wing was subsequently augmented with:

- No. 99 Squadron flying DH4s
- No. 104 Squadron flying DH4s

Preparations for bombing missions started immediately and only six days later two flights of de Havilland aircraft conducted the Flying Corps' first long-range bombing mission. The Burbach iron foundry was hit, as were other buildings and railway lines. A week later Handley Page aircraft of the 41st Wing conducted the first night-time long range operation. Bombing continued into November, until the onset of winter weather.

No. 41 Wing was officially elevated to brigade status on 28 December 1917 as the VIII Brigade of the RFC, although the VIII Brigade did not exercise practical command until 1 February 1918. The 41st Wing continued to exist as a subordinate formation of the VIII Brigade and it received a new commanding officer, Lieutenant-Colonel J E A Baldwin. Two months later on 1 April 1918, with the amalgamation of the RFC and the Royal Naval Air Service (RNAS), it became part of the RAF. Following the creation of the RAF's Independent Air Force, it came under the Independent Air Force's command on 6 June 1918. Following the end of the war it was probably transferred back to the Royal Air Force in the Field and was disbanded on 15 February 1919.

== See also ==
- List of Wings of the Royal Air Force
