= Newell Township =

Newell Township may refer to:

- Newell Township, Vermilion County, Illinois
- Newell Township, Buena Vista County, Iowa
