= Francis Newall, 2nd Baron Newall =

English peer

The Right Honourable The Lord Newall
- Born: 23 June 1930 (age 96); Surrey

Francis Storer Eaton Newall, 2nd Baron Newall DL (born 23 June 1930, in Surrey, England), is the son of Marshal of the Royal Air Force and Governor-General of New Zealand Sir Cyril Newall and his wife Olivia, and has served as a soldier, staff officer, diplomat, politician, legislator, businessman, and representative of the Crown in a variety of capacities.

== Early life and education ==
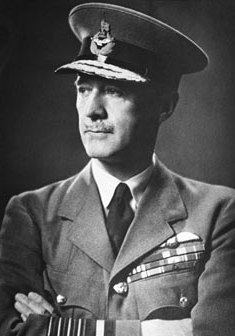
Air Chief Marshal Sir Cyril Newall

Newall resided in his family's Surrey home before leaving for Cairo upon his father's appointment as Air Officer Commanding Middle East. There he remained for four years, returning again to Surrey from 1935 to 1941, at which point he and his family were moved to New Zealand following Sir Cyril's appointment as Governor-General. Unlike the rest of his family, he only remained two years: in 1943, having matriculated at Eton, he returned home, residing there and with strangers and friends of his parents from then until the end of his father's term of office after the end of the war, in 1946.

== Military service ==
Newall remained at Eton until 1948, when he volunteered for Army service and was accepted to the Royal Military Academy Sandhurst. He remained there until successfully completing the course in the middle of 1950, at which point (following further gunnery training) he joined the 11th Hussars, then stationed with the British Army of the Rhine in Osnabrück, Germany. He served there and at Wesendorf for three years, commanding an armoured cavalry troop and being promoted Lieutenant in 1952 before the 11th was transferred to British Malaya (now Singapore and peninsular Malaysia) in 1953 to combat the increasingly powerful Communist insurgency there (see Malayan Emergency). During his service there, he served in a variety of roles, including intelligence, domestic pacification, and aide-de-camp to General Sir Charles Loewen, Commander-in-Chief Far East Land Forces. In 1956 he was promoted Captain and returned to Britain as adjutant to the Royal Gloucestershire Hussars, and served in a variety of roles thereafter until his 1961 retirement following contraction of jaundice in Omagh, Northern Ireland.

== Business career ==
At this point, Newall entered the business world. He joined Arthur Guinness & Son and subsequently helped found Harp Lager. During this time he acceded to the peerage following his father's death in 1963, assuming his seat in the House of Lords as the Lord Newall. He remained with Guinness until 1966, taking a position as public relations spokesmen for Schweppes USA, Ltd, during which time he took a home in Connecticut. He returned to the UK in 1972 as managing director for Neilson McCarthy Public Relations, a position he held until 1975. He has continued to be involved in business since, and presently serves as Chairman of Code Circus Ltd, a web application development company.

At this time Lord Newall began to engage seriously in politics. He took his seat as a Conservative member of the Lords shortly following the return to power of Labour Prime Minister Harold Wilson, and served as an opposition spokesman and whip from 1976, his tenure ending upon the victory and accession to power of Margaret Thatcher. He continued dual involvement in both business and politics through 1983, at which time he entered continental politics as a delegate to the Council of Europe and Western European Union. He continued sitting in the Lords, holding his seat for a total of thirty-seven years and introducing six private members’ bills — four of which were passed – as well as making hundreds of speeches. Since losing his seat on the expulsion of the hereditary peers in the House of Lords Act 1999 he has become Co-Chairman of the Hereditary Peerage Association. He has also acted as a representative of the British parliament and the WEU on several occasions: notably, during annual visits from 1986 through 1993 to Romania, which included private meetings with President Nicolae Ceauşescu and members of his government; and, more recently, in Azerbaijan.

Lord Newall also takes active interests in both sports and charity work. He served for twelve years as chairman of the British Greyhound Racing Board and president of the World Greyhound Racing Association. He has been president of SPANA (Society for the Protection of Animals Abroad), chairman of the Lord Barnby Charitable Association and of the British Moroccan Society, and a committee member for the Not Forgotten Association, which works to provide services for disabled British servicepeople. He is also honorary president of the Committee for Release of Tindouf Prisoners, which campaigns for the release of a great many of the longest-held prisoners in the world who are held in dreadful conditions in a concentration camp in Algeria.

== Family ==
Lord Newall has three children – daughter Miranda and sons Richard and David – nine grandchildren and seven great-grandchildren with his wife Panna; they have been married since c. 1957. The garden of his home in Buckinghamshire, where he has resided since c. 1975, is open to the public.

== Arms ==
Coat of arms of Francis Newall, 2nd Baron Newall
Crest Issuant from an astral crown Or an eagle wings elevated Sable breathing flames Proper. Escutcheon Per pale Azure and Gules two lions passant guardant in pale Or on a chief Ermine a rose of the second between a lotus flower and a sprig of New Zealand fern all Proper. Supporters On either side a pegasus Argent gorged with an astral crown Or. Motto Deo Juvante

Peerage of the United Kingdom
Preceded by Cyril Newall	Baron Newall; 1963–present	Incumbent; Heir apparent: Hon. Richard Newall
