= Royal Visits Committee =

Committee of the Cabinet Office

The Royal Visits Committee (also known as the RVC) is a committee of the Cabinet Office of the Government of the United Kingdom. The committee determines the programme of overseas visits (including Commonwealth realm visits) for the Sovereign and British royal family. It is chaired by the Permanent Undersecretary of the Foreign, Commonwealth and Development Office.

Most of these visits are paid for by the Sovereign Grant, except for visits to Commonwealth realms.

== Composition ==
The committee consists of

- Permanent Undersecretary of the Foreign, Commonwealth and Development Office; (Chair)
- Representatives of each Royal Household;
- Representatives of 10 Downing Street, the Cabinet Office, the Department for Business and Trade
