= Lawrence Newell =

Papua New Guinean lawyer and missionary

Lawrence Michael Newell CBE (born England) was a prominent Papua New Guinean lawyer, and Chancellor of the Anglican Church of Papua New Guinea.

A member of various government committees on law-related subjects, he also served as the Registrar of the Supreme and National Court of Papua New Guinea.

Prior to working in Papua New Guinea, Newell worked as a missionary in Rwanda, Africa. He was awarded with a CBE for his work in Administration of Courts and Law in the Papua New Guinea and the South Pacific.

Lawrence Newell was born in England and is the elder son of Ronald and Margaret Newell and brother of Australian businessman and politician Martin John Newell.
