= Newel (disambiguation) =

A Newel is the upright post about which the steps of a circular staircase wind.

Newel may also refer to:

- Newel, Germany

== People ==
- Stanford Newel (1839–1907), American attorney and diplomat
- Newel K. Whitney (1795-1850), American convert to Mormonism
- Newel Knight (1800-1847), American convert to Mormonism

== See also ==
- Newell (disambiguation)
