= Cyril Newall, 1st Baron Newall =

Senior Royal Air Force officer (1886–1963)

Marshal of the Royal Air Force The Right Honourable The Lord Newall GCB OM GCMG CBE KStJ AM
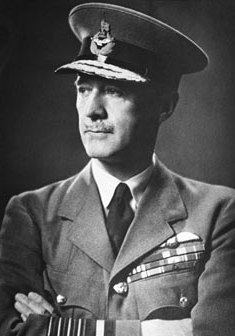
- Marshal of the RAF Sir Cyril Newall c. 1940

6th Governor-General of New Zealand
- In office 22 February 1941 – 19 April 1946
- Monarch: George VI
- Prime Minister: Peter Fraser
- Preceded by: The Viscount Galway
- Succeeded by: The Lord Freyberg

Personal details
- Born: Cyril Louis Norton Newall; 15 February 1886 Mussoorie, Indian Empire
- Died: 30 November 1963 (aged 77) London, England

Military service
- Allegiance: United Kingdom
- Branch/service: British Army (1905–18); Royal Air Force (1918–40)
- Years of service: 1905–40
- Rank: Marshal of the Royal Air Force
- Commands: Chief of the Air Staff (1937–40); Air Member for Supply and Organisation (1935–37); Middle East Command (1931–34); Wessex Bombing Area (1931); VIII Brigade RAF (1917–18); 41st Wing RFC (1917); 9th Wing RFC (1916–17); 6th Wing RFC (1916); No. 12 Squadron RFC (1915–16)
- Battles/wars: North West Frontier; First World War; Second World War
- Awards: Knight Grand Cross of the Order of the Bath; Member of the Order of Merit; Knight Grand Cross of the Order of St Michael and St George; Commander of the Order of the British Empire; Albert Medal; Mentioned in Despatches (3); Officer of the Legion of Honour (France); Officer of the Order of the Crown of Italy; Officer of the Order of Leopold (Belgium); Croix de guerre (Belgium)

Marshal of the Royal Air Force Cyril Louis Norton Newall, 1st Baron Newall, GCB, OM, GCMG, CBE, KStJ, AM (15 February 1886 – 30 November 1963) was a senior officer of the British Army and Royal Air Force. He commanded units of the Royal Flying Corps and Royal Air Force in the First World War, and served as Chief of the Air Staff during the first years of the Second World War. From 1941 to 1946 he was the Governor-General of New Zealand.

Born to a military family, Newall studied at the Royal Military College, Sandhurst, before taking a commission as a junior officer in the Royal Warwickshire Regiment in 1905. After transferring to the 2nd Gurkha Rifles in the Indian Army, he saw active service on the North West Frontier, but after learning to fly in 1911 turned towards a career in military aviation. During the First World War he rose from flying instructor to command of 41st Wing RFC, the main strategic bombing force, and was awarded the Albert Medal for putting out a fire in an explosives store.

He served in staff positions through the 1920s and was Air Officer Commanding the Middle East Command in the early 1930s before becoming Air Member for Supply and Organisation in 1935. Newall was appointed Chief of the Air Staff in 1937 and, in that role, supported sharp increases in aircraft production, increasing expenditure on the new, heavily armed, Hurricane and Spitfire fighters, essential to re-equip Fighter Command. He was sacked after the Battle of Britain after political intrigue caused him to lose Churchill's confidence. In 1941 he was appointed Governor-General of New Zealand, holding office until 1946.

== Early life ==
Newall was born to Lieutenant Colonel William Potter Newall and Edith Gwendoline Caroline Newall (née Norton). After education at Bedford School, he attended the Royal Military College, Sandhurst. After leaving Sandhurst, he was commissioned into the Royal Warwickshire Regiment on 16 August 1905. He was promoted to lieutenant on 18 November 1908, and transferred to the 2nd King Edward VII's Own Gurkha Rifles on 16 September 1909. He served on the North-West Frontier, where he first encountered his future colleague Hugh Dowding; at an exercise in 1909, Dowding's artillery section ambushed Newall's Gurkhas whilst they were still breakfasting.

Newall began to turn towards a career in aviation in 1911, when he learned to fly in a Bristol Biplane at Larkhill whilst on leave in England. He held certificate No. 144 issued by the Royal Aero Club. He later passed a formal course at the Central Flying School, Upavon in 1913, and began working as a pilot trainer there from 17 November 1913; it was intended that he would form part of a flight training school to be established in India, but he had not yet left England when the First World War broke out.

== First World War ==
On the outbreak of war, Newall was in England. On 12 September 1914, he was given the temporary rank of captain, and attached to the Royal Flying Corps as a flight commander, to serve with No. 1 Squadron on the Western Front. He was promoted to the permanent rank of captain on 22 September, effective from 16 August. On 24 March 1915 he was promoted to major and appointed to command No. 12 Squadron, flying BE2c aircraft in France from September onwards. The squadron took part in the Battle of Loos, bombing railways and carrying out reconnaissance missions in October 1915.

On taking command of the squadron, he chose to stop flying personally in order to concentrate on administration, a decision which was regarded dismissively by his men; relations were strained until January 1916, when he demonstrated his courage by walking into a burning bomb store to try to control a fire. He was awarded the Albert Medal for this act on the personal recommendation of General Hugh Trenchard, and in February 1916 was promoted to lieutenant colonel and given command of Training No. 6 Wing in England. In December 1916 he took command of No. 9 Wing in France, a long-range bomber and reconnaissance formation, and in October 1917 took command of the newly formed No. 41 Wing. This was upgraded as the 8th Brigade in December, with Newall promoted accordingly to the temporary rank of brigadier-general on 28 December 1917. During 1918, it joined the Independent Bombing Force, which was the main strategic bombing arm of the newly formed Royal Air Force. In June 1918 Newall was appointed the Deputy Commander of the Independent Bombing Force, serving under Trenchard.

Newall was awarded the Croix d'Officier of the French Legion of Honour on 10 October 1918, and appointed a Companion of the Order of St Michael and St George on 1 January 1919, a Commander of the Order of the British Empire on 3 June 1919 and an Officer of the Belgian Order of Leopold on 18 April 1921.

On the 3rd January, 1916, at about 3 pm, a fire broke out inside a large bomb store belonging to the Royal Flying Corps, which contained nearly 2,000 high explosive bombs, some of which had very large charges, and a number of incendiary bombs which were burning freely. Major Newall at once took all necessary precautions, and then, assisted by Air Mechanic Simms, poured water into the shed through a hole made by the flames. He sent for the key of the store, and with Corporal Hearne, Harwood and Simms entered the building and succeeded in putting out the flames. The wooden cases containing the bombs were burnt, and some of them were charred to a cinder.

— – Citation for the Albert Medal, published in the London Gazette.

== Between the wars ==
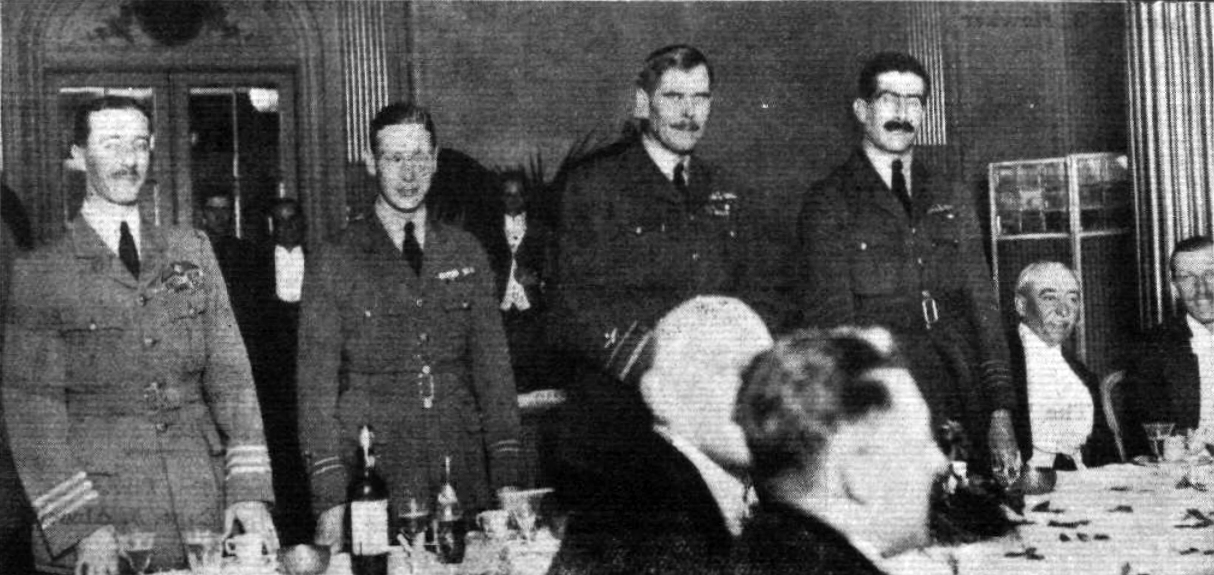
Newall (far left) at a dinner in honour of the Independent Air Force, 1919. He is standing next to Prince Albert, the future George VI. Further right are Hugh Trenchard and Christopher Courtney.

Newall was granted a permanent commission in the Royal Air Force as a lieutenant colonel on 1 August 1919 and promoted to group captain on 8 August 1919. He became deputy director of Personnel at the Air Ministry in August 1919 and then Deputy Commandant of the apprentices' technical training school in August 1922. He married Mary Weddell in 1922; she died in September 1924, and he remarried the following year to Olive Foster, an American woman. He had three children with Foster, a son and two daughters.

Newall was promoted to air commodore on 1 January 1925, and took command of the newly formed Auxiliary Air Force in May 1925. He was appointed to a League of Nations disarmament committee in December 1925 and then became Deputy Chief of the Air Staff and Director of Operations and Intelligence on 12 April 1926. He was appointed a Companion of the Order of the Bath in the 1929 Birthday Honours and, having been promoted to air vice marshal on 1 January 1930, he stood down as Deputy Chief on 6 February 1931. He became Air Officer Commanding Wessex Bombing Area in February 1931 and then Air Officer Commanding Middle East Command in September 1931. He then returned to the Air Ministry, where he became Air Member for Supply and Organisation on 14 January 1935, during the beginnings of the pre-war expansion and rearmament. He was advanced to Knight Commander of the Order of the Bath in the 1935 Birthday Honours and promoted to air marshal on 1 July 1935. He attended the funeral of King George V in January 1936.

Philosophically, Newall remained a close follower of Trenchard during the interwar period; his time in the Independent Bombing Force had left him convinced that strategic bombing was an exceptionally powerful weapon, and one that could not effectively be defended against. In this, he was a supporter of the standard doctrine of the day, which suggested that the destructive power of a bomber force was sufficiently great that it could cripple an industrial economy in short order, and that so merely its presence could potentially serve as an effective deterrent. He was promoted to air chief marshal on 1 April 1937.

== Chief of the Air Staff ==
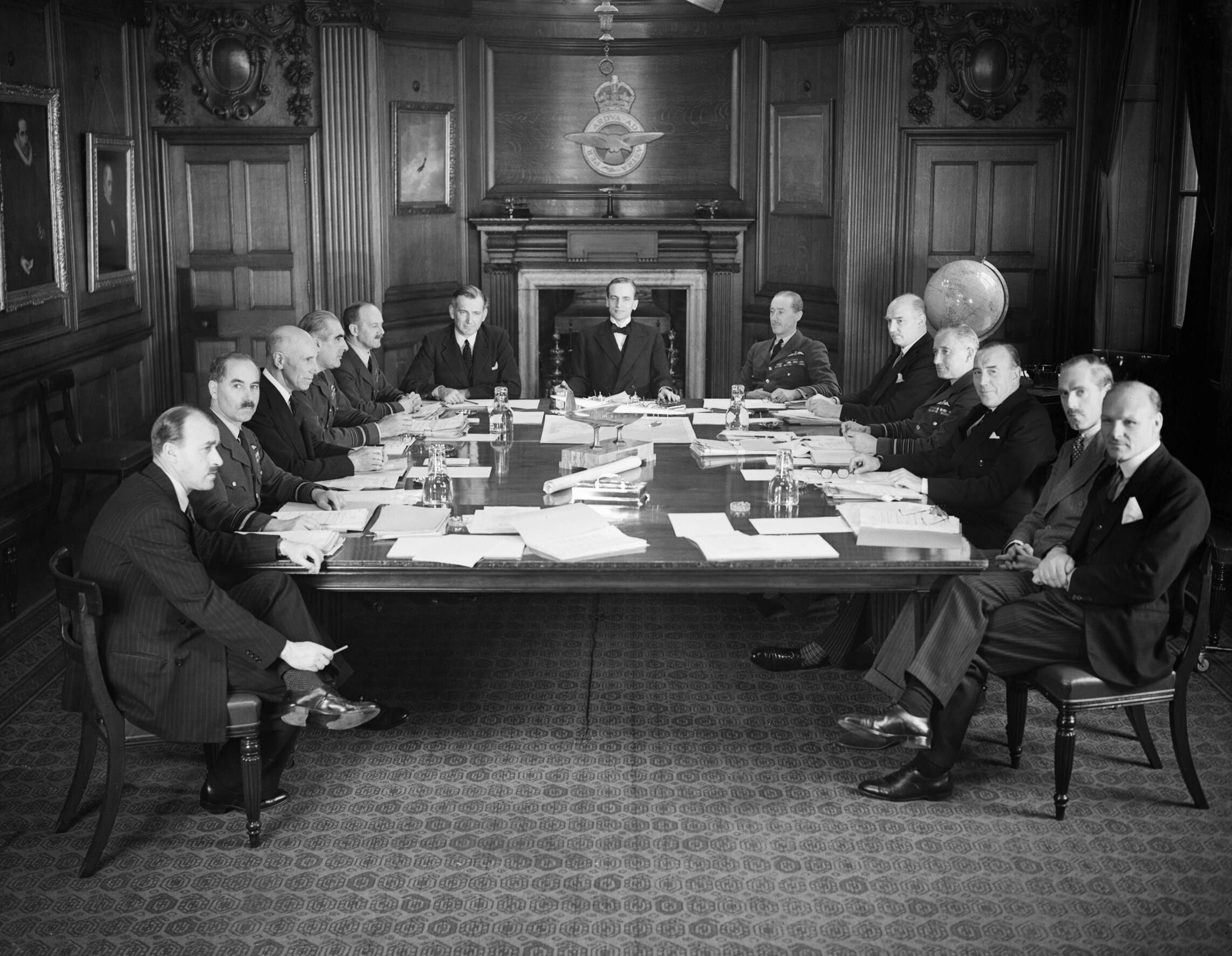
The Air Council meeting in mid-1940; Newall is at the far end of the table, next to Sir Archibald Sinclair.

On 1 September 1937, Newall was appointed as Chief of the Air Staff, the military head of the RAF, in succession to Sir Edward Ellington. The promotion was unexpected; of the prospective candidates mooted for the job, Newall has been widely seen by historians as the least gifted. The most prominent candidate was Hugh Dowding, the head of RAF Fighter Command and senior in rank to Newall by three months, who had been informally told by Ellington in 1936 that he was expected to be appointed as the new Chief of the Air Staff. The decision was taken by the Air Minister, Viscount Swinton, without consulting Ellington for advice.

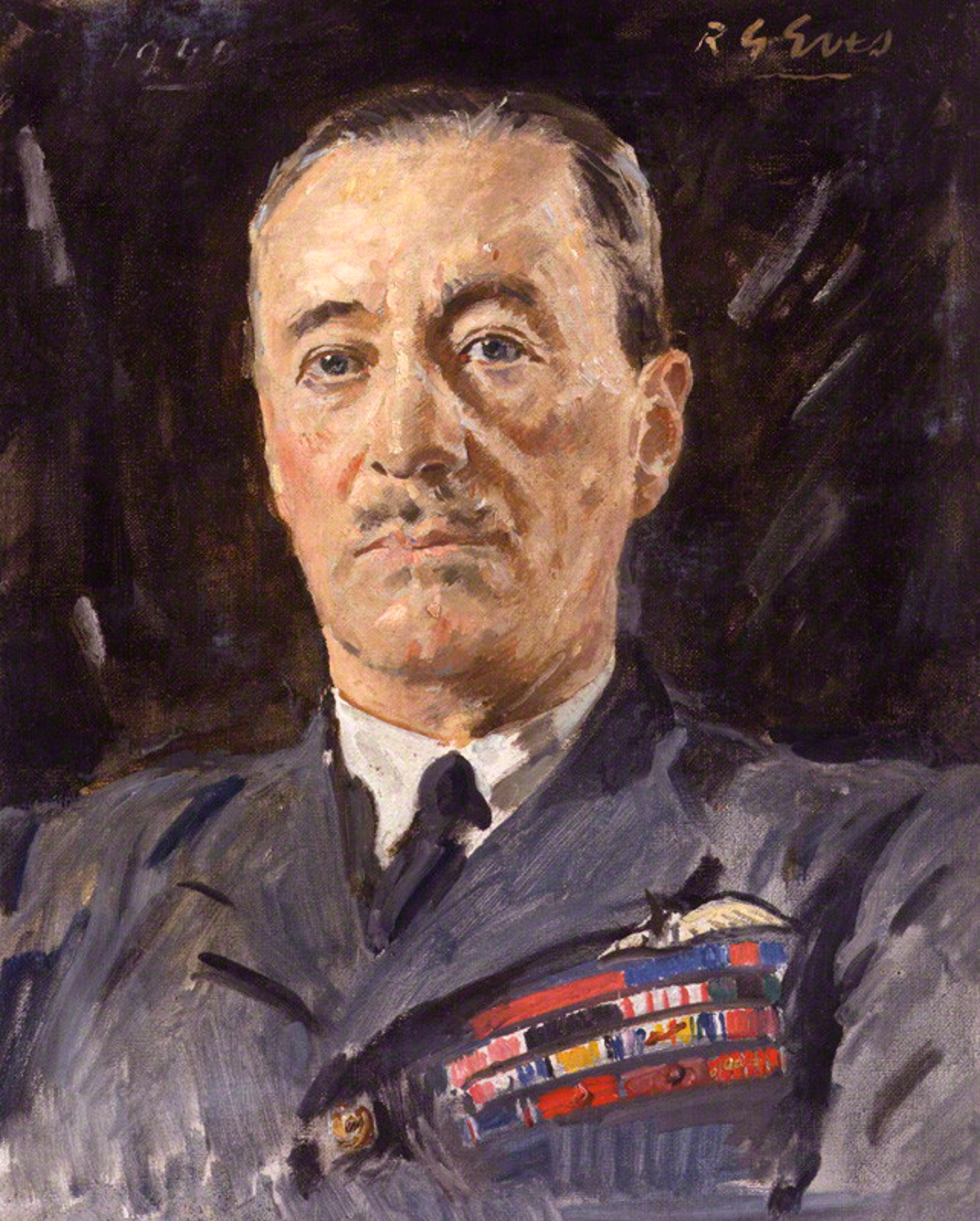
A 1940 portrait of Newall by Reginald Grenville Eves.

During 1936 and 1937, the Air Staff had been fighting with the Cabinet over the rearmament plans; the Air Staff wanted a substantial bomber force and only minor increases in fighters, whilst the Minister for Defence Co-ordination, Thomas Inskip, successfully pushed for a greater role for the fighter force. Newall was promoted during the middle of this debate, and proved perhaps more flexible than might have been expected. In 1938 he supported sharp increases in aircraft production, including double-shift working and duplication of factories, and pushed for the creation of a dedicated organisation to repair and refit damaged aircraft. He supported expenditure on the new, heavily armed, Hurricane and Spitfire fighters, essential to re-equip Fighter Command. He even began to distance himself, albeit slightly, from orthodox bomber philosophy, noting to the Minister for Air that "no one can say with absolute certainty that a nation can be knocked out from the air, because no-one has yet attempted it". Discussing plans for reacting to a war with Italy, in early 1939, he opposed a French proposal to force Italy's surrender by the use of heavy bombing raids against the north, arguing that it would be unlikely to force the country out of the war without the need for ground combat.

Newall was advanced to Knight Grand Cross of the Order of the Bath in the 1938 Birthday Honours. He was still Chief of the Air Staff at the outbreak of the Second World War on 1 September 1939; his main contribution to the war effort was his successful resistance to the transfer of fighter squadrons to aid the collapsing French thus preserving a large portion of Fighter Command which would become crucial during the Battle of Britain. While he remained committed to the idea of a "knock-out blow" offensive by Bomber Command, he also recognised that it was too weak to do so successfully, but still strongly opposed the use of the RAF for close air support.

Following the end of the Battle of Britain, Newall was quickly forced into retirement and replaced as Chief of the Air Staff by Charles Portal. Contemporaries attributed this to the effects of overwork, which had certainly taken its toll, but there were also other aspects; Newall had lost political support, particularly following a dispute with Lord Beaverbrook over the control of aircraft production and repair. Matters came to a head with the circulation of an anonymous memo attacking Newall, among other senior officers, as "a real weakness to the RAF and to the nation's defences". The author was Air Commodore Edgar McCloughry, a disaffected staff officer who saw himself as passed over for promotion and who had been brought into Beaverbrook's inner circle. Beaverbrook pressed Churchill to dismiss Newall, gaining the support of influential ex-RAF figures such as Trenchard and Salmond. Trenchard had come out against Newall for his failure to launch a decisive strategic bombing offensive, while Salmond saw Newall's removal as the simplest way to replace Dowding as head of Fighter Command – despite Newall having also sought to sack Dowding.

He was promoted to Marshal of the Royal Air Force on 4 October 1940 and retired from the RAF later that month. He was awarded the Order of Merit on 29 October, and made a Knight Grand Cross of the Order of St Michael and St George on 21 November.

== New Zealand and later life ==
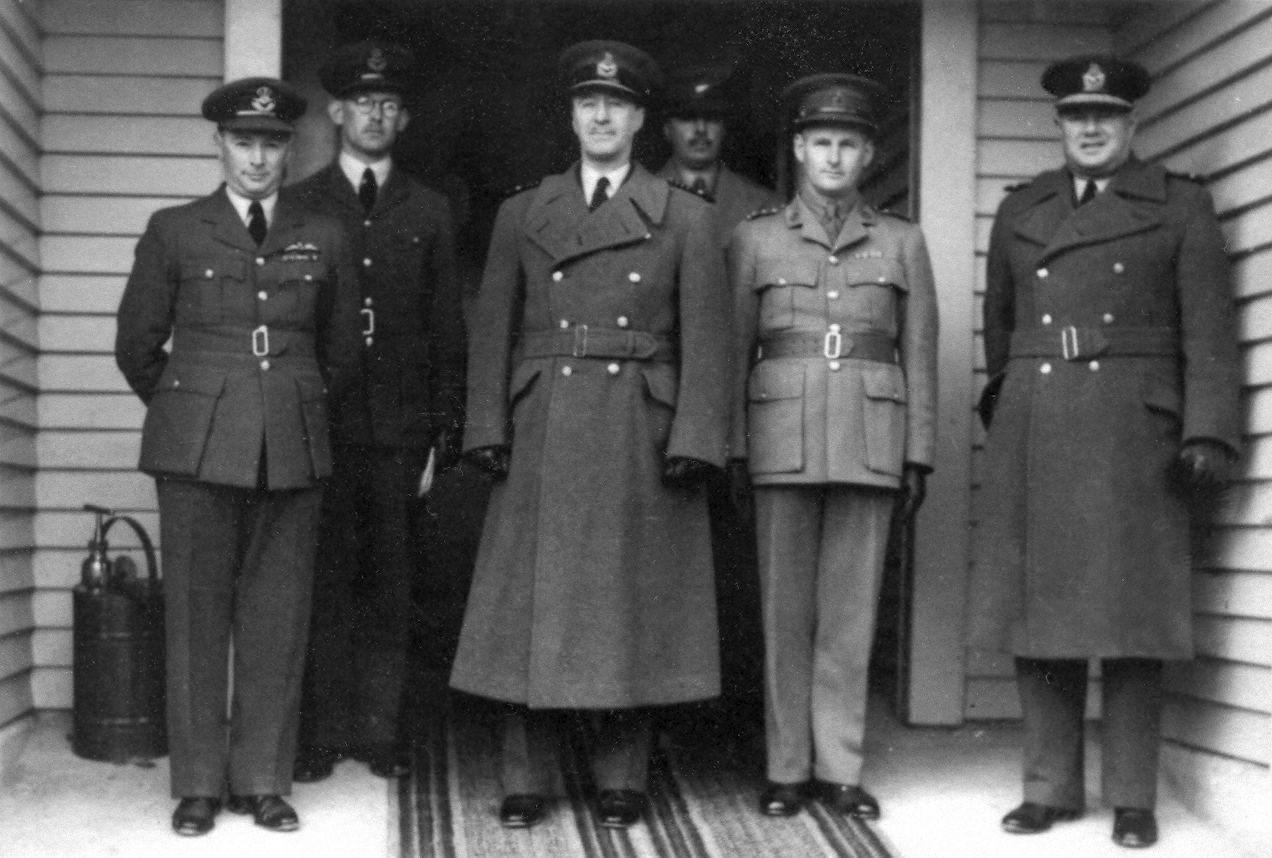
Newall (shown centre) as Governor-General of New Zealand.

In February 1941 Newall was appointed Governor-General of New Zealand, a post he would hold for the remainder of the war. His time there was mostly quiet – described by one biographer as "a nice long rest" – and he toured the country extensively, referring to the war "in every public address". Newall and his wife, who also carried out an extensive program of engagements, were broadly popular, but there were occasional tensions; shortly after his arrival, it was widely (but mistakenly) rumoured that he had slighted the "men" of the Army in favour of the "gentlemen" of the RNZAF in a speech. A Freemason, Newall became Grand Master of New Zealand's Grand Lodge while Governor-General.

Politically, he had a lukewarm relationship with the Prime Minister, Peter Fraser – "I can't persuade myself that he is all he quite appears to be", Newall noted in a private report – but the two worked together effectively. Small problems occasionally flared up, such as that in October 1942, when Fraser was reprimanded for not personally informing Newall of the resignation of four ministers. However, only one developed into a direct confrontation, when Newall became the last Governor-General to refuse to follow the advice of his cabinet. Newall was presented with a government recommendation to remit four prisoners sentenced to be flogged, but refused to do so. He argued that if the government was opposed to flogging, it should repeal the legislation rather than maintain a policy of always remitting the sentences. This would be constitutionally improper, as it meant that the executive was overriding the legislature, which had provided for the sentence, and the judiciary, which had given it. Fraser, and his deputy Walter Nash, refused to accept this response, and the impasse stretched out for several days; in the end, a compromise was reached where Newall remitted the sentences but the government undertook to repeal the legislation. The repeal bill was then extended to cover capital punishment as well; the government had the same policy to always remit, and it was felt that both had to be handled in the same way.

A second conflict emerged just before the end of his term, when in 1945, the Labour government sought to abolish the country quota, a system that gave additional electoral seats in rural areas. Farming groups – predominantly National-supporting – strongly opposed the move, and argued that such a major change could only be made after gaining approval in a general election. Newall sympathised, and advised Fraser to wait until after the election, but did not feel it was appropriate to intervene; he assented to the bill.

Following his return from New Zealand in 1946, Newall was raised to the peerage as Baron Newall, of Clifton upon Dunsmoor, in the county of Warwick. He spoke in the House of Lords rarely, making five speeches between 1946 and 1948 and one in 1959, mostly addressing defence issues. Newall died at his home at Welbeck Street in London on 30 November 1963, at which time his son Francis inherited his title.

Newall is buried with his wife Olive at St Mary Magdalene in Tormarton, South Gloucestershire.

== Arms ==
Coat of arms of Cyril Newall, 1st Baron Newall
Notes The arms of Cyril Newall, 1st Baron Newall consist of: (Carved depiction) Crest Issuant from an Astral Crown Or an eagle wings elevated Sable breathing flames proper. Escutcheon Per Pale Azure and Gules two lions Passant Guardant in Pale Or on a chief Ermine a rose of the second barbed and seeded between a lotus flower and a sprig of New Zealand fern all Proper. Supporters On either side a pegasus Argent gorged with an astral crown Or. Motto Deo Juvante (With God's help)

== Sources ==
- Allen, H. R. (1976). Who won the Battle of Britain?. Panther. ISBN 0-586-04281-4.
- McLean, Gavin (2006). The governors : New Zealand's governors and governors-general. Dunedin: Otago University Press. ISBN 1-877372-25-0.
- Probert, Henry (1991). High Commanders of the Royal Air Force. HMSO. ISBN 0-11-772635-4.
- Quentin-Baxter, R. Q. (1979). "The Governor-General's Constitutional Discretions: An Essay towards a Re-Definition". Victoria University of Wellington Law Review. 10: 289.
- Salerno, Reynolds M. (February 1997). "The French Navy and the Appeasement of Italy, 1937-9". The English Historical Review. 112 (445): 66–104. doi:10.1093/ehr/cxii.445.66. JSTOR 578508.
- Ritchie, Sebastian (1998). "A Political Intrigue Against the Chief of the Air Staff: The Downfall of Air Chief Marshal Sir Cyril Newall". War & Society. 16 (1): 83–104. doi:10.1179/072924798791201174.
- Wright, Robert (1970). Dowding and the Battle of Britain. Corgi. ISBN 0-552-08511-1.

Military offices
New title Wing established	Officer Commanding 41st Wing RFC; October–December 1917	Succeeded by Jack Baldwin
New title Brigade established	Brigadier General Commanding VIII Brigade RFC; January - June 1918	Unknown
Preceded by Henry Smyth-Osbourne	Deputy Director of Personnel; 1919–1922	Succeeded by Andrew Board
Preceded by John Miles Steel	Deputy Chief of the Air Staff and Director of Operations and Intelligence; 1926–1931	Succeeded by Charles Burnett
Preceded by John Miles Steel	Air Officer Commanding Wessex Bombing Area; 1931	Succeeded by Sir Tom Webb-Bowen
Preceded by Francis Scarlett	Air Officer Commanding Middle East Command; 1931–1934	Succeeded by Cuthbert MacLean
Preceded by Hugh Dowding; As Air Member for Supply and Research	Air Member for Supply and Organisation; 1935–1937	Succeeded by William Welsh
Preceded by Sir Edward Ellington	Chief of the Air Staff; 1937–1940	Succeeded by Sir Charles Portal
Awards and achievements
Preceded by Kaufman T. Keller	Cover of Time magazine 23 October 1939	Succeeded by King Gustav V
Government offices
Preceded by The Viscount Galway	Governor-General of New Zealand; 1941–1946	Succeeded by The Lord Freyberg
Peerage of the United Kingdom
New creation	Baron Newall; 1946–1963	Succeeded by Francis Newall
