= Trenchard (disambiguation) =

Hugh Trenchard, 1st Viscount Trenchard (1873–1956) was a British officer who was instrumental in establishing the Royal Air Force.

Trenchard may also refer to:

== People ==
- Edward Trenchard, American naval officer
- George Trenchard (multiple people)
- Henry Trenchard (MP for Poole), English politician
- Hugh Trenchard, 3rd Viscount Trenchard (born 1951), British soldier and businessman
- John Trenchard (politician) (1649–1695), English politician
- John Trenchard (writer), English political essayist
- Stephen Decatur Trenchard, American rear admiral
- Thomas Trenchard (multiple people)
  - Thomas Trenchard, American football coach
  - Thomas Trenchard (Dorset MP)
  - Thomas Trenchard (died 1671)
  - Thomas Trenchard, 2nd Viscount Trenchard (1923–1987)

== Other uses ==
- Viscount Trenchard, a title in the Peerage of the United Kingdom
- Colonel Trenchard, a character in the Doctor Who serial The Sea Devils

== See also ==
- Brian Trenchard-Smith (born 1946), English director, producer, writer, and actor
