= List of titles and honours of Hugh Trenchard, 1st Viscount Trenchard =

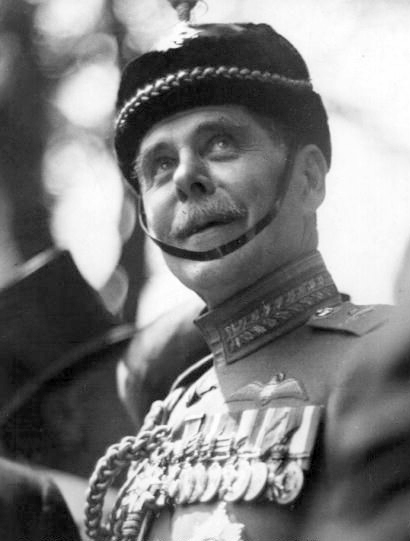
Air Marshal Trenchard with medals

Hugh Trenchard, 1st Viscount Trenchard received numerous titles, decorations, and honours both during and after his military career.

== Ranks ==
Trenchard held the following ranks:

- 31 March 1891, 2nd Lieutenant, Forfar and Kincardine Artillery (Militia)
- 9 September 1893, 2nd Lieutenant, Royal Scots Fusiliers
- 12 August 1896, Lieutenant, Royal Scots Fusiliers
- 28 February 1900, Captain, Royal Scots Fusiliers
- 22 August 1902, Brevet Major
- 1 June 1908, Temporary Lieutenant Colonel
- 4 November 1910, Brevet Major
- 7 August 1914, Temporary Lieutenant Colonel
- 18 January 1915, Brevet Lieutenant Colonel
- 3 June 1915, Brevet Colonel
- 25 August 1915, Temporary Brigadier General
- 24 March 1916, Temporary Major-General
- 1 January 1917, Major-General
- 3 January 1918, Major-General, Royal Air Force
- 1 August 1919, Air Vice-Marshal, Royal Air Force
- 11 August 1919, Air Marshal, Royal Air Force
- 1 April 1922, Air Chief Marshal, Royal Air Force
- 1 January 1927, Marshal of the Royal Air Force

== Mentions in Despatches ==
- 25 August 1905 (by F D Lugard, High Commissioner of the Northern Nigeria Protectorate)
- 18 September 1906 (by Lieutenant-Colonel H C Moorhouse, Officer Commanding Southern Nigeria Regiment)
- 31 May 1915 (by Field Marshal Sir John French, Commander-in-Chief British Armies in the Field)
- 1 November 1915 (by Field Marshal Sir John French, Commander-in-Chief, The British Army in France)
- 1 January 1916 (by Field Marshal Sir John French, Commander-in-Chief, The British Army in France)
- 15 June 1916
- 4 January 1917
- 11 December 1917
- 20 May 1918
- 10 April 1919

== Orders of chivalry and decorations ==
- 18 September 1906, Companion of the Distinguished Service Order
- 1 January 1914, Companion of the Most Honourable Order of the Bath
- 1 January 1918, Knight Commander of the Most Honourable Order of the Bath
- 1 January 1924, Knight Grand Cross of the Most Honourable Order of the Bath
- 20 July 1935, Knight Grand Cross of the Royal Victorian Order
- 1 January 1951, Member of the Order of Merit

== Titles of nobility ==
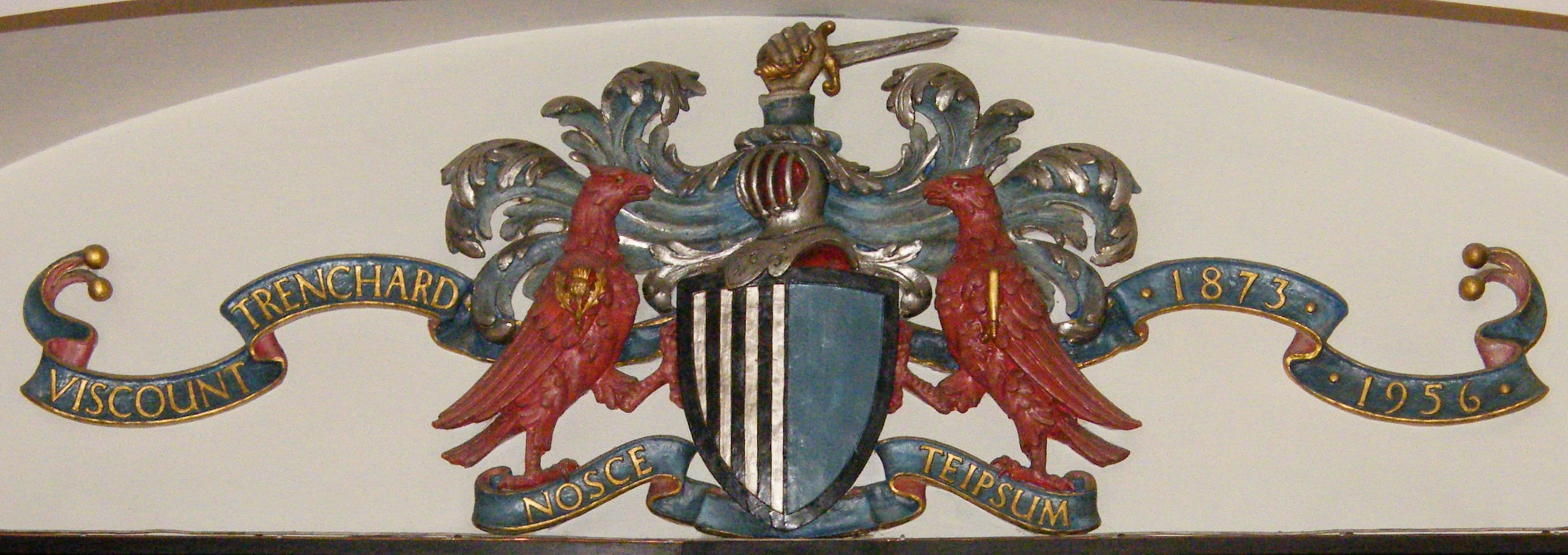
Lord Trenchard's armorial achievement as displayed in St. Clement Danes

- 30 December 1919, Baronet
- 27 January 1930, Baron Trenchard, of Wolfeton in the County of Dorset
- 4 February 1936, Viscount Trenchard, of Wolfeton in the County of Dorset

== Medals ==
- Queen's South Africa Medal with Transvaal, Orange Free State and Cape Colony clasps
- King's South Africa Medal with South Africa 1901 and South Africa 1902 clasps
- Africa General Service Medal with North Nigeria 1904, Southern Nigeria 1904–05 and Southern Nigeria 1905–06 clasps
- 1914 Star with 5 August – 22 November 1914 clasp
- War Medal
- Victory Medal with MiD oakleaf
- King George V Silver Jubilee Medal
- King George VI Coronation Medal
- Queen Elizabeth II Coronation Medal
- Croix de Guerre (Belgium)
- Distinguished Service Medal (U.S. Army)

== Styles ==
3 February 1873 – 28 February 1900:	Hugh Montague Trenchard
28 February 1900 – 22 August 1902:	Captain Hugh Montague Trenchard
22 August 1902 – 18 September 1906:	Captain (Brevet Major) Hugh Montague Trenchard
18 September 1906 – 1 June 1908:	Captain (Brevet Major) Hugh Montague Trenchard, DSO
1 June 1908 – 4 November 1910:	Captain (Temp. Lieutenant-Colonel) Hugh Montague Trenchard, DSO
4 November 1910 – 1 January 1914:	Captain (Temp. Lieutenant-Colonel) Hugh Montague Trenchard, DSO
1 January – 7 August 1914:	Captain (Temp. Lieutenant-Colonel) Hugh Montague Trenchard, CB, DSO
7 August 1914 – 18 January 1915:	Captain (Brevet Major) Hugh Montague Trenchard, CB, DSO
18 January – 23 June 1915:	Captain (Brevet Lieutenant-Colonel) Hugh Montague Trenchard, CB, DSO
3 June – 25 August 1915:	Captain (Brevet Colonel) Hugh Montague Trenchard, CB, DSO
25 August 1915 – 24 March 1916:	Captain (Temp. Brigadier-General) Hugh Montague Trenchard, CB, DSO
24 March 1916 – 1 January 1917:	Captain (Temp. Major-General) Hugh Montague Trenchard, CB, DSO
1 January 1917 – 1 January 1918:	Major-General Hugh Montague Trenchard, CB, DSO
1–3 January 1918:	Major-General Sir Hugh Montague Trenchard, KCB, DSO
3 January 1918 – 1 January 1919:	Major-General (RAF) Sir Hugh Montague Trenchard, KCB, DSO
1 January – 1 August 1919:	Major-General (RAF) Sir Hugh Montague Trenchard, Bt., KCB, DSO
1–11 August 1919:	Air Vice-Marshal Sir Hugh Montague Trenchard, Bt., KCB, DSO
11 August 1919 – 1 April 1922:	Air Marshal Sir Hugh Montague Trenchard, Bt., KCB, DSO
1 April 1922 – 1 January 1924:	Air Chief Marshal Sir Hugh Montague Trenchard, Bt., KCB, DSO
1 January 1924 – 1 January 1927:	Air Chief Marshal Sir Hugh Montague Trenchard, Bt., GCB, DSO
1 January 1927 – 27 January 1930:	Marshal of the Royal Air Force Sir Hugh Montague Trenchard, Bt., GCB, DSO
27 January 1930 – 20 July 1935:	Marshal of the Royal Air Force The Right Honourable The Lord Trenchard of Wolfeton, Bt., GCB, DSO
20 July 1935 – 4 February 1936:	Marshal of the Royal Air Force The Right Honourable The Lord Trenchard of Wolfeton, Bt., GCB, GCVO, DSO
4 February 1936 – 1 January 1951:	Marshal of the Royal Air Force The Right Honourable The Viscount Trenchard of Wolfeton, Bt., GCB, GCVO, DSO
1 January 1951 – 10 February 1956:	Marshal of the Royal Air Force The Right Honourable The Viscount Trenchard of Wolfeton, Bt., GCB, OM, GCVO, DSO

== Honorary degrees ==
- 1926, Doctor of Civil Law, University of Oxford
- date unknown Doctor of Laws, University of Cambridge

== Foreign awards ==
- (Russian Empire) 25 August 1915, Order of St. Anne, 3rd Class with Swords, Russia
- 1910s, Croix de Guerre (France)
- 9 November 1916, Légion d'honneur, Croix de Commandeur, France
- 24 September 1917, Order of Leopold, Commander, Belgium
- 11 March 1918, Croix de guerre, Belgium
- 8 November 1918, Order of the Crown of Italy, Commander, Kingdom of Italy
- (Russian Empire) 1910s, Order of Saint Stanislaus, 1st Class with Swords, Russia
- 15 July 1919, Distinguished Service Medal, United States
- (Empire of Japan) 4 January 1921, Order of the Sacred Treasure, 1st Class, Japan
- date unknown, Order of the Two Rivers, Iraq

== Honorary appointments ==
- 13 July 1919 Colonel of the Royal Scots Fusiliers (with the honorary rank of Major-General). Resigned appointment on 1 May 1946.
