= Trenchard Museum =

Coordinates: 51°46′38″N 0°43′15″W

- Established: 26 June 1999
- Location: RAF Halton, Halton, Buckinghamshire, England
- Type: Military Museum
- Website: Official website

The Trenchard Museum is based at RAF Halton, Halton, Buckinghamshire, England. The overall aim of the museum is to preserve and display items that relate to the early history of the Royal Air Force, particularly the training of apprentices that took place at RAF Halton. It is named after Lord Trenchard, who is known as the father of the Royal Air Force, founded the aircraft apprentice scheme, and had a strong association with RAF Halton. The museum was opened in 1999.

The Trenchard Museum also incorporates the James McCudden Flight Heritage Centre and the Trenchard Archive. They are situated close together on the station.

== Collection and activities ==
The collection celebrates the history of RAF Halton, the origins of which go back to 1913 when the Royal Flying Corps were given permission by the then owner Alfred de Rothschild to use his estate at Halton for practicing manoeuvres. There are important exhibits recounting the major contribution of Lord Trenchard to the founding and development of the RAF, some of which were originally housed in a small museum in his name at RAF Upavon. The museum also records the background to apprentice training at the Halton camp through examples of the tools, work and test pieces completed by apprentices, and the exploits of some of those who were trained there. The museum has two complete aircraft, many models of aircraft, a number of aero engines, weapons and other equipment on display. There are a large number of photographs, a mock up of barrack rooms, and the uniforms worn by those stationed at Halton Camp over the years. Aside from artefacts relating to engineering, there is also memorabilia relating to a wide range of other training, including catering, nursing and dentistry.

== Management and funding ==
The Trenchard Museum was opened on 22 June 1999 by Hugh Trenchard, 3rd Viscount Trenchard, the grandson of Hugh Trenchard. The museum is managed by a curator, assisted by a small number of volunteers who have previous experience based at the Halton Camp or have an interest in the activities of RAF Halton. Funding of the museum is from small grants and through the supply of exhibits and other materials from the RAF. Many apprentice training artifacts have been loaned or donated by past apprentices, Financial support also comes via contributions from visitors and through educational activities.

The museum is open on Wednesdays and the second Saturday of the month plus additional times for groups by prior arrangement.

== See also ==
- List of aviation museums
