= Hugh Trenchard, 1st Viscount Trenchard =

British Royal Air Force founder (1873–1956)

Marshal of the Royal Air Force The Right Honourable The Viscount Trenchard GCB OM GCVO DSO
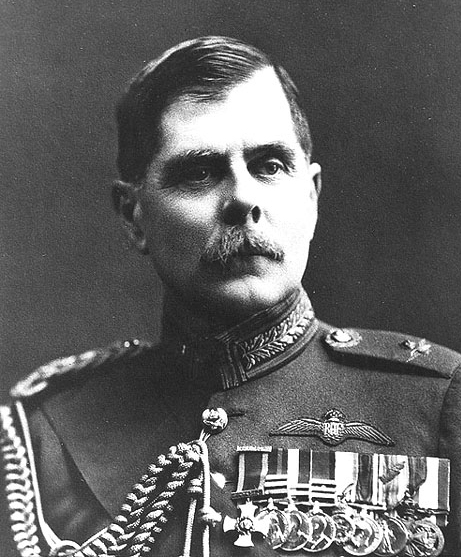
- Lord Trenchard in RAF full dress, c. 1930
- Born: 3 February 1873; Taunton, England
- Died: 10 February 1956 (aged 83); London, England
- Burial place: RAF Chapel, Westminster Abbey
- Spouse: Katherine Boyle (m. 1920)
- Relatives: The 2nd Viscount Trenchard (son)
- Military career
- Allegiance: United Kingdom
- Branch: British Army (1893–1918); Royal Air Force (1918–1930)
- Service years: 1893–1930
- Rank: Marshal of the Royal Air Force
- Commands: Chief of the Air Staff; Independent Air Force; Royal Flying Corps in the Field; First Wing, RFC; Military Wing, RFC; Southern Nigeria Regiment; 23rd Mounted Infantry Regiment (acting)
- Conflicts: Second Boer War; First World War; Second World War (semi-officially)
- Awards: Knight Grand Cross of the Order of the Bath; Member of the Order of Merit; Knight Grand Cross of the Royal Victorian Order; Companion of the Distinguished Service Order; (Full list)
- Other work: Commissioner of Police of the Metropolis; Chairman of the United Africa Company

Marshal of the Royal Air Force Hugh Montague Trenchard, 1st Viscount Trenchard, GCB, OM, GCVO, DSO (3 February 1873 – 10 February 1956), was a British military officer who was instrumental in establishing the Royal Air Force. He has been described as the "Father of the Royal Air Force".

During his formative years, Trenchard struggled academically, failing many examinations and only just succeeding in meeting the minimum standard for commissioned service in the British Army. As a young infantry officer, he served in India; with the outbreak of the Boer War, he volunteered for service in South Africa. While fighting the Boers, he was critically wounded; as a result of his injury, he lost a lung, was partially paralysed and returned to Great Britain. On medical advice, Trenchard travelled to Switzerland to recuperate, but owing to the boredom he suffered, took up bobsleighing. After a heavy crash, he found that his paralysis was gone and that he could walk unaided. Following further recuperation, he returned to active service in South Africa.

After the end of the Boer War, Trenchard saw service in Nigeria, where he was involved in efforts to bring the interior under settled British rule and quell intertribal violence. During his time in West Africa, he commanded the Southern Nigeria Regiment for several years.

Trenchard learned to fly in summer 1912, and gained his aviator's certificate (No. 270) on 31 July, flying a Henry Farman biplane of the Sopwith School of Flying at Brooklands. He was subsequently appointed as second-in-command of the Central Flying School. He held several senior positions in the Royal Flying Corps during the First World War, serving as the commander of the Royal Flying Corps in France from 1915 to 1917. In 1918, he briefly served as the first Chief of the Air Staff before taking up command of the Independent Air Force in France. Returning as Chief of the Air Staff under Winston Churchill in 1919, Trenchard spent the following decade securing the future of the Royal Air Force. He was Metropolitan Police Commissioner in the 1930s and a defender of the RAF in his later years. He is recognised today as one of the early advocates of strategic bombing.

== Early life ==
Hugh Montague Trenchard was born at 6 Haines Hill in Taunton, England, on 3 February 1873. He was the third child and second son of Henry Montague Trenchard and his wife Georgiana Louisa Catherine Tower Skene. Trenchard's father was a former captain in the King's Own Yorkshire Light Infantry who was working as an articled clerk in a legal practice and his mother was the daughter of the Royal Navy captain John McDowall Skene. Although in the 1870s the Trenchards were living in an unremarkable fashion, their forebears had played significant roles in English history. Notable ancestors were Sir Thomas Trenchard, a High Sheriff of Dorset in the 16th century and Sir John Trenchard, the Secretary of State under William III.

When Hugh Trenchard was two, the family moved to Courtlands, a manor house in Norton Fitzwarren, less than three miles (4 km) from the centre of Taunton. The country setting meant that he could enjoy an outdoor life, including spending time hunting rabbits and other small animals with the rifle he was given on his eighth birthday. It was during his junior years that he and his siblings were educated at home by a resident tutor, whom Trenchard did not respect. Unfortunately for his education, the tutor was neither strict enough nor skilful enough to overcome the children's mischievous attempts to avoid receiving instruction. As a consequence, Trenchard did not excel academically; however, his enthusiasm for games and riding was evident.

Trenchard aged 14 as a militia cadet

At the age of 10, he was sent to board at Allens Preparatory School near Botley in Hampshire. Although he did well at arithmetic, he struggled with the rest of the curriculum. However, his parents were not greatly concerned by his educational difficulties, believing that it would be no impediment to him following a military career. Georgina Trenchard wanted her son to follow her father's profession and enter the Royal Navy. In 1884 he was moved to Dover where he attended Hammond's, a cramming school for prospective entrants to HMS Britannia. He failed the Navy's entrance papers, and at the age of 13 he was sent to the Reverend Albert Pritchard's crammer, Hill Lands in Wargrave, Berkshire. Hill Lands prepared its pupils for Army commissions and, as before, Trenchard did not apply himself to his studies, preferring sports (rugby in particular) and practical joking.

In 1889, when he was 16 years old, his father, who had become a solicitor, was declared bankrupt. After initially being removed from Hill Lands, the young Trenchard was only able to return thanks to the charity of his relatives. He subsequently failed the Woolwich examinations twice and was then relegated to applying for the Militia which had lower entry standards. Even the Militia's examinations proved difficult for Trenchard, and he failed in 1891 and 1892. During this period he underwent a period of training as a probationary subaltern with the Forfar and Kincardine Artillery. Following his return to Pritchard's, he achieved a bare pass in March 1893. At the age of 20, he was gazetted as a second-lieutenant in the Second Battalion of the Royal Scots Fusiliers and posted to India.

== Early military career ==
=== India ===
Trenchard arrived in India in late 1893, joining his regiment at Sialkot in the Punjab. Not long after his arrival, he was called upon to make a speech at a mess dinner night. It was common practice for the youngest subaltern to make such a speech, and he was expected to cover several highlights of the Royal Scots Fusiliers' history. Instead he simply said: "I am deeply proud to belong to this great regiment", followed by "I hope one day I shall live to command it." His 'speech' was received with hoots of incredulous laughter, although some appreciated his nerve.

Young officers stationed in India in the 1890s enjoyed many social and sporting diversions, and Trenchard did little militarily. While every regiment was required to undertake a period of duty beyond the Khyber Pass, for the most part conditions of peace and prosperity were evident and he was able to engage in various sporting activities. In early 1894 he won the All-India Rifle Championship. After his success at shooting, he set about establishing a battalion polo team. Being of the infantry, his regiment had no history of playing polo and there were many obstacles to overcome. However, within six months the battalion polo team was competing and holding its own. It was during a polo match in 1896 that he first met Winston Churchill, with whom he clashed on the field of play. Trenchard's sporting prowess saved his reputation among his fellow officers. In other respects he did not fit in; lacking social graces and choosing to converse little, he was nicknamed "the camel", as like the beast he neither drank nor spoke.

It was during this period of his life in India that he took up reading. His first choice was for biographies, particularly of British heroes, and he kept the long hours he spent reading unobtrusive, but in so doing succeeded in providing himself with an education where the service crammers had failed. However, in military terms Trenchard was dissatisfied. He failed to see any action during his time in India, missing out on his regiment's turn at the frontier, as he was sent to England on sick leave for a hernia operation.

With the outbreak of the Second Boer War in October 1899, he applied several times to rejoin his old battalion, which had been sent to the Cape as part of the expeditionary corps. His requests were rejected by his colonel, and when the Viceroy Lord Curzon, who was concerned about the drain of leaders to South Africa, banned the dispatch of any further officers, Trenchard's prospects for seeing action looked bleak. However, a year or two previously, it had so happened that he had been promised help or advice from Sir Edmond Elles, as a gesture of thanks after rescuing a poorly planned rifle-shooting contest from disaster. By 1900, Elles was military secretary to Lord Curzon, and Trenchard (recently promoted to captain) sent a priority signal to Elles requesting that he be permitted to rejoin his unit overseas. This bold move worked, and he received his orders for South Africa several weeks later.

=== South Africa ===
On his arrival in South Africa, he rejoined the Royal Scots Fusiliers, and in July 1900 he was ordered to raise and train a mounted company within the 2nd Battalion. The Boers were accomplished horsemen and the tactics of the day placed a heavy strain upon the British cavalry. Accordingly, the British sought to raise mounted infantry units and Trenchard's polo-playing experiences led to him being selected to raise a mounted unit for service west of Johannesburg. Part of the newly formed company consisted of a group of volunteer Australian horsemen who, thus far being under-employed, had largely been noticed for excessive drinking, gambling and debauchery.

Trenchard's company came under the command of the 6th (Fusilier) Brigade which was headquartered at Krugersdorp. During September and early October 1900, it was involved in several skirmishes in the surrounding countryside. On 5 October the 6th Brigade, including Trenchard, departed Krugersdorp with the intention of drawing the Boers into battle on the plain where they might be defeated. However, before the brigade could reach the plain it had to pass through undulating terrain which favoured the Boer guerrilla tactics. The brigade travelled by night, and at dawn on 9 October the Ayrshire Yeomanry, who were in the vanguard, disturbed a Boer encampment. The Boers fled on horseback and Trenchard's company pursued them for 10 miles (16 km). The Boers, finding themselves unable to shake off Trenchard's pursuit, led them into an ambush. The Boers rode up a steep slope and disappeared into the valley beyond. When Trenchard made the ridge he saw the Dwarsvlei farmhouse with smoke coming from the chimney. It appeared to him that the Boers thought they had got away and were eating breakfast unawares. He placed his troops on the heights around the building and after half an hour's observation led a patrol of four men down towards the farmhouse. The remainder of the company were to close in on his signal. However, when Trenchard and his patrol reached the valley floor and broke cover the Boers opened fire from about a dozen points and bullets whistled past it. He pressed forward reaching the sheltering wall of the farmhouse. As he headed for the door, Trenchard was hit by a Boer bullet to the chest. The rest of the company, seeing their leader fall, descended from the heights to engage the Boers at close quarters in and around the farmhouse. Many of the Boers were killed or wounded, a few fled and several were taken prisoner. Trenchard being critically wounded was medically evacuated to Krugersdorp.

== Medical treatment and convalescence ==
After he was brought to the hospital in Krugersdorp, he slipped from semi-consciousness into unconsciousness. The surgeons believed that he would die as the bullet had punctured his left lung and they had removed six-and-a-half pints of blood from his pleural cavity through a tube. On the third day, he regained consciousness but spent most of that day sleeping. After three weeks, he had shown some improvement and was moved to Johannesburg, where he made further progress. However, when he tried to rise from his bed, he discovered that he was unable to put weight on his feet, leading him to suspect that he was partially paralysed. He was next moved to Maraisburg for convalescing and there he confirmed that he was suffering from partial paralysis below the waist. The doctors surmised that after passing through his lung, the bullet had damaged his spine.

In December 1900, he returned to England, arriving by hospital ship at Southampton. He hobbled with the aid of sticks down the gangplank where his concerned parents met him. As a disabled soldier without independent financial means, he was now at his lowest point. He spent the next fortnight at a Mayfair nursing home for disabled officers which was run by the Red Cross. His case came to the attention of Lady Dudley, by whose philanthropic efforts the Mayfair nursing home operated. Through her generosity, she arranged for him to see a specialist who said that he needed to spend several months in Switzerland where the air was likely to be of benefit to his lung. Neither he or his family could afford this expense, and he was too embarrassed to explain the situation. However, without asking any questions, Lady Dudley presented him with a cheque to cover the expense.

After winning the Freshman and Novices' Cups for 1901

On Sunday 30 December, he arrived in St Moritz to begin a Swiss convalescence. Boredom saw him take up bobsleighing as it did not require much use of his legs. Initially he was prone to leave the run and end up in the snow, but after some days of practice he usually managed to stay on track. It was during a heavy crash from the Cresta Run that his spine was somehow readjusted, enabling him to walk freely immediately after regaining consciousness. Around a week later, he won the St. Moritz Tobogganing Club's Freshman and Novices' Cups for 1901, a remarkable triumph for a man who had been unable to walk unaided only a few days before.

On arrival back in England, he visited Lady Dudley to thank her, and then set about engineering his return to South Africa. His lung was not fully healed, causing him pain and leaving him breathless. Furthermore, the War Office was sceptical about his claim to be fully fit and was disinclined to allow him to forgo his remaining nine months of sick leave. He then took several months of tennis coaching in order to strengthen his remaining lung. Early in the summer of 1901, he entered two tennis competitions, reaching the semi-finals both times and gaining favourable press coverage. He then sent the newspaper clippings to the doctors at the War Office, arguing that this tennis ability proved he was fit for active service. After attending a medical board, he had his sick leave reduced and was able to return to South Africa in July 1901.

== Return to Africa ==
=== Back in South Africa ===
Upon his return, he made his way to Pretoria, arriving there in late July 1901. He was assigned to a company of the 12th Mounted Infantry where patrolling duties required long days in the saddle. His wound still caused considerable pain, and the entry and exit scars frequently bled.

Trenchard (shown left) in South Africa

Later in the year, he was summoned to see Kitchener, who was now the commander-in-chief in the South African theatre. He was tasked with re-organising a demoralised mounted infantry company, which was completed in under a month. Kitchener then sent him to D'Aar in the Cape Colony to expedite the training of a new corps of mounted infantry. Kitchener summoned Trenchard for the third time in October 1901, this time sending him on a mission to capture the Boer Government, who were in hiding. Kitchener had received intelligence on their location and he hoped to damage the morale of Boer commandos at large by sending a small group of men to capture their political leadership. Trenchard was accompanied by a column of so-called loyalist Boers whose motives he distrusted. Also with him were several British NCOs and nine mixed-race guides. After riding through the night, Trenchard's party were ambushed the next morning. He and his men took cover and gave fight. After Trenchard's column had suffered casualties, the ambush party withdrew. Although this last mission failed, he was praised for his efforts with a mention in despatches.

Trenchard spent the remainder of 1901 on patrolling duties, and in early 1902 he was appointed acting commander of the 23rd Mounted Infantry Regiment. During the last few months of the war, he only once got the opportunity to lead his regiment into action. In response to Boer cattle rustling, Zulu raiders crossed the border into the Transvaal and the 23rd Mounted Infantry Regiment took action. After peace terms were agreed in May 1902, he was involved in supervising the disarming of the Boers, and later took leave. In July the 23rd, Mounted Infantry was recalled to Middleburg 400 miles to the south, and after the trek, Trenchard occupied himself with polo and race meetings. He was promoted to brevet major in August 1902.

=== Nigeria ===
Following the end of the Boer War, Trenchard was seconded to stay in South Africa, but he applied for service in the West African Frontier Force and was granted the position of deputy commandant of the Southern Nigeria Regiment, with the promise that he was entitled to lead all regimental expeditions. On arrival in Nigeria in December 1903, he initially had some difficulty in getting his commanding officer to allow him to lead the upcoming expedition, and only replaced his superior by going over his head.

Once established, Trenchard spent the next six years on various expeditions to the interior patrolling, surveying and mapping an area of 10,000 square miles which later came to be known as Biafra. In the occasional clashes with the Ibo tribesmen, Trenchard gained decisive victories. The many tribesmen who surrendered were given jobs as road builders and thereby began to develop the country as part of the British Empire. From summer 1904 to the late summer 1905, Trenchard was acting commandant of the Southern Nigeria Regiment. He was appointed to the Distinguished Service Order in 1906 and was commandant with the temporary rank of lieutenant colonel from 1908 onwards.

== England and Ireland ==
In early 1910, Trenchard became seriously ill and after several months he returned home, this time with a liver abscess. Back in England, he did not recover quickly and probably prolonged his convalescence by over-exertion. However, by the late summer, he was well enough to take his parents on holiday to the West Country.

October 1910 saw him posted to Derry, where the 2nd Battalion of the Royal Scots Fusiliers were garrisoned. He was reduced from a temporary lieutenant-colonel to major and made a company commander. He occupied himself during the routine of garrison life with playing polo and he took up hunting. Finding peace-time regimental life dull, he sought to expand his area of responsibility by attempting to reorganise his fellow officers' administrative procedures, which they resented. He also clashed with Colonel Stuart, his commanding officer, who told him that the town was too small for both of them, and by February 1912 had resorted to applying for employment with various colonial defence forces, without success.

== Flying school ==
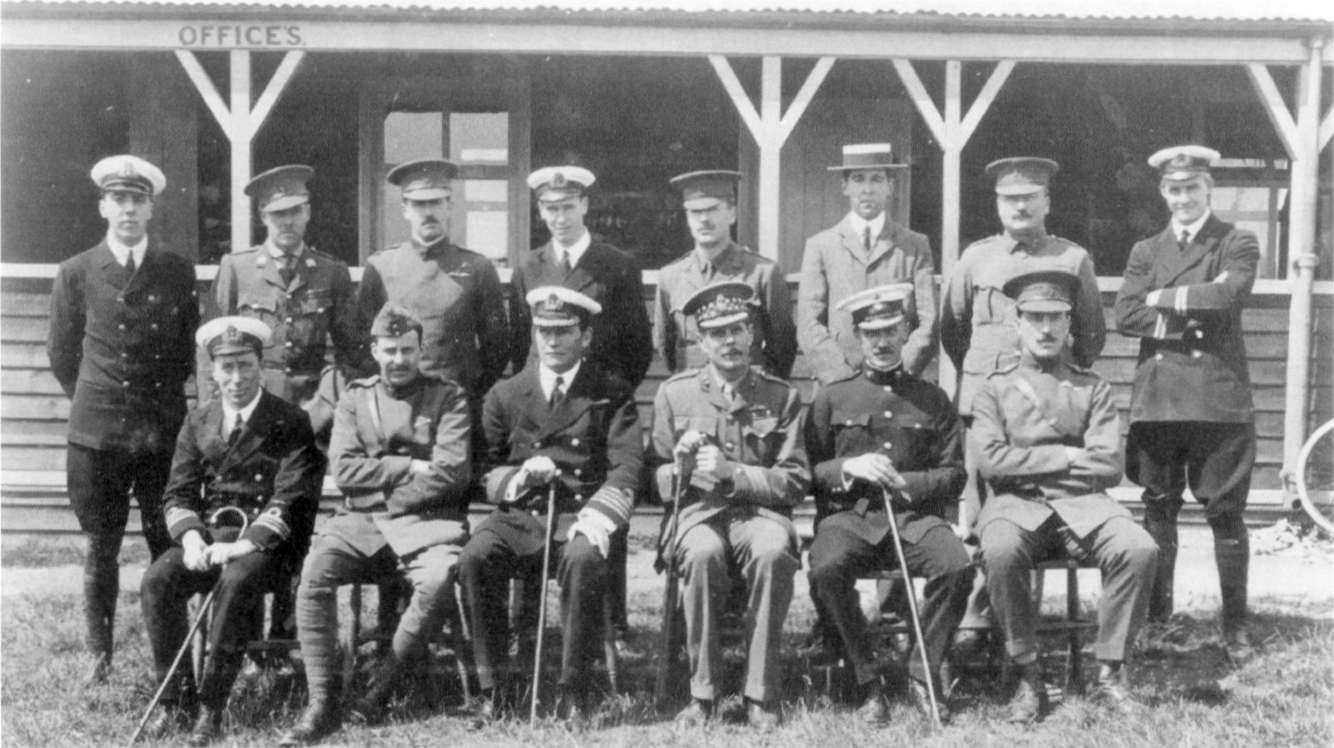
The Central Flying School staff at Upavon in January 1913. Trenchard is in the front row, shown third from the right.

During his time in Ireland, he received a letter from Captain Eustace Loraine, urging him to take up flying. Trenchard and Loraine had been friends in Nigeria, and on his return to England, Loraine had learned to fly. After some effort, Trenchard persuaded his commanding officer to grant him three months of paid leave so that he might train as a pilot. He arrived in London on 6 July 1912, only to discover that Captain Loraine had been killed in a flying accident on the previous day. At the age of 39, Trenchard was just below the maximum age of 40 for military student pilots at the Central Flying School, and so he did not postpone his plan to become an aviator.

When he arrived at Thomas Sopwith's flying school at Brooklands, he told Sopwith than he only had 10 days to gain his aviator's certificate. He succeeded in going solo on 31 July, gaining his Royal Aero Club aviator's certificate (No. 270) on a Henry Farman biplane. The course had cost £75, and involved a meagre two-and-a-half weeks' tuition and a total of 64 minutes in the air. Although Copland Perry, Trenchard's instructor, noted that teaching him to fly had been "no easy performance", Trenchard himself had been "a model pupil." His difficulties were in some measure due to his partial blindness in one eye, a fact he kept secret.

He arrived at Upavon airfield, where the Central Flying School was based, and was assigned to Arthur Longmore's flight. Bad weather delayed Longmore from assessing his new pupil, and before the weather improved, the school's commandant, Captain Godfrey Paine RN had co-opted Trenchard to the permanent staff. Part of Trenchard's new duties included those of school examiner, and so he set himself a paper, sat it, marked it and awarded himself his 'wings'. His flying ability still left much to be desired, and Longmore soon discovered his pupil's deficiencies. Over the following weeks, Trenchard spent many hours improving his flying technique. After he had finished his flying course, he was officially appointed as an instructor. However, he was a poor pilot and he did no instructing, instead becoming involved in administrative duties. As a member of the staff, he organised the training and establishment of procedures for the new arm. He paid particular attention to ensuring that skills were acquired in practical topics such as map reading, signalling, and engine mechanics. It was during his time at the Central Flying School that he earned the nickname "Boom", either for his stentorian utterances, or for his low rumbling tones.

In September 1912, he acted as an air observer during the Army Manoeuvres. His experiences here developed his understanding of the military utility of flyers working in cooperation with the British Army's ground forces. In September 1913, he was appointed Assistant Commandant and promoted to temporary lieutenant-colonel. Trenchard's paths crossed once more with Winston Churchill, who was by then First Lord of the Admiralty, and himself learning to fly at Eastchurch and Upavon. Trenchard formed a distinctly unfavourable opinion of Churchill's ability as a pilot. In January 1914 he was made a CB in the 1914 New Year Honours.

== First World War ==
=== Officer Commanding the Military Wing ===
With the outbreak of First World War, Trenchard was appointed officer commanding the Military Wing of the Royal Flying Corps, replacing Lieutenant-colonel Sykes. This appointment put him in charge of the Royal Flying Corps's home garrison, which retained one-third of the Corps' total strength. Its headquarters were at Farnborough, and being disappointed about remaining in England he applied to rejoin his old regiment in France. However, the head of the RFC, General Sir David Henderson, refused to release him. Trenchard's new duties included providing replacements and raising new squadrons for service on the continent. He initially set himself a target of 12 squadrons; however, Sefton Brancker, the Assistant Director of Military Aeronautics, suggested that this should be raised to 30, and Lord Kitchener later increased the target to 60. In order to begin the task of creating these squadrons, Trenchard commandeered his old civilian training school at Brooklands, and then used its aircraft and equipment as a starting point for the establishment of new training schools elsewhere.

In early October 1914, Kitchener sent for Trenchard and tasked him with providing a battle-worthy squadron forthwith. The squadron was to be used to support land and naval forces seeking to prevent the German flanking manoeuvres during the Race to the Sea. On 7 October, only 36 hours later, No. 6 Squadron flew to Belgium, the first of many additional squadrons to be provided.

Later in October, detailed planning for a major reorganisation of the Flying Corps' command structure took place. Henderson offered Trenchard command of the soon-to-be created First Wing. He accepted the offer on the basis that he would not be subordinated to Sykes, whom he distrusted. The next month, the Military Wing was abolished and its units based in the United Kingdom were re-grouped as the Administrative Wing. Command of the Administrative Wing was given to Lieutenant Colonel E B Ashmore.

=== Commander of the First Wing ===
Trenchard took up command of the First Wing in November 1914, establishing its headquarters at Merville. On arrival he discovered that Sykes was to replace Henderson as commander of the Royal Flying Corps in the Field, making Sykes Trenchard's immediate superior. Trenchard bore Sykes some animosity and their working relationship was troubled. Trenchard appealed to Kitchener, by then the Secretary of State for War, threatening to resign. Trenchard's discomfort was relieved when in December 1914 Kitchener ordered that Henderson resume command of the Royal Flying Corps in the Field. The R.F.C.'s First Wing consisted of Nos Two and Three Squadrons flying in support of the British Army's IV Corps and Indian Corps. After the First Army of the BEF under General Sir Douglas Haig came into being in December 1914, the First Wing provided support to its operations.

In early January 1915 Haig summoned Trenchard, who on the 18th of that month was promoted to brevet lieutenant colonel, to explain what might be achieved in the air war. During the meeting, Haig brought him into his confidence regarding plans by the First Army for a March attack in the Merville/Neuve Chapelle region. After aerial photographic reconnaissance had been gathered, the British plans for the attack were reworked in February in consequence. During the Battle of Neuve Chapelle in March the R.F.C., and especially the First Wing, supported the operation. This was the first time that aircraft were used as bombers with missiles strapped to the wings and fuselage as opposed to being released by hand which had happened earlier in the war. However, the bombing from the air had little effect due to limited weight payload capacity, and the Royal Artillery disregarded the information provided by the R.F.C.'s airmen. Prior to the British First Army's offensives at Ypres and Aubers Ridge in April and May, the First Wing's crews flew reconnaissance sorties using aerial cameras over the German lines. Despite the detailed information this provided and the improved air-artillery cooperation during the battles, the offensives were inconclusive. At the end of this engagement Henderson offered Trenchard the position as his chief of staff. He declined the offer, citing his unsuitability for the role, although his ambition for command may have been the real reason. In any case, this did not stop his promotion to full colonel in June 1915.

=== Commander of the Royal Flying Corps ===
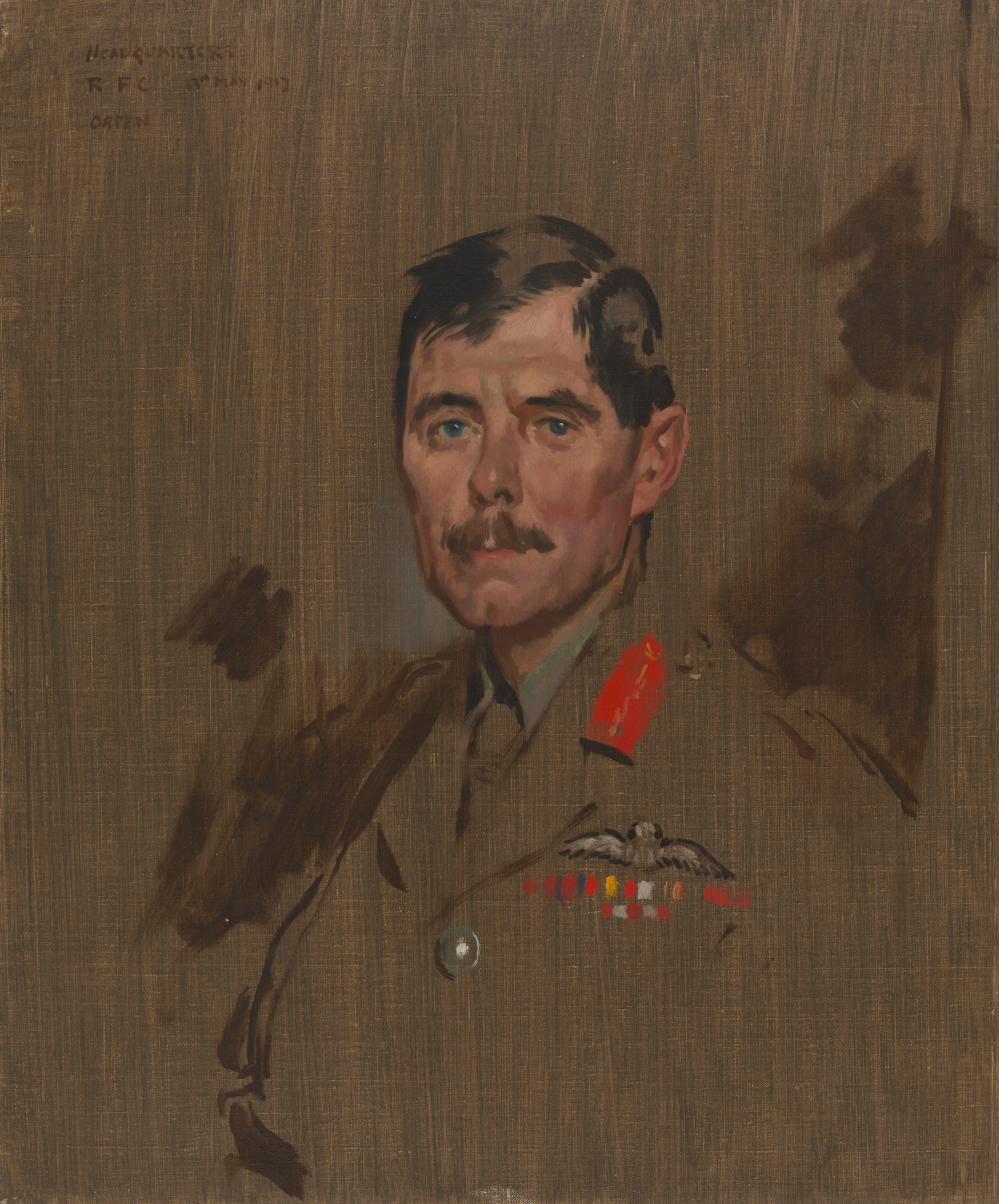
Trenchard at the Flying Corps' general headquarters, May 1917, by William Orpen

On Henderson's return to the War Office in the summer of 1915, Trenchard was promoted to brigadier-general and appointed officer commanding the R.F.C.'s units in France. He was to serve as the head of the R.F.C. in the field until the early days of 1918. In December 1915, when General Haig was appointed as commander-in-chief (C-in-C) of the British Expeditionary Force (BEF), Haig and Trenchard re-established their partnership, this time at a higher level. In March 1916, with the RFC expanding, Trenchard was promoted to the temporary rank of major-general. In January 1917 the rank was made permanent.

Trenchard's time in command of the R.F.C. on the Western Front was characterised by three priorities. First was an emphasis on support to and co-ordination with ground forces. This started with reconnaissance and artillery co-ordination, and later encompassed tactical low-level bombing of enemy ground targets. While he did not oppose the strategic bombing of Germany in principle, he rejected moves to divert his forces on to long-range bombing missions as he believed the strategic role to be less important and his resource to be too limited. Secondly, he stressed the importance of morale, not only of his own airmen, but more generally the detrimental effect that the presence of an aircraft had upon the morale of enemy ground troops. Finally, he had an unswerving belief in the importance of offensive action. Although this belief was widely held by senior British commanders in the war, the R.F.C.'s routinely offensive strategy resulted in the loss of many of its air crews and machines, and some doubted its military validity.

Following the Gotha raids on London in the summer of 1917, the Government considered creating an air force by merging the R.F.C. and the Royal Naval Air Service. Trenchard opposed this, believing that it would dilute the air support required by the ground forces in France. By October he realised that the creation of an "Air Force" was inevitable and, seeing that he was the obvious candidate to become the new Chief of the Air Staff, he attempted to bring about a scheme whereby he would retain control of the flying units on the Western Front. In this regard he was unsuccessful, and he was succeeded in France by Major-general John Salmond.

=== Chief of the Air Staff (1st appointment) ===
After the Air Force (Constitution) Act 1917 was given royal assent on 29 November 1917, there followed a period of political manoeuvring and speculation over who would take up the new posts of Air Minister, Chief of the Air Staff and other senior positions within soon-to-be-created Air Ministry. Trenchard was summoned back from France, crossing the Channel on a destroyer on the morning of 16 December. At around 3 pm he met newspaper proprietor Lord Rothermere, who had recently been appointed as Air Minister by David Lloyd George for political reasons. Rothermere offered Trenchard the post of Chief of the Air Staff and before Trenchard could respond explained that Trenchard's support would be useful to him as he was about to launch a press campaign against Sir Douglas Haig and Sir William Robertson, the Chief of the Imperial General Staff. On hearing this Trenchard flatly refused the position, being personally loyal to Haig and antipathetic to political intrigue. Rothermere and his brother Lord Northcliffe, who was also present, then spent over 12 hours acrimoniously debating with Trenchard. The brothers pointed out that if Trenchard refused, they would use the fact to attack Haig on the false premise that Haig had refused to release Trenchard. Trenchard defended in the debate Haig's policy of constant attacks on the Western Front, arguing that it had been preferable to standing on the defensive, and he himself also had maintained an offensive posture throughout the war which, like the infantry, had resulted in the Flying Corps taking extremely heavy casualties. In the end, the brothers wore Trenchard down, and he accepted the post on the condition that he first be permitted to consult with Haig. After meeting with Haig, Trenchard wrote to Rothermere, accepting the post.

=== Disputes and resignation ===
The New Year saw Trenchard made a Knight Commander of the Order of the Bath, and he was appointed Chief of the Air Staff on the newly formed Air Council. He began work on 18 January. During his first month at the Air Ministry he clashed with Rothermere over several issues. First, Rothermere's tendency to disregard his professional advisors in favour of outside experts irritated Trenchard. Secondly, Rothermere insisted that Trenchard claim as many men for the newly formed Royal Air Force as possible, even if they might be better employed in the other services. Thirdly, Rothermere and Trenchard disagreed on nominees for senior appointments in the RAF. Finally and most significantly, they disagreed over proper future use of air power, which Trenchard judged as being vital in preventing a repeat of the strategic stalemate which had occurred along the Western Front. Also during this period, Trenchard resisted pressure from several press barons to support an "air warfare scheme"; this would have seen the British armies withdrawn from France, and an attempt to defeat Germany entrusted to the RAF. Despite the differences with Rothermere, Trenchard was able to put in place planning for the merger of the Royal Flying Corps and the Royal Naval Air Service. However, as the weeks went on they became increasingly estranged personally, and a low point was reached in mid-March when Trenchard discovered that Rothermere had promised the Navy 4000 aircraft for anti-submarine duties. He accorded the highest priority to air operations on the Western Front's land campaign: there were fewer than 400 spare aircraft in the United Kingdom. On 18 March they exchanged letters, Trenchard expressing his dissatisfaction and Rothermere curtly replying. The following day Trenchard sent Rothermere a letter of resignation. and although Rothermere asked him to remain, Trenchard only agreed to defer the date until after 1 April 1918, when the Royal Air Force would officially come into being.

After the Germans overran the British Fifth Army on 21 March 1918, Trenchard ordered all available reserves of aircrew, engines and aircraft to be speedily transported to France. Reports reached him on 26 March that concentrations of Flying Corps' machines were assisting in stopping German advances. On 5 April, Trenchard travelled to France, inspecting squadrons and updating his understanding of the air situation. On his return, he briefed the Prime Minister, David Lloyd George, and several other ministers on air activity and the general situation in France.

On 10 April, Rothermere informed Trenchard that the War Cabinet had accepted his resignation, and Trenchard was offered his old job in France. He refused the offer, saying that replacing Salmond at the height of battle would be "damnable". Three days later Major-general Frederick Sykes replaced him as Chief of the Air Staff. On the following Monday, Trenchard was summoned to Buckingham Palace where King George listened to his account of the events which caused him to resign. Trenchard then wrote to the Prime Minister stating the facts of his case and pointing out that in the course of the affair, Rothermere had stated his intention to resign also. Trenchard's letter was circulated among the Cabinet, with a vindictive response written by Rothermere. Around the same time, the question of Rothermere's general competence as Air Minister was brought to the attention of Lloyd George. Rothermere, realising his situation, offered his resignation, which was made public on 25 April 1918.

=== In-between duties ===
In the weeks that followed his resignation, Trenchard was without a role and he kept a low profile, avoiding the Press and making no public comments. The new Air Minister, Sir William Weir, under pressure to find a position for Trenchard, offered him command of the yet to be formed Independent Force, which was to conduct long-range bombing operations against Germany. Instead, Trenchard, seeking equal status with Sykes, argued for a re-organisation of the RAF which would have seen him appointed as the RAF's commander of fighting operations, while Sykes would have been left to deal with administrative matters. Weir did not accept his proposal and instead gave Trenchard several options. Trenchard rejected the offer of a proposed new post which would have meant a London-based command of the bombing operations conducted from Ochey, arguing that the responsibility was Newall's under the direction of Salmond. He also turned down the post of Grand Co-ordinator of British and American air policy, and that of Inspector General of the RAF overseas. Weir then offered him command of all air force units in the Middle East, or the post of Inspector-General of the RAF at home, but strongly encouraged him to take command of the independent long-range bombing forces in France.

Trenchard had many reasons for not accepting any of these posts, which he saw as titular, with little value and lacking practical authority. On 8 May 1918 Trenchard was sitting on a bench in Green Park when he overheard a naval officer saying to another: "I don't know why the Government should pander to a man who threw in his hand at the height of a battle, if I'd my way with Trenchard I'd have him shot." Afterwards Trenchard walked home and wrote to Weir accepting command of the as yet unformed Independent Force.

=== Commander of the Independent Air Force ===
After a period of what was officially termed "special duty" in France, Trenchard was appointed general officer commanding of the Independent Air Force on 15 June 1918, with his headquarters in Nancy, France. The Independent Air Force continued the task of the VIII Brigade from which it was formed, carrying out strategic bombing attacks on German railways, airfields and industrial centres. Initially, the French general Ferdinand Foch, as the newly appointed Supreme Allied Commander, refused to recognize the Independent Air Force, which caused some logistical difficulties. The problems were resolved after a meeting of Trenchard and General de Castelnau, who disregarded the concerns about the status of the Independent Air Force and did not block the much-needed supplies. Trenchard also improved the links between the RAF and the American Air Service, providing advanced tuition in bombing techniques to the newly arriving American aviators.

In September 1918, Trenchard's Force indirectly supported the American Air Service during the Battle of Saint-Mihiel, attacking German airfields in that sector of the front, along with supply depots and rail lines. Trenchard's close co-operation with the Americans and the French was formalized when his command was redesignated the Inter-Allied Independent Air Force in late October 1918, and placed directly under the orders of Foch. When the November 1918 armistice came, Trenchard sought permission from Foch to return his squadrons to British command, which was granted. Trenchard was succeeded as commander of the Independent Air Force by his deputy Brigadier-General Courtney. Trenchard departed France in mid-November 1918 and returned to England to take a holiday.

== Between the wars ==
=== Army mutiny in Southampton ===
After two months on the RAF's inactive list, Trenchard returned to military duties in mid-January 1919, when Sir William Robertson, the commander-in-chief of Home Forces, asked him to get control of around 5,000 mutinying soldiers at Southampton Docks, who were protesting about being sent to France with the war being over. Putting on his Army general's uniform, Trenchard arrived at the docks with a staff of two, his clerk and Maurice Baring, his aide-de-camp. He initially attempted to speak with the disorderly mob of soldiers, but was heckled and jostled in the process. He then summoned a detachment of two hundred and fifty reliable troops in fighting order to be sent into Southampton to confront the situation. On their arrival he issued them with extra ammunition for their rifles, and ordered them to fix bayonets, and leading them to the dock's sheds where the protesting troops were gathered, summarily threatened the recalcitrant troops with fire being opened upon them if they failed immediately to come back into order, at which they complied.

=== Chief of the Air Staff (2nd appointment) ===
==== Re-appointment and sickness ====
In early 1919 Churchill was appointed Secretary of State for War and Secretary of State for Air. While Churchill was preoccupied with implementing post-war defence cuts and the demobilization of the Army, the Chief of the Air Staff, Major-general Frederick Sykes, submitted a paper with what were at the time unrealistic proposals for a large air force of the future. Being dissatisfied with Sykes, Churchill began to consider reinstating Trenchard, whose recent performance at Southampton had once more brought him into favour with Churchill.

During the first week in February, Trenchard was summoned to London by official telegram. At the War Office, Churchill asked him to come back as Chief of the Air Staff. Trenchard replied that he could not take up the appointment, for Sykes was currently in post. After Churchill indicated that Sykes might be appointed Controller of Civil Aviation and made a Knight Grand Cross of the Order of the British Empire (GBE), Trenchard agreed to consider the offer. Churchill, not wanting to leave matters hanging, asked Trenchard to provide him with a paper outlining his ideas on the re-organisation of the Air Ministry. Trenchard's briefly written statement of the essentials required met with Churchill's approval, and he insisted that Trenchard take the appointment, Trenchard returning to the Air Ministry in mid-February and formally taking up post as Chief of the Air Staff on 31 March 1919.

For most of March he was unable to do much work as he had contracted Spanish flu. During this period he wrote to Katherine Boyle (née Salvin), the widow of his friend and fellow officer James Boyle, whom he knew from his time in Ireland. At his request, Mrs Boyle took on the task of nursing him back to health. Once he had recovered, he proposed marriage to Katherine Boyle, who refused. Trenchard remained in contact with her, and when he proposed marriage again, she accepted. On 17 July 1920, they were married at St. Margaret's Church in Westminster.

==== Establishing the RAF and the struggle for survival ====
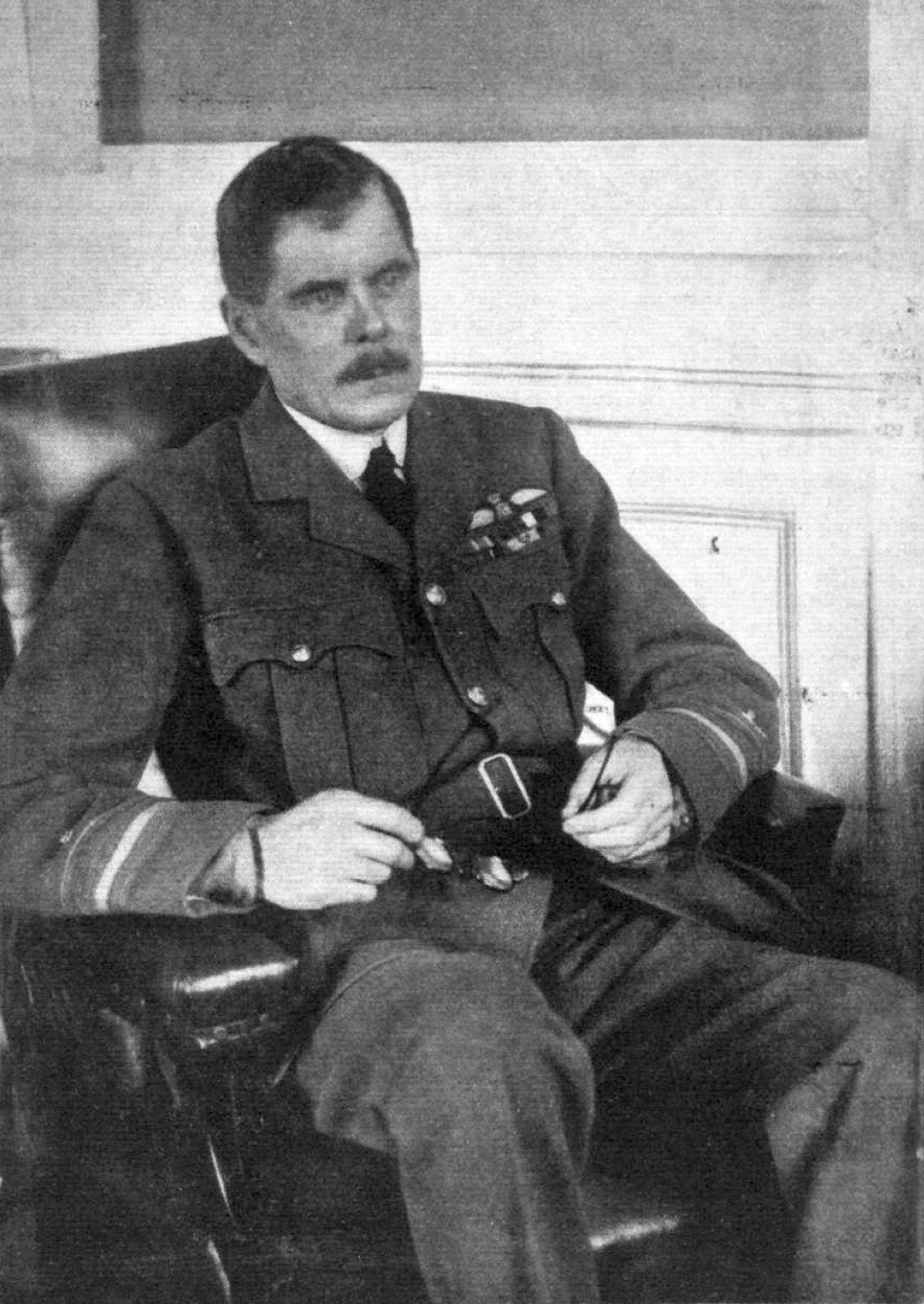
Trenchard as Chief of the Air Staff in June 1919

During the summer of 1919, Trenchard worked on completing the demobilization of the RAF and establishing it on a peacetime basis. This was a sizable task as the force was budgeted to shrink from 280 squadrons to around 28. It was also during this time that the new RAF officer ranks were decided upon, despite some opposition from members of the Army Council. Trenchard himself was regraded from major-general to air vice-marshal, and then promoted to air marshal a few days later.

By the autumn of 1919, the budgetary effects of Lloyd George's Ten Year Rule were causing Trenchard some difficulty as he sought to develop the institutions of the RAF. He had to argue against the view that the Army and Navy should provide all the support services and education, leaving the RAF only to provide flying training. He viewed this idea as a precursor to the break-up of the RAF, and in spite of the costs, he wanted its own institutions which would develop airmanship and engender the air spirit. Having convinced Churchill of his case, he oversaw the founding of the RAF (Cadet) College at Cranwell as the world's first military air academy. In 1920 he inaugurated the Aircraft Apprentice system, which provided the RAF with highly technically trained specialist ground-crews for the next 70 years. In 1922 the RAF Staff College at Andover was established to provide air force specific training to the RAF's middle-ranking officers.

Late 1919 saw Trenchard created a baronet and granted £10,000 for his war services. Although he had attained a measure of financial security, the future of the RAF was far from assured. He judged that the chief threat to the new service came from the new First Sea Lord, Admiral Beatty. Looking to take the initiative, Trenchard arranged to see Beatty, meeting with him in early December, Trenchard, arguing that the "air is one and indivisible", put forward a case for an air force with its own strategic role which also controlled army and navy co-operation squadrons. Beatty did not accept Trenchard's argument and Trenchard resorted to asking for a 12 months amnesty to put his plans into action. The request appealed to Beatty's sense of fair play, and he agreed to let Trenchard be until the end of 1920. Around this time Trenchard indicated to Beatty that control over some supporting elements of naval aviation (but not aircrew or aircraft) might be returned to the Admiralty. Trenchard also offered Beatty the option of locating the Air Ministry staff who worked in connection with naval aviation at the Admiralty. Beatty declined the offer and later, when no transfer of any naval aviation assets occurred, came to the view that Trenchard had acted in bad faith.

During the early 1920s, the continued independent existence of the RAF and its control of naval aviation were subject to a series of Government reviews. The Balfour Report of 1921, the Geddes Axe of 1922, and the Salisbury Committee of 1923 all found in favour of the RAF's continued existence, despite lobbying from the Admiralty and opposition in Parliament. On each occasion Trenchard and his staff officers, supported by Christopher Bullock, worked to show that the RAF provided good value for money, and was required for the long-term strategic security of the United Kingdom.

Trenchard also sought to secure the RAF's future by finding a war-fighting role for the new Service. In 1920 he successfully argued that it should take the lead during the 1920 conflict between British forces and Somaliland dervishes. The success of this small air action then allowed him to put the case for the RAF's air policing of the vast distances of the British Empire. Trenchard particularly argued for it to take the lead in Iraq at the Cairo Conference of 1921, and in 1922 the RAF was given control of all British Forces in Iraq. The RAF also carried out imperial air policing over India's North-West Frontier Province. In early 1920 he suggested that it could even be used to violently suppress if necessary "industrial disturbances, or risings" in the United Kingdom itself, following on from his experience in such matters in successfully quelling the troop mutiny at Southampton Docks in the previous year. Churchill was unsettled at Trenchard's apparent willingness to use lethal military force domestically upon British subjects, and told him by reply not to refer to this proposal again.

==== Later years as Chief of the Air Staff ====
By late 1924 the creation of the reserve air force, known as the Auxiliary Air Force, meant that Trenchard was able to modestly expand the RAF's strength, and over the next two years, 25 auxiliary squadrons were created. It was during this period that he oversaw the introduction of the short-service commission scheme. which proved to be useful in providing some of the regular manning on the new squadrons. He also instigated the University Air Squadron scheme, and in 1925 the first three U.A.S. squadrons were formed at Cambridge, London and Oxford.

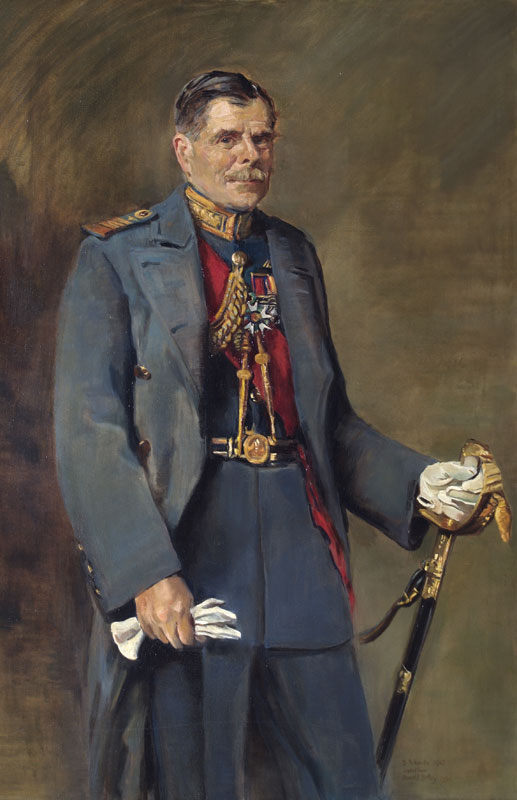
Trenchard as a marshal of the RAF wearing full dress with greatcoat

Since the early 1920s Trenchard had supported the development of a flying bomb, and by 1927 a prototype, code-named "Larynx", was successfully tested. However, development costs were not insignificant and in 1928, when he applied for further funding, the Committee of Imperial Defence and the Cabinet discontinued the project. Following the British failure to win the Schneider Trophy in 1925, Trenchard ensured that finances were available for an RAF team, with which the High Speed Flight was formed in preparation for the 1927 race. After the British won in 1927, he continued to use Air Ministry funds to support the race, including purchasing two Supermarine S.6 aircraft which won the race in 1929. He was criticised for this by figures in HM Treasury for wasting money.

On 1 January 1927, Trenchard was promoted from air chief marshal to marshal of the Royal Air Force, becoming the first person to hold the RAF's highest rank. The following year he began to feel that he had achieved all he could as Chief of the Air Staff and that he should give way to a younger man, and he offered his resignation to the Cabinet in late 1928, although it was not initially accepted. Around the same time as Trenchard was considering his future, the British Legation and some European diplomatic staff based in Kabul in the Kingdom of Afghanistan were cut off from the outside world as a result of the civil war in Afghanistan. After word of the crisis had reached London, the Foreign Secretary Austen Chamberlain sent for Trenchard, who assured him that the RAF would be able to rescue the stranded civilians. The Kabul Airlift began on Christmas Eve and took nine weeks to rescue around 600 people.

Trenchard continued as Chief of the Air Staff until 1 January 1930. Immediately after he had relinquished his appointment, he was created Baron Trenchard, of Wolfeton in the County of Dorset, entering the House of Lords, becoming the RAF's first peer. Looking back over Trenchard's time as Chief of the Air Staff, while he had preserved the fledgling RAF, his emphasis on the Air Force providing defence at a comparatively low cost had led to a stagnation and even deterioration in the quality of the service's fighting equipment.

=== Metropolitan Police Commissioner ===
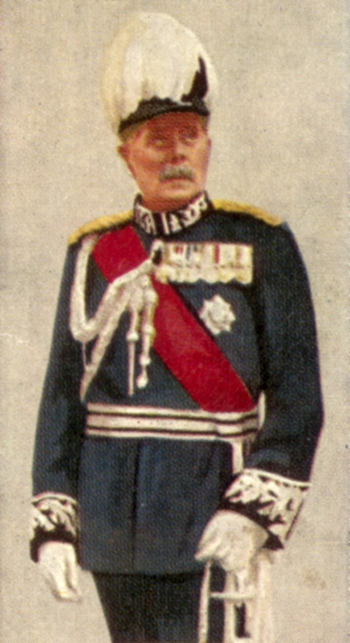
Lord Trenchard as Commissioner of the Metropolitan Police

After he retired from the military, he worked as a director of the Goodyear Tire and Rubber Company, largely disappearing from public life. However, in March 1931, Prime Minister Ramsay MacDonald asked him to take the post of Metropolitan Police Commissioner, which after initially declining, he accepted in October 1931. He served as head of the Metropolitan Police until 1935. During his tenure he instigated several reforms, including limiting membership of the Police Federation, introducing limited terms of employment, and the creation of separate career paths for the lower and higher ranks akin to the military system of officer and non-commissioned career streams. The recruitment base was broadened, and persons with university degrees were encouraged to apply. Perhaps Trenchard's most well-known achievement during his time as Commissioner was the establishment of the Hendon Police College, which originally was the institution from which Trenchard's junior inspectors graduated before following a career in the higher ranks. He retired in November 1935, in his final few months as Police Commissioner having been awarded the Knight Grand Cross of the Royal Victorian Order.

=== Later inter-war years ===
During his time as Metropolitan Police Commissioner, he maintained a keen interest in military affairs. In 1932, he aroused the Government's displeasure by submitting an unsolicited private paper outlining his idea for the air defence of Singapore in the Straits Settlements. His ideas were rejected, and the Cabinet Secretary, Maurice Hankey, who chaired the Committee of Imperial Defence, was angered by Trenchard's intervention. Later that year, when the Government was considering entering into an international treaty that would have banned all bomber aircraft, Trenchard wrote to the Cabinet outlining his opposition to the idea. Ultimately, the idea was dropped.

Trenchard developed a negative view of Hankey, whom he saw as being more interested in maintaining unanimity among the service heads than dealing with weaknesses in British defence arrangements. He began to speak privately against Hankey who, for his part, had no liking for Trenchard in return. By 1935, Trenchard privately lobbied for Hankey's removal on the grounds that the nation's security was at stake. Following his departure from the Metropolitan Police, he was free to speak publicly. In December 1935 he wrote in The Times that the Committee of Imperial Defence should be placed under the chairmanship of a politician. Hankey responded by accusing Trenchard of "trying to stab him in the back." By 1936 the idea of bolstering the Committee of Imperial Defence had become a popular point of debate and Trenchard presented his arguments in the House of Lords. In the end the Government conceded and Sir Thomas Inskip was appointed as the Minister for Coordination of Defence.

With Hankey and his ban on inter-service disputes gone, the Navy again campaigned for their own air service. The idea of transferring the Fleet Air Arm from Air Ministry to Admiralty control was raised and although Trenchard opposed the move in the Lords, in the Press and in private conversations, he now lacked the influence to prevent the transfer, which took place in 1937. Beyond politics, he took on the Chairmanship of the United Africa Company, with its attendant financial income, which had sought out Trenchard because of his West African knowledge and experience. In 1936 he was upgraded from Baron to Viscount Trenchard.

From late 1936 to 1939 he spent much of his time travelling overseas on behalf of the companies who employed him as a director. During one visit to Germany in the summer of 1937 he was hosted at a dinner by Hermann Göring, the commander-in-chief of Nazi Germany's newly created Luftwaffe. Although the evening started in a cordial fashion, it ended in a confrontation, with Göring announcing that "one day German might will make the whole world tremble". Trenchard replied that Göring "must be off his head". In 1937 Newall was appointed Chief of the Air Staff and Trenchard did not hesitate in criticising him. As an ardent supporter of the bomber, Trenchard found much to disagree with in the air expansion programme, its emphasis on defensive fighter aircraft, and he wrote about it directly to the Cabinet. Trenchard offered his services to the Government on at least two occasions but they were not accepted.

== Second World War ==
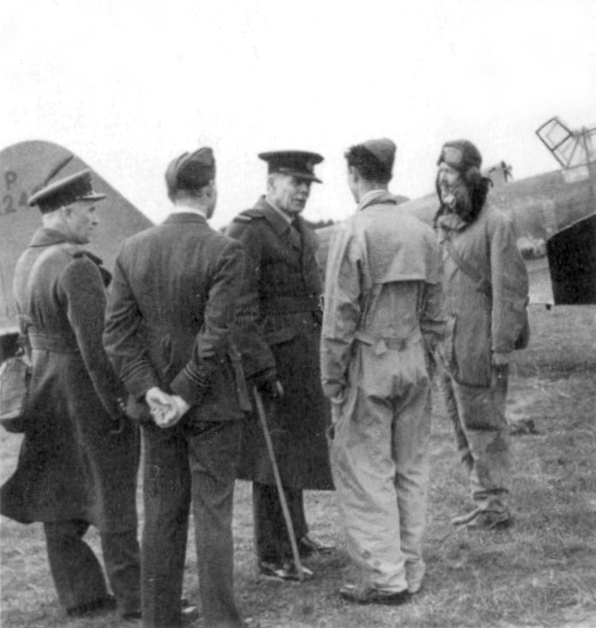
Trenchard with 12 Squadron personnel in France during April 1940.

Just after the outbreak of the Second World War the Prime Minister, Neville Chamberlain, summoned Trenchard and offered him the job of organising advanced training for RAF pilots in Canada, possibly as a pretext to remove Trenchard from England. He turned the post down, saying that the role required a younger man who had up-to-date knowledge of training matters. He then spent the remainder of 1939 arguing that the RAF should be used to strike against Germany from its bases in France. In 1940 he was offered the job of co-ordinating the camouflaging of England, which he flatly refused. Without an official role he took it upon himself to spend the spring of 1940 visiting RAF units, including those of the Advanced Air Striking Force in France. In April, Sir Samuel Hoare, who was again Secretary of State for Air, unsuccessfully attempted to get him to come back as Chief of the Air Staff.

In May 1940, after the failure of the Norwegian campaign, Trenchard used his position in the Lords to attack what he saw as the Government's half-hearted prosecution of the war. When Churchill replaced Chamberlain as Prime Minister, Trenchard was asked to organise the defence of aircraft factories. He declined on the grounds that he was not interested in helping the general who already had the responsibility. Towards the end of the month Churchill offered him a job that would have seen him acting as a general officer commanding all British land, air and sea forces at home should an invasion occur. Trenchard responded by bluntly stating that in order to be effective, the officer with such responsibility would need the military powers of a generalissimo, and political power that would come from being Deputy Minister of Defence. Churchill was amazed at the reply, and refusing to grant Trenchard the enormous powers he sought withdrew the offer of the post.

Notwithstanding their disagreement, Trenchard and Churchill remained on good terms, and on Churchill's 66th birthday (30 November 1940) they took lunch at Chequers. The Battle of Britain had recently concluded and Churchill was full of praise for Trenchard's pre-war efforts in establishing the RAF. Churchill made Trenchard his last job offer, this time as the reorganizer of Military Intelligence. Trenchard seriously considered the offer, but declined it by letter two days later, chiefly because he felt that the job required a degree of tact which he lacked.

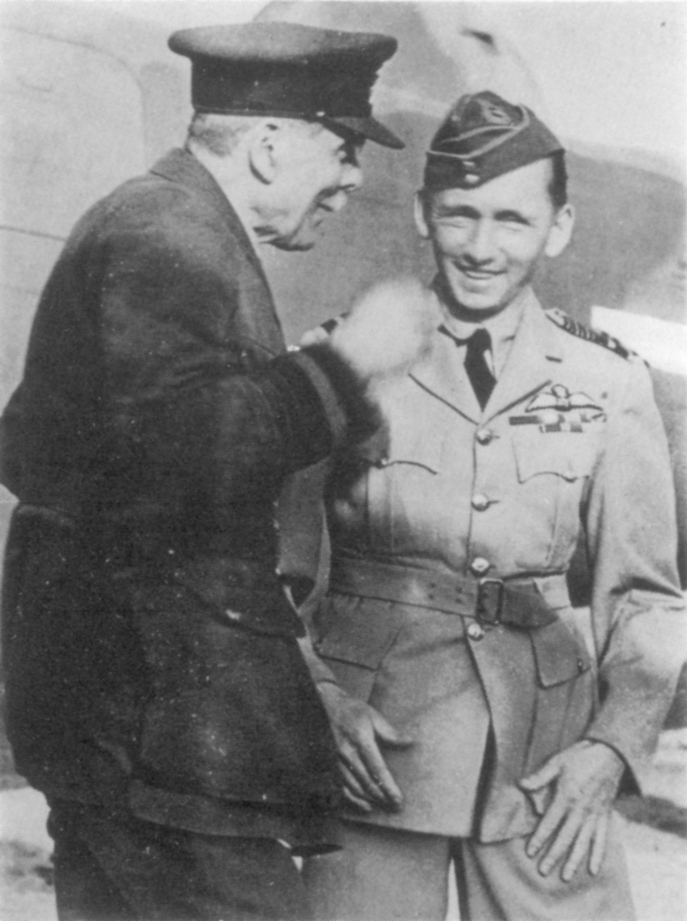
Trenchard speaking informally with Sir Arthur Tedder during the Second World War.

From mid-1940 onwards, Trenchard realised that by his rash demands in May he had excluded himself from a pivotal role in the British war effort. He then took it upon himself to act as an unofficial Inspector-General for the RAF, visiting deployed squadrons across Europe and North Africa on morale-raising visits. As a peer, a friend of Churchill's and with direct connections to the Air Staff, he championed the cause of the Air Force in the House of Lords, in the press and with the government, submitting several secret essays concerning the importance he attached to air power.

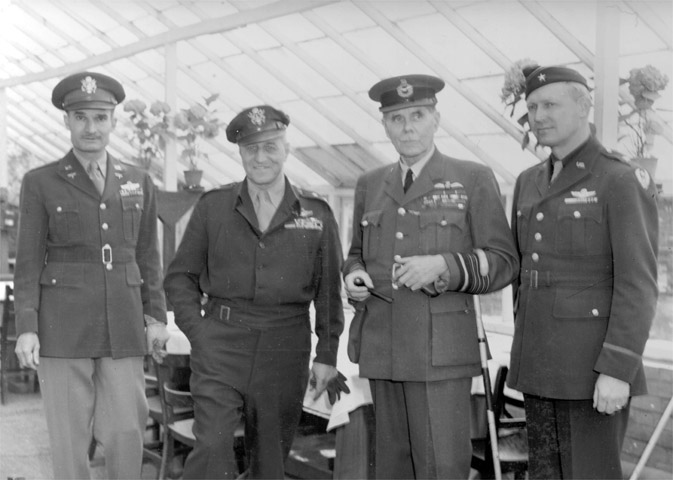
A meeting, less than a month before the Normandy landings, of (from left to right) Brigadier General Richard C. Sanders, CG of the 100th Fighter Wing; Major General Ralph Royce, then deputy chief of staff for the Ninth Air Force; Marshal of the Royal Air Force Lord Trenchard; Brigadier General Otto P. Weyland, CG of the XIX TAC.

He continued to exert considerable influence over the Royal Air Force. Acting with Sir John Salmond he quietly but successfully lobbied for the removal of Newall as Chief of the Air Staff and Dowding as the Command-in-Chief of Fighter Command. In the autumn, Newall was replaced by Portal and Dowding was succeeded by Douglas. Both the new commanders being Trenchard protégés.

During the war, the Trenchard elder stepson, John, was killed in action in Italy, and his younger stepson Edward was killed in a flying accident. His own first-born son, also called Hugh, was killed in North Africa in 1943. However, Trenchard's younger son Thomas survived the war.

== Later years ==
In the aftermath of the war, several American generals, including Henry H. Arnold and Carl Andrew Spaatz, asked Trenchard to brief them in connection with the debate which surrounded the proposed establishment of the independent United States Air Force. The American air leaders held him in high esteem and dubbed him the "patron saint of air power". The United States Air Force was formed as an independent branch of the American Armed Forces in 1947.

After the Second World War, Trenchard continued to set out his ideas about air power. He also supported the creation of two memorials. For the first, the Battle of Britain Chapel in Westminster Abbey, he headed a committee with Air Chief Marshal Sir Hugh Dowding to raise funds for the furnishing of the chapel and for the provision of a stained glass window. The second, the Anglo-American Memorial to the airmen of both nations, was erected in St Paul's Cathedral, after Trenchard's death. In the late 1940s and early 1950s he continued his involvement with the United Africa Company, holding the chairmanship until 1953 when he resigned. He wrote the Introduction to the book Haig, Master of the Field (1953), an apologia for the Earl Haig's conduct of military operations during the First World War, who had come under increasing societal condemnation post-war for the scale of the British Army's casualties, written by General Sir John Davidson, Haig's former Operations Chief. From 1954, during the last two years of his life, Trenchard was partially blind and physically frail.

== Death ==
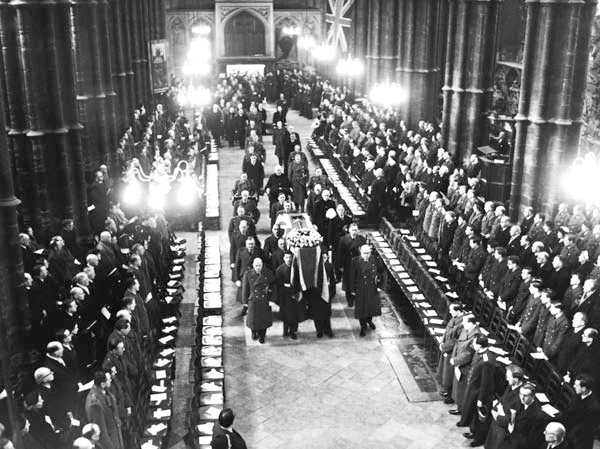
Trenchard's funeral in Westminster Abbey in 1956

Lord Trenchard died at his London home in Sloane Avenue on 10 February 1956, one week after his 83rd birthday. Following his funeral at Westminster Abbey on 21 February, his body was cremated and his ashes were entombed at the Battle of Britain Chapel in the Abbey. Trenchard's viscountcy passed to his son Thomas.

== Legacy ==
Several institutions and buildings are named after him, including the University of Ibadan's Trenchard Hall, and RAF Cranwell's Trenchard Hall. Also named after him are: Trenchard Lines – one of the two sites of British Army Headquarters United Kingdom Field Army, (formerly RAF Upavon) the small museum at RAF Halton, one of the five houses at Welbeck College which are named after prominent military figures, and Trenchard House, which is currently used by Farnborough Air Sciences Trust to store part of their collection. In 1977 Trenchard was invested in the International Aerospace Hall of Fame at the San Diego Aerospace Museum.

Trenchard's work in establishing the RAF and preserving its independence has led to him being called the "Father of the Royal Air Force". For his own part, he disliked the description, believing that General Sir David Henderson deserved the accolade. His obituary in The Times considered that his greatest gift to the RAF was the belief that mastery of the air must be gained and retained through offensive action. During his life, Trenchard strongly argued that the bomber was the key weapon of an air force, and he is recognized today as one of the early advocates of strategic bombing, and one of the architects of the British policy on imperial policing through air control.

In 2018, a permanent memorial to him was commissioned as part of the celebrations for 100 years of the RAF. It was unveiled in Taunton on 14 June by the 3rd Viscount Trenchard next to the town's Northern Inner Distributor Road, which was renamed Trenchard Way at the same time.

== Arms ==
Coat of arms of Hugh Trenchard, 1st Viscount Trenchard
Crest A cubit arm erect, vested azure, cuffed argent, holding in the hand a Cinqueda sword, both proper. Escutcheon Per Pale argent and azure, on the first three pallets sable, all within a bordure of the last. Supporters On either side an eagle close gules, each charged on the neck, the dexter with a thistle slipped and leaved and the sinister with truncheon erect or. Motto Nosce Teipsum (Latin: Know thyself) Orders Knight Grand Cross of the Order of the Bath, Order of Merit (Military Division), and Knight Grand Cross of the Royal Victorian Order.

== See also ==
- List of titles and honours of Hugh Trenchard, 1st Viscount Trenchard

== Footnotes ==
Military offices
Preceded by A F Montanaro	Commandant of the Southern Nigeria Regiment (Acting); 1904–1905	Succeeded by Harry Moorhouse
Preceded by Harry Moorhouse	Commandant of the Southern Nigeria Regiment; 1907–1910	Succeeded by F H Cunliffe
Preceded by Henry Cook	Assistant Commandant of the Central Flying School; 23 September 1913 – 6 August 1914	Succeeded by Tom Webb-Bowen
Preceded by Frederick Sykes	Officer Commanding the Military Wing of the Royal Flying Corps; 7 August 1914 – 19 November 1914	Succeeded by Edward Ashmore; As Officer Commanding the Administrative Wing
Preceded by Frederick Sykes	Officer Commanding the Military Wing of the Royal Flying Corps; 7 August 1914 – 19 November 1914	Succeeded by John Higgins; As Officer Commanding the Training Wing
New title Wing established	Officer Commanding the First Wing of the Royal Flying Corps; 19 November 1914 – 25 August 1915	Succeeded by Edward Ashmore
Preceded by Sir David Henderson	Officer Commanding the Royal Flying Corps in the Field; Became General Officer Commanding from 24 March 1916 (promotion); 25 August 1915 – 3 January 1918	Succeeded by John Salmond
New title Air Council established	Chief of the Air Staff; 18 January – 12 April 1918	Succeeded by Sir Frederick Sykes
New title Created from the VIII Brigade commanded by Cyril Newall	General Officer Commanding the Independent Force; Became commander-in-chief the Inter-Allied Independent Air Force on 26 October; 15 June – 20 November 1918	Succeeded by Christopher Courtney
Preceded by Sir Frederick Sykes	Chief of the Air Staff; 31 March 1919 – 1 January 1930	Succeeded by Sir John Salmond
Honorary titles
Preceded by John Thomas Dalyell	Honorary Colonel of the Royal Scots Fusiliers; 13 July 1919 – 1 May 1946	Succeeded by Edmund Hakewill-Smith
Police appointments
Preceded by The Viscount Byng of Vimy	Commissioner of Police of the Metropolis; 1931–1935	Succeeded by Sir Philip Game
Peerage of the United Kingdom
New creation	Viscount Trenchard; 1936–1956	Succeeded by Thomas Trenchard
New creation	Baron Trenchard; 1930–1956	Succeeded by Thomas Trenchard
Baronetage of the United Kingdom
New creation	Baronet (of Wolfeton); 1919–1956	Succeeded by Thomas Trenchard
