= Thomas Trenchard (disambiguation) =

Thomas Trenchard (1874–1943) was an American football player and coach.

Thomas Trenchard may also refer to:

- Thomas Trenchard (Dorset MP) (1582–1657), English MP for Dorset, 1621, 1645
- Thomas Trenchard (died 1671), English MP for Poole
- Thomas Trenchard (1672–1703), English MP for Dorchester
- Thomas Trenchard, 2nd Viscount Trenchard (1923–1987), British peer and politician
- Thomas Whitaker Trenchard (1863–1942), American lawyer and justice of the New Jersey Supreme Court
