= Hugh Trenchard in Nigeria =

Hugh Trenchard saw service in Nigeria from 1903 to 1910 where he was involved in efforts to bring the interior under settled British rule and quell inter-tribal violence. During his time in West Africa, Trenchard commanded the Southern Nigeria Regiment for several years and was promoted to lieutenant colonel.

== Arrival and first expedition ==
In September 1903, following the Boer War, Major Trenchard was on leave in England and he considered his future options. He was undecided between staying in the Army or taking up gold prospecting in the Transvaal. After a chance meeting with Colonel Gilman, whom the War Office had appointed to recruit officers for the Southern Nigeria Regiment, he opted for remaining in the Army. After an interview in London with General Kemball, Trenchard was granted the position of Deputy Commandant of the Southern Nigeria Regiment with the promise that he was entitled to lead all regimental expeditions.

Trenchard arrived in Nigeria in early December 1903, disembarking at the port of Bonny. He then travelled along the coast by steamer to Calabar, where he reported to the commanding officer, Colonel Montanaro. Montanaro was preparing an expedition to quell inter-tribal violence in the interior. On the day before the expedition was due to depart, Montanaro told Trenchard that he would not be accompanying him as he believed that Trenchard, being unacclimatized, would be a liability in the field. Despite Trenchard's protests, he remained behind. By this time, General Kemball was in the Gold Coast and Trenchard was able to send a wire to Kemball threatening to return to Great Britain. Kemball contacted Sir Ralph Moore, the Governor of Southern Nigeria, who issued instructions for Trenchard to replace Montanaro as leader of the expedition. Trenchard caught up with the expedition several days' march from Itu. After a brief exchange, Trenchard handed Montanaro the text of the governor's wire, which he accepted. After dealing with discontent from some of the regiment's officers, Trenchard led the expedition on towards the disturbed area. Several days later, Trenchard's expedition saw evidence of ritual killings and was then ambushed by Igbo men. After defeating the attackers, Trenchard's men occupied the local village overnight. The next morning the local tribal chief and his men handed in their arms. Trenchard then set about bringing those responsible for the ritual killings to justice and fighting bellicose Igbo men. In time, six more chiefs with a little under 10,000 men surrendered their arms to Trenchard's expedition of around 250 men, who had superior fire power.

== Revolt in German Cameroons and acting Commandant ==
In March 1904, Trenchard headed to the upper Cross River as the tribal revolt in neighbouring German Cameroons was spilling over into Nigerian territory. Trenchard put down the revolt in Aparabong and thousands of men surrendered firearms to his troops.

It was also in 1904 that Trenchard was involved in bringing Igboland under British control. Initially many of the inhabitants refused to surrender weaponry to the British and Trenchard's political advisor, R M Heron, arranged for the destruction of the houses of those who harboured weapons. In light of this policy, many guns and other arms were surrendered to Trenchard's soldiers at Nkwo Nnewi where they were destroyed. During this time the Igbo nicknamed Trenchard Nwangwele, meaning young lizard in Igbo, on account of his figure.

From summer 1904 to the late summer 1905, Trenchard was acting Commandant of the Southern Nigeria Regiment. During his time in command, Trenchard set about bringing firm discipline to what he considered an unruly unit. Gambling was banned, drunkenness and laziness were punished and action was taken against any soldiers caught with local women.

== Bende-Onitsha hinterland expedition ==
With the appointment of a new commanding officer, Trenchard presented his plans for bringing the uncharted region 200 miles (320 km) north-west of Calabar under British control. This region between the Cross and Niger Rivers was around 1,200 square miles (3,100 km^{2}) in area with Bende to the south and Onitsha to the west. It was the largest British expedition in Nigeria to be undertaken since the Aro Expedition in 1901 and 1902.

Early in the so-called Bende-Onitsha hinterland expedition, a British doctor was captured by several Igbo men and then killed and eaten according to Geary (1927). Trenchard's expedition took on a punitive character as he pursued the murderers, eventually fighting a pitched battle with the men and defeating them with the use of his Maxim guns. The chiefs were brought to terms and the doctor's skull and bones recovered. Thousands of Igbo men were pressed into service as labourers, constructing roads through the jungle. His service during the Bende-Onitsha expedition saw Trenchard awarded the Distinguished Service Order in 1906.

== Work in Lagos, Munshi expedition and Commandant ==
Towards the end of Trenchard's 1906 expedition he contracted blackwater fever and was sent back to England on sick leave. On his return to Nigeria, Trenchard spent time completely redeveloping the barracks in Lagos, where the regiment had relocated some months earlier. He also acted as an agent for Harrods, importing goods and undercutting local merchants. From November 1907 to spring 1908, Trenchard led his last expedition, consisting of only four officers, an interpreter, 25 men and three machine guns. During the expedition, Trenchard made contact with the Munshi tribe, sending gifts to their chiefs. Subsequently, roads were built and trade links established with the tribe. He was Commandant with the temporary rank of lieutenant colonel from 1908 onwards.

== Sources ==
- Boyle, Andrew (1962). Trenchard Man of Vision. St James's Place, London: Collins.
- Geary, Sir William Nevill Montgomerie (1965) [First published 1927]. Nigeria under British rule. London: Frank Cass & Co.
- Ijezie, E. O. (1987). "Chieftaincy Institution in Nnewi up to the end of the Colonial Period". Unpublished M.A. Thesis. Nigeria: University of Nigeria.
- Nwokeji, G Ugo (2002). "Politicization of Merchant Capital During Decolonization: European Business in Nigeria, 1948-1951". In Oyebade, Adebayo (ed.). The transformation of Nigeria: essays in honor of Toyin Falola. Trenton, New Jersey and Asmara, Eritrea: Africa World Press. ISBN 0-86543-997-4.
