= R. E. Power =

Rowland Edward Power
- Born: 22 May 1874
- Died: 17 February 1956 (aged 81)
- Military career
- Allegiance: United Kingdom
- Branch: British Army
- Service years: 1893–1927
- Rank: Lieutenant Colonel
- Commands: 1st Battalion, South Nigeria Regiment; 2nd Battalion of the Buffs; 1st Battalion of the Buffs
- Conflicts: Relief of Chitral; North-West Frontier Campaign (1897 and 1898); Aden Hinterland (1902–1904); World War I
- Awards: Distinguished Service Order; Croix de Guerre; Mentioned in Despatches x5

Lieutenant-Colonel Rowland Edward Power DSO (22 May 1874 – 19 February 1956) was in command of the 1st Battalion of the South Nigeria Regiment between 1905 and 1906, the 2nd Battalion of the Buffs during World War I, the 1st Battalion of the Buffs at the end of World War I, and from 1923 until his retirement in 1927, the 1st Battalion of the Buffs in Gibraltar.

For his service in World War I he was awarded the DSO, the Croix de Guerre and was Mentioned in Despatches four times.

== Life ==
Rowland Edward Power was born on 22 May 1874, the son of J. W. Power. He was educated at Bedford Modern School and Sandhurst.

Power joined the Buffs in 1893, at the age of 19, and was posted to the 1st Battalion in India where he saw service in the Relief of Chitral. He was made Second Lieutenant on 21 October 1893, awarded a medal with clasp for his service at Chitral and made Lieutenant on 17 March 1897.

Power served in the North-West Frontier Campaign of 1897 and 1898, during which he was mentioned in despatches and was slightly wounded, shot in his right arm, during an attack on Umra Khan’s village of Zogai. He was made Captain in 1900 and was active in the Aden Hinterland between 1902 and 1904 before taking command of the 1st Battalion of the South Nigeria Regiment. After his service with the South Nigeria Regiment he was attached to the 1st Battalion of the Buffs at Aldershot in 1910.

At the commencement of World War I Power was with the 2nd Battalion of the Buffs in India before his battalion transferred to France in January 1915. He took Command of the 2nd Battalion of the Buffs and saw service at the Second Battle of Ypres that involved the first German poison gas attack on 23 April 1915. Having been promoted major he was in command during the Battle of Gravenstafel. On 3 May 1915, he was shot in the lung while attempting to capture the Germans retreating from the British line.

Power was made acting lieutenant-colonel on 25 March 1917. During World War I, Power was awarded the DSO, the Croix de Guerre and was Mentioned in Despatches four times.

At the end of the War, Power commanded the 1st Battalion in France and Germany. He took the 1st Battalion to Ireland and later to Turkey. In 1923, he took command of the 1st Battalion in Gibraltar and, after four years in command, he retired to Dorset, England, in 1927.

In 1911, Power married Mary Katherine Gardiner, daughter of Lt. Col. W.A. Gardiner. They had two daughters. He died on 19 February 1956.
