= Walter Copland Perry =

Walter Copland Perry (1814 – December 1911) was a noted British author and barrister-at-law.

== Life ==
Perry was the only son of Rev. Isaac Perry, of Liverpool. During the 1830s, he was a doctoral student of the University of Göttingen. Later a student of the Middle Temple, who matriculated 12 January 1847, Perry was called to the bar 31 January 1851. He made a living as a private tutor in Bonn.

== Works ==
Perry published German University Education in 1845. As historian and classicist, he published The Franks, From Their First Appearance in History to the Death of King Pepin (1857), The Women of Homer, Sancta Paula; a Romance of the Fourth Century, A.D. (1902) and Sicily in fable, history, art, and song (1908).

== Family ==
Perry married in 1841 Hepzibah Elizabeth (died 1880), the second daughter of Samuel Shaen of Hatfield Peverel. They had five sons and one daughter. In 1889 he married, as his second wife, Evelyn Stopford (1858—?). Their son, Evelyn Copland Perry (1890 – 1914), a pioneer British aviator was killed on 16 August 1914 while serving with the Royal Flying Corps in France, making him the first British Army officer to die in France during World War I.
