= Evelyn Perry =

- Born: Evelyn Walter Copland Perry; 4 December 1890; Marylebone, London, England, UK
- Died: 16 August 1914 (aged 23); France
- Burial place: St. Acheul Cemetery in Amiens
- Military career
- Branch: Royal Flying Corps
- Rank: Second Lieutenant

Evelyn Walter Copland Perry (4 December 1890 – 16 August 1914) was a pioneer British aviator and one of the first flying instructors in England. He was killed on 16 August 1914 in a flying accident while serving with the Royal Flying Corps in France, making him the first British Army officer to die in France during World War I.

Evelyn Walter Copland Perry was born on 4 December 1890, the son of Walter Copland Perry, the noted author and barrister and his wife Evelyn née Stopford.

On 12 September 1911, Perry gained his Royal Aero Club certificate on the Barber "Valkyrie" and became the 130th person in the United Kingdom to learn to fly. He was then employed as a Royal Aircraft Factory pilot and carried out a considerable amount of flying at Brooklands on a Burgess-Wright. In 1912, he worked with Thomas Sopwith at his flying school at Brooklands, where amongst others he trained Hugh Trenchard.

With the outbreak of World War I, Copland Perry was commissioned as a second lieutenant. He flew to France with the Royal Flying Corps and was killed in a flying accident on 16 August 1914, making him possibly the first officer to die in the Great War. Copland Perry was buried in the St. Acheul Cemetery in Amiens.
