= Minister of State for Defence Readiness and Industry =

Ministerial post in the United Kingdom Ministry of Defence

United Kingdom Minister of State for Defence Readiness and Industry
- Royal Arms of His Majesty's Government

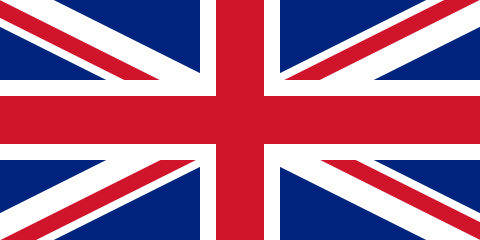

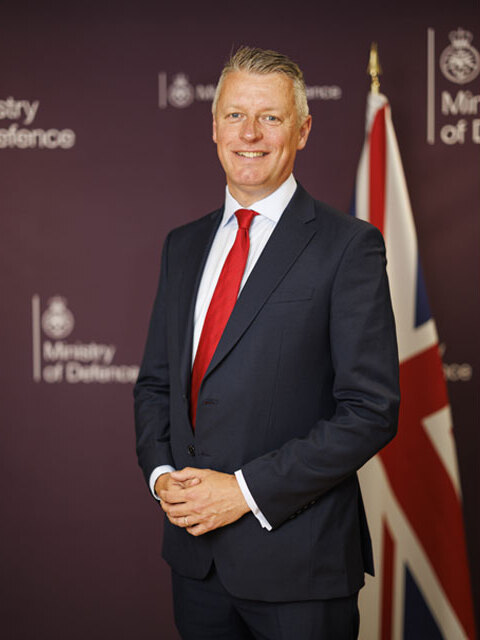
- Incumbent; Luke Pollard since 6 September 2025
- Ministry of Defence
- Style: Minister
- Nominator: Prime Minister of the United Kingdom
- Appointer: The Monarch; on advice of the Prime Minister
- Term length: At His Majesty's pleasure
- First holder: Roy Mason
- Website: Official website

The Minister of State for Defence Readiness and Industry is, as a Minister of State, a mid-level defence minister in the Ministry of Defence of the British Government. The current incumbent of the post, Labour MP Luke Pollard, was appointed in September 2025.

== Origins ==
This ministerial post derives from that of two posts: the procurement aspects of this post were the responsibility of the Minister of Defence Procurement (either a Minister of State or the more junior, Parliamentary Under-Secretary of State), while the defence logistic aspects were the brief of the Minister of State for the Armed Forces.

This post was created in 2007 to reflect the establishment of the Defence Equipment and Support organisation of the UK Ministry of Defence. Lord Drayson was appointed as its first incumbent. Whilst Lord Drayson held the role as a Minister of State, all of his successors were Parliamentary Under-Secretaries, the most junior ministerial rank in the British Government, until the appointment of Jeremy Quin in 2020.

The post was retitled in 2010 as Minister for Defence Equipment, Support and Technology. The current title of the post is unclear as it has been announced as both Minister for Defence Procurement and Minister for Defence Equipment, Technology and Support.

== Responsibilities ==
The Minister is responsible for:

- implementation of relevant SDR Vision and Recommendations
- oversight of the National Armaments Director Group
- departmental communications strategy and reform
- armed forces readiness and stockpiles
- Defence procurement, including reform and UK Defence Innovation
- submarine delivery
- Defence Industrial Strategy: implementation and growth
- Defence Exports Campaign and Office
- Defence Readiness Bill
- Ukraine support - military aid and industrial partnerships, including HIRST and KINDRED
- Defence industry relationships and the Defence Industrial Joint Council
- acquisition reform/UK Defence Innovation
- climate change and sustainability
- Defence estates, accommodation and Defence Infrastructure Organisation
- artificial intelligence and innovation
- science and technology
- Defence Afghanistan Relocation and Assistance Programme (ARAP) including eligibility applications and asylum
- oversight of Parliamentary engagement

== List of ministers ==
=== Ministers of State for Defence for Equipment, 1967–1970 ===
Minister		Entered office	Left office	Political party	
	Roy Mason	7 January 1967	16 April 1968	Labour	
	John Morris	16 April 1968	19 June 1970	Labour	
=== Minister of State for Defence, 1970–1972 ===
Minister		Entered office	Left office	Political party	Prime Minister
	Lord Balniel	23 June 1970	5 November 1972	Conservative	Edward Heath
=== Minister of State for Defence Procurement, 1971–1972 ===
Name	Portrait	Entered office	Left office	Political party	
	Ian Gilmour	7 April 1971	5 November 1972	Conservative	
=== Ministers of State for Defence, 1972–1981 ===
Name	Portrait	Entered office	Left office	Political party	
	Ian Gilmour	5 November 1972	8 January 1974	Conservative	
	George Younger	8 January 1974	4 March 1974	Conservative	
	William Rodgers	4 March 1974	10 September 1976	Labour	
	John Gilbert	10 September 1976	4 May 1979	Labour	
	Euan Howard	6 May 1979	5 January 1981	Conservative	
	The Viscount Trenchard	5 January 1981	29 May 1981	Conservative	
=== Ministers of State for Defence Procurement, 1981–2007 ===
Minister		Entered office	Left office	Political party	Prime Minister
	The Viscount Trenchard	29 May 1981	6 January 1983	Conservative	Margaret Thatcher
	Geoffrey Pattie	6 January 1983	11 September 1984	Conservative	Margaret Thatcher
	Adam Butler	11 September 1984	2 September 1985	Conservative	Margaret Thatcher
	Norman Lamont	2 September 1985	21 May 1986	Conservative	Margaret Thatcher
	David Trefgarne, 2nd Baron Trefgarne	21 May 1986	24 July 1989	Conservative	Margaret Thatcher
	Alan Clark	24 July 1989	14 April 1992	Conservative	Margaret Thatcher
	Alan Clark	24 July 1989	14 April 1992	Conservative	John Major
	Jonathan Aitken	14 April 1992	20 July 1994	Conservative	John Major
	Roger Freeman	20 July 1994	6 July 1995	Conservative	John Major
	James Arbuthnot	6 July 1995	1 May 1997	Conservative	John Major
	John Gilbert, Baron Gilbert	2 May 1997	July 1999	Labour	Tony Blair
	Elizabeth Symons, Baroness Symons of Vernham Dean	July 1999	8 June 2001	Labour	Tony Blair
	William Bach, Baron Bach	8 June 2001	6 May 2005	Labour	Tony Blair
	Paul Drayson, Baron Drayson	6 May 2005	6 March 2007	Labour	Tony Blair
=== Minister of State for Defence Equipment and Support, 2007–2012 ===
Minister		Entered office	Left office	Political party	Prime Minister
	Paul Drayson, Baron Drayson	6 March 2007	7 November 2007	Labour	Tony Blair
	Paul Drayson, Baron Drayson	6 March 2007	7 November 2007	Labour	Gordon Brown
	Ann Taylor, Baroness Taylor of Bolton	7 November 2007	5 October 2008	Labour	Gordon Brown
	Quentin Davies	5 October 2008	12 May 2010	Labour	Gordon Brown
	Peter Luff	9 June 2010	4 September 2012	Conservative	David Cameron
=== Minister of State for Defence Procurement, 2012–2024 ===
Minister		Entered office	Left office	Political party	Prime Minister
	Philip Dunne	4 September 2012	14 July 2016	Conservative	David Cameron
	Harriett Baldwin	18 July 2016	9 January 2018	Conservative	David Cameron
	Harriett Baldwin	18 July 2016	9 January 2018	Conservative	Theresa May
	Guto Bebb	9 January 2018	16 July 2018	Conservative	Theresa May
	Stuart Andrew	19 July 2018	27 July 2019	Conservative	Theresa May
	Anne-Marie Trevelyan	27 July 2019	16 December 2019	Conservative	Boris Johnson
	James Heappey	16 December 2019	13 February 2020	Conservative	Boris Johnson
	Jeremy Quin	13 February 2020	7 September 2022	Conservative	Boris Johnson
	Alec Shelbrooke	7 September 2022	26 October 2022	Conservative	Liz Truss
	Alex Chalk	27 October 2022	21 April 2023	Conservative	Rishi Sunak
	James Cartlidge	21 April 2023	5 July 2024	Conservative	Rishi Sunak
=== Minister of State for Defence Procurement and Industry, 2024–2025 ===
	Maria Eagle	8 July 2024	6 September 2025	Labour	Keir Starmer
=== Minister of State for Defence Readiness and Industry, 2025–present ===
	Luke Pollard	6 September 2025	incumbent	Labour	Keir Starmer; Andy Burnham
