= Henry Trenchard (MP for Poole) =

English politician

Henry Trenchard (c. 1652 – 2 October 1694), of Lytchett Matravers, Dorset, was an English politician.

His brothers John Trenchard and Thomas Trenchard were also MPs.

He was a Member of Parliament (MP) for Poole in March 1679, October 1679, 1681 and 1689.

== See also ==
- Viscount Trenchard
