= RAF Chapel =

Chapel in Westminster Abbey

At the eastern end of Westminster Abbey in the Lady Chapel built by King Henry VII is the RAF Chapel dedicated to the men of the Royal Air Force who died in the Battle of Britain between July and October 1940.

== History ==
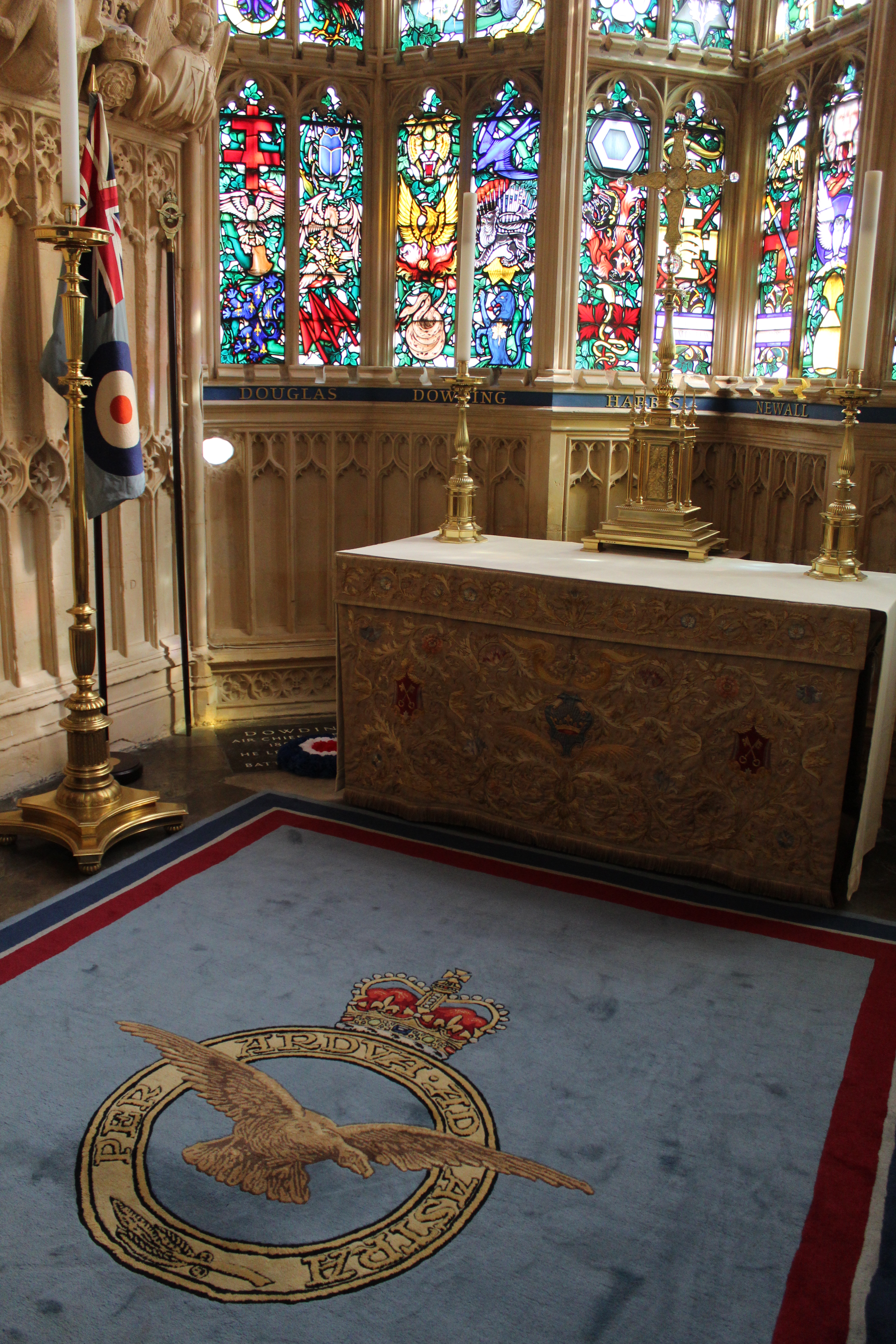
View of altar, and carpet with insignia

What is now the RAF Chapel was the original burial site of Lord Protector Oliver Cromwell in 1658. Cromwell was disinterred in 1661, after the Stuart Restoration, when his corpse was ritually hung from the gallows at Tyburn, where it was finally buried.

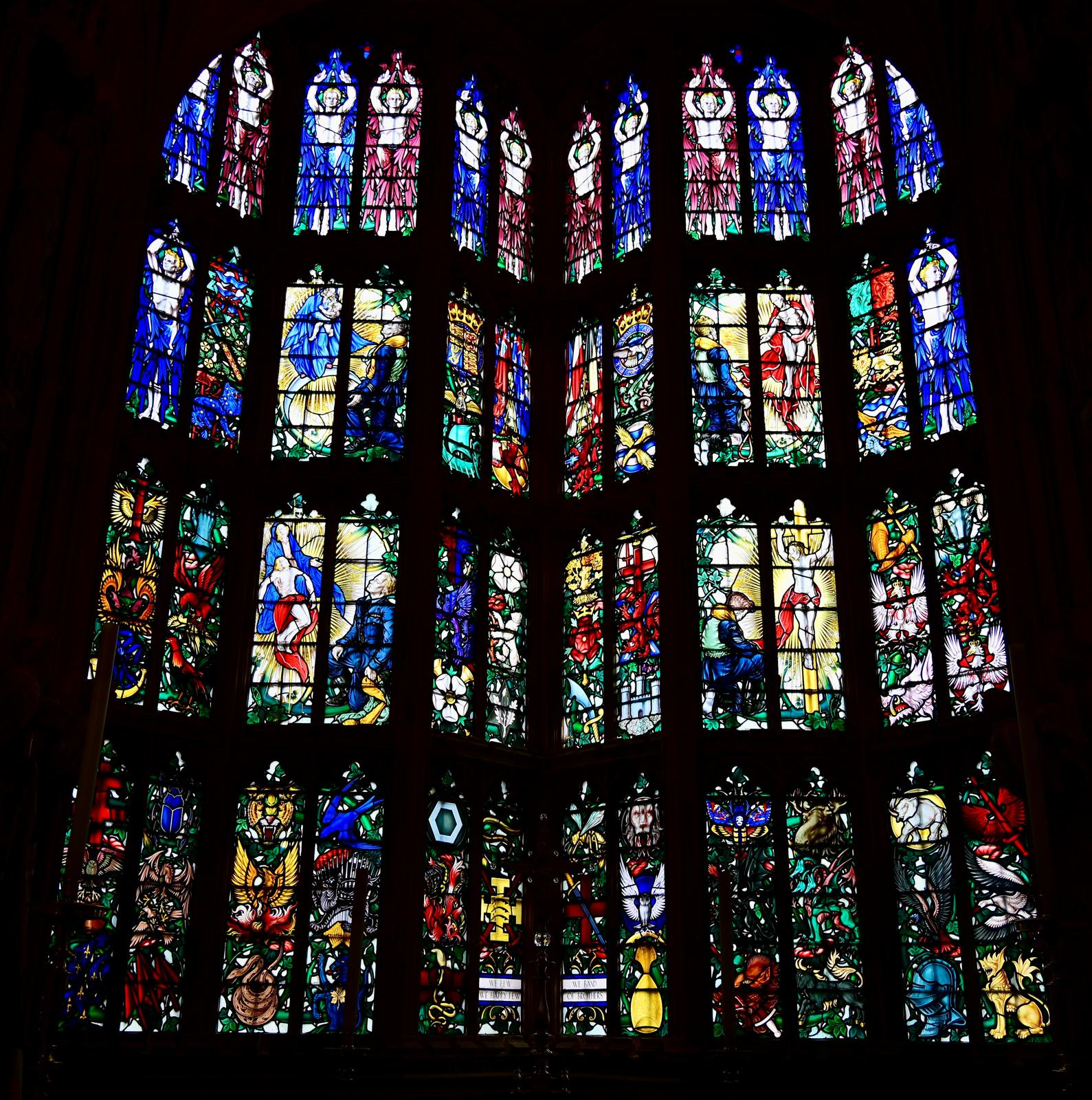
Battle of Britain memorial window by Hugh Easton

The chapel received extensive bomb damage during the Battle of Britain in 1940 and its Tudor glass windows were blown out at the same time. A hole made in the stonework has been preserved and covered with glass. The Dean of Westminster was approached early in 1943 by Mr. N. Viner-Brady who suggested the idea of a memorial to The Few and Dean Labilliere chose a small chapel as suitable for the purpose. Marshal of the Royal Air Force Lord Trenchard and Air Chief Marshal Sir Hugh Dowding headed a committee to raise funds for the furnishing of this chapel and for a stained glass window, the Battle of Britain memorial window, which was unveiled by King George VI on 10 July 1947. It remains the best-known work of the prolific stained glass designer Hugh Easton, whose biographer, Adam Goodyear, notes that the aim for the window was to:

"…create in glass a jewelled curtain of such brilliance as to be a translucent painting, a fresco shot through by flames, taking its place in the richness of the Henry VIl's Chapel. Each light in its own way tells the story of the Battle of Britain, each light has its own meaning, but the whole is subservient to the architectural frame."

Following the chapel's dedication, the Battle of Britain Roll of Honour was placed in the chapel. It contains the names of the 1,497 pilots and aircrew killed or mortally wounded during the Battle of Britain. Illuminated by calligrapher Daisy Alcock, the original work was paid for by Captain Bruce Ingram. It is paraded annually during the Service of Thanksgiving and Rededication on Battle of Britain Sunday.

The ashes of Trenchard (1956) and Dowding (1970) were interred in the chapel. Notable RAF officers buried elsewhere are commemorated by memorials, e.g. "Bomber" Harris, the man who led RAF Bomber Command during much of the Second World War.

A tradition has grown that the remaining Battle of Britain veterans and their families hold their own, private service in the chapel prior to the Service of Thanksgiving and Rededication on Battle of Britain Sunday.

== Service of Thanksgiving and Rededication ==
The annual service on Battle of Britain Sunday is held in Westminster Abbey on the Sunday on or following Battle of Britain Day (15 September), and has taken place annually since 1943; the first service took place in St Paul's Cathedral and since has taken place in the Abbey.

The format of the service has not changed since 1943. The Battle of Britain Roll of Honour is paraded through the abbey. Originally, it was escorted by 12 Battle of Britain veterans; today, the escort is made up of six veterans and six serving Junior Officers in the RAF. The RAF Fighter Command Silk Ensign is also carried through the abbey, borne and escorted by serving Junior RAF Officers from an extant Battle of Britain squadron that is currently operational. The Ensign Bearer always wears the Monypenny Sword, a gift of the widow of Squadron Leader John Blackwell Sinclair Monypenny, who was killed in action in 1940.

The service is a ticket-only event, arranged by the Royal Air Force Ceremonial Office. Notices are placed in The Times and The Daily Telegraph newspapers in June. Applications can be made in writing to SO3 RAF Ceremonial Events at RAF Northolt by former Battle of Britain aircrew, relatives of Battle of Britain aircrew now deceased (either during the war or since), past or present members of the RAF or its reserve forces and members of the public.

== See also ==
- Royal Air Force Chaplains Branch
