= Southern Nigeria Regiment =

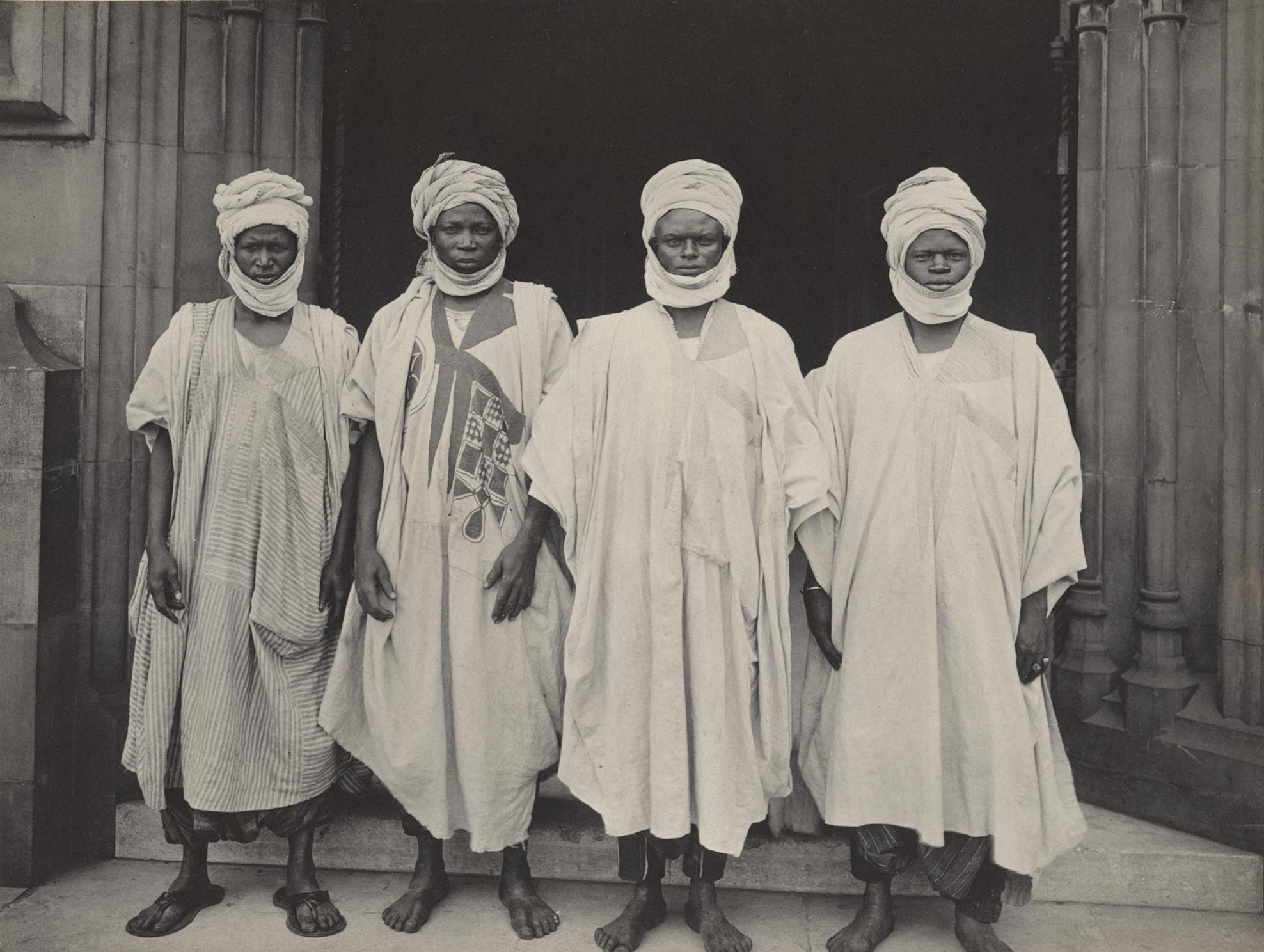
Four Hausa Gun Carriers of the Southern Nigeria Regiment, photographed in London by John Benjamin Stone

The Southern Nigeria Regiment was a British Colonial Auxiliary Forces regiment which operated in Nigeria in the early part of the 20th century.

The Regiment was formed out of the Niger Coast Protectorate Force and part of the Royal Niger Constabulary. The Lagos Battalion or Hausa Force was absorbed into the Regiment in May 1906 and became the Regiment's second battalion.

On 1 January 1914 the Southern Nigeria Regiment's two battalions were merged with those of the Northern Nigeria Regiment to become simply the Nigeria Regiment.

The regiment contributed most of the British troops during the Aro-Anglo war November 1901 to March 1902.

== Commanding officers ==
The following had command of the Regiment:

- 21 September 1896 Captain C H P Carter, Royal Scots (Brevet Major from 1 January 1900)
- 12 February 1901 Brevet Lieutenant-Colonel Arthur Forbes Montanaro, Royal Artillery
- Summer 1904 to summer 1905, Major H M Trenchard (acting)
- 3 August 1905 Brevet Major H C Moorhouse, Royal Artillery
- Spring 1907 to 1910, Lieutenant Colonel H M Trenchard, Royal Scots Fusiliers
- 25 September 1911 Major F H Cunliffe Middlesex Regiment

== See also ==
- Hugh Trenchard in Nigeria
