= Viscount Trenchard =

Viscountcy in the Peerage of the United Kingdom

Viscountcy of Trenchard
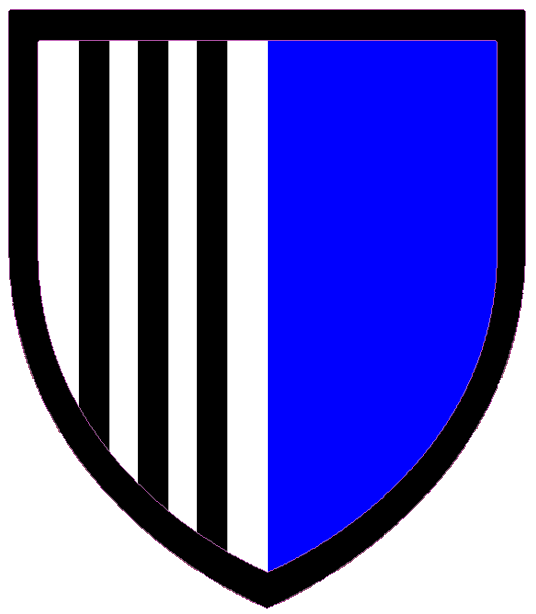
- Arms of Viscount Trenchard: Per pale Argent and Azure in the first three pallets Sable all within a bordure of the last.
- Creation date: 3 February 1936
- Created by: King Edward VIII
- Peerage: Peerage of the United Kingdom
- First holder: Hugh Trenchard, 1st Viscount Trenchard
- Present holder: Hugh Trenchard, 3rd Viscount Trenchard
- Heir apparent: The Hon. Alexander Trenchard
- Remainder to: Heirs male of the first viscount's body, lawfully begotten
- Subsidiary titles: Baron Trenchard; Baronet, of Wolfeton
- Status: Extant
- Seat: Standon Lordship
- Motto: Nosce Teipsum

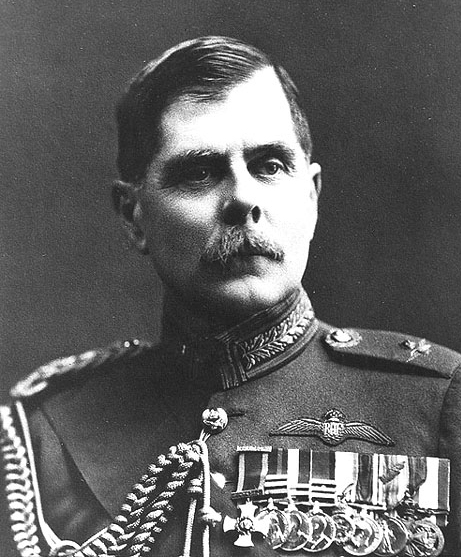
Hugh Trenchard, 1st Viscount Trenchard

Viscount Trenchard, of Wolfeton in the County of Dorset, is a title in the Peerage of the United Kingdom. It was created in 1936 for Marshal of the Royal Air Force The 1st Baron Trenchard. He had already been created a Baronet, of Wolfeton in the County of Dorset, in the Baronetage of the United Kingdom in 1919 and Baron Trenchard, of Wolfeton in the County of Dorset, in 1930, also in the Peerage of the United Kingdom. His second son, the second Viscount, held junior ministerial positions from 1979 to 1983 in the Conservative administration of Margaret Thatcher. As of 2018 the titles are held by the latter's son, the third Viscount, who succeeded in 1987. In 2004 he replaced the recently deceased Lord Vivian as one of the ninety elected (by hereditary peers) hereditary peers that are allowed to remain in the House of Lords after the passing of the House of Lords Act 1999. Lord Trenchard sits on the Conservative benches.

The family seat is Standon Lordship, near Ware, Hertfordshire.

== Viscounts Trenchard (1936) ==
- Hugh Montague Trenchard, 1st Viscount Trenchard (1873–1956)
- Thomas Trenchard, 2nd Viscount Trenchard (1923–1987)
- Hugh Trenchard, 3rd Viscount Trenchard (b. 1951)

The heir apparent is the present holder's son, the Hon. Alexander Thomas Trenchard (b. 1978). He is a former Page of Honour to Elizabeth II and was educated at Eton College and St Hugh's College, Oxford.
The heir apparent's heir apparent is his son, Frederick Hugh Rainer Trenchard (b. 2008)

Coat of arms of Viscount Trenchard
Crest A cubit arm erect vested Azure cuffed Argent holding in the hand a cinquedea sword both Proper. Escutcheon Per pale Argent and Azure in the first three pallets Sable all within a bordure of the last. Supporters On either side an eagle Gules the dexter charged with a thistle leaved and slipped and the sinister with a truncheon Or. Motto Nosce Teipsum
