= Thomas Trenchard (died 1671) =

English politician

Member of Parliament for Poole
- In office 7 November 1670 – 20 November 1671

Personal details
- Born: 1640
- Died: 20 November 1671 (aged 30–31)

Thomas Trenchard (1640 – 20 November 1671) was an English politician who served as Member of Parliament for Poole in Dorset from 1670 to 1671.

== Family ==
His younger brothers were fellow MPs John Trenchard and Henry Trenchard.

== Life ==
He was elected to Parliament in the 1670 general election.

== Death ==
He died on 20 November 1671, and was buried at Charminster.
