= Thomas Trenchard, 2nd Viscount Trenchard =

Junior minister in Margaret Thatcher's conservative government

The Right Honourable The Viscount Trenchard MC
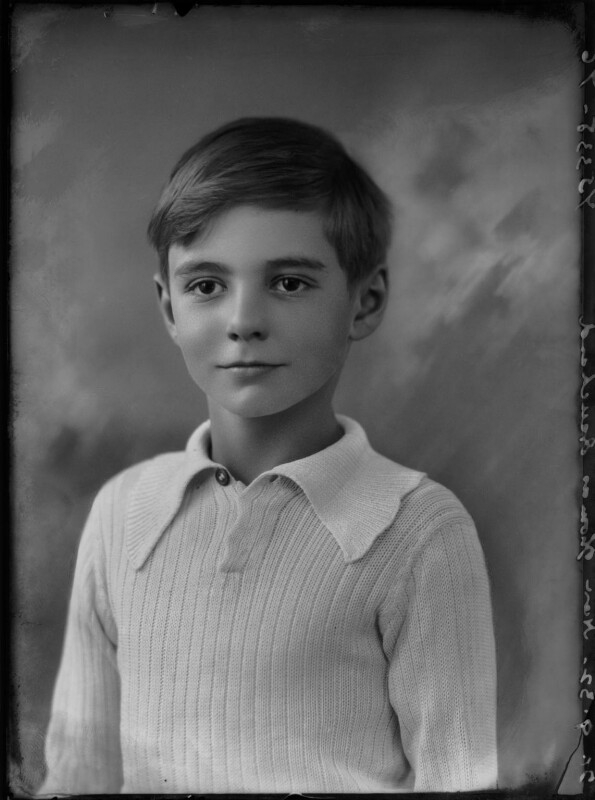
- Trenchard in 1932

Minister of State for Defence Procurement
- In office 5 January 1981 – 6 January 1983
- Prime Minister: Margaret Thatcher
- Preceded by: The Lord Strathcona and Mount Royal
- Succeeded by: Geoffrey Pattie

Minister of State for Industry
- In office 6 May 1979 – 5 January 1981
- Prime Minister: Margaret Thatcher
- Preceded by: Eric Heffer
- Succeeded by: Kenneth Baker

Member of the House of Lords
- Lord Temporal
- In office 10 February 1956 – 29 April 1987
- Preceded by: The 1st Viscount Trenchard
- Succeeded by: The 3rd Viscount Trenchard

Personal details
- Born: Thomas Trenchard; 15 December 1923
- Died: 29 April 1987 (aged 63)
- Party: Conservative
- Spouse: Patricia Bailey (m. 1948)
- Children: 3
- Parent: Hugh Trenchard, 1st Viscount Trenchard
- Education: Eton College

Thomas Trenchard, 2nd Viscount Trenchard, MC (15 December 1923 – 29 April 1987), was a British hereditary peer and junior minister in Margaret Thatcher's Conservative government from 1979 to 1983.

Thomas Trenchard was born in 1923, the son of Katherine and Hugh Trenchard, whom many regard as the father of the Royal Air Force. He was educated at Eton College and served in the King's Royal Rifle Corps in World War II being awarded the MC in 1945.

On 19 June 1948, Thomas Trenchard married Patricia Bailey, the daughter of Admiral Sir Sidney Bailey.

They had three children:

- Hon. Hugh Trenchard (b. 12 March 1951), later 3rd Viscount Trenchard;
- Hon. John Trenchard (b. 13 March 1953) who married Clare Marsh (youngest daughter of Edward Chandos de Burgh Marsh, of The Old Rectory, Salcott, Essex) in 1983, and has issue (one son and one daughter); and
- Hon. Thomas Henry Trenchard (16 July 1966 – 23 February 2003) who married Sarah Saunders in 1997, and had one daughter.

He succeeded his father as Viscount Trenchard on 10 February 1956, and took his seat in the House of Lords on 28 February 1957. He was subsequently a Director of Unilever Ltd and Unilever NV from 1967 to 1977, and served as a Minister of State, Department of Industry from 1979 to 1981 and as Minister for Defence Procurement from 1981 to 1983. After this, he became president of Women and Families for Defence, an anti-CND group.

Lord Trenchard died on 29 April 1987 and was succeeded by his eldest son Hugh. Lady Trenchard died in 2016 at the age of 90. They are buried together in the churchyard at North Mymms, Hertfordshire.

Coat of arms of Thomas Trenchard, 2nd Viscount Trenchard
Crest A cubit arm erect vested Azure cuffed Argent holding in the hand a cinquedea sword both Proper. Escutcheon Per pale Argent and Azure in the first three pallets Sable all within a bordure of the last. Supporters On either side an eagle Gules the dexter charged with a thistle leaved and slipped and the sinister with a truncheon Or. Motto Nosce Teipsum

Peerage of the United Kingdom
Preceded by Hugh Trenchard	Viscount Trenchard; 1956–1987; Member of the House of Lords (1956–1987)	Succeeded by Hugh Trenchard
