= Wolfeton House =

Grade I listed building in Dorset, England

Coordinates: 50.728°N 2.457°W

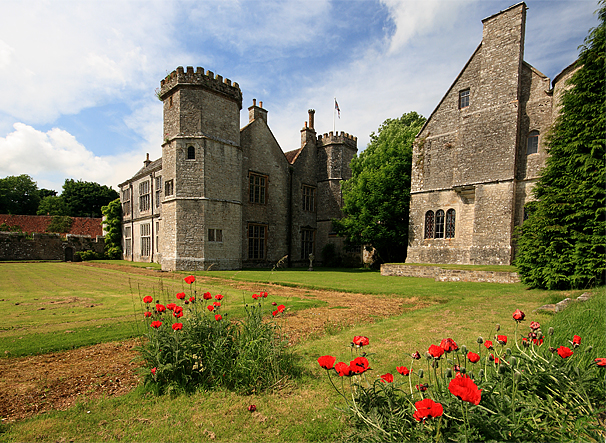
- Wolfeton House from the East

- Location within Dorset
- Location: Dorset
- OS grid reference: SY 67828 92127

Site notes
- Architectural style: Elizabethan architecture

Listed Building – Grade I
- Designated: 20 September 1954
- Reference no.: 1324021

Wolfeton House (sometimes Wolveton House) is an early Tudor and Elizabethan manor house in Dorset, England. It is situated amongst water-meadows north-west of Dorchester not far from the confluence of the rivers Frome and Cerne. It is near to the village of Charminster.

== History ==
The compact original courtyard section of the current building dates back to about 1480. Possibly dating back to Roman times, the house has been the country seat of several families, including the Mohuns and Trenchards. The surviving building was built by the Trenchard family, one of the most prominent families in Dorset during the 16th century.

In January 1506 Sir Thomas Trenchard entertained in Wolfeton/Wolveton Philip of Austria, Archduke of Austria, King of Castile, and his wife Queen Joanna of Castile, after their ship, en route to Spain, was brought to English shores at Melcombe Regis by storm, close to Wolfeton. Concerning this chance event, the famous story about John Russell, 1st Earl of Bedford, who having been born the son of a Weymouth wine importer, became a favoured courtier of King Henry VIII, is told by the Dorset historian John Hutchins (d.1773) as follows: In this house John Russell of Berwick (Dorset), Esq, laid the foundation of the honours and fortunes of the illustrious family of the Duke of Bedford. Having resided some years in Spain, he was sent for by his relation Sir Thomas Trenchard to attend and entertain the Archduke of Austria, King of Castile, who recommended him to the favour of King Henry VII who took him into favour and appointed him one of the gentlemen of his privy chamber and afterwards recommended him to his son Henry VIII.

In June 2023, planning permission to build housing near the manor was refused by Dorset Council.

== Building ==
Parts of Wolfeton House date back to the south side of an early quadrangular courtyard house, dating from the 16th century. The house has a three floored tower on the south side, with the topmost stage build in approximately 1862. West of the tower the wall was built in 16th century and leads to the octagonal garderobe tower.

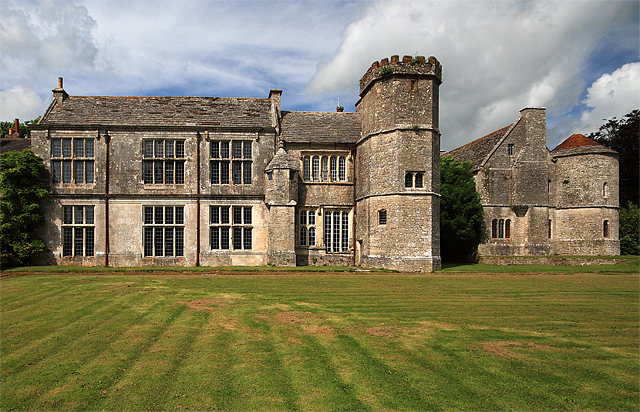
The south front of Wolfeton House

Inside the house is oak panelled and includes an extensive collection of Elizabethan and Jacobean carvings, including those of Roman Soldiers and a figure of a Briton brandishing a club. The main staircase of stone is believed to be unique, built in 1580 with carved figures in the balustrade. The Great Chamber's floor is original and dates to the 16th century, whilst the fireplace is carved with figures including a Native American.

== Gatehouse ==
The gatehouse at Wolfeton House includes an inscription panel stating it was finished in 1534. The gatehouse is 2 storeys high with an attic and was built approximately 30 metres (98 ft) east of the main building. It has two round towers which are not identical in size, with an entrance archway between, but off-centre. Around the door is a label mould, with two stops, showing a satyr and a woodmouse each holding staves. Above the door is cartouche dating from the early 18th century. It is available for holidays through the Landmark Trust.

== Film location ==
The estate was used for filming some scenes of Princess Mary’s melancholy home for Wolf Hall: The Mirror and the Light as the site of Princess Mary’s melancholy home. In a PBS newsletter, locations manager, Rebecca Pearson provided this comment: the site “works atmospherically because the whole place is falling apart. There’s plaster falling off the walls ... the torn tapestries and broken windows convey the feeling of someone basically imprisoned there.”
