= Harry Moorhouse =

Harry Claude Moorhouse
- Born: 30 January 1872; Manchester, England
- Died: 16 December 1934 (aged 62)
- Military career
- Allegiance: United Kingdom
- Branch: British Army
- Rank: Lieutenant-Colonel
- Conflicts: Anglo-Aro War; Kano-Sokoto Expedition; First World War
- Awards: Knight Bachelor; Companion of the Order of St Michael and St George; Distinguished Service Order; Mentioned in Despatches; Officer of the Legion of Honour (France)

Lieutenant-Colonel Sir Harry Claude Moorhouse, CMG, DSO (30 January 1872 – 16 December 1934) was an officer in the British Army who saw action in West Africa. After retiring from the army, Moorhouse served as Chief Assistant to the Colonial Secretary and later as Provincial Commissioner in Nigeria. During the First World War he returned to service with the army. He also played first-class cricket for the Marylebone Cricket Club during the first decade of the 20th century.

== Army career ==
Moorhouse joined the Royal Garrison Artillery as a second lieutenant on 4 November 1891, and was promoted to lieutenant on 4 November 1894. He saw service in Uganda in 1898, was promoted to captain (supernumerary) on 25 November 1899, and was in Ghana in 1900. The following year he was Chief Transport Officer to the British troops in the Aro-Anglo war in Southern Nigeria (November 1901 to March 1902), for which he was mentioned in despatches, and received a brevet promotion as major dated 17 April 1902. He received a regular commission as captain in the Royal Garrison Artillery in May 1902, but was again seconded to serve in Nigeria in September 1902. He took part in the Kano-Sokoto expedition (1903) and the Onitsha hinterland expedition (1904–05), and was awarded the Distinguished Service Order (DSO) and appointed a Companion of the Order of St Michael and St George (CMG) and was mentioned in despatches on several occasions. During the First World War he served at Gallipoli.

== Colonial career ==
He was Lieutenant-Governor of Nigeria from 1921 to 1925 and served as special commissioner to the Solomon Islands from 1928. He was knighted in the 1925 Birthday Honours.
