= Hugh Trenchard, 3rd Viscount Trenchard =

British businessman and politician (born 1951)

The Right Honourable The Viscount Trenchard DL
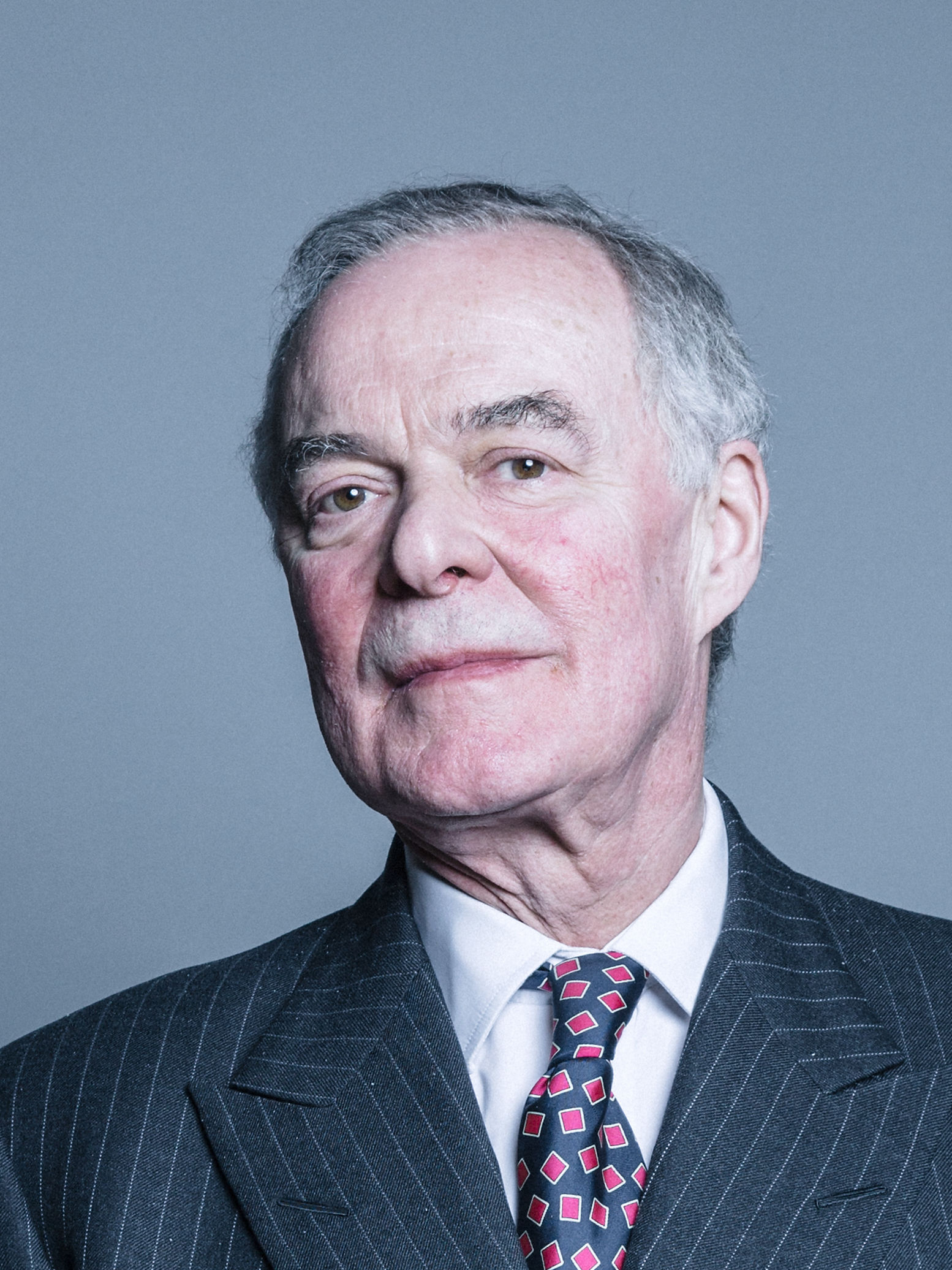

Member of the House of Lords
- Lord Temporal
- Hereditary peerage 1 December 1987 – 11 November 1999
- Preceded by: The 2nd Viscount Trenchard
- Succeeded by: Seat abolished
- Elected Hereditary Peer; 17 May 2004 – 29 April 2026
- By-election: 13 May 2004
- Preceded by: The 6th Baron Vivian
- Succeeded by: Seat abolished

Personal details
- Born: 12 March 1951 (age 75) London
- Party: Conservative
- Spouse: Fiona Elizabeth Morrison (m. 1975)
- Children: 3
- Parent(s): Thomas Trenchard, 2nd Viscount Trenchard; Patricia Bailey
- Education: Trinity College, Cambridge

Hugh Trenchard, 3rd Viscount Trenchard, DL (born 12 March 1951), is a British soldier, businessman, and politician. In 1987, he succeeded to his father's titles. He was one of the ninety hereditary peers in the House of Lords, elected to sit after the passing of the House of Lords Act 1999, sitting as a Conservative.

== Background ==
The son of the 2nd Viscount Trenchard and Patricia Bailey, he was educated at Eton College in Berkshire and at Trinity College, Cambridge, where he graduated with a Bachelor of Arts in 1973. Trenchard served in the 4th Battalion, The Royal Green Jackets from 1972 to 1980, reaching the rank of Captain. In 2006, he became Honorary Air Commodore of 600 (City of London) Squadron, Royal Auxiliary Air Force. He is a Deputy Lieutenant of Hertfordshire since 2006, and a Lieutenant of the City of London since 2016. He was appointed Senior Adviser to Her Majesty's Government on Japanese Financial Services in 2018.

== Career ==
Trenchard worked for Kleinwort Benson from 1973 to 1996, as chief representative in Japan between 1980 and 1985, and as director between 1986 and 1996. For Kleinwort Benson International, he was general manager of its Tokyo branch from 1985 to 1988, president from 1988 to 1995 and deputy chairman from 1995 to 1996. He was director of Dover Japan Inc from 1985 to 1987, of ACP Holdings Ltd from 1990 to 1994, of the Japan Securities Dealers' Association as well as of Bond Underwriters' Association of Japan from 1994 to 1995. For the European Business Community in Japan, he was chairman of the securities committee between 1993 and 1995 and vice-chairman of its council in 1995.

Trenchard was director of Robert Fleming & Co. from 1996 to 1998, and of Robert Fleming International from 1998 to 2000. He was director of Berkeley Technology Limited (the former London Pacific Group Limited) from 1999 to 2010. He was Managing Director, Investment Banking, for Mizuho International plc from 2007 to 2012 and Senior Advisor to Mizuho Bank, Ltd from 2013 to 2014. He was further director of AC European Finance Limited from 2001 to 2003 and of Dryden Wealth Management Limited from 2004 to 2005.

Trenchard was also chairman of The Dejima Fund Ltd from 2001 to 2009, from 2002 to 2008 senior advisor of Prudential Financial, and from January to December 2006 director general of the European Fund and Asset Management Association. He has been chairman of Stratton Street PCC Ltd since 2006, a director of Lotte Chemical UK Ltd since 2010 and a director of Adamas Finance Asia Ltd since 2017. He was a consultant to Optum Health Solutions UK Ltd from 2014 to 2018 and a consultant to Japan Bank for International Cooperation since 2017.

For the Royal Air Force Benevolent Fund, Trenchard was member of council and trustee from 1991 to 2003 and again from 2006 to 2013. He was also chairman from 2006 to 2013 and is deputy chairman since 2014. He was member of council of The Japan Society from 1992 to 1993 and from 1995 to 2004. From 1996 to 2000, he was its vice-chairman and from 2000 to 2004 its joint chairman. Between 1987 and 1995, he was also member of the Japan Association of Corporate Executives.

== Family ==
Since 1975, he has been married to Fiona Elizabeth Morrison, daughter of the 2nd Baron Margadale. They have two sons, including his heir Alexander Thomas Trenchard, and two daughters. Lady Trenchard served as High Sheriff of Hertfordshire 2013–2014.

== Arms ==
Coat of arms of Hugh Trenchard, 3rd Viscount Trenchard
Coronet A Coronet of a Viscount Crest A Cubit Arm erect vested Azure cuffed Argent holding in the hand a Cinqueda Sword both proper Escutcheon Per pale Argent and Azure on the first three Pallets Sable all within a Bordure of the last Supporters On either side an Eagle close Gules each charged on the neck the dexter with a Thistle slipped and leaved and the sinister with a Truncheon erect Or Motto Nosce Teipsum (Know thyself)

== Notes ==
Peerage of the United Kingdom
Preceded by Thomas Trenchard	Viscount Trenchard; 1987–present Member of the House of Lords (1987–1999)	Incumbent; Heir apparent: Hon. Alexander Trenchard
Parliament of the United Kingdom
Preceded by The Lord Vivian	Elected hereditary peer to the House of Lords under the House of Lords Act 1999; 2004–2026	Position abolished under the House of Lords (Hereditary Peers) Act 2026
