= Judiciary of New Zealand =

National court system

The judiciary of New Zealand is responsible for the system of courts that interprets and applies the laws of New Zealand. It has four primary functions: to provide a mechanism for dispute resolution; to deliver authoritative rulings on the meaning and application of legislation; to develop case law; and to uphold the rule of law, personal liberty and human rights. The judiciary is supported in its work by an executive department, the Ministry of Justice.

The court system has four levels: the six-member Supreme Court is the highest court; the ten-member Court of Appeal hears appeals from the High Court on points of law; the High Court deals with serious criminal offences and civil matters, and hears appeals from the lower courts; and the District Court, which sits in fifty-eight locations. There is also a separate Māori Land Court and Māori Appellate Court which have jurisdiction over Māori land cases under the Te Ture Whenua Maori Act 1993.

== Court hierarchy ==
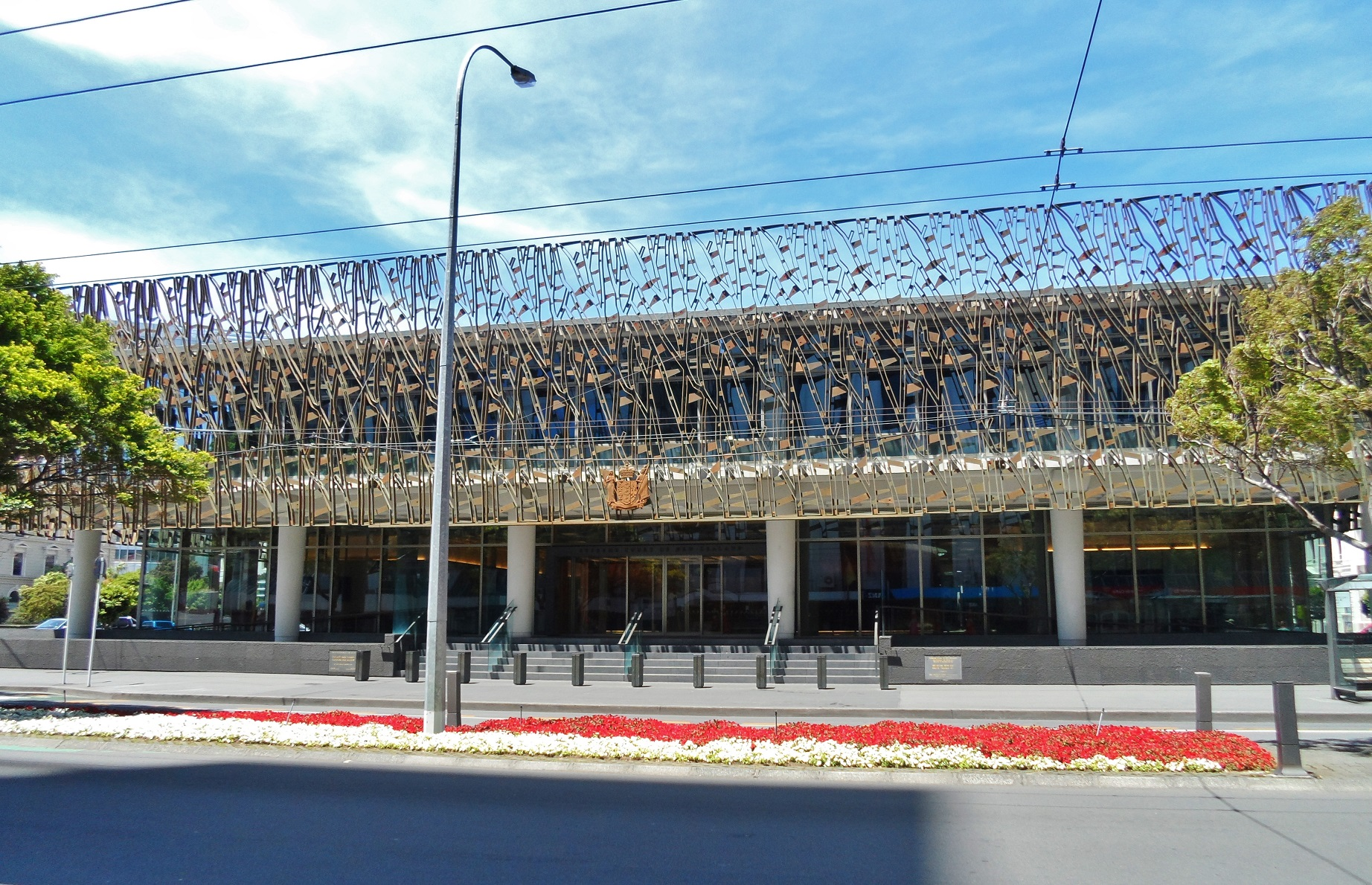
The Supreme Court building in Wellington

The Supreme Court sits at the apex of the New Zealand court hierarchy as the final appellate court. Appeals are only heard by the Supreme Court if it grants leave (permission) to appeal. It can only grant leave if it is necessary in the interests of justice for the court to hear and determine the appeal, meaning:

- the appeal involves a matter of general or public importance (for example, relating to the Treaty of Waitangi); or
- a substantial miscarriage of justice may have occurred; or
- the appeal involves a matter of general commercial significance.

The chief justice presides over the Supreme Court and is described in the Senior Courts Act 2016 as "senior to all other judges". Before the Supreme Court first sat in 2004, the Privy Council in London served as the highest court for New Zealand civil and criminal cases.

The Court of Appeal is an intermediate appellate court which is subordinate to the Supreme Court. The High Court is the highest court of first instance, primarily hearing: serious criminal cases with longer maximum sentences (such as for murder, manslaughter and treason); civil disputes relating to land; disputes relating to equity, wills and trusts, and intellectual property rights where the High Court is specifically referred to in the statute (patents and trade marks); and civil cases where the amount in dispute exceeds the jurisdiction of the District Court (up to $350,000). It is also an appellate court for appeals from inferior courts and tribunals.

The High Court has a commercial court aspect through the High Court Commercial Panels, which "cover high-value disputes (over $2 million), complex and difficult matters of commercial law as well as proceedings brought by public authorities to enforce regulatory standards of commercial behaviour." In Auckland, commercial cases may be eligible for inclusion in the Commercial List, which involves regular court conferences in person and an expectation of cooperation by counsel in return for close case management and expedited substantive hearings.

The District Court hears more than 95% of all criminal trials. The Family Court and Youth Court are specialist divisions of District Court, dealing with families and young people, respectively. Other specialist courts include: the Employment Court; the Environment Court; the Māori Land Court; the Māori Appellate Court; and disputes tribunals, which are small claims courts. The Waitangi Tribunal is a permanent commission of inquiry established under the Treaty of Waitangi Act 1975.

Supreme Court
Court of Appeal
Employment Court	High Court	Māori Appellate Court
District Court (incl. Youth Court and Family Court)	Environment Court	Māori Land Court
Tribunals and authorities

== Law ==
New Zealand applies the common law legal system, where the decisions of higher courts constitute binding precedent upon courts of lower status within their jurisdiction, as distinct from legal systems in the civil law tradition.

The laws of New Zealand are based on the following:

- Statutes of the New Zealand Parliament, including some older statutes of the British Parliament (notably the Bill of Rights 1689).
- Decisions of the New Zealand courts, including decisions on appeals to the Privy Council from New Zealand cases.
- Tikanga Māori, or Māori customary law.

The laws are based on three related principles: parliamentary sovereignty, the rule of law, and the separation of powers. In interpreting common law, New Zealand judges historically followed British decisions, despite not being bound by them. More recently, Australian case law has become cited more frequently but in a manner that recognises decisions from that jurisdiction as being of persuasive precedent value.

== Judges ==
The chief justice is formally appointed by the governor-general on the recommendation of the prime minister. The judges of the Māori Land Court are appointed by the governor-general on the recommendation of the minister for Māori Development. All other superior court judges are appointed by the governor-general on the advice of the attorney-general, the chief justice, and the solicitor-general collectively.

Judges and judicial officers are appointed non-politically and under strict rules regarding tenure to help maintain judicial independence from the executive government. Judges are appointed according to their qualifications, personal qualities, and relevant experience. New Zealand does not have a judicial appointments commission as in many other democracies. As for removal from the bench, judges have only rarely been removed from the bench in New Zealand. A judge may not be removed from office except by the attorney-general upon an address of the House of Representatives (Parliament) for proved misbehaviour.

Judges of the Supreme Court, Court of Appeal and High Court are titled "Justice", while those of lower courts and Associate Judges of the High Court are titled "Judge". The title "Justice" is abbreviated, however "Judge" is not. For example, a judge of the High Court would be referred to as Venning J, whereas a judge of the District Court would be referred to as Judge Neave. Judges in New Zealand are addressed as "Your Honour" or "Sir/Madam"; in social settings, they may be addressed simply as "Judge".

As with other courts in the Commonwealth tradition, New Zealand judges do not use gavels. Instead, judges raise their voice (or stand up if necessary) to restore order in the courtroom.

== Languages used in court ==
English is the main working language of the judiciary and courts. Parties have the right to use any official language of New Zealand (English, Te Reo Māori and New Zealand Sign Language) in any pleading or process in or issuing from a court, and are entitled to a Māori or NZSL interpreter at no cost. Any party wishing to use Māori or NZSL when participating in a hearing must notify the court 10 working days in advance to ensure an interpreter is available, otherwise the court will be adjourned until an interpreter can be made available and the party may be liable for costs of the adjournment and delay.

== History ==
A Supreme Court was first established in 1841 followed by various lower courts including District Courts and Magistrates' Courts, with the latter coming into being in 1846. The Court of Appeal was set up in 1862 as the highest court in New Zealand, but consisted of panels of judges from the Supreme Court. Appeals could be taken from the Court of Appeal to the Privy Council. The District Courts were abolished in 1925 but later re-established. In 1957 the Court of Appeal was fully separated from the Supreme Court, by having its own judges.

The Native Land Court was established in 1865 under the Native Lands Act, to define the land rights of Māori people under Māori custom and to translate those rights or customary titles into titles recognisable under European law. The court was criticised for enabling the removal of Māori from their land, partly due to holding proceedings in English and in cities far from Māori settlements, judges with inadequate knowledge of Māori custom, and partly due to the laws it enforced. Land law did not recognise that land was owned communally by hapū (clans), and land ownership was put in the hands of a few people. In 1954 it was renamed the Māori Land Court. In the 1980s the judiciary played a major role in redefining and elevating the constitutional position of the Treaty of Waitangi.

In 1980, the Supreme Court was renamed the High Court (as it called today), reflecting its intermediate role. In October 2003, Parliament passed the Supreme Court Act 2003, establishing a new Supreme Court of New Zealand in Wellington in July 2004, and simultaneously ending the right of appeal to the Privy Council. The Privy Council dealt with only a small number of appeals annually and was shared with some other Commonwealth nations; the Supreme Court allows for a quicker appeals process as more cases are heard. In October 2016, the Senior Courts Act consolidated in a single statute the Judicature Act of 1908 and the Supreme Court Act, which were repealed.

== Indigenous courts ==
In Australia, Canada, New Zealand, and the United States, Indigenous peoples are over-represented in the prison population. There have been calls to increase measures to reduce the level of incarceration in New Zealand, based on principles of therapeutic jurisprudence and restorative justice, and similar to specialist courts and processes for Indigenous peoples in Canada and Australia.

Te Kōti Rangatahi is an Indigenous court for young Māori people, based on the marae, and has shown some success. Māori culture (tikanga Māori) and community members are integrated with the existing judicial process, to help young offenders connect with their culture.

Te Kōti Matariki, the Matariki Court, is an Indigenous court for adults within a mainstream court system, under the District Court of New Zealand and operating under the Sentencing Act 2002. Based in Kaikohe, Northland Region, this court incorporates Māori customs and culture. Some of these differences from mainstream courts include including the offender's family in court proceedings; seating the offender at the same level as the judge and prosecutor; and a Kaumātua (elder) helps to determine the court proceedings, which begin with welcome speeches. By incorporating tikanga, more information is forthcoming from family members, with the collective knowledge of an offender's whānau (extended family) providing far more information than in formal court proceedings. The offender’s iwi (nation), hapū (clan) and whānau may all help to create an appropriate rehabilitation program for the offender, which, upon successful completion, will be taken into account in the final sentence. A 2011 article by Joanna Hess suggested that New Zealand should adopt some of the practices of Australian Indigenous courts, in particular the Koori Court in the state of Victoria, which has Indigenous sentencing courts as a separate division of the local court system.

== See also ==
- Judicial review in New Zealand
- Law enforcement in New Zealand
- Sheriffs in New Zealand
- Constitution of New Zealand
- Ministry of Justice (New Zealand)
- Politics of New Zealand
