= Imperial Laws Application Act 1988 =

Part of New Zealand's uncodified constitution

New Zealand Parliament
- Long title: An Act to specify the extent to which Imperial enactments, Imperial subordinate legislation, and the common law of England are part of the laws of New Zealand
- Passed: 28 July 1988
- Status: Amended

The Imperial Laws Application Act 1988 is an important part of New Zealand's uncodified constitution. The Act applies certain enactments of the Parliament of the United Kingdom and its predecessors, rulings of the Judicial Committee of the Privy Council and English common law into New Zealand law.

== Background ==
The 2nd New Zealand Parliament passed the English Laws Act 1858, which affirmed the application of statutes of the Parliament of the United Kingdom and its predecessors to New Zealand law.

== Key provisions ==
The Act provides that after its commencement, no Imperial enactments or subordinate legislation not listed in the Schedules of the Act are part of New Zealand law.

The First and Second Schedules to the Act lists the Imperial Acts which are part of New Zealand law. The Act also provides that the common law of England (including the principles and rules of equity), so far as it was part of the laws of New Zealand immediately before the commencement of the Act, continue to be part of the laws of New Zealand. These Acts include:

=== Constitutional laws ===
- A part of Statute of Westminster 1275 (titled Peace of the Church and the Realm Act 1275 in the United Kingdom)
- Magna Carta (only the preamble and Chapter 29 apply)
- Part of the Six Statutes involving due process, including Statute the Fifth (1351) and Liberty of Subject (1354).
- Habeas Corpus Acts of 1640, 1679 and 1816 (Note: Later repealed by the Habeas Corpus Act 2001.)
- Act of Settlement 1701
- Bill of Rights 1688
- Petition of Right 1628

=== Other laws ===
- Calendar (New Style) Act 1750
- Wills Act 1837, for persons who died before 1 November 2007. (Note: Amended by the Wills Act 2007.)

The Act gives the Governor-General in Council the power to make subordinate legislation under Imperial enactments which are part of the Act.

== See also ==
- Constitution of New Zealand
- Independence of New Zealand
