= Habeas Corpus Act 1679 =

Act of the Parliament of England

Habeas Corpus Act 1679 (Note: The citation of this act by this short title was authorised by section 1 of, and the first schedule to, the Short Titles Act 1896. Due to the repeal of those provisions it is now authorised by section 19(2) of the Interpretation Act 1978.)
- Act of Parliament
- Parliament of England
- Long title: An Act for the better securing the Liberty of the Subject and for Prevention of Imprisonments beyond the Seas.
- Citation: 31 Cha. 2. c. 2
- Territorial extent: England and Wales

Dates
- Royal assent: 27 May 1679
- Commencement: 6 March 1679 (Note: Start of Session.)
Other legislation
Amends	Habeas Corpus Act 1640
Amended by	Statute Law Revision Act 1863; Statute Law Revision Act 1888; Public Authorities Protection Act 1893; Supreme Court of Judicature (Consolidation) Act 1925; Statute Law Revision Act 1948; Criminal Law Act 1967; Decimal Currency Act 1969; Courts Act 1971; Bail Act 1976; Criminal Justice and Public Order Act 1994; Constitutional Reform Act 2005
Relates to	Habeas Corpus Act 1816

Status: Amended

Text of statute as originally enacted

Revised text of statute as amended

Text of the Habeas Corpus Act 1679 as in force today (including any amendments) within the United Kingdom, from legislation.gov.uk.

The Habeas Corpus Act 1679 (31 Cha. 2. c. 2) is an act of the Parliament of England passed during the reign of Charles II. It was passed by what became known as the Habeas Corpus Parliament to define and strengthen the ancient prerogative writ of habeas corpus, which required a court to examine the lawfulness of a prisoner's detention and thus prevent unlawful or arbitrary imprisonment.

== Earlier and subsequent history ==
The act is often wrongly described as the origin of the writ of habeas corpus. But the writ of habeas corpus had existed in various forms in England for at least five centuries before and is thought to have originated in the Assize of Clarendon of 1166. It was guaranteed, but not created, by Magna Carta in 1215, whose article 39 reads (translated from Latin): "No freeman shall be taken or imprisoned or disseised or exiled or in any way destroyed, nor will we go upon him nor will we send upon him except upon the lawful judgement of his peers or the law of the land." The 1679 act followed an earlier Habeas Corpus Act 1640 (16 Cha. 1. c. 10), which established that the command of the king or the Privy Council was no answer to a petition of habeas corpus. Further Habeas Corpus Acts, including the Habeas Corpus Act 1803 (43 Geo. 3. c. 140), the Habeas Corpus Act 1804 (44 Geo. 3. c. 102), Habeas Corpus Act 1816 (56 Geo. 3. c. 100), the Habeas Corpus Act 1862 (25 & 26 Vict. c. 20), but it is the 1679 act which is remembered as one of the most important statutes in English constitutional history. Though amended, it remains on the statute book to this day.

== Content ==
In criminal matters other than treason and felonies, (Note: That is, misdemeanours. No such distinction exists today. The three categories of offence – treason, felony and misdemeanour – were subject to different procedures and rules of evidence. The distinction between treason and felony was abolished by the Treason Act 1945, with offences categorised as treason being treated in the same way as felonies. For the other distinction (between felony and misdemeanour), see Felony § England and Wales.) the act gave prisoners or third parties acting on their behalf the right to challenge their detention by demanding from the Lord Chancellor, Justices of the King's Bench, and the Barons of the Exchequer of the jurisdiction a judicial review of their imprisonment. The act laid out certain temporal and geographical conditions under which prisoners had to be brought before the courts. Jailors were forbidden to move prisoners from one prison to another or out of the country to evade the writ. In case of disobedience jailers would be punished with severe fines which had to be paid to the prisoner.

== Parliamentary history ==
The act came about because Anthony Ashley-Cooper, 1st Earl of Shaftesbury encouraged his friends in the Commons to introduce the bill where it passed and was then sent up to the House of Lords. Shaftesbury was the leading Exclusionist—those who wanted to exclude Charles II's brother James, Duke of York from the succession—and the bill was a part of that struggle as they believed James would rule arbitrarily. The Lords decided to add many amendments to the bill in an attempt to limit it, designed to protect the Lords from arrest by members of the Commons. However, the Commons had no choice but to pass the Bill with the Lords' amendments because they learned that the King would soon end the current parliamentary session and they desired to see the act enacted, even with limitations.

A popular but likely untrue anecdote holds claims that the act only passed because the votes in favour were miscounted as a joke. When a parliamentary house votes on legislation, each side—those voting for and against—appoints a teller who stands on each side of a door through which those Lords who vote "aye" re-enter the House (the "nays" remain seated). One teller counts aloud whilst the other teller listens and keeps watch to verify the count. Of the Habeas Corpus Act count, Gilbert Burnet wrote,

Lord Grey and Lord Norris were named to be the tellers: Lord Norris, being a man subject to vapours, was not at all times attentive to what he was doing: so, a very fat lord coming in, Lord Grey counted him as ten, as a jest at first: but seeing Lord Norris had not observed it, he went on with this misreckoning of ten: so it was reported that they that were for the Bill were in the majority, though indeed it went for the other side: and by this means the Bill passed.

In the words of historian Helen Nutting, this miscount story is "highly improbable". Proponents of the story cite as supporting evidence a discrepancy between the vote total and the attendance count in the parliamentary minutes: the clerk recorded in the minutes of the Lords that the "ayes" had fifty-seven and the "nays" had fifty-five, a total of 112, but the same minutes also state that only 107 Lords had attended that sitting. However, the attendance counts in the minute book were frequently inaccurate, and the attendance count is off by five rather than nine, undermining rather than supporting Burnet's reminiscence. According to Nutting, had the vote been miscounted, King James II would almost certainly have "taken advantage of a real miscount to overturn the act", since he opposed it.

King Charles II assented to the act in 1679 since, Nutting explains, "it was no longer controversial". The act is now stored in the Parliamentary Archives.

== Application in New Zealand ==
The Habeas Corpus Act 1679 and the later acts of 1803, 1804, 1816 and 1862 were reprinted in New Zealand as Imperial Acts in force in New Zealand in 1881.

The 1679 act, along with the Habeas Corpus Act 1640 (16 Cha. 1. c. 10) and the Habeas Corpus Act 1816 (56 Geo. 3. c. 100), was retained in New Zealand law by the Imperial Laws Application Act 1988. They were later repealed and replaced by the Habeas Corpus Act 2001.

== Subsequent developments ==
Section 14 of the act was repealed by section 1 of, and the schedule to, the Statute Law Revision Act 1863 (26 & 27 Vict. c. 125), which came into force on 28 July 1863.

Section 19 of the act was repealed by section 2 of, and the schedule to, the Public Authorities Protection Act 1893 (56 & 57 Vict. c. 61), which came into force on 1 January 1894.

The words " or felony " in section 1, and sections 2, 6 and 11, and 20, of the act, were repealed by section 10(2) of, and part III of schedule 3 to, the Criminal Law Act 1967, which came into force on 1 January 1968.

== See also ==
- Magna Carta
- Petition of Right
- Bill of Rights
