= Independence of New Zealand =

The independence of New Zealand from the United Kingdom came about progressively through a number of constitutional reforms. No single date is recognised as the point at which New Zealand became independent.

Beginning in the late 1700s New Zealand's Māori population was supplemented by sealers and whalers from Europe, followed by sporadic arrivals of adventurers from Europe and the Americas, Christian missionaries, and escaped convicts from Australia. British Resident James Busby arrived in New Zealand in May 1833. In 1835, a number of Māori chiefs asserted their sovereignty within their independent tribal nations by signing the Declaration of the Independence of New Zealand (He Whakaputanga o te Rangatiratanga o Nu Tireni). On 6 February 1840, William Hobson, as representative of the United Kingdom, and Māori chiefs signed the Treaty of Waitangi, which established the right of the British Crown to govern, and Hobson subsequently proclaimed British sovereignty over the islands in May of the same year.

On 16 November 1840, the British government issued the Charter for Erecting the Colony of New Zealand. The Charter stated that the Colony of New Zealand would be established as a Crown colony separate from New South Wales on 1 July 1841. In 1853, only 12 years after the founding of the colony, the British Parliament passed the New Zealand Constitution Act 1852, granting the colony's settlers the right to self-governance. New Zealand was, therefore, to all intents and purposes independent in domestic matters from its earliest days as a British colony.

A major step towards nationhood on the international stage came in 1919 when New Zealand was given a seat in the newly founded League of Nations. In 1926 the Balfour Declaration declared Britain's Dominions as "equal in status", followed by the creation of the legal basis of independence, established by the Statute of Westminster 1931, which came about mainly at the behest of nationalist elements in South Africa and the Irish Free State. Australia, New Zealand, and Newfoundland were hostile towards this development, and the statute was not adopted in New Zealand until 1947. Irrespective of any legal developments, some New Zealanders still perceived themselves as a distinctive outlying branch of the United Kingdom until at least the 1970s. This attitude began to change when the United Kingdom joined the European Community in 1973 and abrogated its preferential trade agreements with New Zealand, and gradual nationality and societal changes further eroded the relationship. The final legal constitutional links between the two countries were severed by the Constitution Act 1986.

== Declaration of Independence (1835) ==
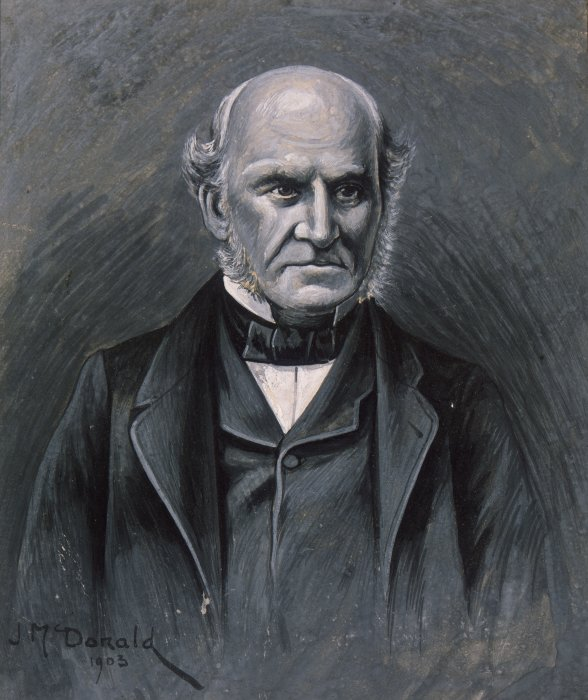
James Busby, the first British Resident in New Zealand

On 28 October 1835, the Declaration of the Independence of New Zealand was signed by the United Tribes of New Zealand, a loose confederation of Māori tribes from the far north of New Zealand organised by British resident James Busby. This document declared the independence of the Māori tribes (iwi) who signed the Declaration, which was acknowledged by Lord Glenelg, Secretary of State for War and the Colonies on behalf of the British Crown on 25 May 1836, following consideration of the Declaration by the House of Lords.

In 1839, in instructions given to Captain William Hobson, Lord Normanby said: "I have already stated that we acknowledge New Zealand as a sovereign and independent State, so far at least as it is possible to make that acknowledgment in favour of a people composed of numerous dispersed and petty tribes, who possess few political relations to each other, and are incompetent to act or even to deliberate in concert. But the admission of their rights, though inevitably qualified by this consideration, is binding on the faith of the British Crown." This was in the context of the urgent need to establish British authority in New Zealand, primarily to protect Maori from disaster. Normanby continued: "...extensive settlement of British subjects will be rapidly established in New Zealand, and that unless protected and restrained by necessary laws and institutions, they will repeat unchecked in that quarter of the globe the same process of war and spoliation under which uncivilised tribes have almost invariably disappeared, as often as they have been brought into the immediate vicinity of emigrants from the nations of Christendom. To mitigate, and, if possible, to avert these disasters, and to rescue the emigrants themselves from the evils of a lawless state of society, it has been resolved to adopt the most effective measures for establishing amongst them a settled form of civil government."

== Colonisation: Treaty of Waitangi ==
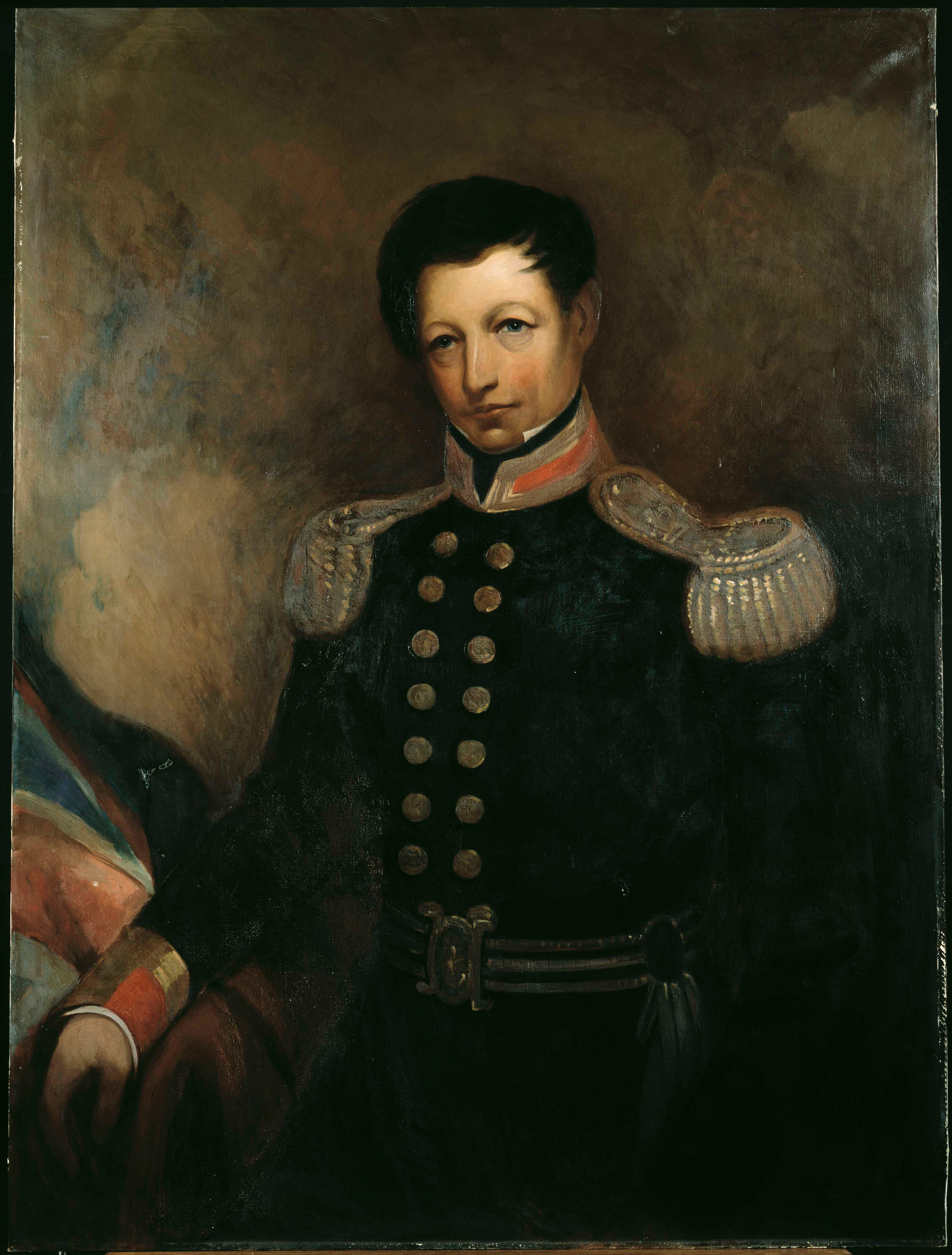
Captain William Hobson was New Zealand's first British-appointed Governor (originally Lieutenant-Governor) 1840–1842.

The signing of the Treaty of Waitangi on 6 February 1840 marked the beginning of the colonisation of New Zealand by Britain. At the same time, the New Zealand Company sought to acquire land from Māori in the lower North Island and upper South Island for its colonisation schemes. The company viewed itself as a prospective quasi-government of New Zealand and in 1845 and 1846 proposed splitting the colony in two along a line from Mokau in the west to Cape Kidnappers in the east—with the north reserved for Māori and missionaries, while the south would become a self-governing province, known as "New Victoria" and managed by the company for that purpose. Britain's Colonial Secretary rejected the proposal. On 21 May 1840, in response to the creation of a "republic" by the New Zealand Company settlers of Port Nicholson (Wellington), who were laying out a new town under the flag of the United Tribes of New Zealand, Hobson asserted British sovereignty over the whole of New Zealand, despite the incompleteness of the treaty signing. New Zealand was originally a sub-colony of the Colony of New South Wales, but in 1841 the Colony of New Zealand was created. Waitangi Day is thus celebrated as New Zealand's national day. Some constitutional lawyers, such as Moana Jackson, have argued that the Treaty did not cede total sovereignty of New Zealand to the British Crown, and argue that the Treaty intended to protect tino rangatiratanga or the absolute independence of Māori. Others dispute this, pointing to the use of the term kāwanatanga (governorship) in the Treaty deducts from rangatiratanga, equating the term to Māori control of Māori assets.

On 17 August 1840 the first French colonists (from the Nanto-Bordelaise Company) arrived in Akaroa, soon learning of the new British rule, and thus effectively ending any further colonisation attempts by France. The connection was severed formally when the last Commissaire du Roi (Representative of the king of France) departed New Zealand on 10 April 1846.

The principles behind the independence of New Zealand began before New Zealand even became a British colony. There had been minor rebellions in Canada, and in order to avoid making the mistakes which had led to the American Revolution, Lord Durham was commissioned to make a report on the government of colonies which contained a substantial British population. The principles of self-government within the Empire were laid down in the Durham Report of 1839 and first put into operation in Nova Scotia in 1848. Canada, New Zealand, and the Australian colonies very soon followed suit. The first New Zealand Constitution Act granting self-government was passed by Britain's parliament in 1846 but suspended following the arrival of Governor George Grey, who cited the outbreak of the Flagstaff War (the beginning of the New Zealand Wars) and the unwieldy nature of the 1846 Act as reasons for suspending the Act. In response, the Wellington Settlers' Constitutional Association was formed to campaign for self-government. Some members of this group, such as newspaper publisher Samuel Revans, recounting earlier New Zealand Company schemes for a separate colony, advocated for independence outside of the British Empire.

As a result of this pressure, Governor Grey wrote his own draft constitution bill, while camping on Mount Ruapehu in 1851. The draft was largely accepted by the British parliament, and New Zealand finally became a self-governing colony in 1853 following the passage of the New Zealand Constitution Act 1852, which established an elected legislature, the New Zealand Parliament, in the colony. The New Zealand Parliament was bound by a number of acts of the British Parliament, such as the Colonial Laws Validity Act 1865 and the Colonial Naval Defence Act 1865, which led to the creation of the flag of New Zealand in 1869.

New Zealand participated in the 1891 National Australian Convention in Sydney to consider the Federation of the Australian and New Zealand colonies. The convention agreed to four principles including the creation of a Federated army and navy. Interest in the proposed Australian Federation faded and New Zealand did not send a delegation to the 1897 National Australian Convention.

== Dominion status ==
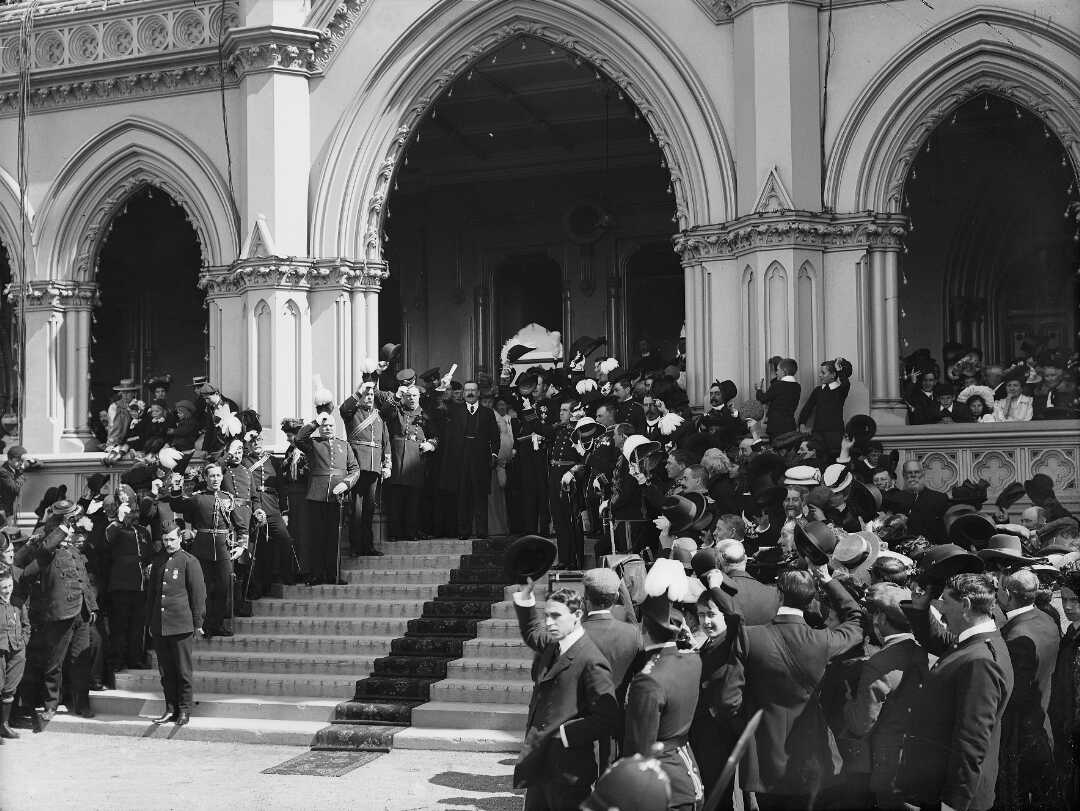
Lord Plunket declaring New Zealand a Dominion, 26 September 1907

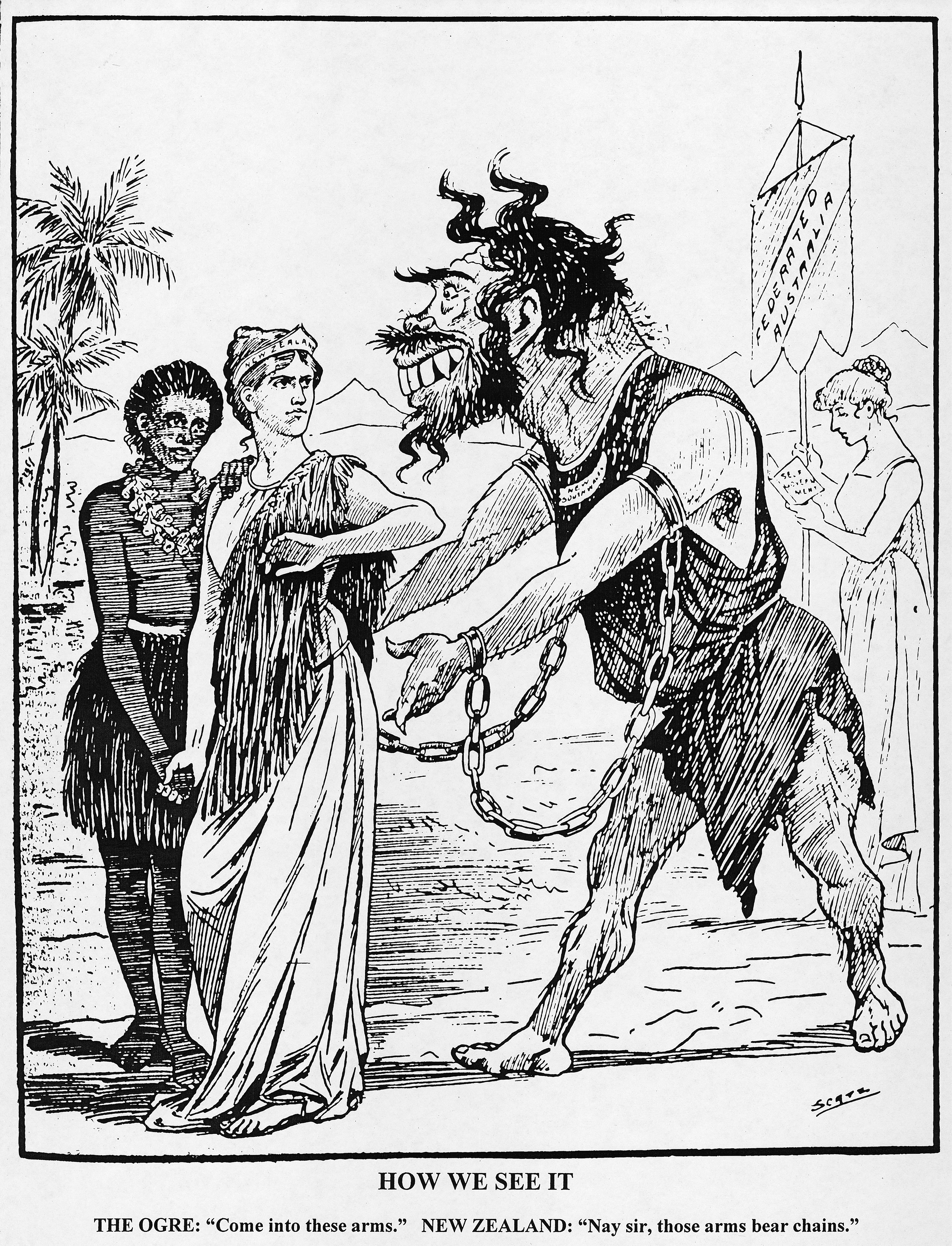
Zealandia rejecting Australian Constitution in 1900.

In 1901, New Zealand did not ratify the Australian Constitution, and did not partake in the Federation of Australia. Prime Minister Joseph Ward determined that New Zealand should become a dominion, and parliament passed a resolution to that effect. On 26 September 1907 the United Kingdom granted New Zealand (along with Newfoundland, which later became a part of Canada) "Dominion" status within the British Empire. New Zealand became known as the Dominion of New Zealand. The date was declared Dominion Day, but never reached any popularity as a day of independence.

Despite this new status, there was some apprehension in 1919 when Prime Minister Bill Massey signed the Treaty of Versailles, which indicated that New Zealand had a degree of control over its foreign affairs. Massey, himself a fervent imperialist, did not view it as a symbolic act.

The Balfour Declaration of 1926 declared that the British Dominions were equal, which had the effect of granting New Zealand control over its own foreign policy and military. The legislation required to effect this change, the Statute of Westminster 1931, was not adopted by New Zealand until 1947. By 1939, the governor-general ceased to be Britain's High Commissioner to New Zealand; instead, an independent officer was appointed.

== League of Nations ==
New Zealand joined the League of Nations on 10 January 1920. Under International Law only a sovereign state can sign an international treaty – although New Zealand and the other Dominions signed as part of a "British Empire Delegation", and their names were indented in a list following that of Britain. The significance of the indentation was perhaps deliberately left unclear. The Treaty of Versailles offered membership to any "fully self-governing State, Dominion, or Colony" (Art. 1).

At the 1921 Imperial Conference British Prime Minister Lloyd George said:

In recognition of their service and achievements during the war, the British Dominions have now been accepted fully into the comity of the nations of the whole world. They are signatories to the Treaty of Versailles and all other treaties of peace. They are members of the Assembly of the League of Nations, and their representatives have already attended meetings of the League. In other words, they have achieved full national status and they now stand beside the United Kingdom as equal partners in the dignities and responsibilities of the British Commonwealth. If there are any means by which that status can be rendered even more clear to their own communities and to the world at large, we shall be glad to have them put forward.

== 1926 Imperial Conference ==
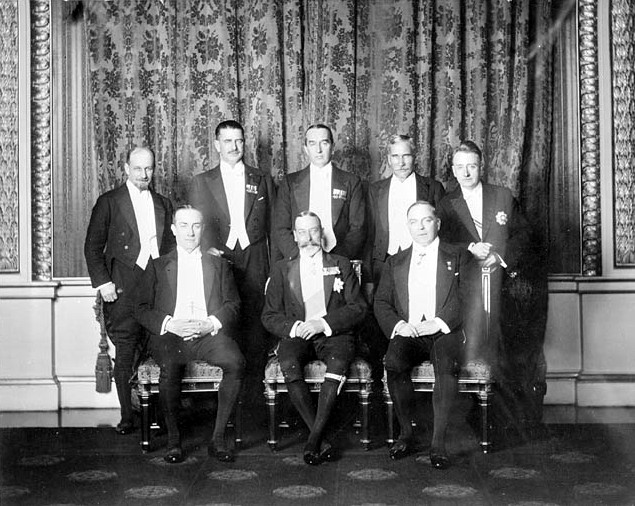
King George V with his prime ministers at the Imperial Conference of 1926 (Note: The figures in the photo are, back row, left to right: Walter Stanley Monroe, Prime Minister of Newfoundland; Gordon Coates, Prime Minister of New Zealand; Stanley Bruce, Prime Minister of Australia; James Hertzog, Prime Minister of South Africa, and W. T. Cosgrave, President of the Executive Council of the Irish Free State; front row, left to right: Stanley Baldwin, Prime Minister of the United Kingdom; the King; and William Lyon Mackenzie King, Prime Minister of Canada.)

The Balfour Declaration made at the time (not to be confused with the Balfour Declaration of 1917 on Palestine) stated that "They [the Dominions] are autonomous Communities within the British Empire, equal in status, in no way subordinate one to another in any aspect of their domestic or external affairs, though united by a common allegiance to the Crown, and freely associated as members of the British Commonwealth of Nations." This was given legal effect by the Statute of Westminster 1931, which took effect when a given Dominion adopted it. The New Zealand Government saw little urgency in the Act and delayed ratification, but for practical purposes 1926 had removed doubts about functional independence. At the opening of the 1930 Imperial Conference which drafted the Statute of Westminster, the Prime Minister of New Zealand, George Forbes stated:

New Zealand has not, in any great measure, been concerned with the recent development in the constitutional relations between the members of the British Commonwealth of Nations. We have felt that at all times within recent years we have had ample scope for our national aspirations and ample freedom to carry out in their entirety such measures as have seemed to us desirable.

In 1914 Britain declared war on the Central Powers for the whole British Empire but in 1939 the Dominions made their own decisions. On 3 September 1939 New Zealand declared war on Germany. A declaration of war is normally regarded as an indication of sovereignty.

== Statute of Westminster and Realm (1930s–1970s) ==
At the outset of the Second World War, the Prime Minister, Michael Joseph Savage, who had been critical of the British policy of appeasement, declared:

...for almost a century, behind the sure shield of Britain, we have enjoyed and cherished freedom and self-government. Both with gratitude for the past and with confidence in the future, we range ourselves without fear beside Britain. Where she goes, we go, where she stands, we stand. We are only a young nation, but we are one and all a band of brothers, and we march forward with a union of hearts and wills to a common destiny.

Savage's successor, Peter Fraser, did not withdraw New Zealand troops from the Middle East in 1942 (unlike Australia), based on an assessment of New Zealand's interests.

In the 1944 Speech from the Throne the Governor-General announced the Fraser government's intention to adopt the Statute of Westminster. However, there was a strong outcry by the opposition that this would weaken the British Empire in a time of need. In 1946, Fraser instructed Government departments not to use the term "Dominion" any longer. Ironically, the failure of a private members bill to abolish the upper house by future Prime Minister Sidney Holland led to the adoption of the Statute of Westminster on 25 November 1947 with the Statute of Westminster Adoption Act 1947. This Act allowed the passing of the New Zealand Constitution Amendment (Request and Consent) Act 1947, which granted the New Zealand Parliament full legislative powers, extra-territorial control of the New Zealand military forces and legally separated the New Zealand Crown from the British Crown. Thus, although the monarch of the United Kingdom remains also the monarch of New Zealand this person acts in a distinct capacity as sovereign of each.

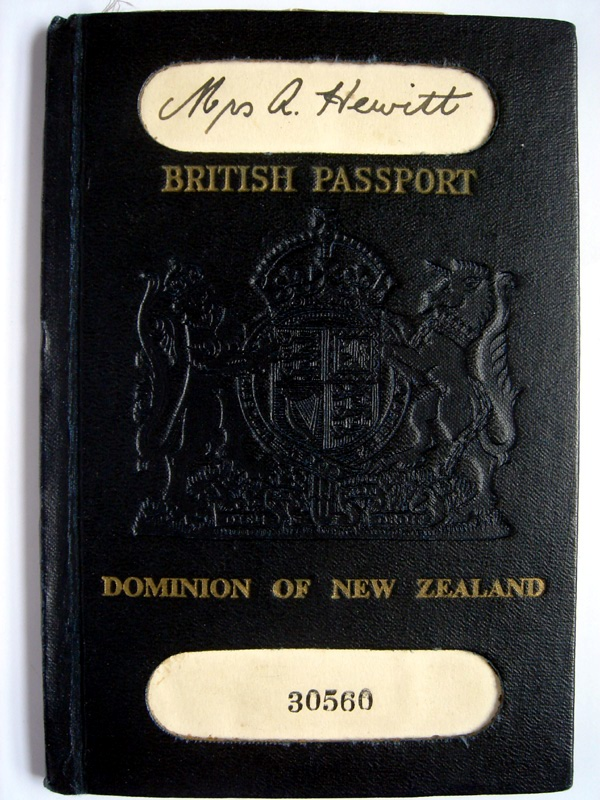
An old New Zealand passport, 1949, bearing the title "British Passport" with "Dominion of New Zealand" underneath.

In 1948, the New Zealand Parliament passed the British Nationality and New Zealand Citizenship Act 1948, altering the New Zealand nationality law. From 1 January 1949, all New Zealanders became New Zealand citizens. However, New Zealanders remained British subjects under New Zealand nationality law. Prior to this Act, migrants to New Zealand were classed as either "British" (mainly from the United Kingdom itself, but also other Commonwealth countries such as Australia, South Africa and India) or "Non-British".

At a meeting of Commonwealth prime ministers in 1952, following the death of King George VI, it was agreed that the new Queen Elizabeth could have a royal style and title that was different in each dominion, but with an element common to all the dominions. New Zealand was thus an independent Commonwealth realm. In 1953, the New Zealand Parliament passed the Royal Style and Titles Act 1953, which formally recognised Queen Elizabeth II as the Queen of the United Kingdom and New Zealand.

Until 1967, there was a requirement that nominations to the office of governor-general were approved by British ministers. The first New Zealand-born governor-general was appointed to the office, Lord Porritt (although Bernard Freyberg had previously been appointed in 1946; Freyberg had been born in the United Kingdom, but had lived in New Zealand from a young age). Porritt had also been resident in the United Kingdom for most of his life. Public opinion was divided on appointing a New Zealander to the role; a Gallup opinion poll for the Auckland Star newspaper found 43 per cent of respondents preferred Britons for the role, while 41 per cent favoured New Zealanders and 6 per cent candidates from other Commonwealth countries. Newspapers at the time welcomed the appointment, the Greymouth Star saying that it was "an acknowledgement of New Zealand's maturity." The result was a greater focus on new overseas markets for New Zealand goods, mainly in the Asia-Pacific regions.

== Loosened ties with the United Kingdom (1970s–present) ==
A major breakaway from British influence occurred in the mid-1960s as a result of the Vietnam War. Under the ANZUS Treaty and growing concerns about Communist influences in the Asia-Pacific region, the United States pressured the governments of Australia and New Zealand to contribute to the war in Vietnam, eventually resulting in both nations sending forces. New Zealand's involvement lasted from 1963 until 1975, consisting of both military and non-military aid. The Vietnam War was the first conflict that New Zealand entered that did not involve Britain or any other Commonwealth nations other than Australia.

A more significant move towards independence in a practical rather than legal sense came in 1973 when Britain joined the European Economic Community. The move, although anticipated, caused major economic structural adjustment issues, as the vast majority of New Zealand's exports went to Britain at that time.

The election of the nationalist Third Labour Government of Norman Kirk in 1972 brought further changes. Kirk's Government introduced the Constitution Amendment Act 1973, which altered the New Zealand Constitution Act 1852 so that the New Zealand Parliament could legislate extra-territorially. In Re Ashman the Supreme Court (since renamed the High Court, not to be confused with the contemporary Supreme Court) held that as a result of the 1973 Act, New Zealand had formally severed the New Zealand Crown from the British Crown. The Third Labour Government also passed the Royal Titles Act 1974, changing the Queen's style and titles to be solely Queen of New Zealand. The nationality listed in New Zealand passports for the passport holder was changed in 1973 from "British Subject and New Zealand Citizen" to simply "New Zealand citizen".

In 1983 a new Letters Patent was issued, written by a New Zealander and signed by the then New Zealand Prime Minister. The new letters patent declared New Zealand as the "Realm of New Zealand", and repealed the previous Imperial Letters Patent of 1917. The final practical constitutional link to Britain of New Zealand's Parliament was removed in 1986 by the Constitution Act 1986 (effective 1 January 1987). This Act removed the residual power of the United Kingdom Parliament to legislate for New Zealand at its request and consent. The Imperial Laws Application Act 1988 clarified the application of British laws in New Zealand.

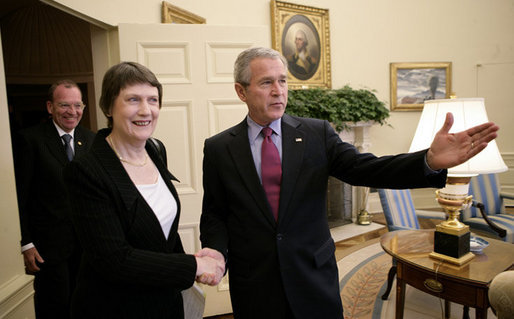
U.S President George W. Bush with Prime Minister Helen Clark during her visit to the White House in 2007

In 1996, New Zealand created its own royal honours system (including knighthoods and damehoods). The honours retained the Victoria Cross but ceased appointments to British imperial honours. With few exceptions, all honours and awards were conferred by the Queen of New Zealand on the advice of her New Zealand ministers. Certain awards remained in the exclusive gift of the Queen.

After long debate, the Fifth Labour Government, led by Helen Clark, discontinued appeals to the Judicial Committee of the Privy Council in 2003 and created the Supreme Court of New Zealand, a move further separating New Zealand from the United Kingdom.

== Flag debate ==
The flag of New Zealand features the British Union Jack in its left upper quadrant.

Although the current New Zealand flag remains a popular symbol of New Zealand, there have been proposals from time to time for the flag to be changed. Some proponents of a new flag have argued that the "current New Zealand Flag is too colonial and gives the impression that New Zealand is still a British colony and not an independent nation." Two referendums were held on the flag in 2015 and 2016, with a 56.6% majority voting to keep the current flag.

== See also ==
- Constitution of New Zealand
- Political history of New Zealand
