= Supreme Court Act 2003 =

Act of Parliament in New Zealand

New Zealand Parliament
- Royal assent: 17 October 2003
- Commenced: 1 January 2004 (last appeals to the Privy Council by 1 July 2004)
- Introduced by: Margaret Wilson (as Attorney-General)

Related legislation
- Judicature Act 1908; Senior Courts Act 2016
- Status: Repealed

The Supreme Court Act 2003 (Public Act No 53 2003) was an Act of the Parliament of New Zealand which created the Supreme Court of New Zealand as the country's court of final appeal, and which consequentially abolished appeals to the Judicial Committee of the Privy Council in the United Kingdom. The Act was repealed on 1 March 2017 and replaced by the Senior Courts Act 2016.

== Purpose ==
Section 3 of the Act states its purpose:

1) The purpose of this Act is—

(a) to establish within New Zealand a new court of final appeal comprising New Zealand judges—
(i) to recognise that New Zealand is an independent nation with its own history and traditions; and
(ii) to enable important legal matters, including legal matters relating to the Treaty of Waitangi, to be resolved with an understanding of New Zealand conditions, history, and traditions; and
(iii) to improve access to justice; and
(b) to provide for the court's jurisdiction and related matters; and
(c) to end appeals to the Judicial Committee of the Privy Council from decisions of New Zealand courts; and
(d) to make related amendments to certain enactments relating to courts or judicial proceedings.

(2) Nothing in this Act affects New Zealand's continuing commitment to the rule of law and the sovereignty of Parliament.

== See also ==
- Constitution of New Zealand
