= 1999 New Zealand MP reduction referendum =

- 27 November 1999
- Citizens Initiated Referendum On Reduction In Number Of MPs

Results
Choice	Votes	%
Yes	1,678,054	81.46%
No	381,894	18.54%
Valid votes	2,059,948	99.15%
Invalid or blank votes	17,699	0.85%
Total votes	2,077,647	100.00%

The 1999 New Zealand MP reduction referendum was held during the 1999 general election on 27 November 1999. The referendum considered two questions, in which one brought upon the question on whether New Zealand Parliament should be restructured - reducing the number of MPs from 120 to 99 members in the House of Representatives.

The 1999 referendum resulted in a favourable vote with 81% of voters in favour of the referendum, with a total voter turnout of 83%. However, since it was a citizen initiated referendum (CIR), its result was non-binding.

== Background ==
The 1999 Referendum was held on the 27 November 1999 in the 1999 general election of New Zealand, accompanied by another referendum question. The 1999 general election saw the governing National Party and Prime Minister Jenny Shipley defeated by the Labour Party and leader Helen Clark, making the fifth Labour Government in New Zealand.

In 1996, New Zealand officially implemented a mixed-member proportional (MMP) system in its government with the first MMP election held on 12 October 1996. The MMP system allows a citizen with two votes - one party vote and one electorate vote, in which 120 MP seats are awarded. Where the Referendum's question regarded whether the construction of the political landscape should reduce to 99 MPs, thereby affecting the MMP system of New Zealand.

The MMP system led to the development of a CIR system implemented in 1994, following the passing of the Citizens Initiated Referenda Bill in 1992. The CIR system requires a minimum of 10% of eligible voters to be in favour of implementing a CIR during a general election, in which the CIR system was accepted to be the form of referenda for the 1999 Referendum. The CIR allows electors to resolve political issues that cannot be resolved within parliament, allowing citizens to vote in a general election, argued to assist to increase voter turnout.

== 1999 New Zealand Parliament formation ==
The 1999 election that held the MP Reduction referendum included the election for New Zealand's 46th Parliament.

=== Coalition-government ===
The 1999 election led to a coalition government under the MMP system, in which the leading party-coalition was constructed of the Labour Party and the Alliance Party with the assistance of seats of the Greens Party. The coalition-government sat in parliament until the 2002 general election, as limited to the 3 year terms outlined in the New Zealand Constitution.

=== 1999 elected Prime Minister of New Zealand ===
Labour leader Helen Clark became the 37th prime minister of New Zealand. Helen Clark was the second female prime minister of New Zealand and the first elected, following Jenny Shipley as the first female prime minister from 1997 to 1999. The 1999 election saw two female party leaders, resulting in a guaranteed female prime minister of New Zealand, despite the political party associated with the individual.

The result of the 1999 general election led to three renewals of the Labour-Alliance Coalition, seeing Helen Clark to continue her leadership through a total of three terms. The 1999 general election enabled Prime Minister Clark to lead New Zealand from 1999 to 2008. Helen Clark stepped down in 2008 and retired completely from New Zealand Parliament in 2009.

=== Previous New Zealand prime minister ===
National Party leader Jenny Shipley was the 36th prime minister of New Zealand. Jenny Shipley was the first female New Zealand prime minister who sat in leadership from 1997 to 1999. Although, Jenny Shipley obtained her parliamentary seat and leadership through the loss of confidence vote and therefore resignation of Jim Bolger. Prime Minister Shipley was elected by the National Party and came to be the first female National Leader, although the challenge to leadership was unopposed.

Shipley's role as prime minister came to an end in the 1999 general election in which her opposition, Helen Clark commenced her 9-year-long party leadership. This election result saw Jenny Shipley remain as opposition leader until 2001, retiring from New Zealand Parliament in 2002.

=== Results of the 1999 general election ===
The 1999 election saw a majority to Labour Party winning 49 seats and the Alliance Party winning 10 seats and the Greens Party with 7 seats. Resulting in a coalition-parliament of an overall 66 seats, a majority in comparison to the opposition's total of 54 seats in a 120-seat parliament. The Labour-Alliance coalition retained all six mandatory Maori parliamentary seats.

== Citizens initiated referendum ==
The Citizens Initiated Referenda Bill came into effect in 1994, after its first introduction to Parliament in 1992. The Bill introduced the CIR system in New Zealand, one of many nations with a CIR, after the first introduction of an Initiative in Switzerland in 1848. Where the first CIR in New Zealand referred to a restructuring of Fire Emergency Services in New Zealand.

The Bill outlined various requirements for the utilisation of a CIR in New Zealand Parliamentary system. The requirements include:

- Minimum of 10% of all registered voters support of a CIR in a 12-month period prior to the indicative referendum
- Limit on monetary funds of both opposing and proposing sides of the CIR question
- Citizen's fee of NZD $500, to promote an initial petition for the indicative referendum

== Method ==
CIR was the category of referendum of the 1999 Referendum. This method was implemented in New Zealand due to the inability of the House of Representatives to decide on the issue of MP reduction in the parliament. New Zealand's CIR process provides eligible voters with voting powers on questions raised in referenda initiated by the public, although the results of CIRs in New Zealand are non-binding.

On the day of the 1999 general election, the MP Reduction Referendum was accompanied with the 1999 Referendum for the criminal justice system. The question of the second Referendum was to introduce reform of the prisons systems through the introduction of hard labour and imposing minimum sentences on violent offences - albeit despite an overwhelming majority in favour, it too was unsuccessful in its implementation in New Zealand.

== Stated benefits of a citizens initiated referendum in 1999 ==
The 1999 New Zealand MP reduction Referendum was held in the 1999 general election. CIRs in Zealand occur on election days for the convenience of eligible voters. Common reasons argued in favour of holding CIRs on election days include voter convenience, cost savings and voter turnout. The 1999 Referendum was deliberately scheduled on the day of the 1999 general election due to these reasons. Holding the CIR on the same day allowed for a cost savings of NZD $8 million in comparison to a separate CIR process.

== Question and results ==
The question of the 1999 Referendum was to reduce the size of the House of Representatives, asking voters whether it would be in favour of reducing parliament from 120 MPs to 99.

The CIR resulted in a total of 2,077,647 votes counted, with 17,699 claimed as blank and/or invalid votes. A total of 81.5% of voted in favour of the 1999 New Zealand MP Reduction Referendum, with 18.5% of voters against, favouring the reduction of MPs within New Zealand's House of Representatives.

Choice	Votes	%
For	1,678,054	81.46
Against	381,894	18.54
Total	2,059,948	100.00
Valid votes	2,059,948	99.15
Invalid/blank votes	17,699	0.85
Total votes	2,077,647	100.00
Registered voters/turnout	2,509,365	82.80
Source: Nohlen, D; et al.

== Public concerns ==
The 1999 MP Reduction Referendum obtained some critics in its capacity to affect the New Zealand Parliamentary landscape and led to discussions of the benefits of implementing such reduction, specifically on the then-new MMP system of New Zealand.

In the First Reading of the 1999 MP Reduction Referendum, discussions commenced on the potential effect of the MP Reduction Referendum on minority groups and individuals within New Zealand Parliament. Discussions regarding groups such as Female MPs, MPs with disabilities and Maori seats were brought upon within the discussions. The First Reading led to MPs addressing concerns on the implementation of the successful majority of the Referendum. Concerns regarded the reduction of MPs from 120 seats to 99, were said to potentially reduce the diversity within New Zealand Parliament, which has claimed to be a key reason for the implementation of a MMP system in 1996.

Concerns of the MP Reduction Referendum was not limited to a single Political Party in which MPs from multiple political backgrounds expressed the same concern, whether the referendum will undercut the importance and reasons for MMP system in New Zealand, specifically concerned regarding their constituents view on diversity in MP seats.

== Implementation ==
Within New Zealand, CIRs are non-binding. As CIRs allow citizens to initiate questions and referenda entirely, the New Zealand political system does not allow the results of the CIRs to be binding, in contrast to traditional legal binding referenda. The 1999 New Zealand MP Reduction Referendum was not legally required to be implemented within New Zealand politics.

The 1999 Referendum saw the MPs within New Zealand to remain at 120 members. However, the referenda question was seen to be raised again in the parliament in 2006, where Barbara Stewart MP introduced the Electoral (Reduction in Number of Members of Parliament) Amendment Bill on 23 February 2006. Although this was unsuccessful in passing the second reading. The failure of the Amendment Bill in the second reading led to the MPs in New Zealand Parliament to remain at 120 members.
