= Judicature Act 1908 =

Act of Parliament in New Zealand

Judicature Act

New Zealand Parliament
- Long title: An Act to consolidate certain Enactments of the General Assembly relating to the Supreme Court and the Court of Appeal, and to certain Rules and Provisions of Law in Judicial Matters generally (Note: The act’s title was updated over time to reflect the Supreme Court being renamed as the High Court in 1980, and for the change from General Assembly to Parliament of New Zealand in 1987.)
- Royal assent: 4 August 1908
- Repealed: 1 January 2018

Related legislation
- Supreme Court Act 2003; Senior Courts Act 2016
- Status: Repealed

The Judicature Act was an act of the New Zealand Parliament passed as part of the 1908 consolidation, to provide for a system of appellate courts. It received royal assent on 4 August 1908.

The act was largely repealed as of 1 March 2017 by the Senior Courts Act 2016 and other acts as part of a judicature modernisation package. It was repealed as a whole on 1 January 2018 when remaining provisions of the new acts came into force.
