= Habeas Corpus Act 1640 =

Act of the Parliament of England

Habeas Corpus Act 1640 (Note: The citation of this act by this short title was authorised by section 5 of, and the second schedule to, the Statute Law Revision Act 1948. Due to the repeal of those provisions, it is now authorised by section 19(2) of the Interpretation Act 1978.)
- Act of Parliament
- Parliament of England
- Long title: An Act for the Regulating the Privie Councell and for taking away the Court commonly called the Star Chamber. (Note: These words are printed against this act in the second column of the second schedule to the Statute Law Revision Act 1948, which is headed "Title".)
- Citation: 16 Cha. 1. c. 10
- Territorial extent: England and Wales

Dates
- Royal assent: 5 July 1641
- Commencement: 1 August 1641 (Note: Section 1.)
- Repealed: 25 October 1968
Other legislation
Amended by	Habeas Corpus Act 1679; Statute Law Revision Act 1863
Repealed by	Statute Law Revision Act 1888; Statute Law Revision Act 1948; Justices of the Peace Act 1968

Status: Repealed

Text of statute as originally enacted

The Habeas Corpus Act 1640 (16 Cha. 1. c. 10) was an act of the Parliament of England.

The act was passed by the Long Parliament shortly after the impeachment and execution of Thomas Wentworth, 1st Earl of Strafford in 1641 and before the English Civil War. It abolished the Star Chamber. It also declared that anyone imprisoned by order of the king, privy council, or any councillor could apply for a writ of habeas corpus, required that all returns to the writ "certify the true cause" of imprisonment, and clarified that the Court of Common Pleas also had jurisdiction to issue the writ in such cases (prior to which it was argued that only the King's Bench could issue the writ).

== Provisions ==
=== Section 6 ===
"Every Person committed contrary to this Act shall have an Habeas Corpus for the ordinary Fees.-And ... if any person shall hereafter be committed restrained of his Libertie or suffer imprisonment [by the Order or Decree of any such Court of Star Chamber or other Court aforesaid now or at any time hereafter having or p[re]tending to have the same or like Jurisdiction power or authoritie to commit or imprison as aforesaid Or by the command or Warrant of the Kings Majestie his Heires or Successors in theire owne Person or by the Command or Warrant of the Councell board or of any of the Lords or others of his Majesties Privy Councell] That in every such case every Person so committed restrained of his libertie or suffering imprisonment upon demand or motion made by his Councell or other imployed by him for that purpose unto the Judges of the Court of Kings Bench or Common Pleas in open Court shall without delay upon any pretence whatsoever for the ordinary Fees usually paid for the same have forthwith granted unto him a Writ of Habeas Corpus to be directed generally unto all and every Sheriffs Gaoler Minister Officer or other Person in whose custody the party committed or restrained shall be [and the Sheriffs Gaoler Minister Officer or other p[er]son in whose custody the p[er]ty so committed or restrained shall be] shall at the return of the said Writ & according to the command thereof upon due and convenient notice thereof given unto him [at the charge of the party who requireth or procureth such Writ and upon securitie by his owne bond given to pay the charge of carrying back the prisoner if he shall be remanded by the Court to which he shall be brought as in like cases hath beene used such charges of bringing up and carrying backe the prisoner to be alwaies ordered by the Court if any difference shall arise thereabout] bring or cause to be brought the body of the said party so committed or restrained unto and before the Judges or Justices of the said Court from whence the same Writ shall issue in open Court and shall then likewise certifie the true cause of such his deteinor or imprisonment and thereupon the Court within Three Court dayes after such return made and delivered in open Court shall proceed to examine and determine whether the cause of such commitment appearing upon the said return be just and legall or not and shall thereupon do what to justice shall appertaine either by delivering bailing or remanding the prisoner And if any thing shall be otherwise wilfully done or omitted to be done by any Judge Justice Officer or other person aforementioned contrary to the direction and true meaning hereof That then such person so offending shall forfeit to the party grieved his trebble damages to be recovered by such meanes and in such manner as is formerly in this Act limited and appointed for the like penaltie to be sued for and recovered."

Section 6 of the act remains good law in South Australia, Queensland, New South Wales and Victoria

== Subsequent developments ==
The writ was amended by the Habeas Corpus Act 1679 (31 Cha. 2. c. 2).

The words of enactment were repealed by section 1(1) of, and part I of the schedule to, the Statute Law Revision Act 1888 (51 & 52 Vict. c. 3), which came into force on 27 March 1888.

In the preamble, the words from "and by another Statute made in the six and thirtieth" to "inrolled in Latine", and the words of commencement were repealed by section 1 of, and the first schedule to, the Statute Law Revision Act 1948 (11 & 12 Geo. 6. c. 62), which came into force on 30 July 1948.

The whole act, so far as unrepealed, was repealed by section 8(2) of, and part I of schedule 5 to, the Justices of the Peace Act 1968, which came into force on 25 October 1968.

Section 6 of the act, so far as unrepealed, was repealed by section 8(2) of, and part II of schedule 5 to, the Justices of the Peace Act 1968, which came into force on 1 February 1969.
