= Letters Patent Constituting the Office of Governor-General of New Zealand =

Royal decree in New Zealand

The Letters Patent Constituting the Office of Governor-General of New Zealand is a royal decree and a part of the uncodified New Zealand constitution. Sometimes known as the Letters Patent 1983, the instrument has been amended twice (in 1987 and 2006) since its original issue in 1983. The letters patent—essentially an open letter from Queen Elizabeth II that is a legal instrument—constitutes the office of governor-general as the monarch's representative in the Realm of New Zealand, vests executive authority in the governor-general, establishes the Executive Council to advise the governor-general, and makes provision for the exercise of the governor-general's powers should the office be vacant.

== Background ==
The 1917 Letters Patent was issued by King George V and counter-signed by the British Secretary of State for the Colonies, Sir George Shuster, and sealed by the Great Seal of the United Kingdom. The 1917 Letters Patent were issued following the proclamation of the Dominion of New Zealand in 1907, renaming the office of "governor" to "governor-general". New Zealand adopted the Statute of Westminster in 1947 and letters patent then became the responsibility of the New Zealand Government, not the United Kingdom. It was not until the 1960s, with the appointment of the first New Zealand-born governor-general, Arthur Porritt, on the advice of Prime Minister Keith Holyoake, that the New Zealand Government decided that the 1917 Letters Patent needed updating. Following 1975 Australian constitutional crisis (where a governor-general dismissed a serving prime minister), greater urgency was given to reviewing the governor-general's powers.

In 1976, the Prime Minister's Department asked lawyer (now Dame) Alison Quentin-Baxter and her husband Professor Robert Quentin-Baxter to review the Letters Patent 1917. In anticipation of new letters patent being issued, Parliament passed the Seal of New Zealand Act 1977.

The review of the 1917 Letters Patent was completed in 1980. The Cabinet Office published the review, recommending new letters patent be issued. Following the report, draft Letters Patent were circulated with the governments of Niue and the Cook Islands, who gave their informal approval.

Prime Minister Robert Muldoon wanted the Queen to sign the Letters Patent during her 1981 Royal Tour of New Zealand. This did not eventuate as Labour Party backbenchers refused to support the idea, believing that the royal tour had been timed to be close to the 1981 general election (Labour's front bench, including party leader Bill Rowling, David Lange and Geoffrey Palmer, all supported the Queen signing during the Royal Tour). It was not until 26 September 1983 that an Order-in-Council was issued requesting the Queen's signature. The Queen signed the Letters Patent on 28 October 1983, and soon after they were counter-signed by Muldoon, and sealed by the Seal of New Zealand. This was the first time a New Zealand prime minister had signed the document, symbolising that it had been "patriated"—that is, made a New Zealand legal instrument.

The new Letters Patent came into force on 1 November 1983.

== Style ==
The Letters Patent are written as though they are an open letter from the Queen, although they are in fact a legal instrument (specifically, a royal decree) made under the Royal Prerogative, and are treated as statutory law. The 1980 review of the 1917 Letters Patent drew on the experience from the Canadian Letters Patent, 1947 created after Canada adopted the Statute of Westminster 1931. The style of the 1917 Letters Patent was criticised as "quaint, and certainly belonging to a century other than the 21st."

== Realm of New Zealand ==
Clause I of the Letters Patent defines the Realm of New Zealand as consisting of New Zealand, the Cook Islands, Niue, Tokelau and the Ross Dependency. The governor-general of New Zealand is also separately titled the governor of the Ross Dependency. This definition of the Realm of New Zealand recognised the new constitutions of the Cook Islands and Niue granted self-government.

== Governor-General and Commander-in-Chief of New Zealand ==
Clause I of the Letters Patent constitutes the office of "Governor-General and Commander-in-Chief of New Zealand". The full title is rarely used, and usually "Governor-General" is used because the commander-in-chief role is largely ceremonial also.

Clause II of the Letters Patent states that the governor-general is appointed by the sovereign, and serves "...during Our pleasure." Clause II does not spell out that the sovereign makes the appointment on the sole advice of the New Zealand prime minister, and that governors-general usually serve a term of five to six years in office. The commission appointing the governor-general, known as the Terms of Appointment, defines this term (which can be extended, as was the case in 2006 with Dame Silvia Cartwright) and is counter-signed by the New Zealand prime minister, signifying the reality that appointment is on the prime minister's advice.

The governor-general is commander-in-chief of the New Zealand Defence Force, but the Letters Patent does not further elaborate on this. The Defence Act 1990 further defines the role of commander-in-chief.

The Letters Patent delegates the sovereign's executive authority in the governor-general, and adds:

"Our Governor-General shall do and execute all the powers and authorities of the office according to ...such laws as are now or shall hereafter be in force in Our Realm of New Zealand or any part thereof."

This is a requirement that the governor-general act within statute law in force.

== Executive Council ==
Clauses VII-X of the Letters Patent establishes the Executive Council to advise the governor-general on the execution of his or her prerogative powers. Implicit in the Letters Patent is the requirement for the governor-general to act only on the advice of the Executive Council. The governor-general can act on the advice of a specific minister responsible, should this be specifically defined in statute.

Following a general election, the governor-general exercises his or her reserve powers to appoint a party leader as a member of the Executive Council and prime minister. Then, on the prime minister's advice, the governor-general appoints the remaining members of the Executive Council (whether inside or outside Cabinet).

== Royal prerogative of mercy ==
Clause XI of the Letters Patent defines the exercise of prerogative of mercy in New Zealand. The governor-general acts on the advice of the responsible minister—in the case of the prerogative of mercy that is the minister of justice. The governor-general has the power to grant a pardon, reduce a sentence, or refer a case back to the courts for reconsideration.

== Amendments ==
=== 1987 ===
Following the 1984 general election, a constitutional crisis arose where the outgoing Prime Minister, Robert Muldoon, apparently refused to implement the advice of the incoming Prime Minister, David Lange. One resolution to the crisis, canvassed by Deputy Prime Minister Jim McLay, was the replacement of Muldoon as party leader and therefore prime minister by the governor-general, following a vote of no-confidence by caucus. This would have left the governor-general with no advisers, as there were no sworn-in members of Parliament to be members of the Executive Council.

Following a review of constitutional law, a new Constitution Act, replacing the 1852 Imperial statute, was passed in 1986 and came into force from 1 January 1987. Section 6 of the new Constitution Act specified that members of the Executive Council had to be members of Parliament, but only after a period of 40 days. At the same time, an amendment to the Letters Patent 1983 was signed off. Clause VIII of the Letters Patent, on the composition of the Executive Council, amended the Letters Patent 1983 from 1 January 1987 to align with the provisions of the new Constitution Act. The 1987 amendment was recommended to the Queen by then Prime Minister David Lange.

=== 2006 ===
In 2006 a further set of amendments to the Letters Patent were made. The first amendment reflected the recent creation of the Supreme Court of New Zealand: Clause XII specifies that, in the absence of the governor-general, if a chief justice of New Zealand is not available to become the administrator of the Government then the position falls to the "next most senior Judge of the New Zealand judiciary" (before the clause referred to the president of the Court of Appeal of New Zealand). There was also a second amendment: Clause XV, requiring the governor-general to have the permission of the monarch to leave New Zealand, was revoked entirely. This recognised the increasing number of times the governor-general was travelling overseas to represent New Zealand. The 2006 amendments were recommended to the Queen by then Prime Minister Helen Clark.

== See also ==
- Constitution of New Zealand
- Letters Patent, 1947 – Canadian equivalent that was the basis for the New Zealand letters patent
