= Senior Courts Act 2016 =

Act of Parliament in New Zealand

New Zealand Parliament
- Passed by: New Zealand House of Representatives
- Passed: 11 October 2016
- Royal assent: 17 October 2016
- Commenced: 1 March 2017

Related legislation
- District Court Act 2016; Judicature Act 1908; Supreme Court Act 2003
- Status: Current legislation

The Senior Courts Act 2016 (Public Act 2016 No 48) is an Act of the Parliament of New Zealand which governs the High Court, the Court of Appeal and the Supreme Court of New Zealand. It was passed by the New Zealand House of Representatives on 11 October 2016 as part of a judiciary modernisation package and received royal assent on 17 October 2016. One of its purposes was to replace and consolidate in a single statute the Judicature Act 1908 and the Supreme Court Act 2003, which were repealed.
