= Habeas Corpus Act 1816 =

Act of the Parliament of the United Kingdom

Habeas Corpus Act 1816 (Note: The citation of this act by this short title was authorised by section 1 of, and the first schedule to, the Short Titles Act 1896, section 1 and the first schedule. Due to the repeal of those provisions it is now authorised by section 19(2) of the Interpretation Act 1978.)
- Act of Parliament
- Parliament of the United Kingdom
- Long title: An Act for more effectually securing the Liberty of the Subject.
- Citation: 56 Geo. 3. c. 100
- Territorial extent: United Kingdom

Dates
- Royal assent: 1 July 1816
- Commencement: 1 July 1816 (Note: The Acts of Parliament (Commencement) Act 1793.)
Other legislation
Amended by	Statute Law Revision Act 1888; Statute Law Revision (No. 2) Act 1890; Prison Act (Northern Ireland) 1953; Statute Law (Repeals) Act 1981

Status: Amended

Text of statute as originally enacted

Revised text of statute as amended

Text of the Habeas Corpus Act 1816 as in force today (including any amendments) within the United Kingdom, from legislation.gov.uk.

The Habeas Corpus Act 1816 (56 Geo. 3. c. 100) or Serjeant Onslow's Act is an act of the Parliament of the United Kingdom that modified the law on habeas corpus to remove the rule against controverting the return in non-criminal cases.

Historically, the rules around factual inquiries in decisions around petitions for habeas corpus had been based on the Opinion on the Writ of Habeas Corpus, a House of Lords disquisition by Wilmot CJ in 1758, which effectively nullified a bill for passage of An Act for giving a more speedy Remedy to the Subject upon the Writ of Habeas Corpus. It made the argument that the writ allowed the judge only to ask for an explanation of why the prisoner was jailed known as the 'return'), not to debate whether that explanation was justified or to examine the facts of it ('controvert' it), which was the role of the jury.

There were several ways around that. One was "confessing and avoiding", introducing and discussing contradicting the facts reported by the jailer, but simply invalidating them. A second method was "proceeding by rule and motion"; by making a ruling that was independent of the return, the judges did not technically argue with the return or contradict it, but the same outcome was reached as if they had done so. That caused some concern because of feelings that it restricted the ability of the courts to deal with arguments over facts from the applicant for the writ. A bill was introduced in 1758 to resolve that but was rejected; a second bill was introduced in 1816 and passed, coming into law as the Habeas Corpus Act 1816. It explicitly allows judges to question and debate the facts laid out in a return, but it deliberately does not extend to criminal cases for fear that it could lead to a full trial being conducted just on the petition and return. It, however, seemingly applies if the petitioner or subject has been arrested for a criminal matter but not charged.

Judith Farbey, a barrister and commentator on the law of habeas corpus, argues that the law is pointless; almost anything that could be justified under the 1816 Act could also be justified by classifying the fact that the judge wants to discuss as a "jurisdictional fact", another way of permitting debate. Paul D. Halliday, a professor of history at the University of Virginia agreed, arguing that "all these usages had been available at common law, and there is reason to question the status this act has traditionally received". The end result, though, was that "the rule against controverting the return may safely be regarded as a harmless relic of the past". Outside United Kingdom, legislation in various British territories and dominions ensured that it was enshrined in much Commonwealth law, including that of Singapore, Australia and New Zealand. Outside those jurisdictions in which it had a direct effect, it was still influential and was "soon duplicated in most American states".

== Bibliography ==
- Clark, David J. (2000). Habeas Corpus: Australia, New Zealand, the South Pacific. Federation Press. ISBN 186287302X.
- Farbey, Judith (2011). The Law of Habeas Corpus. Oxford University Press. ISBN 978-0199248247.
- Halliday, Paul D. (2010). Habeas Corpus: From England to Empire. Harvard University Press. ISBN 978-0674049017.
- Harding, Andrew (1993). Preventive Detention and Security Law: A Comparative Survey. Martinus Nijhoff Publishers. ISBN 0792324323.
- Oaks, Dallin H. (1966). "Legal History in the High Court: Habeas Corpus". Michigan Law Review. 64 (3). University of Michigan Law School: 451–472. doi:10.2307/1287225. ISSN 0026-2234. JSTOR 1287225.
- Eardley-Wilmot, John (1802). Notes of Opinions and Judgements Delivered in Different Courts [1757-1770]. Luke Hansard.
