= Major general (United Kingdom) =

2-star rank in the British Army and Royal Marines

- Army No. 2 and Royal Marines No. 1B service uniform insignia

- Motor car star plate
- Country: United Kingdom
- Service branch: British Army; Royal Marines
- Abbreviation: Maj Gen
- Rank group: General officers
- Rank: Two-star rank
- NATO rank code: OF-7
- Next higher rank: Lieutenant general
- Next lower rank: Brigadier
- Equivalent ranks: Rear admiral (RN); Air vice marshal (RAF)

Major general (Maj Gen) is a "two-star" rank in the British Army and Royal Marines. The rank was also briefly used by the Royal Air Force for a year and a half, from its creation in April 1918 until August 1919. In the British Army, a major general is the customary rank for the appointment of division commander. In the Royal Marines, the Commandant General holds at least the rank of major general.

A major general is senior to a brigadier but subordinate to a lieutenant general. The rank is OF-7 on the NATO rank scale, equivalent to a rear admiral in the Royal Navy or an air vice-marshal in the Royal Air Force and the air forces of many Commonwealth countries.

== Insignia and nomenclature ==
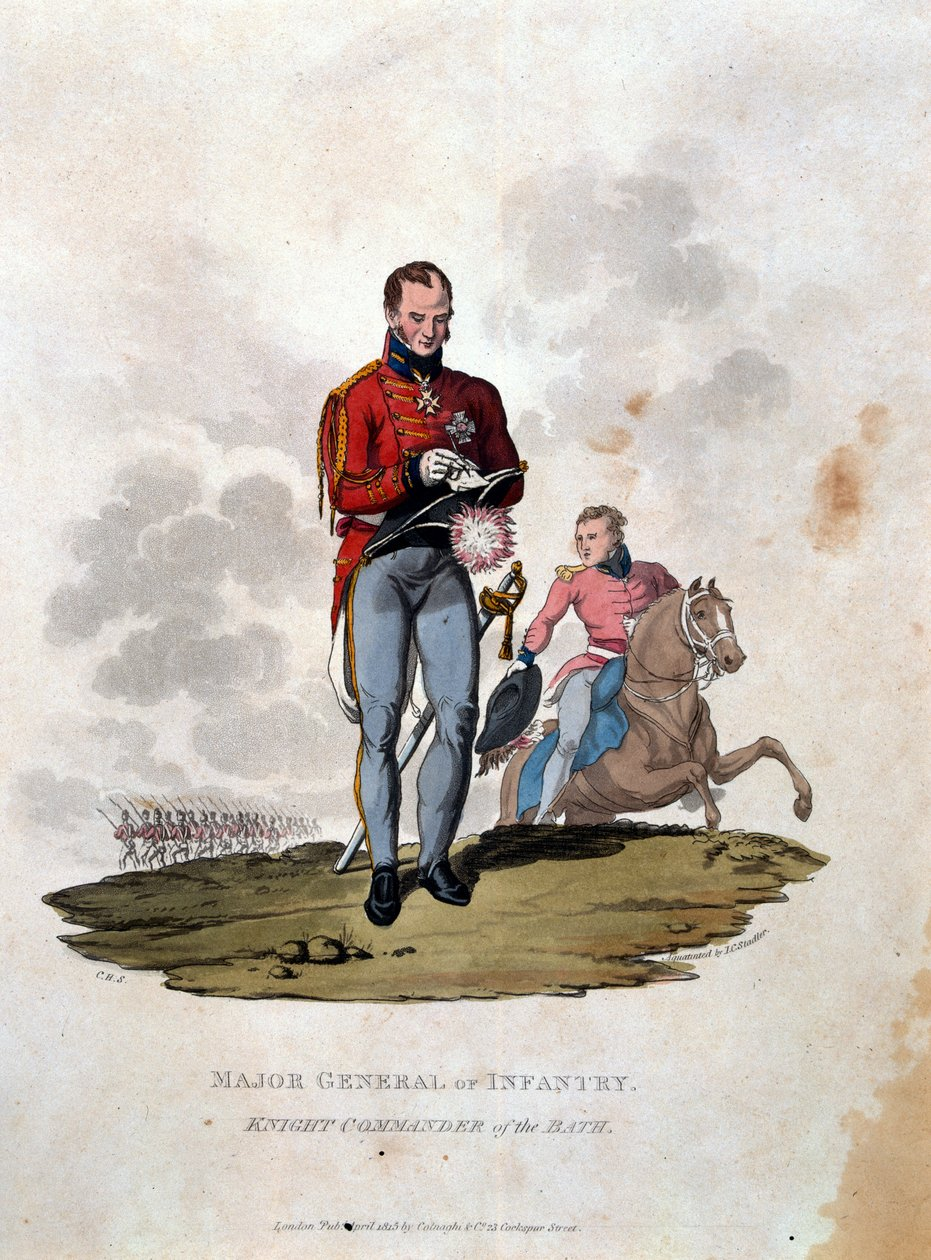
1815 engraving of a British major general

The rank insignia is the star (or 'pip') of the Order of the Bath, over a crossed sword and baton.

In terms of orthography, compound ranks were invariably hyphenated prior to about 1980. Nowadays the rank is almost equally invariably non-hyphenated. (Note: e.g. in The London Gazette, compare the entries in these two editions from 1979: firstly: "No. 47869". The London Gazette (Supplement). 16 June 1979. p. 2. and then:"No. 48015". The London Gazette (Supplement). 27 November 1979. p. 14929.) When written as a title, especially before a person's name, both words of the rank are always capitalised, whether using the "traditional" hyphenated style or the modern un-hyphenated style. When used as common nouns, they might be written in lower-case: "Major General Montgomery was one of several major generals to be promoted at this time."

== British Army usage ==
In the British Army, a division is commanded by a major general. However, other appointments may also be held by major generals. For example, the Commandant of the Royal Military Academy Sandhurst is a major general.

Until around the 1980s, the heads of each branch of service, such as the Royal Armoured Corps, the Royal Artillery and the Corps of Infantry, were major generals. Other, administrative, commands were also appointments for a major general. In addition, the senior officer of the Royal Army Chaplains' Department, the Chaplain-General, is accorded "the relative precedence" – the respect, courtesies and insignia, rather than the full powers and authority – of the rank of major general.

== Royal Marines usage ==
The office of Commandant General Royal Marines (CGRM), the professional head of the Royal Marines, was created at the rank of full general in 1943. In 1977, the rank was downgraded to lieutenant general, and it was further reduced to major general in 1996. On 30 April 2021, Lieutenant General Robert Magowan assumed the office of CGRM; he was succeeded on 25 November 2022 by Gwyn Jenkins, who already held the rank of full general from his appointment as Vice-Chief of the Defence Staff.

Royal Marines in tri-service roles may still hold the rank of major general: in April 2019, James Morris was appointed as commander of the Standing Joint Force, with the rank of major general.

As in the British Army, a Royal Marines major general ranks below a lieutenant general and above a brigadier.

== Royal Air Force usage ==
From its foundation on 1 April 1918 to 31 July 1919, the Royal Air Force (RAF) briefly used the rank of major-general. The service was a wartime amalgamation of the Army's Royal Flying Corps and the Navy's Royal Naval Air Service, so the ranks were a compromise between these two traditions. The insignia of the rank was derived from that of a Royal Navy rear-admiral and featured a broad gold stripe on the cuff below one narrow gold stripe. The two stripes were surmounted by an eagle (volant and affronty) under a King's crown. The RAF replaced the rank of major-general with the rank of air vice-marshal on 1 August 1919.

Despite the short duration, the significance of the RAF to modern warfare was indicated by the number of senior officers who did hold the rank of major-general in the RAF:

- Edward Ashmore
- Sefton Brancker
- George Cayley
- Edward Ellington
- Philip Game
- The Honorable Sir Frederick Gordon
- Frederick Heath-Caldwell
- John Higgins
- Mark Kerr
- Charles Lambe
- Charles Longcroft
- Godfrey Paine
- Geoffrey Salmond
- John Salmond
- Ernest Swinton
- Frederick Sykes
- Hugh Trenchard

== See also ==
- British and U.S. military ranks compared
- British Army Other Ranks rank insignia
- British Army officer rank insignia
