= List of Royal Flying Corps brigades =

The Royal Flying Corps brigades were organizational formations of British military aircraft and personnel during World War I that typically controlled several wings. The air brigade system was introduced into the Royal Flying Corps in late 1915 and initially retained by the Royal Air Force on its establishment on 1 April 1918. Following the Allies' victory later that year the air brigades were disbanded in 1919. Subsequently, the RAF was restructured with commands comprising groups and groups comprising wings without the need for brigades.

== Origins ==
Following Sir David Henderson's return from France to the War Office in August 1915, he submitted a scheme to the Army Council which was intended to expand the command structure of the Flying Corps. The Corps' wings would be grouped in pairs to form brigades and the commander of each brigade would hold the temporary rank of brigadier-general. The scheme met with Lord Kitchener's approval and although some staff officers opposed it, the scheme was adopted.

In the field, most brigades were assigned to the army. Initially a brigade consisted of an army wing and corps wing; beginning in November 1916 a balloon wing was added to control the observation balloon companies. Logistics support was provided by an army aircraft park, aircraft ammunition column and reserve lorry park.

== List of Brigades ==
The following brigades were established (the date of establishment is shown in parentheses):

=== I Brigade ===
Established 16 January 1916 at Aire. Disbanded on 5 March 1919. The brigadier-generals commanding were:

- E B Ashmore (1916)
- D le G Pitcher (1916–17)
- G S Shephard (1917–18)
- C T MacLean (1918) – Temporary appointment, not a general officer
- D le G Pitcher (1918)

=== II Brigade ===
Established 23 October 1915 in Great Britain. Disbanded on 14 September 1919. The brigadier-generals commanding were:

- J F A Higgins (1915–1916)
- In abeyance from 15 January to 10 February 1916. The original II Brigade was re-designated as the VI Brigade on 15 January 1916. Re-established at Oxelaere on 10 February 1916.
- J M Salmond (1916)
- T I Webb-Bowen (1916–1917)
- J H W Becke (1917–1918)
- T I Webb-Bowen (1918)

=== III Brigade ===
Established 16 January 1916 at Beauval. Disbanded on 10 March 1919. The brigadier-generals commanding were:

- J F A Higgins (1916–1918)
- Charles Longcroft (1918)

=== IV Brigade ===
Established 1 April 1916 at Les Alençons. Disbanded in October 1918. The brigadier-generals commanding were:

- E B Ashmore (1916)
- J H W Becke (1916–1917)

=== V Brigade ===
Established 15 December 1915 at No.5 Lower Temple Street, Birmingham, Great Britain. Disbanded on 1 April.1919. The brigadier-generals commanding were:

- William Sefton Brancker (December 1915 - January 1916)
- J M Salmond (January - March 1916)
- Disbanded - 9 March to 27 August 1916
- C A H Longcroft (1916–1917)
- L E O Charlton (1917–1918)

=== VI Brigade ===
Established 15 January 1916 with its headquarters at 13 Albemarle Street, Piccadilly, London. On establishment, it comprised the assets of the II Brigade. It ceased to exist on 20 July 1916 when its assets were re-designated as the Training Brigade. The Brigade was re-established on 12 October 1917 when the Home Defence Brigade was retitled as the VI (Home Defence) Brigade. It finally ceased to exist on 9 July 1919 when it was reduced to wing strength and re-designated as the Home Defence Wing. The brigadier-generals commanding were:

- J F A Higgins (1916)
- J M Salmond (1916)
- In abeyance from 20 July 1916 to 12 October 1917
- T C R Higgins (1917)

=== Middle East Brigade ===
The Middle East Brigade was established on 1 July 1916 with its headquarters at Cairo. It ceased to exist on 5 October 1917 when it was upgraded to divisional status and retitled HQ RFC Middle East. The brigadier-general commanding was:

- W G H Salmond (1916–1917)

=== RFC Cadet Brigade ===
Formed on 3 September 1917 at Hastings, it was re-designated the RAF Cadet Brigade on 1 April 1918. Succeeded by the RAF (Cadet) College at Cranwell on 1 November 1919. The RFC/RAF Cadet Brigade's commander was:

- A C Critchley (1917-18)

=== Palestine Brigade ===
Palestine Brigade (5 October 1917). The brigadier-general commanding was:

- Direct command of GOC, RFC Middle East
- A E Borton (1917–1918)

=== VII Brigade ===
The VII Brigade was established in October 1917. It was disbanded on 26 March 1918. The brigadier-generals commanding were:

- T I Webb-Bowen (1917–1918)
- C L Lambe (1918)

=== Training Brigade (Middle East) ===
Established at Heliopolis on 14 December 1917. On 18 March 1920, the brigade was redesignated the Egyptian Group. The brigadier-general commanding was:

- P L W Herbert (1917–1918)

=== VIII Brigade ===
The VIII Brigade was established on 28 December 1917. It was disbanded on 5 March 1919. The brigadier-general commanding was:

- C L N Newall (1917–1918)

=== IX Brigade ===
The IX Brigade was established on 6 March 1918 and disbanded on 8 August 1919. The brigadier-general commanding was:

- R E T Hogg (1918)

=== Training Brigade ===
The brigadier-general commanding was:

- J M Salmond (1916–1917)

=== Home Defence Brigade ===
The Home Defence Brigade was formed at Adastral House, London on 15 August 1917 by re-designating the Home Defence Group as a brigade. Less than two months later, the brigade received a "boilerplate" number and became the 6th (Home Defence) Brigade on 12 October 1917. The brigadier-general commanding was:

- J F A Higgins (1917)

=== Eastern Training Brigade ===
The brigadier-generals commanding were:

- R E T Hogg (1917–1918)
- C F De S Murphy (1918)

=== Northern Training Brigade ===
The brigadier-generals commanding were:

- P L W Herbert (1917)
- R R Smith-Barry (1918)

=== Southern Training Brigade ===
Formed at Salisbury on 5 August 1917 within the Royal Flying Corps's Training Division, it ceased to exist as a brigade on 1 April 1918 when it was re-designated as No. 7 Group. The Southern Training Brigade's only brigadier-general commanding was:

- H C T Dowding (1917–1918)

=== X Brigade ===
Established as part of the Royal Air Force on 18 June 1918 at Basse Boulogne. It was disbanded on 1 March 1919. The brigadier-general commanding was:

- E R Ludlow-Hewitt (1918)

=== XI Brigade ===
Established as part of the Royal Air Force on 29 September 1918 at Hurst Park. Although intended for service as part of the Independent Force in France, the armistice came before it was deployed and the XI Brigade was disbanded on or about 15 November 1918. Its commander was:

- Brigadier-General C L Courtney
