= Paul Maltby =

Royal Air Force Air Vice-Marshal (1892-1971)

Sir Paul Maltby
- Born: 5 August 1892; Alappuzha, India
- Died: 2 July 1971 (aged 78); Aldershot, Hampshire, England
- Relatives: Major General Christopher Maltby (brother)
- Military career
- Allegiance: United Kingdom
- Branch: British Army (1911–18); Royal Air Force (1918–46)
- Service years: 1911–1946
- Rank: Air Vice Marshal
- Commands: Westgroup, Java (1942); RAF Northern Ireland (1941); No. 71 Group (1940–41); No. 24 Group (1938–40); RAF Mediterranean (1935–38); Central Flying School (1932–35); No. 1 Wing (1925–26); No. 5 Squadron (1919–24)
- Conflicts: First World War; Second World War
- Awards: Knight Commander of the Royal Victorian Order; Knight Commander of the Order of the British Empire; Companion of the Order of the Bath; Distinguished Service Order; Air Force Cross; Grand Officer of the Order of Orange-Nassau (Netherlands)
- Other work: Serjeant-at-Arms, House of Lords; Deputy Lieutenant of Southampton

Air Vice Marshal Sir Paul Copeland Maltby, KCVO, KBE, CB, DSO, AFC, DL (5 August 1892 – 2 July 1971) was a senior Royal Air Force officer who later served as the Serjeant at Arms in the House of Lords.

== Military career ==
In 1942 Maltby was assistant Air Officer Commanding Far East Command and Air Officer Commanding RAF in Java. He ordered the formation of 225th RAF (Bomber) Group on 1 January 1942. Maltby arrived in West Java on 14 February 1942 and set up his headquarters at Soekaboemi. The allies suffered heavy losses of planes to the Japanese.

On 22 February 1942 the ABDA Command was dissolved. Churchill generally agreed with Wavell that Java should be fought for, but insisted that the main reinforcements should be sent to Burma and India and not to Java. The overall command was handed over to the Royal Netherlands East Indies Army. Churchill signaled Maltby the very next day:

I send you and all ranks of the British forces who have stayed behind in Java my best wishes for success and honour in the great fight that confronts you. Every day gained is precious, and I know that you will do everything humanly possible to prolong the battle.

Maltby's main tasks were to continue the fight to defend Java as long as equipment could be maintained and do everything possible to evacuate surplus units and personnel to Ceylon or Australia.

The Japanese invasion force landed on Java at the end of February and the start of March. The allied forces were quickly beaten. On 12 March 1942 the senior British, Australian and American commanders were summoned to Bandoeng where the formal instrument of surrender was signed in the presence of the Japanese commander in the Bandoeng area, Lieutenant General Masao Maruyama, who promised them the rights of the Geneva Convention for the protection of prisoners of war.

From 1942 to 1945 Maltby was a prisoner of war.

Maltby's son John Newcombe Maltby married Lady Sylvia Harris, daughter of William Harris, 6th Earl of Malmesbury.
