= RAF Rhine =

RAF Rhine was the name of the Royal Air Force command that comprised units posted to Germany in 1919 as part of the occupying forces following the First World War. It was previously the HQ RAF Army of the Rhine, which was formed during June 1919 at Marienburg, Cologne. It was renamed to RAF Rhine during October 1919 while at still Marienburg. The Royal Air Force presence in Germany was wound down to No. 12 Squadron RAF and 'Q' Unit RAF.

'Q' Unit was formed during October 1919 at Eil, it was disbanded during May 1920.

RAF Rhine existed until at least June 1920, with the disbandedment the remaining units were directly under command of the Army of Occupation. RAF Rhine continued to be listed in AFL until at least July 1922.

Its headquarters were at Bickendorf, Germany.

Commanders:

- 4 Jan 1919 Maj-Gen Sir John Higgins known as John Higgins
- 7 May 1919 Maj-Gen Sir John Salmond

== See also ==
- List of Royal Air Force commands
