= Hazelton Nicholl =

Royal Air Force Air Vice-Marshal (1882-1956)

Air Vice Marshal Sir Hazelton Nicholl KBE, CB
- Born: 14 January 1882
- Died: 14 August 1956 (aged 74)
- Military career
- Allegiance: United Kingdom
- Branch: British Army; Royal Air Force
- Service years: 1899–c.1904 1915–1942
- Rank: Air Vice Marshal
- Commands: RAF Middle East (1938–39); Central Area (1934–35); No. 23 Group (1933–34); RAF Calshot (1932–33); No. 70 Squadron (1926–29); 41st Wing (1918–19); No. 110 Squadron (1917–18); No. 84 Squadron (1917)
- Conflicts: Second Boer War; First World War; Second World War
- Awards: Knight Commander of the Order of the British Empire; Companion of the Order of the Bath; Mentioned in Despatches; Knight of the Legion of Honour (France)

Air Vice Marshal Sir Hazelton Robson Nicholl, KBE, CB (14 January 1882 – 14 August 1956) was a Royal Air Force officer who served as Air Officer Commanding-in-Chief RAF Middle East from 1938 to 1939.

== Military career ==
Nicholl served as a private soldier in the London Scottish Volunteers in the Second Boer War and then transferred to the South Rhodesia Volunteers in 1903. He was commissioned into the Royal Flying Corps Special Reserve in 1915 during the First World War and served as a pilot with No. 8 Squadron before instructing at the Central Flying School and then becoming Officer Commanding No. 84 Squadron and subsequently Officer Commanding No. 110 Squadron on the Western Front.

After the war, Nicholl became a Staff Officer at the Air Ministry before being appointed Officer Commanding No. 70 Squadron in 1926. He was made Deputy Director of Training and then Deputy Director of Personal Services before becoming Deputy Director of Manning at the Air Ministry in 1931. He went on to be Station Commander at RAF Calshot in 1932, Air Officer Commanding No. 23 Group in 1933 and Air Officer Commanding Central Area in 1934. After that he was made a Member of the Air Board of the Royal Australian Air Force in 1935, Air Officer Commanding-in-Chief RAF Middle East in 1938 and Air Officer for Administration at Headquarters Fighter Command in 1939, the post he held in the early years of the Second World War. He retired in 1942.

== Later life ==
Nicholl retired to Scotland and became Controller of the RAF Benevolent Fund.

Military offices
Preceded by Stanley Goble	Air Member for Personnel (RAAF); 1935–1937	Succeeded by Stanley Goble
Preceded by Cuthbert MacLean	Air Officer Commanding RAF Middle East; 1938–1939	Succeeded by Sir William Mitchell
