= Charles Laverock Lambe =

British Royal Navy officer (1875–1953)

Sir Charles Laverock Lambe
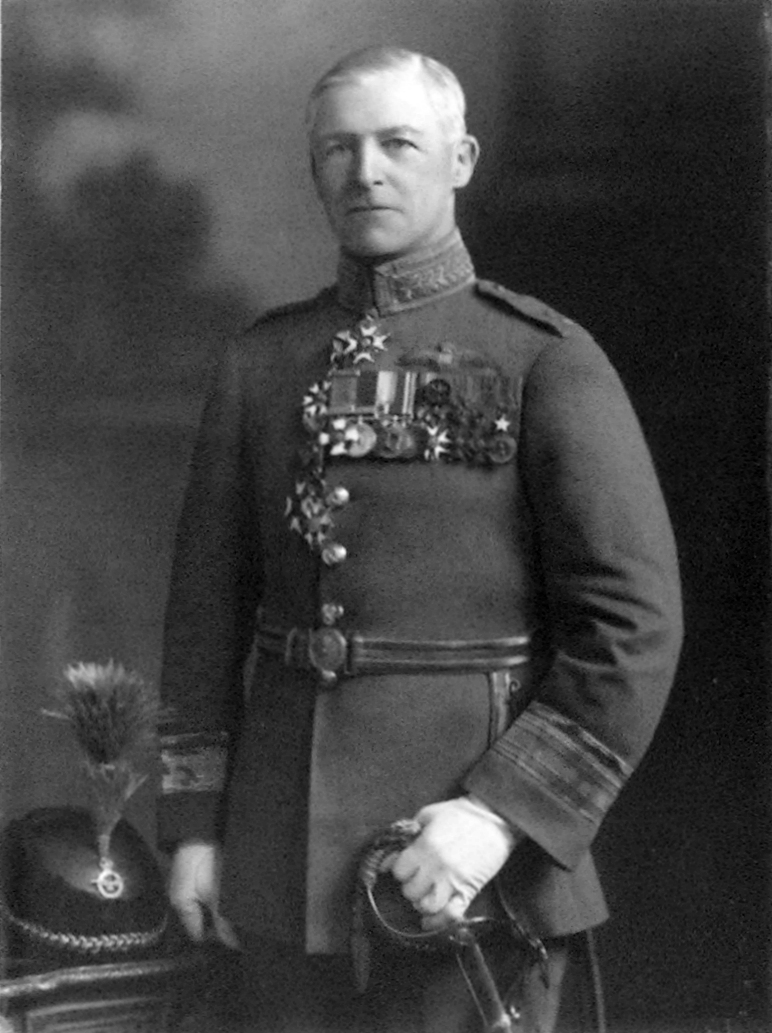
- Air Vice Marshal Lambe
- Born: 10 May 1875
- Died: 25 April 1953 (aged 77)
- Military career
- Allegiance: United Kingdom
- Branch: Royal Navy (1889–1918); Royal Air Force (1918–31)
- Service years: 1891–1931
- Rank: Air Vice Marshal
- Commands: Coastal Area (1928–31); RAF Halton (1924–28); No. 1 School of Technical Training (1924–28); Midland Area (1919); No. 5 Group (1918–19); VII Brigade RAF (1918); RNAS Dover Command (1916–18); No. 5 Squadron RNAS (1915); HMS Hermes (1914–15)
- Conflicts: Benin Expedition of 1897; First World War
- Awards: Knight Commander of the Order of the Bath; Companion of the Order of St Michael and St George; Distinguished Service Order; Mentioned in Despatches; Officer of the Legion of Honour (France); Croix de guerre (France); Commander of the Order of Leopold (Belgium); Knight of the Order of the Crown (Belgium); Croix de guerre (Belgium); Navy Distinguished Service Medal (United States)

Air Vice Marshal Sir Charles Laverock Lambe, KCB, CMG, DSO (10 May 1875 – 25 April 1953) was a distinguished officer in the Royal Navy and a foundational commander in the Royal Air Force (RAF) on its creation in 1918. Lambe was one of the most senior officers with naval experience to serve in the 1920s RAF.

== Biography ==
Joining the Royal Navy in 1889, Lambe attended the training ship Britannia. In 1897 he was promoted to lieutenant and served aboard HMS Magpie, taking part in Rear Admiral Rawson's punitive expedition to Benin. Lambe later served at the Naval Ordnance Department as an assistant to the Director of Naval Ordnance and Torpedoes. Promoted to Commander in 1908 he was again appointed an assistant to the Director of Naval Ordnance in 1913.

In August 1914, Lambe was appointed as captain of the seaplane carrier HMS Hermes, which sank after being torpedoed in October of the same year. At the start of August 1916, having just been promoted to wing captain, Lambe took up appointment as the officer commanding the Royal Naval Air Service's Dover Command which included RNAS units at Dunkirk. During his time at the Dover Command, Lambe's aircraft carried out bombing raids on the German submarine harbours at Bruges. On 1 April 1918, Lambe was appointed General Officer Commanding the VII Brigade of the RAF. On 23 April, Lambe's VII Brigade carried out air attacks as part of the blocking of Zeebrugge and Ostend. On 9 May, Lambe was once again the air commander in a naval action, this time for the Second Ostend Raid.

In 1919 Lambe was selected by Sir Hugh Trenchard to sit on the Air Council and in 1924 he was appointed commandant of the RAF's No. 1 School of Technical Training. In 1928 Lambe was appointed Air Officer Commanding Coastal Area (the forerunner of Coastal Command) from where he retired in the rank of air vice marshal in 1931. Lambe died on 25 April 1953.

Military offices
Unknown	Officer Commanding RNAS Dover Command; 1916–1918	Command disbanded Responsibilities transferred to VII Brigade
Vacant Title last held by Tom Webb-Bowen; On 26 March 1918 (Italian operations)	General Officer Commanding VII Brigade (Dover and Dunkirk operations); April – May 1918	Brigade disbanded Responsibilities transferred to No. 5 (Operations) Group
Preceded by Frederick Halahan; As Officer Commanding	General Officer Commanding No. 5 (Operations) Group; 1918–1919	Vacant Title next held by William Callaway; In 1937; As Air Officer Commanding
Preceded by John Higgins	General Officer Commanding Midland Area; January – February 1919	Succeeded by Bertram Cooke
Preceded by Unknown or none	Director of Equipment; 1919–1922	Succeeded by Duncan Pitcher
Preceded by Francis Scarlett	Commandant, No. 1 School of Technical Training; 1924–1928	Succeeded by Ian Bonham-Carter
Preceded by Francis Scarlett	Air Officer Commanding Coastal Area; 1928–1931	Succeeded by Robert Clark-Hall
