= General Cook =

General Cook may refer to:

- Donald G. Cook (born 1946), U.S. Air Force four-star general
- Gilbert R. Cook (1889–1963), U.S. Army major general
- Henry Cook (aviator) (fl. 1890s–1910s), Royal Artillery brigadier general
- John Pope Cook (1825–1910), Union Army brigadier general and brevet major general
- Orval R. Cook (1898–1980), U.S. Air Force four-star general
- Philip Cook (general) (1817–1894), Confederate States Army brigadier general

== See also ==
- General Cooke (disambiguation)
- Attorney General Cook (disambiguation)
