= Attorney General Cook =

Attorney General Cook may refer to:

- Daniel Pope Cook (1794–1827), Attorney General of Illinois
- Eugene Cook (Georgia judge) (1904–1967), Attorney General of Georgia

== See also ==
- General Cook (disambiguation)
