= Tom Webb-Bowen =

Royal Air Force Air Vice-Marshal (1879-1956)

Sir Tom Webb-Bowen
- Born: Tom Ince Webb-Bowen; 17 January 1879
- Died: 29 October 1956 (aged 77)
- Military career
- Allegiance: United Kingdom
- Branch: British Army (1899–1918); Royal Air Force (1918–1941)
- Service years: 1899–1933; 1939–1941
- Rank: Air Vice-Marshal
- Commands: Wessex Bombing Area (1931–1933); Air Member for Personnel (1930–1931); RAF Middle East (1926–1929); Inland Area (1924–1926); No. 3 Group (1923–1924); RAF India (1920–22); South Eastern Area (1919); II Brigade RFC (1916–1917, 1918–1919); VII Brigade RFC (1917–1918); No. 3 Wing RFC (1915–1916); No. 2 Squadron (1915)
- Conflicts: First World War; Second World War
- Awards: Knight Commander of the Order of the Bath; Companion of the Order of St Michael and St George; Mentioned in Despatches (3); Order of Saint Anna, 3rd Class with Swords (Russia); Officer of the Order of Leopold (Belgium); Officer of the Legion of Honour (France); Croix de guerre (France); Officer of the Military Order of Savoy (Italy)

Air Vice-Marshal Sir Tom Ince Webb-Bowen, KCB, CMG, DL (17 January 1879 – 29 October 1956) was a senior commander in the Royal Air Force during the first half of the 20th century.

== Early life ==
Tom Ince Webb-Bowen was born on 17 January 1879, the son of Thomas Ince Webb-Bowen (senior) who served as the Chief Constable of Pembrokeshire Police from 1 January 1879 to 1 December 1906.

The younger Webb-Bowen was initially commissioned into a militia battalion of the Middlesex Regiment, then transferred to the regular army with a commission into the Bedfordshire Regiment as a second lieutenant on 20 May 1899. He was promoted to lieutenant on 28 February 1900, and was later appointed the Adjutant of the Madras Volunteer Corps while serving in India.

== RAF career ==
Finding himself unsuited to regimental life, Webb-Bowen learnt to fly in 1912. After several weeks as a Royal Flying Corps flight commander, he was posted to the Central Flying School as an instructor where he later served as the Assistant Commandant.

In March 1915 Major Webb-Bowen took over command of No. 2 Squadron while the squadron was located at Merville, France. During his short tenure there were two significant events. Firstly, because of the difficulty suffered by ground troops in communicating their advance to higher command, a technique was developed whereby troops on the ground could convey their position by laying strips of white cloth on the ground. (These strips are referred to as "Popham strips" in a novel, and Webb-Bowen's predecessor was Robert Brooke-Popham.) Aircraft from No. 2 Squadron would then relay by WT the co-ordinates noted. The second and more historically significant event was the award of the first Victoria Cross awarded for bravery in the air, to Lieutenant William Rhodes-Moorhouse. Major Webb-Bowen handed over command to Major Becke in June 1915 following his posting to Home Establishment. He continued his war service commanding No. 3 Wing RFC from May 1915, and then as Brigadier-General Commanding first II Brigade RFC, then VII Brigade RFC and then II Brigade RFC again. He commanded these brigades in France and Italy.

After the war he was appointed Air Officer Commanding South Eastern Area and then Air Officer Commanding RAF India. He was appointed Air Officer Commanding No. 3 Group in 1923, Air Officer Commanding Inland Area in 1924 and Air Officer Commanding Middle East Command in 1925. He then went on to be Air Member for Personnel in 1930 and Air Officer Commanding Wessex Bombing Area in 1931 before retiring on 26 September 1933.

He was recalled during the Second World War to be Duty Air Commodore in the Operations Room at Headquarters Fighter Command.

Military offices
Preceded by Hugh Trenchard	Assistant Commandant of the Central Flying School; 7 August 1914 – 8 March 1915	Succeeded by Duncan Pitcher
Preceded by George Dawes	Officer Commanding No. 2 Squadron; 8 March – 27 May 1915	Succeeded by John Becke
Preceded by Robert Brooke-Popham	Officer Commanding No. 3 Wing; 27 May – 2 June 1915	Succeeded by John Higgins
Preceded by John Salmond	Brigadier-General Commanding II Brigade RFC; 1916–1917	Succeeded by John Becke
New title Brigade established	Brigadier-General Commanding VII Brigade RFC; 1917–1918	Brigade disbanded Title next held by Charles Lambe in 1918
Preceded by John Becke	Brigadier-General Commanding II Brigade RFC; 1918	Brigade disbanded
New title Formed from Indian Group	Air Officer Commanding RAF India; 1920–1922	Succeeded by Philip Game
Vacant Title last held by Arthur Longmore	Air Officer Commanding No. 3 Group; 1923–1924	Succeeded by Lionel Charlton
Preceded by Oliver Swann	Air Officer Commanding RAF Middle East; 1926–1929	Succeeded by Francis Scarlett
Preceded by Sir John Salmond	Air Member for Personnel; 1930–1931	Succeeded by Sir Edward Ellington
