= Charles Burke (British Army officer) =

British Army officer

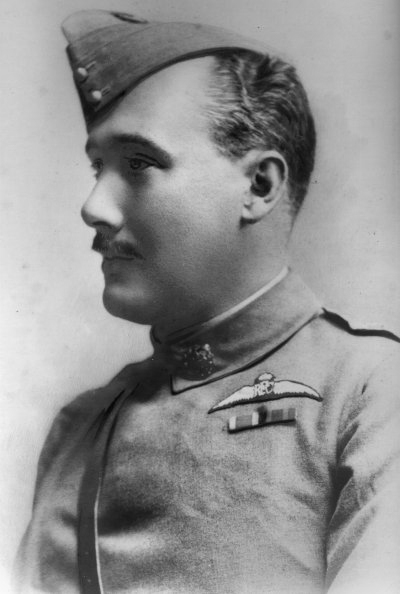
- Burke in the uniform of the Royal Flying Corps
- Born: 9 March 1882; Armagh, Ireland
- Died: 9 April 1917 (aged 35); Near Arras, France
- Military career
- Allegiance: United Kingdom
- Branch: British Army
- Rank: Lieutenant Colonel
- Nickname: Pregnant Percy
- Units: Royal Irish Regiment; Royal Flying Corps
- Commands: Second Wing; No. 2 Squadron RFC
- Conflicts: Second Boer War; First World War
- Awards: Distinguished Service Order

Lieutenant Colonel Charles James Burke DSO (9 March 1882 – 9 April 1917) was an officer in the Royal Irish Regiment and the Royal Flying Corps and a military aviation pioneer. He was both the first commander of No. 2 Squadron and later the Second Wing.

Charles Burke was the youngest son of Michael Charles Christopher Burke of Ballinhone House, Armagh, Ireland.

== Military career ==
Burke's military service in the British Army began when he commissioned as a second lieutenant in the 4th (Militia) Battalion of the Royal Dublin Fusiliers on 21 May 1900, then promoted lieutenant on 24 October 1900. He saw active service in the Second Boer War, for which he received the Queen's medal with two clasps. Following the end of the war in June 1902, he returned to the battalion in August, then went home to the United Kingdom with the battalion aboard Cestrian, which reached Southampton on 5 October. Later the same year he was commissioned into the regular army as a second lieutenant in the Royal Irish Regiment. After several years of regimental service, including three years with the West African Frontier Force, he was promoted to captain in September 1909. The following year Burke travelled to France where he learned to fly in a Farman biplane, gaining his Aéro-Club de France certificate in the process.

After his return to England, Burke was employed at the Army's Balloon School. In early 1911, Burke was involved in conducting heavier-than-air aircraft tests at the Balloon Factory. On 7 January 1911 Burke flew a Farman aircraft for two miles over Laffan's Plain at 50 to 80 feet and landed near the Balloon Factory. A few minutes later, Burke attempted a second flight. However, after only 50 yards he stalled and the aircraft came to earth on its right wing, cart-wheeled and disintegrated. Burke was injured in the crash. Despite this experience, Burke was not deterred from flying. In July of the same year, he flew from Salisbury Plain to Aldershot and back and later on he made a return flight to Oxford.

Burke was also one of the earliest British Army officers to consider air power in depth. In 1911, whilst serving as a captain in the Air Battalion, Burke wrote the first air power article to be published in the Royal United Services Institute Journal. In his article Burke compared the reconnaissance activities of cavalry to those of aircraft and observed that just as opposing cavalry might be drawn into battle, so could aircraft.

In 1912 Burke wrote his 29 maxims for flying:

1. Time in the air will alone make a pilot.
2. When training pilots, no machine should go out without knowing what it is to do, do it and it alone, then land.
3. When on the ground, everyone overrates their capacity for airwork.
4. No young pilot should be allowed out in "bumps" until he has done 15 hours piloting.
5. An aeroplane will live in the wind and a lifeboat in any sea, but they both want good and experienced men at the tiller.
6. Each smash means a certain amount of loss of the valuable assets: dash and keenness, though varying with individuals, the supply has its limits.
7. A pilot whose muscles are rigid when flying should do one of two things: (a) unstiffen (b) give up flying.
8. Napoleon said that in war the mental is to the physical as three to one. If he had known aviation, he would have put a nought after the three.
9. If the occupant of the passenger seat has no confidence in the pilot, there is probability of trouble. If it is the pilot who lacks confidence, the probability becomes a certainty.
10. In aviation, because a thing has been done without accident ten times is no guarantee that there will not be an accident on the eleventh.
11. The qualities mostly required by a pilot: confidence; by an observer: truth; by a rigger: reliability; and the first two are largely based on the last.
12. "Rumour is a lying jade". Aviation is full of rumours.
13. No pilots or anyone put over them will do any good if they listen to remarks actuated by jealousy.
14. Flying creates flying. If you see others up, the weather cannot be so bad as you imagined it was.
15. Divide pilots into classes. The weather will be fit for all of a class or none.
16. The amount of flying done does not depend on the weather but on the arrangements made to avail oneself of good weather.
17. Sufficient arrangements are seldom if ever made.
18. Aviation like arsenic can only be taken in small doses at first.
19. When things are going well, the man in charge can give play to his fears.
20. Nothing is ever as good or as bad as it seems.
21. Waiting about on an aerodrome has spoilt more pilots than everything else put together.
22. Strain can reduce the best of pilots by stages until it is just as dangerous for them to fly a machine as it is for a beginner.
23. Everyone who takes up flying becomes converted from disbelief into enthusiasm. Shortly after his conversion he may, or may not, kill himself.
24. Never regret having given a beginner too little flying at first, but always remember the time lost by want of arrangement.
25. If in doubt whether you should let beginners go up "Don't".
26. A military flier is only becoming really valuable after six months, which is about the time that a civilian flier lasts a star performer.
27. In aviation, all goes completely wrong or completely well. Neither should affect the man in charge as to what he intended to do.
28. If you know what you want, you can do your portion and get others to do theirs. Most people don't know what they want.
29. A Squadron Commander should want a good Squadron, and not be able to break records.

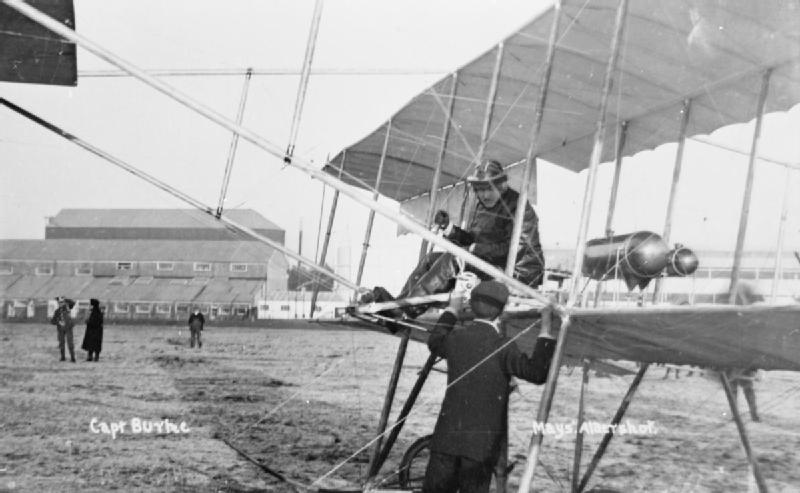
Burke in the cockpit of pre-World War I a pusher biplane.

On 13 May 1912, Burke became the commanding officer of the Flying Corps' No. 2 Squadron and was promoted to major. During the next two years, Burke trained his squadron in aerial reconnaissance. In September 1912, Burke took part in the Army Manoeuvres. Burke was responsible for the control of nine aircraft under the direction of Major Frederick Sykes.

On 13 February 1913, five aircraft of No. 2 Squadron took off from RAE Farnborough and in a series of stages over the next 13 days flew 450 miles (720 km) north. The aircraft landed at Upper Dysart Farm on 26 February, 3 miles (4.8 km) south of Montrose, Forfarshire, Scotland establishing the first operational military airbase in the United Kingdom.

== First World War ==
Burke (as a brevet major) was mentioned in Sir John French's despatch on 8 October 1914. The following month, on 29 November 1914, Burke was appointed the first commanding officer of No. 2 Wing of the Royal Flying Corps and he set up his headquarters at Saint-Omer. His wing comprised Nos 5 and 6 Squadrons. In 1915 Burke was involved in recruiting for the Royal Flying Corps in Canada. As well as directly recruiting personnel, Burke suggested that training aerodromes might be established in Canada under British control. From February to June 1916, Burke served as the Commandant of the Central Flying School.

In the summer of 1916 Burke rejoined his old regiment, the Royal Irish Regiment, which was suffering a severe shortage of officers. Burke was killed in action on 9 April 1917, whilst commanding the 1st Battalion of the East Lancashire Regiment. It was the first day of the Battle of Arras and he was visiting the right, front post of B Company when it was hit by a shell. Both Burke and his orderly, Lance Corporal R Pentland were killed. Burke is buried at the Point-du-Jour Military Cemetery, Athies, France in Plot: III. C. 2. His orderly is buried next to him.

Lieutenant-Colonel Burke DSO is remembered on the Men of Thomond Memorial at St Mary's Cathedral (Church of Ireland), Limerick City, Ireland.

Military offices
New title Post created	Officer Commanding No. 2 Squadron; 13 May 1912 – 10 November 1914	Succeeded by George William Patrick Dawes
New title Wing established	Officer Commanding 2nd Wing; 29 November 1914 – August 1915	Succeeded by John Salmond
Preceded by Duncan Pitcher	Commandant of the Central Flying School; 1 February – 18 June 1916	Succeeded by Archibald MacLean
