= Charles Longcroft =

Royal Air Force air vice marshal (1883–1958)

Air Vice-Marshal Sir Charles Longcroft KCB CMG DSO AFC
- Brigadier-General Charles Longcroft in 1916/17
- Born: 13 May 1883; Llanarth, Cardiganshire
- Died: 20 February 1958 (aged 74); Paddington, London
- Military career
- Allegiance: United Kingdom
- Branch: British Army (1902–18); Royal Air Force (1918–29)
- Service years: c. 1902–29
- Rank: Air Vice-Marshal
- Commands: Inland Area (1926–29); RAF Cranwell (1919–23); III Brigade RAF (1918); Training Division RFC (1917–18); V Brigade RFC (1916–17); 2nd Wing RFC (1916); No. 4 Squadron RFC (1915); No. 1 Squadron RFC (1914–15)
- Conflicts: First World War
- Awards: Knight Commander of the Order of the Bath; Companion of the Order of St Michael and St George; Distinguished Service Order; Air Force Cross; Mentioned in Despatches; Order of Saint Stanislaus, 3rd Class with Swords (Russia); Officer of the Legion of Honour (France)
- Other work: Gentleman Usher of the Scarlet Rod

Air Vice-Marshal Sir Charles Alexander Holcombe Longcroft, KCB, CMG, DSO, AFC (13 May 1883 – 20 February 1958) was a pilot and squadron commander in the Royal Flying Corps who went on to become a senior commander in the Royal Air Force. He was the first commandant of the RAF College, Cranwell.

== Early years ==
Charles Alexander Holcombe Longcroft was born on 13 May 1883 in Cardiganshire, Wales, the third of four children born to Charles Edward Longcroft (1842–1892) and his wife, Catherine Alicia Holcombe. The Longcrofts had originated in Wiltshire but first rose to prominence as merchants in Hampshire in the 18th century. Charles' somewhat distinguished great-grandfather, Captain Edward Longcroft RN (c.1750–1812), had settled in Wales in the mid-1780s after returning from a lengthy period of service in the West Indies during the American War of Independence. Charles' father inherited the Llanina estate in 1888 but after his death only four years later the estate passed in trust to his nine-year-old son.

Charles Longcroft was educated at Charterhouse, attended the Royal Military College, Sandhurst, before May 1903 and was then commissioned into the Welch Regiment. After obtaining his Royal Aero Club certificate in March 1912, Longcroft was attached to the Air Battalion of the Royal Engineers at his request. With the establishment of the Royal Flying Corps in the following month, he was seconded to the new Corps.

== First World War ==
By 1914, Longcroft had been promoted to major and was appointed Officer Commanding No. 1 Squadron RFC. For the next year and a half, apart from a brief period as a supernumerary, Longcroft was the squadron commander of either No. 1 Squadron or No. 4 Squadron RFC. During the period 1915 to 1918, he was promoted several times and had command of the RFC's Training Wing, 2nd Wing, V Brigade and Training Division. Longcroft finished the war as General Officer Commanding the 3rd Brigade.

== Royal Air Force commander ==
With the establishment of the Royal Air Force on 1 April 1918, Longcroft transferred to the new service on a temporary basis. In March 1919 he succeeded Philip Game as commander of South-West Area. On 1 August 1919, he resigned his commission in the Welch Regiment and was awarded a permanent RAF commission in the rank of group captain. Just four days later he was promoted to air commodore.

On 1 November 1919, Longcroft was appointed as the first commandant of the world's first air academy, the RAF (Cadet) College at Cranwell. The first intake of cadets arrived on the following February and his post was upgraded to Air Officer Commanding RAF Cranwell. He became Director-General of Personal Services in 1923 and Air Officer Commanding, Inland Area in 1926 before retiring from the RAF at his own request on 2 November 1929.

== Later years ==
On 27 April 1921 he married the widowed Marjory Hepburn, née McKerrell-Brown, and together they had a son, Charles McKerrell Longcroft, who was born in 1926.

He was appointed a Companion of the Order of the Bath (CB) in the 1923 Birthday Honours.

From 1932 Longcroft was appointed Gentleman Usher of the Scarlet Rod of the Order of the Bath, before being appointed Registrar and Secretary of the Order of the Bath in 1948. He was appointed a Knight Companion of the Order of the Bath (KCB) in the 1938 Birthday Honours.

Longcroft died in London on 20 February 1958. His widow, Lady Longcroft, died in 1964.

Military offices
Preceded by Edward Maitland	Officer Commanding No. 1 Squadron RFC; 1914–1915	Succeeded by Geoffrey Salmond
Preceded by H R P Reynolds	Officer Commanding No. 4 Squadron RFC; January–July 1915	Succeeded by F F Waldron
Vacant Title last held by J M Salmond	Brigadier General Commanding V Brigade RFC; 1916-1917	Succeeded by L E O Charlton
Preceded by John Salmond	General Officer Commanding the Training Division RFC; 1917–1918	Succeeded by Edgar Ludlow-Hewitt
Preceded by John Higgins	Brigadier-General Commanding III Brigade RAF; April–December 1918	Brigade disbanded
Preceded by A C Critchley; As General Officer Commanding RAF Cadet Brigade	Commandant RAF College; 1919–1923	Succeeded by Amyas Borton
Preceded by Sir Tom Webb-Bowen	Air Officer Commanding Inland Area; 1926–1929	Succeeded by Amyas Borton
Honorary titles
Preceded by Richard Stapleton-Cotton	Gentleman Usher of the Scarlet Rod; 1932–1948	Succeeded by Douglas Wimberley
Awards
New title Award established	Recipient of the Royal Aero Club Britannia Trophy; 1913	Succeeded by J W Sedden
