= General Cooke =

General Cooke may refer to:

- George Cooke (British Army officer) (1766–1837), British Army major general
- Henry Frederick Cooke (c. 1783–1837), British Army major general
- John Rogers Cooke (1833–1891), Confederate States Army brigadier general
- Philip St. George Cooke (1809–1895), Union Army brigadier general and brevet major general
- Ronald Cooke (British Army officer) (1899–1971), British Army major general
- Thomas Cooke (British Army officer) (1841–1912), British Army general

== See also ==
- James Cooke-Collis (1876–1941), British Army major general
- General Cook (disambiguation)
