= Edward Ashmore (British Army officer) =

British Army officer (1872–1953)

Major-General Edward Ashmore CB CMG MVO
- Ashmore in Royal Flying Corps uniform as commander of the London Air Defences
- Born: 20 February 1872; Paddington, London
- Died: 5 October 1953 (aged 81); Arundel, Sussex
- Military career
- Allegiance: United Kingdom
- Branch: British Army (1891–1918, 1919–1929); Royal Air Force (1918–1919)
- Service years: 1891–1929
- Rank: Major-General
- Nickname: Splash
- Units: Royal Artillery; Royal Flying Corps
- Commands: Territorial Army Air Defence Brigades (1924–1929); 1st Air Defence Brigade (1920–1924); London Air Defence Area (1917–1920); IV Brigade RFC (1916–1917); I Brigade RFC (1916); First Wing RFC (1915); Administration Wing RFC (1914–1915)
- Conflicts: Second Boer War; First World War; Second World War
- Awards: Companion of the Order of the Bath; Companion of the Order of St Michael and St George; Member of the Royal Victorian Order; Commander of the Legion of Honour (France)

Major-General Edward Bailey Ashmore, CB, CMG, MVO (20 February 1872 – 5 October 1953) was a British Army officer from the 1890s to the 1920s who served in the Royal Artillery, the Royal Flying Corps and briefly in the Royal Air Force before founding and developing the organisation that would become the Royal Observer Corps.

== Early life ==
Ashmore was born on 20 February 1872 at the family home which was located near Hyde Park, London to Marion (nee Bailey) and Fitzroy Paley Ashmore. His father was a barrister who died in 1883 while Ashmore was still a child. Ashmore was the eldest child, with a brother and two sisters.

Ashmore was educated at Eton College. At some point he acquired the nickname "Splash".

== Career ==
=== Early career ===
Following graduation from Royal Military Academy, Woolwich, Ashmore was commissioned into the Royal Regiment of Artillery as a second lieutenant on 24 July 1891, and promoted to lieutenant on 24 July 1894. He was posted to 'Q' Battery Royal Horse Artillery and served during the Second Boer War in South Africa. Promoted to captain on augmentation of the regiment on 13 February 1900, he was severely wounded at Sanna's Post during the relief of Kimberley on 31 March 1900.

In 1904, Ashmore served as an adjutant in the Royal Horse Artillery and attended Staff College, Camberley, in January 1906. Appointed as a staff officer on the Army General Staff. He was promoted to major in April 1909 and was returned to the establishment of the Royal Artillery. He served as a General Staff Officer 3rd Grade (GSO3) on the General Staff (War Office) and later as a 2nd Grade (GSO2).

While at the War Office became interested in aviation and at the age of 40 learnt to fly at Brooklands, gaining Royal Aero Club certificate no. 281 in 1912.

In September 1913, Ashmore was appointed Assistant Military Secretary to the Inspector-General of the Overseas Forces and General Officer Commanding-in-Chief Mediterranean Command. On 22 January 1913, he was appointed to the reserve of the Royal Flying Corps (RFC).

=== World War I ===
On 18 November 1914 he was appointed Officer Commanding Administration Wing, RFC, and on 10 May 1915 as commander of 1st Wing RFC with the rank of lieutenant colonel. Promoted to brigadier general in January 1916, he took command of the I Brigade, RFC, transferring to the newly established IV Brigade on 1 April.

On 20 December 1916, still as a Temporary Brigadier-General, Ashmore was appointed Commander, Royal Artillery, of 29th Division. He commanded 29th Divisional Artillery during the fighting on the Somme in January and February 1917, for which he was Mention in Despatches. He had been promoted to brevet Colonel from 1 January. He continued in command of 29th DA during the Battle of Arras in April and May.

=== Air defence of London ===
On 28 July 1917 he left 29th Division to take up an appointment as Commander of the London Air Defence Area with the rank of Temporary Major-General and as a result became a leading figure in the air defence of the United Kingdom. At the time of his appointment Ashmore expressed the view that he was swapping the "comparative safety of the Front for the probability of being hanged in the streets of London".

In his new role Ashmore was responsible for implementing improved systems of detection, communication and control. In particular a system called the Metropolitan Observation Service was created which covered the London area. This was soon extended towards the coasts of Kent and Essex. The system met with some success and although it was not fully working until late summer 1918 (the last air raid took place on 19 May). The lessons learnt were to provide valuable grounding for later developments.

He continued in this command until the end of the war.

=== Interwar ===
When the Royal Flying Corps amalgamated with the Royal Naval Air Service to form the Royal Air Force (RAF) in April 1918, Ashmore still held the rank of T/Maj-Gen. He was re-graded to Air Vice Marshal on 1 August 1919 (backdated to 19 April 1918) until he resigned his RAF commission on 1 September 1919.

Ashmore reverted to the army as a colonel and was appointed commander of the Regular Army's 1st Air Defence Brigade in Aldershot Command on 8 December 1920. He was promoted to substantive Maj-Gen on 1 January 1924 and appointed General Officer Commanding Territorial Army Air Defence Brigades and Inspector of Regular Anti-Aircraft Defences on 1 March 1924. In 1922, overall responsibility for air defence was transferred from the War Office, which was responsible for the Army, to the Air Ministry. Ashmore, who had been responsible for matters during the First World War, now reported to a new Air Raid Precautions (ARP) committee set up in January 1924. Experiments were now carried out around Romney Marsh and the Weald. These were intended to optimise the arrangement of observation posts and control centres. In 1925 these experiments were extended to cover parts of Essex and Hampshire and by October a sound methodology had been worked out. On 29 October 1925 the Royal Observer Corps came into official existence.

Within a year four Groups existed in Southeast England, covering much of Kent, Sussex, Hampshire and Essex. The plan was that the country would be covered by 18 of these groups. The involvement and cooperation of the RAF, the Army, the British police forces and the General Post Office (GPO) (then responsible for the national telephone system), was required. Ashmore was regarded as the first commander of the Observer Corps in all but name during 1925 and he is deemed to be the Corps' founder.

=== Retirement ===
Ashmore retired in 1929 and in that same year Longmans, Green and Company published his book, Air Defence in which he described his theories on the subject.

During World War II Ashmore raised and commanded a battalion of the Home Guard, by which time he was over 70 years of age.

Ashmore died at the age of 81 at his home on 5 October 1953.

== Personal life ==
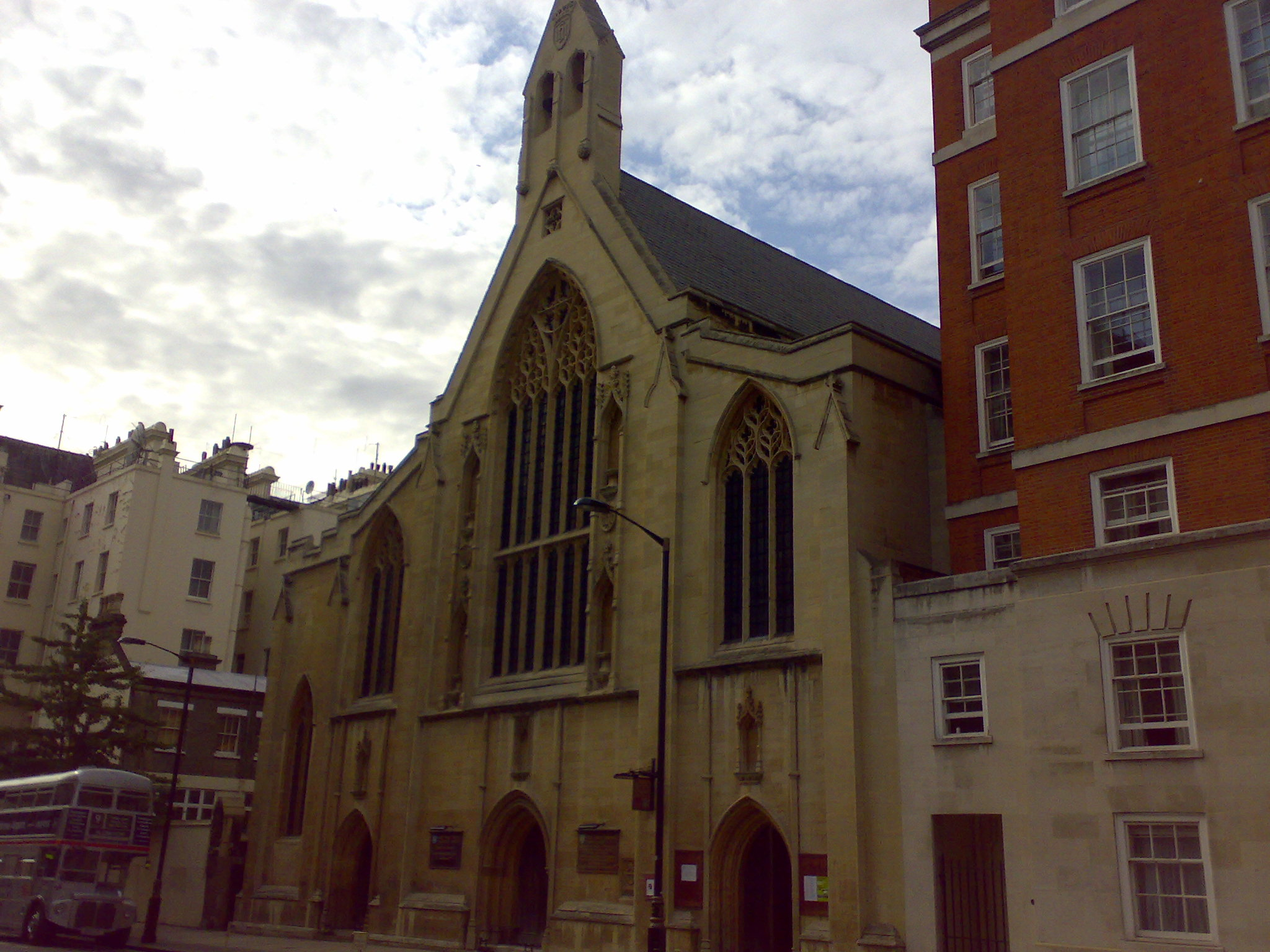
The church of Holy Trinity, Prince Consort Road, where Ashmore was married in 1919.

Ashmore married Betty Doreen Violet Parsons at Holy Trinity Church, Prince Consort Road on 17 July 1919. The couple had no children.

Following his retirement from military service the Ashmores lived at 30 Maltravers Street in Arundel, Sussex. Betty Ashmore died in 1986, at the age of 87.

His brother, Geoffrey William Paley Ashmore served as a Royal Engineers officer in the First World War and died when transport ship Transylvania was torpedoed in the Gulf of Genoa off north western Italy on 4 May 1917.

== Notes ==
Military offices
Preceded by Hugh Trenchard; As Officer Commanding the Military Wing	Officer Commanding the Administrative Wing, RFC; 1914–1915	Succeeded by John Salmond
Preceded by Hugh Trenchard	Officer Commanding 1st Wing RFC; 10 May – 1 November 1915	Succeeded by John Becke
New title Brigade established	Brigadier-General Commanding I Brigade RFC; January–April 1916	Succeeded by Duncan le Geyt Pitcher
New title Brigade established	Brigadier-General Commanding IV Brigade RFC; 1916–1917	Succeeded by John Becke
