= Central Flying School =

British Royal Air Force pilot school

Coordinates: 53.0314°N 0.4934°W

- School badge
- Active: 12 May 1912 – present
- Country: United Kingdom
- Branch: Royal Air Force
- Type: Flying training school
- Role: Instructor training and flying training oversight
- Part of: Directorate of Flying Training
- Stations: RAF Cranwell (Headquarters); RAF Shawbury (Helicopters Squadron)
- Motto: Imprimis praecepta (Latin for 'Our teaching is everlasting')

Commanders
- Current commander: Group Captain Martin Higgins

The Central Flying School (CFS) is the Royal Air Force's primary institution for the training of military flying instructors. Established in 1912 at the Upavon Aerodrome, it is the longest existing flying training school in the world. The school was based at RAF Little Rissington from 1946 to 1976. Its motto is Imprimis Praecepta, Latin for "The Teaching is Everlasting".

The school currently manages a series of training squadrons and the RAF Display Team.

== History ==
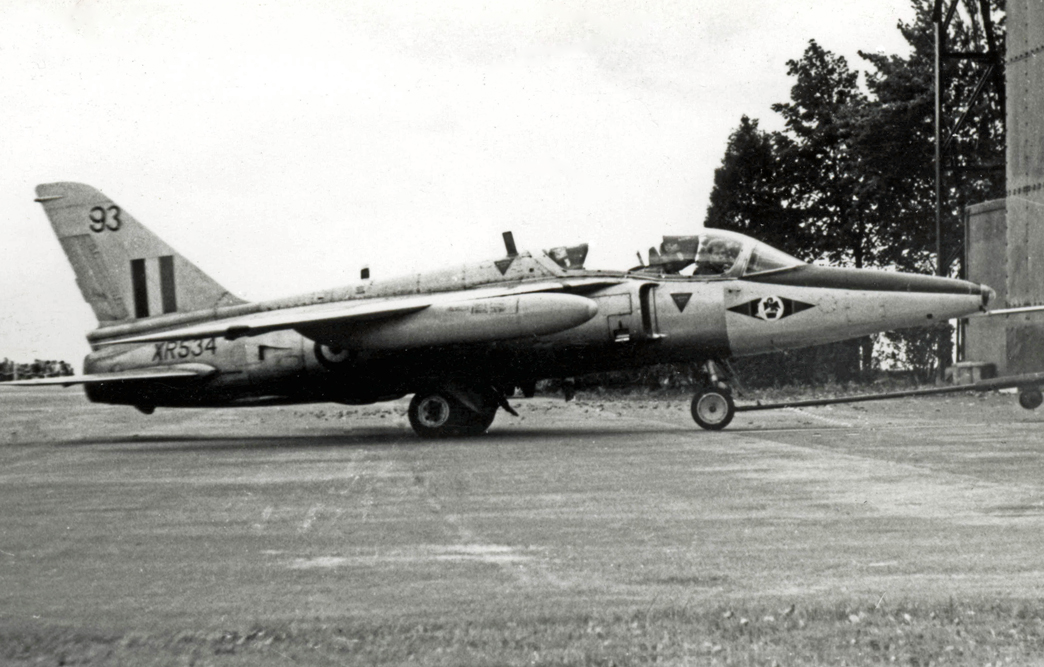
CFS Folland Gnat advanced trainer at RAF Little Rissington, 1967

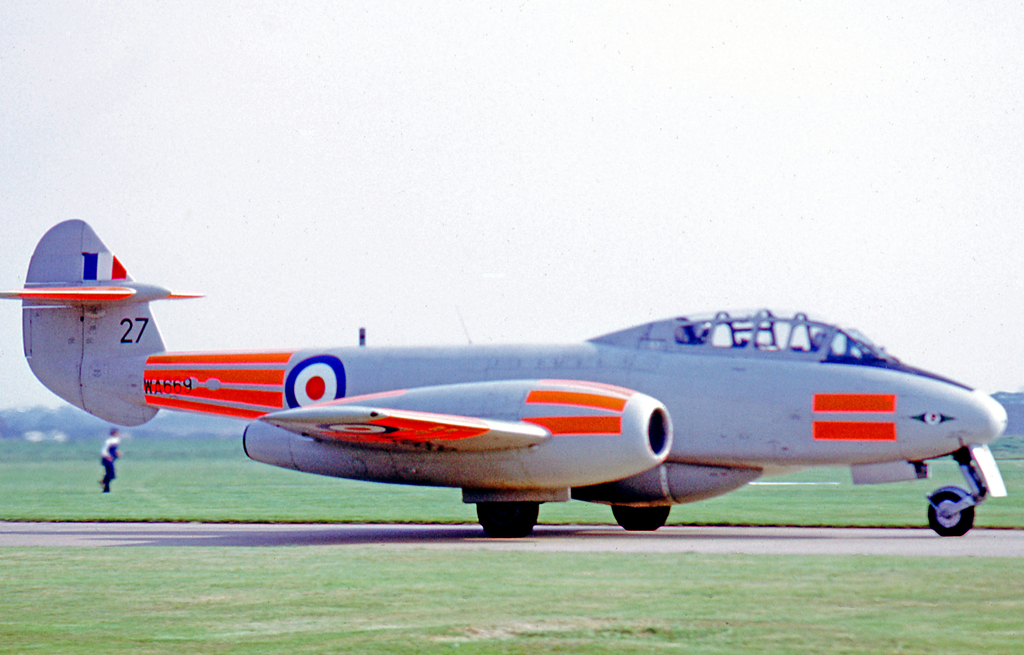
CFS Gloster Meteor T.7 at RAF Coltishall, 1969

The Central Flying School was established by the Royal Navy at Upavon Aerodrome, near Upavon, Wiltshire, on 12 May 1912. The school's strength at the outset was ten Staff Officers and eighty flying students, whose course lasted for sixteen weeks. Its first commandant was Captain Godfrey Paine RN, and it also trained pilots for the Royal Flying Corps, created in 1912, and the Royal Naval Air Service, 1914–1918. The school was transferred from the Southern Training Bridge to HQ Training Division on 5 January 1918 and was redesignated Flying Instructors School RAF on 23 December 1919. The school was reformed on 26 April 1920 and it has been responsible for instructor training since 1920, with pilot training being delegated to the Flying Training Schools.

On 7 October 1926, the school moved from Upavon to RAF Wittering, but on 30 August 1935 it returned to Upavon Due to the Second World War the school was redesignated as No. 7 Flying Instructors School RAF on 1 April 1942. The school was reformed from the disbandment of the Empire Central Flying School RAF on 7 May 1946 at RAF Little Rissington.

On 1 January 1951 it consisted of:
RAF Little Rissington	RAF South Cerney	RAF Moreton-in-Marsh
Ground Training Squadron	Ground Training Squadron	Harvard Squadron
No. 1 Harvard Squadron	No. 1 Prentice Squadron	Re-entrant Pre-CFS
No. 2 Harvard Squadron	No. 2 Prentice Squadron	
Meteor Flight	Reserve QFI Refresher Flight	
Examining Wing		

Between May 1952 and 1 June 1957 the CFS was split into two, assets at Little Rissington became CFS (Advanced) with assets at South Cerney becoming CFS (Basic) by renumbering No. 2 Flying Training School RAF. On 1 November 1954 the school was transferred to No. 81 Group RAF. On 12 April 1976 the school moved to RAF Cranwell for the first time, only staying until 5 September 1977 when it moved to RAF Leeming. It then moved to RAF Scampton on 19 September 1984 and finally back to Cranwell on 31 May 1995 as part of No. 3 Flying Training School RAF

The school used various airfields as relief landing grounds such as: High Post, Alton Barnes, Overton Heath, New Zealand Farm, Manningford, Enstone, Wellesbourne Mountford, Aston Down, Kemble and RAF Fairford.

During January 1996, the Central Flying School museum moved from RAF Scampton to RAF Cranwell, where it had been based since 1985.

=== Display teams ===
In 1964 the Central Flying School at RAF Little Rissington became responsible for the provision of the Royal Air Force Aerobatic Team. This responsibility had previously been held by Fighter Command. The 'Red Pelicans' equipped with six Mk 4 Jet Provosts were given the honour of this role and became The 1964 RAF Premier Aerobatic Team. The team displayed in the UK, France, Belgium, Denmark, and Norway.

During 1964 RAF Valley formed a team of five Gnats named 'The Yellow Jacks". It was decided that the Gnat team would become the Premier Team for 1965. In preparation for the handover the Red Pelicans and the Yellowjacks performed combined displays at the 1964 Farnborough Airshow.

The Yellowjacks were repainted red, and in 1965 the team was renamed the Red Arrows.

=== Elementary flying training ===
The Primary Flying Squadron moved from South Cerney to Church Fenton on 16 January 1967.

The squadron started using de Havilland Chipmunk T.10 and Scottish Aviation Bulldog T.1 while Bulldog Squadron moved to Cranwell on 31 March 1995 and became part of No. 3 Flying Training School RAF. In 2000 the Grob Tutor T.1 replaced the Scottish Aviation Bulldog as the initial trainer operated by the squadron.

=== Fast jet training ===
The training started on 1 October 1955 at Kemble as the Type Flight evolving into the Type Squadron on 10 July 1957 with a:

- Hawker Hunter Flight at Kemble
- English Electric Canberra Flight at Little Rissington
- Gloster Meteor Flight at Little Rissington
- Communication Flight at Little Rissington

The Folland Gnat T.1 was added and initially used at Fairford before moving to Kemble, with the Jet Provost moving from Fairford to Aston Down from 1966. The Hawker Siddeley Hawk T.1 was added and became No. 19 (Reserve Squadron) RAF on 1 October 1994.

During 1976 the Folland Gnat T.1s were based at RAF Valley however during 1977 these were replaced as the CFS main advanced jet trainer by the Hawker Siddeley Hawk T.1.

From 1992 the Short Tucano T.1 took the place of the BAC Jet Provost. The Tucano Squadron moved to RAF Topcliffe on 24 April 1995.

The Refresher Flying Flight was formed during April 1984 at Church Fenton operating the Jet Provost and moved to Scampton during 1991 but was disbanded during 1992. The flight was re-established on 24 April 1995 within the Tucano Squadron at Topcliffe. The first Shorts Tucano was delivered to the CFS on 1 September 1988.

=== Helicopter training ===
Helicopter instruction began on 8 March 1954 at RAF Middle Wallop as the CFS Helicopter Flight. The flight used the Westland Dragonfly and Bristol Sycamore at RAF South Cerney in Gloucestershire from 18 June 1955 until 1 June 1957 when it moved to Little Rissington. It moved to RAF Tern Hill in August 1961. From 1966, the Westland-built Sioux helicopter began service, lasting until 1973, when replaced with the more modern Westland Gazelle HT.2s. During the 1970s the Westland Whirlwind HAR.10s were also used and the school had a detachment at RAF Valley, Anglesey, Wales for SAR and mountain rescue training.

During 1974 it consisted of: No. 1 Squadron with Gazelles No. 2 Squadron teaching Advanced Training No. 3 Squadron teaching SAR training at Valley

No. 2 Squadron was renamed to No. 2 (Advanced) Flying Training School RAF (2 AFTS) while at Tern Hill during February 1974 with Whirlwinds. On 29 September 1976 the Helicopter Flight and No. 2 AFTS joined to form No. 2 Flying Training School RAF at Shawbury with No. 3 Squadron at Valley becoming No. 2 SAR Training Squadron.

In 1997 the Gazelle HT.2's and HT.3's were replaced by the Eurocopter Squirrel HT.1 and the Bell Griffin HT.1. RAF Shawbury has been the home of the helicopter training school since 1977, becoming the Defence Helicopter Flying School in 1997. A satellite unit of the CFS is maintained at RAF Shawbury to train and develop helicopter instructors.

The CFS also used other aircraft:

- Airspeed Oxford, Auster T.7, Avro 504K, Avro 504N, Avro Tutor, Bristol Bulldog TM, de Havilland Tiger Moth, de Havilland Mosquito T.3, de Havilland Vampire T.11, Gloster Grebe (DC), Hawker Tomtit, Hawker Hart Trainer, Hunting Percival Provost, Miles Magister I, Miles Master, North American Harvard, Percival Prentice T.1, Vickers Varsity T.1.

== Current training squadrons ==
Under the new UK Military Flying Training System, provided by Ascent Flight Training, a consortium of Lockheed Martin and Babcock International, new aircraft will be procured for the pipeline:

UK military aircrew from all three services start their flying careers with elementary flying training:

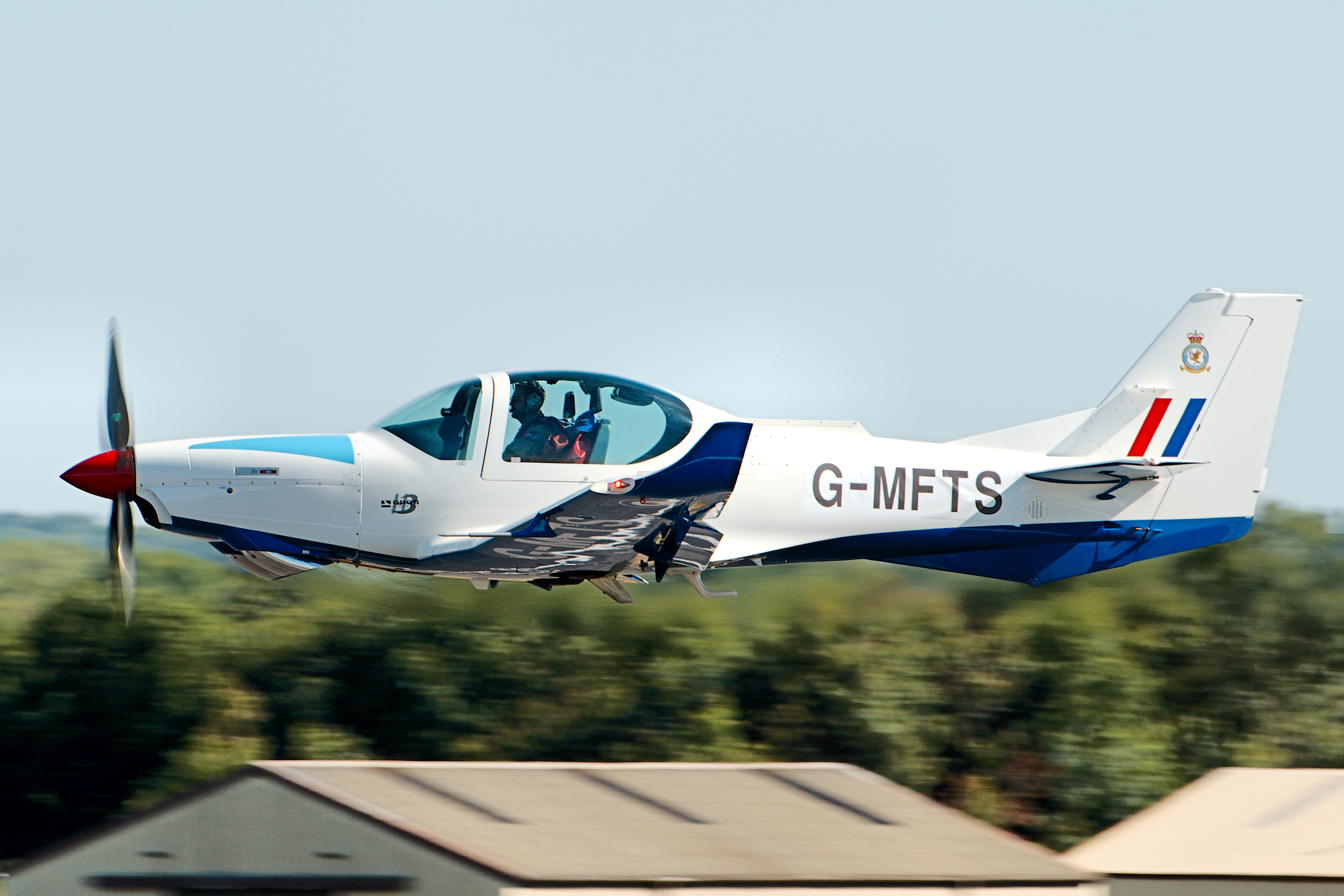
Prefect T1 used by UKMFTS

- Grob Prefect T.1 (RAF Cranwell/RAF Barkston Heath)
  - No. 57 Squadron – Elementary Flight Training (EFT)
  - 703 Naval Air Squadron – Elementary Flying Training (EFT)
- Grob Tutor T.1 (RAF Cranwell/RAF Wittering)
  - No. 16 Squadron – Legacy Elementary Flight Training (EFT)
  - No. 115 Squadron – training of QFI Instructors for EFT and UAS/AEF squadrons

Following EFT, aircrew students are streamed to either fast jet, rotary-wing or multi-engine pipelines.

=== Fast jet ===
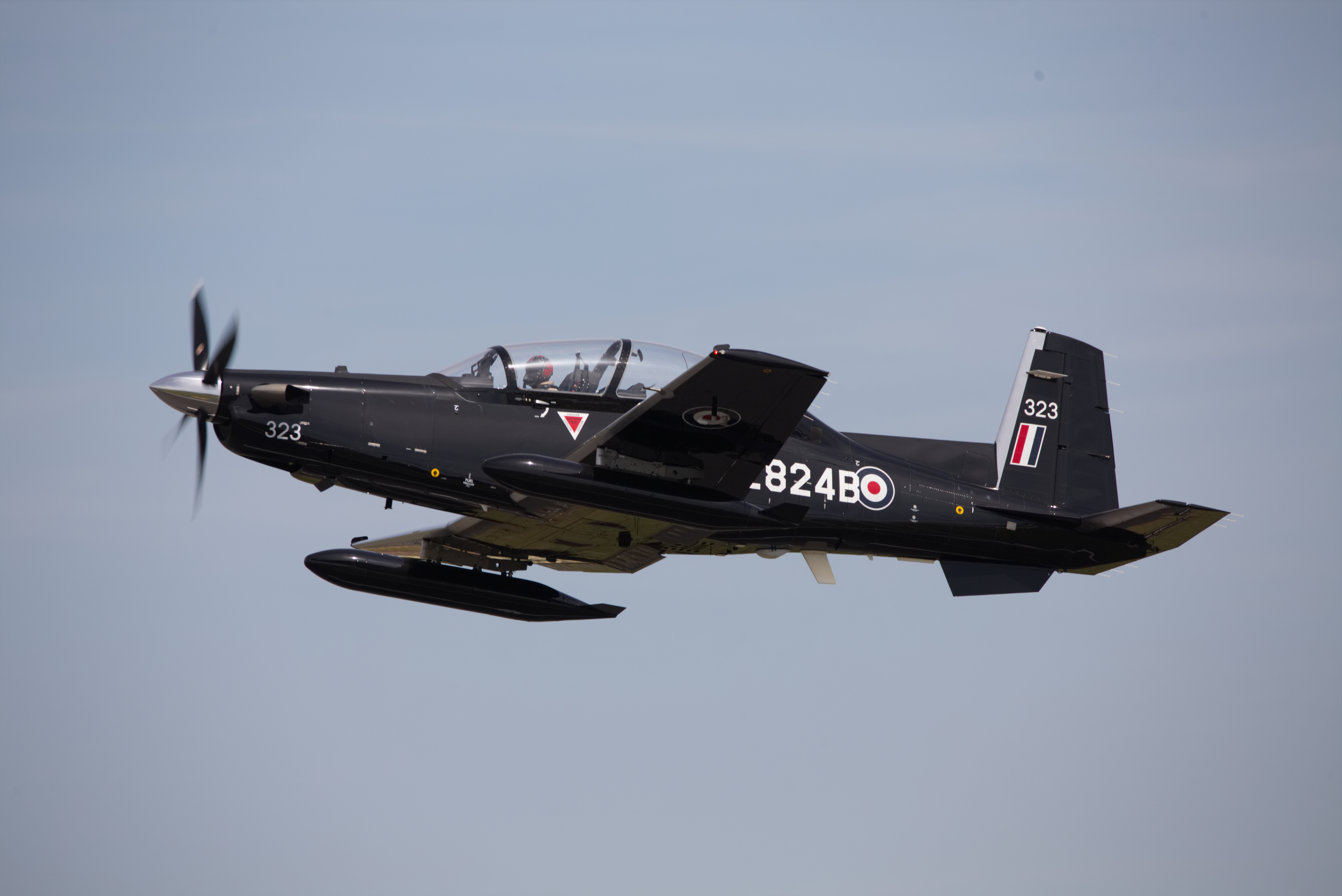
T6 Texan-II, used under the UKMFTS contract.

- Beechcraft T-6C Texan II – (RAF Valley)
  - 72 Squadron – Basic Fast Jet Training (BFJT)
- BAE Systems Hawk T.2 – (RAF Valley)
  - 4 Squadron – Advanced Fast Jet and Tactics Training

Following Fast Jet training, successful students go on to the Eurofighter Typhoon FGR.4 or Lockheed Martin F-35B Lightning II.

=== Multi-engine ===
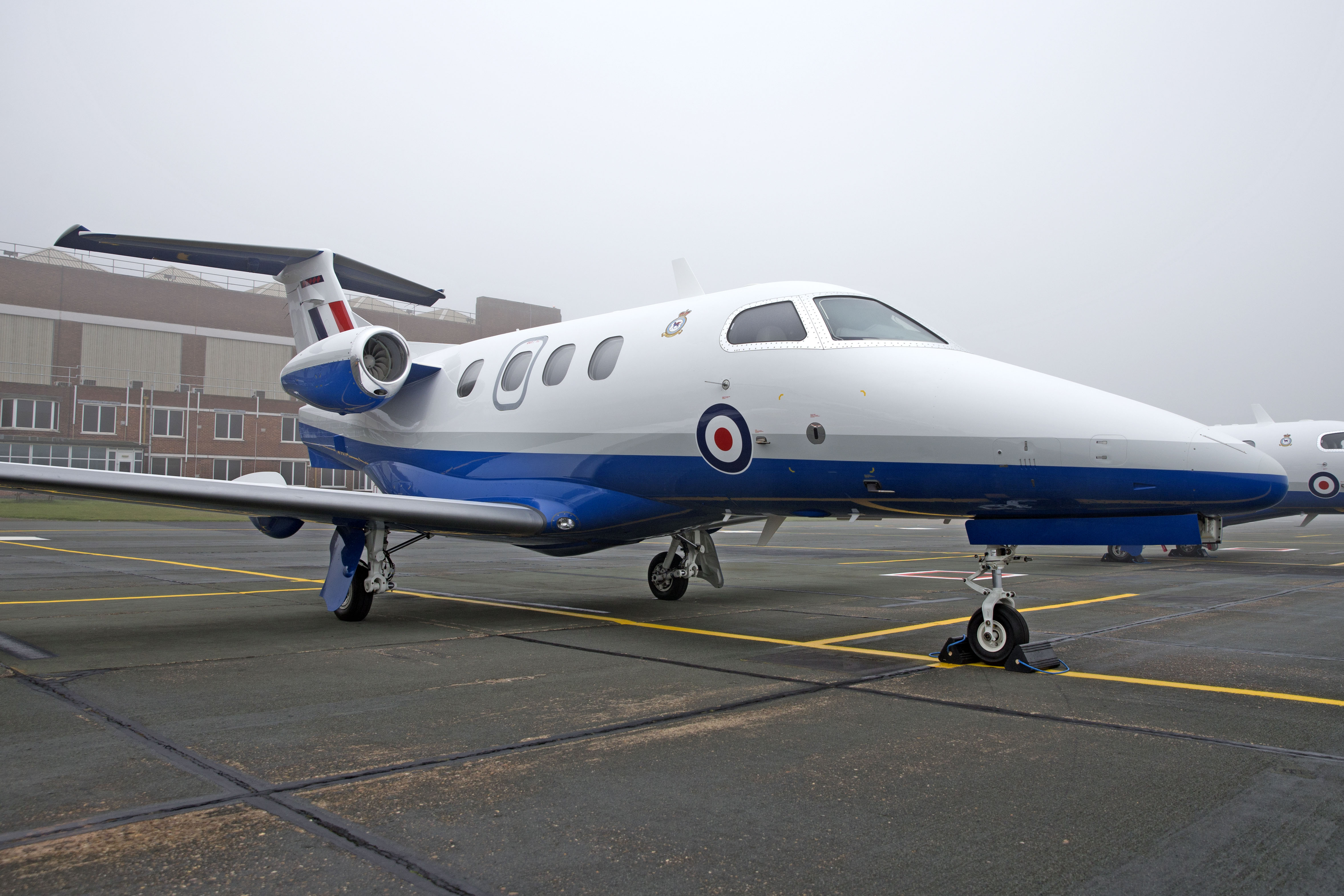
Phenom 100 used under the UKMFTS contract.

- Embraer Phenom T.1 – (RAF Cranwell)
  - No. 45 Squadron RAF – Multi-Engine training.

Multi Engine students will go on to fly the Boeing C-17A Globemaster III, Airbus Atlas C.1 or Airbus Voyager KC.2/3 transport aircraft or ISTAR assets like the Beechcraft Shadow R.1 or Boeing RC-135 Rivet Joint.

=== Rotary wing ===
No. 1 Flying Training School (replaced Defence Helicopter Flying School in 2020).

- Airbus Helicopters Juno HT.1 – (RAF Shawbury)
  - 660 Squadron Army Air Corps – Basic Rotary Training: 660 AAC and 705 NAS take alternate intakes from all three services
  - 705 Naval Air Squadron
  - No. 60 Squadron – Advanced and Tactical rotary training
- Airbus Helicopters Jupiter HT.1 – (RAF Valley)
  - No. 202 Squadron – Advanced Helicopter training (Maritime and Mountain flying)

RAF rotary wing students stream onto the Boeing CH-47 Chinook HC.4/5/6/6A.

=== Future system ===
- Advanced Fast Jet Training: BAe Systems Hawk T.2, already in service at RAF Valley
  - 4 Squadron
  - 25 Squadron

== Training ==
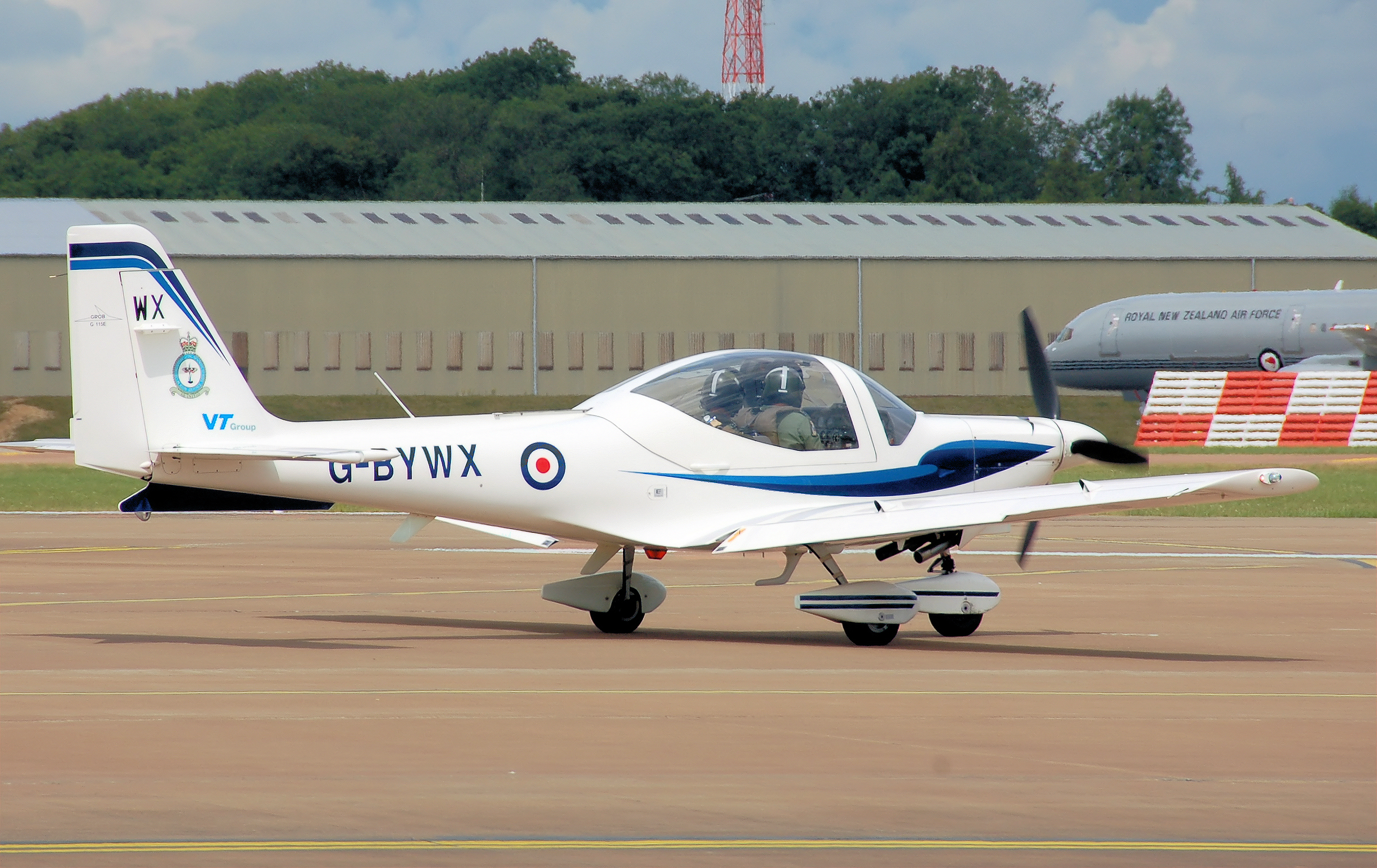
Grob Tutor

Suitable pilots are trained as Qualified Flying Instructor (QFIs) on the Grob Tutor T.1, Grob Prefect T.1 and Embraer Phenom T.1 at RAF College Cranwell. Texan and Hawk QFI's are trained by CFS personnel at RAF Valley. Helicopter instructors (QHI's), both pilots and rear crew, are trained at RAF Shawbury, home of No. 1 Flying Training School.

Flying instructors are awarded the Qualified Flying Instructor qualification for fixed-wing types. Helicopter instructors are referred to as Qualified Helicopter Instructors (QHI) or Qualified Helicopter Crewman Instructors (QHCI).

== Commandants ==
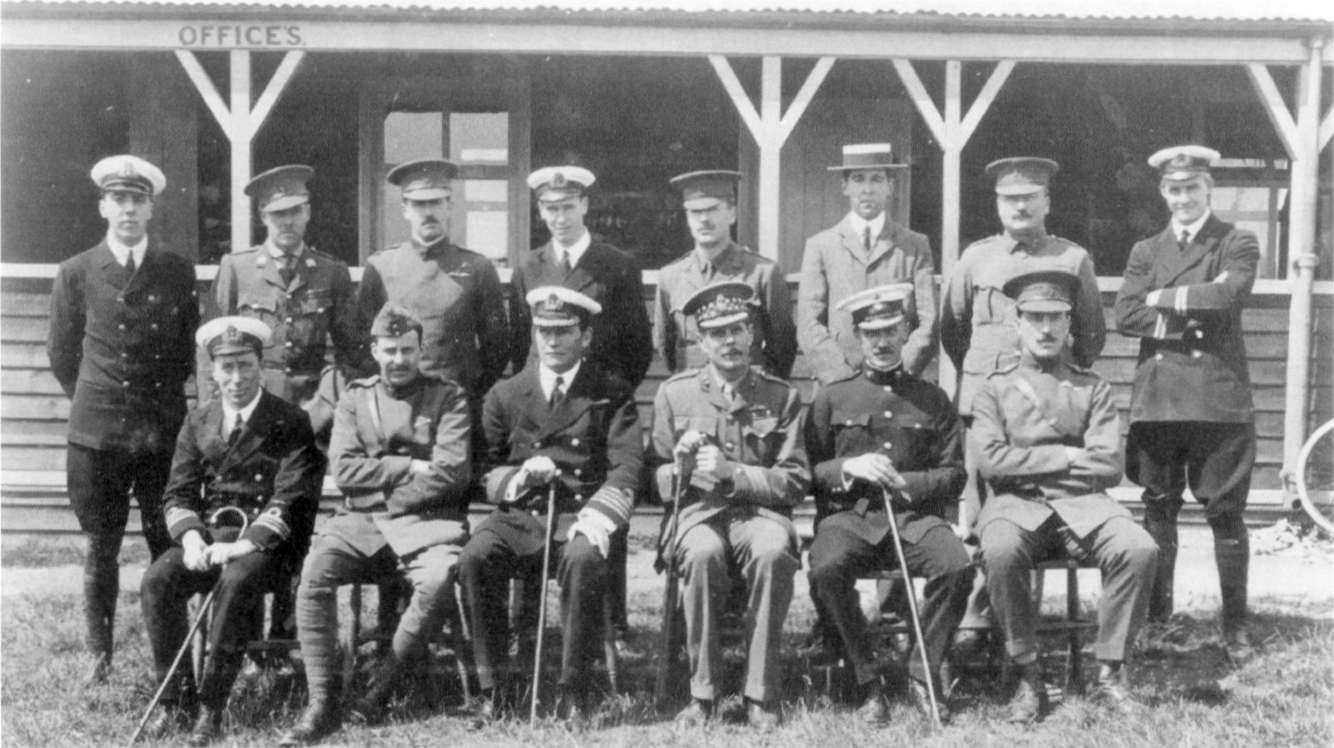
Central Flying School staff in January 1913

Ranks given are the highest rank the officer in command held during his tenure.

1912 to 1919

- 19 June 1912 Captain G. M. Paine RN
- 15 November 1915 Lieutenant-Colonel D. le G Pitcher
- 1 February 1916 Colonel C. J. Burke
- 18 June 1916 Lieutenant-Colonel A. C. H. MacLean
- 1917 Lieutenant-Colonel A. J. L. Scott

1919 to 1920 (as Commandant, Flying Instructors' School)

- 17 January 1919 Lieutenant-Colonel P. H. L. Playfair
- 7 April 1919 Lieutenant-Colonel (later Wing Commander) C. D. Breese

1920 to 1944

- 3 May 1920 Wing Commander Norman MacEwen
- 1922 Air Commodore Edward Masterman
- 1 January 1923 Group Captain Felton Holt
- 22 April 1925 Group Captain Wilfrid Freeman
- 24 January 1927 Group Captain (later Air Commodore) C. S. Burnett
- 17 December 1928 Wing Commander (later Group Captain) J. E. A. Baldwin
- 19 January 1932 Group Captain Paul Maltby
- July 1935 Wing Commander (later Group Captain) Harry George Smart
- 14 December 1936 Group Captain James Robb
- 17 March 1940 Group Captain Harold Down
- 1944 Claude Vincent

1946 to present

- 1946 Group Captain E.A.C Britton
- 1946 Group Captain W.M.L MacDonald
- 1948 Group Captain G.D. Stephenson
- 1950 Group Captain G.T. Jarman
- 1951 Air Commodore Anthony Selway
- 1954 Air Commodore G.J.C Paul
- 1956 Air Commodore N.C. Hyde
- 1958 Air Commodore J.H.N. Whitworth
- 1961 Air Commodore Hugh P. Connolly
- 1963 Air Commodore Harold Bird-Wilson
- 1965 Air Commodore F.L. Dodd
- 1968 Air Commodore Ivor Broom
- 1970 Air Commodore Freddie Hazlewood
- 1972 Air Commodore R.H. Crompton
- 1974 Air Commodore John Severne
- 1976 Air Commodore J.M.D. Sutton

1979 Air Commodore Dennis Allison

- 1983 John Kemball
- 1985 Air Commodore Allan Blackley
- Air Commodore David Leppard
- 1994 Air Commodore Simon Bostock
- 1996 Air Commodore Gavin Mackay
- 2007 Group Captain Nick Seward
- 2009 Group Captain Simon Blake
- 2012 Group Captain David Bentley
- 2014 Group Captain Jamie Hunter
- 2016 Group Captain Fin Monahan
- 2018 Group Captain Anthony R Franklin
- 2020 Group Captain Martin Higgins
- 2022 Group Captain Mike Jordan

Assistant Commandants

- 1912 Lieutenant Colonel Henry Cook
- 23 September 1913 Lieutenant Colonel Hugh Trenchard
- 7 August 1914 Major, later Lieutenant Colonel, Tom Webb-Bowen
- 6 March 1915 Lieutenant Colonel D. Le G Pitcher

== Notable former instructors ==
- Air Marshal Sir Richard Atcherley (1925–28)
- Wing Commander Clive Beadon (1940)
- Air Marshal Sir Lawrence Pendred (1924–30)
- Air Chief Marshal Sir James Robb (1927–30)
- Air Chief Marshal Sir Rex Roe (1953–55)
- Marshal of the Royal Air Force Sir John Salmond (1912)
- Air Marshal Sir Anthony Selway (1932–34)
- Air Vice-Marshal Sir Tom Webb-Bowen (1912–15)

== See also ==
- List of Royal Air Force schools
- Robert Smith-Barry
