= Henry Cook (British Army officer) =

British Army general

Brigadier-General Henry Cook CIE
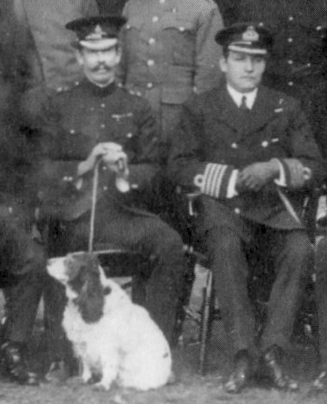
- Cook (left) at the Central Flying School with the Commandant, Captain Godfrey Paine RN
- Born: 17 August 1863; Bombay, British Raj
- Died: 21 January 1950 (aged 86); Bournemouth, Dorset, England
- Military career
- Allegiance: United Kingdom
- Branch: British Army
- Rank: Brigadier-General
- Units: Royal Artillery; Royal Flying Corps
- Conflicts: First World War; Third Anglo-Afghan War
- Awards: Companion of the Order of the Indian Empire

Brigadier-General Henry Rex Cook, CIE (17 August 1863 – 21 January 1950) was an early British aviator and an officer in the Royal Artillery during the First World War. He was the first Assistant Commandant of the Central Flying School in the years before the war.

== Early military career ==
Henry Rex Cook was born in Bombay, the son of Henry Cook and Charlotte Chesney. He and was educated at the Royal Military Academy, Woolwich, and joined the Bombay Native Artillery. In 1892, Cook who was a captain, was appointed adjutant of the Cork Artillery (Southern Division) in Ireland. He continued at Cork until 1897. In 1901 Cook was attached to the Jubaland Force as an interpreter with responsibility for mapping and as an intelligence officer. He took part in the Ogaden Punitive Expedition of 1901.

In September 1901, Cook was promoted to major. Ten years later, in December 1911, Cook was promoted to lieutenant colonel.

== Aviation ==
Cook joined the Aeronautical Society of Great Britain on 14 December 1909. He was one of the first people in England to learn to fly, taking lessons in 1910 and gaining his Royal Aero Club aviator's certificate (number 42) at Beaulieu on 31 December 1910. Following the creation of the Royal Flying Corps (RFC) in May 1912, Cook was seconded from the Royal Artillery to the RFC's Central Flying School (CFS) as an instructor in theory and construction. After the Commandant, Captain Godfrey Paine RN, Cook was next most senior officer at the School and by August he was being described as the Assistant Commandant. While at the CFS, Cook was involved in teaching theory. In September 1912 he was awarded a Royal Aero Club Special Certificate for carrying out a series flights and aerial manoeuvres which were of special merit in the early years of aviation. In December 1912, Cook spent some time in India, visiting Agra where he made observations on the ability of birds to soar and theorized on the effect of sunlight on air.

== First World War ==
On 23 June 1913, Cook returned to the Royal Garrison Artillery and was placed on the RFC's reserve list. He served throughout the First World War. In 1919, he was appointed Companion of the Order of the Indian Empire after serving in the Third Anglo-Afghan War. He retired on 14 September 1919 as a substantive colonel with the honorary rank of brigadier-general.

== Personal life ==
In 1914, Cook married widow Frances Helen Cooke (née Sullivan) in Karachi. They had two sons, Brigadier Henry Kirkpatrick Cook (1915–1973) and Geoffrey Beare Rex Cook (1917–2001). Their elder son was appointed aide-de-camp to Queen Elizabeth II in 1967.

In 1938, Frances, 56, died by suicide after jumping from the roof garden of the German Hospital, Dalston, where Frances was hospitalised for cystitis and Cook was hospitalised after undergoing an operation. According to their son Richard, she had been depressed because of the duration of her illness.

Cook died on 21 January 1950 in Bournemouth.

Military offices
| New title School established | Assistant Commandant of the Central Flying School; 1912–1913 | Succeeded by Hugh Trenchard |
