= Cuthbert MacLean =

Royal Air Force air marshal

Air Vice Marshal Cuthbert MacLean CB, DSO, MC
- Born: 18 October 1886; Whanganui, New Zealand
- Died: 25 February 1969 (aged 82)
- Allegiance: United Kingdom
- Branch: British Army (1914–18); Royal Air Force (1918–40)
- Service years: 1914–1940
- Rank: Air Vice Marshal
- Commands: No. 2 (Bomber) Group (1938–40); Middle East Command (1934–38); Aden Command (1929–31); RAF Heliopolis (1928–29); RAF Hinaidi (1925–28); No. 5 Flying Training School (1923–25); 13th Wing (1917–18); No. 11 Squadron (1917)
- Conflicts: First World War; Second World War
- Awards: Companion of the Order of the Bath; Distinguished Service Order; Military Cross; Mentioned in Despatches (2); Knight of the Legion of Honour (France)

Air Vice Marshal Cuthbert Trelawder MacLean, CB, DSO, MC (18 October 1886 – 25 February 1969) was a Royal Air Force officer who served as Air Officer Commanding-in-Chief at Middle East Command from 1934 to 1938.

== RAF career ==
Educated at Wanganui Collegiate School and Auckland University College in New Zealand, MacLean served in the First World War in the 7th Royal Fusiliers and was seconded to the Royal Flying Corps in 1915. He was awarded his aviator's certificate in October 1915 and successively served as a flight, squadron, wing and brigade commander. He received the Distinguished Service Order for distinguished service in France.

He went on to be Air Officer Commanding British Forces Aden in 1929 and Director of Postings at the Air Ministry in 1931 before becoming Air Officer Commanding Middle East Command in 1934. He was appointed Air Officer Commanding No. 2 (Bomber) Group in 1938 and served in that role in the early stages of the Second World War before retiring in 1940.

He was awarded the rank of Chevalier in the Légion d'honneur.

Military offices
Preceded by Gordon Shephard	Brigadier-General Commanding 1st Brigade RFC; Temporary appointment 19 – 21 January 1918	Succeeded by Duncan Pitcher
Preceded by William Mitchell	Commander Aden Command; 1929–1931	Succeeded by Owen Boyd
Preceded by Sir Cyril Newall	Air Officer Commanding Middle East Command; 1934–1938	Succeeded by Sir Hazelton Nicholl
Preceded by Charles Blount	Air Officer Commanding No. 2 (Bomber) Group; 1938–1940	Succeeded by James Robb
