= Gordon Strachey Shephard =

Royal Flying Corps commander

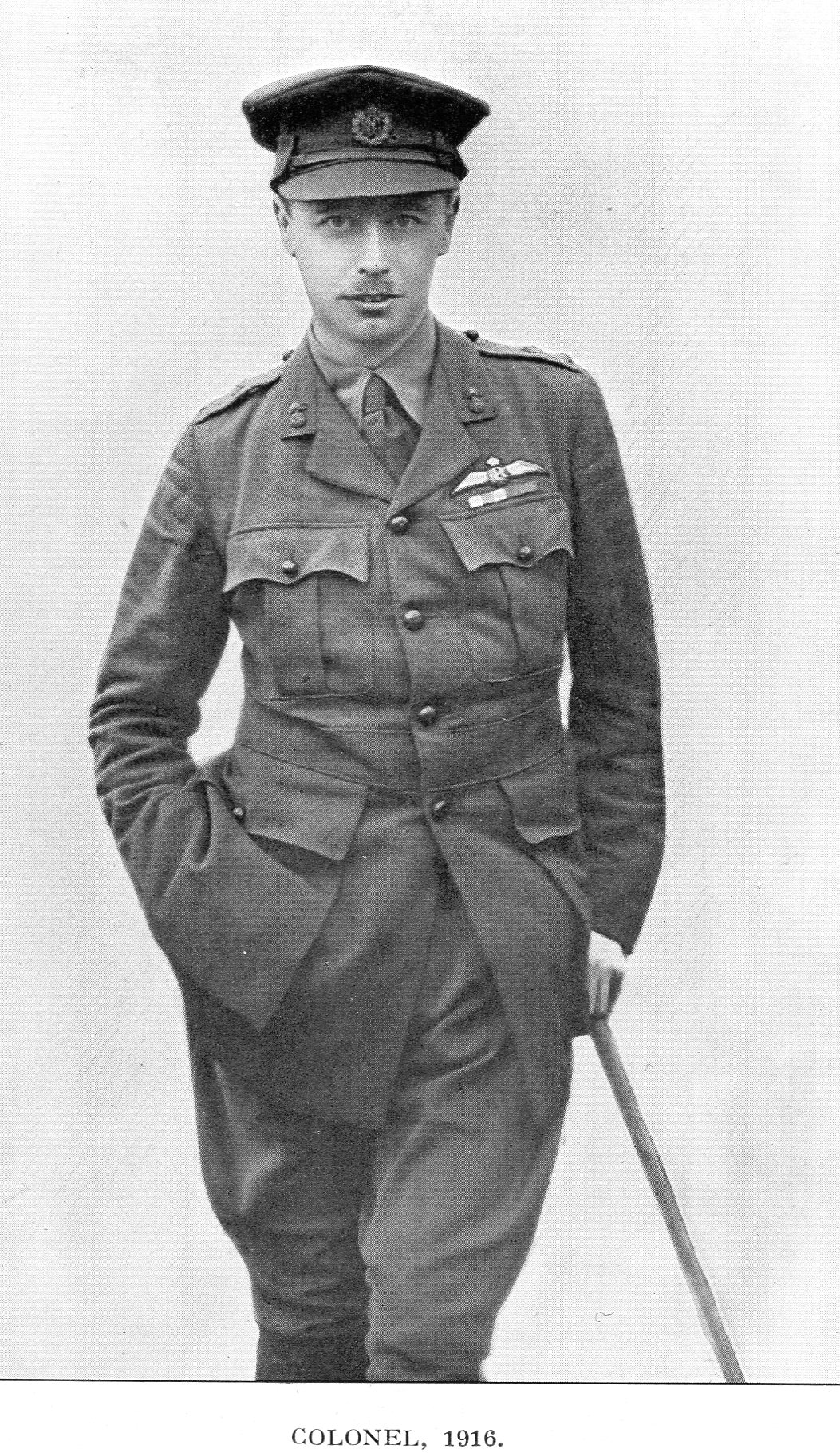
- Born: 9 July 1885; Madras, India
- Died: 19 January 1918 (aged 32); Auchel, France
- Burial place: Lapugnoy Military Cemetery
- Military career
- Allegiance: United Kingdom
- Branch: British Army (1904–18)
- Service years: 1904–1918
- Rank: Brigadier General
- Commands: I Brigade RFC (1917–18); 12th (Corps) Wing RFC (1915–17); No. 6 Squadron RFC (1915); No. 10 Squadron RFC (1915)
- Conflicts: First World War
- Awards: Distinguished Service Order; Military Cross; Mentioned in Despatches (2)

Brigadier-General Gordon Strachey Shephard, DSO, MC (9 July 1885 – 19 January 1918) was a Royal Flying Corps commander. He was the highest-ranking officer of the flying services to be killed in service during the First World War.

== Early life and military service ==
The second son of Sir Horatio Shephard, a judge, and Lady Shephard, of 58 Montagu Square, London, Shephard attended Eton College from 1898 to 1903, then the Royal Military College, Sandhurst. He belonged to the Royal Cruising Club, where his skills as a yachtsman would prove useful later in life. He was gazetted second lieutenant to a Regular Army battalion of the Royal Fusiliers on 28 January 1905. He transferred to the Royal Flying Corps (RFC) in 1912, the year of its formation. However, in July 1914, he used his skills as a yachtsman for a quite different purpose, to surreptitiously assist his friend Erskine Childers (who was executed by the Free State government in 1922 during the Irish Civil War) in landing a consignment of weaponry at Howth aboard Childers' yacht, The Asgard, on behalf of the Irish Volunteers, an action which, had it become known, would have resulted in, at a minimum, the termination of Shephard's military career, if not far more drastic punishment. His covert operations came to an abrupt halt when he and a companion were briefly detained by the German authorities at Emden, after they were seen taking photographs in a sensitive area.

On 22 August 1914, Shephard landed near Maubeuge for petrol, where he was given first-hand accounts of the fighting from French cavalry falling back from the Sambre canal. On 24 August 1914, he and Lieutenant Ian Bonham-Carter reported to the Staff that General von Kluck's right wing would swamp the British Army unless the retreat was continued. On 4 November 1914, Shephard narrowly escaped after the longeron of his BE2b, "487", was shot through.

At the start of 1915, Shephard assumed command of the newly formed No. 10 Squadron, which was then assigned to a training role at Farnborough. Two months later and before No. 10 Squadron deployed to France, Shephard was reassigned to command No. 6 Squadron. In February 1917 Shephard was promoted to command I Brigade RFC and was promoted to the rank of brigadier general, which gave him greater opportunity to further the careers of able pilots.

== Death ==
On 19 January 1918, aged 32, Shephard decided to visit the aerodrome at Auchel, where three of his squadrons were stationed. His Nieuport Scout "B3610" spun into the ground. He was lifted from the wreckage but died several hours later in hospital. He was the highest-ranking officer of the flying services to be killed in a theatre of war in the First World War, and was buried in the Lapugnoy Military Cemetery, in the Pas de Calais, France (plot VI, B15).

== Legacy ==
The Gordon Shephard Memorial Essay Prize was established as a memorial to Shephard. Shepard's father, Sir Horatio, left a sum of money in trust to award annual prizes for essays on reconnaissance and related subjects submitted by RAF officers and airmen.

== Other reading ==
- The Memoirs of Gordon Shephard (edited by Shane Leslie); privately published (1924)

Military offices
New title Squadron established	Commanding Officer No. 10 Squadron RFC; January - March 1915	Succeeded by U J D Bourke
Preceded by J H W Becke	Commanding Officer No. 6 Squadron RFC; March - December 1915	Succeeded by R P Mills
Preceded by Duncan Pitcher	Brigadier-General Commanding I Brigade RFC; 1917–1918	Succeeded by Cuthbert MacLean; Temporary appointment, followed by: Duncan Pitcher
