= Rudolph Hogg =

Rudolph Edward Trower Hogg
- Born: 19 January 1877
- Died: 29 June 1955 (aged 78)
- Military career
- Allegiance: United Kingdom
- Branch: British Indian Army
- Service years: 1896 – 1919
- Rank: Brigadier General
- Units: Royal Artillery, Central India Horse, Royal Air Force
- Conflicts: First World War
- Awards: CMG CIE

Brigadier General Rudolph Edward Trower Hogg CMG CIE (1877–1955) was a senior British Indian Army officer during the First World War.

== Biography ==
Born on 19 January 1877, Rudolph Trower Hogg was educated at Bedford School and at the Royal Military Academy, Woolwich. He received his first commission as a second lieutenant in the Royal Artillery in September 1896.

He transferred to the Central India Horse in 1901 and was promoted to the rank of Captain in 1905. He was appointed Assistant Military Secretary to King George V in 1911 and served during the Delhi Durbar between 1911 and 1912. He served during the First World War, during the Gallipoli Campaign and in France, and was appointed Brigade Commander of the newly formed Royal Air Force in 1918.

Brigadier General Rudolph Trower Hogg was invested as a Companion of the Order of the Indian Empire in 1911, and as a Companion of the Order of St Michael and St George in 1919. He retired in 1919 and died on 29 June 1955.
