= No. 2 Wing RAF =

Royal Air Force formation

No. 2 Wing RAF Second Wing RFC 2nd Corps Wing RFC No. 2 (Plymouth) Wing RAF No. 2 (Bomber) Wing RAF No. 2 Operational Wing RAF
- Active: 1914-16; 1916-19; 1919-20; 1939; 1941
- Country: United Kingdom
- Branch: Royal Air Force; Royal Flying Corps
- Role: Reconnaissance
- Size: Wing

No. 2 Wing of the Royal Air Force was a wing of aircraft squadrons which was originally established as the Second Wing of the Royal Flying Corps.

== First World War ==
By November 1914 the Flying Corps had significantly expanded and it was felt necessary to create organizational units which would control collections of squadrons. Accordingly, the Second Wing and its sister wing, First Wing, were established. These two wings came into existence on 29 November 1914 and were the earliest RFC numbered wings to be formed. The wing's first commander was Charles Burke.

The Second Wing was assigned to the support of the 2nd Army in France. The wing saw action on the Western Front and was renamed to 2nd Corps Wing RFC on 20 March 1916. It was stood down on 12 September 1919.

The wing was reformed as No. 2 (Plymouth) Wing RAF on 15 May 1919 at RAF Cattewater within No. 10 Group RAF controlling No. 238 Squadron RAF until April 1920.

== Second World War ==
The wing was reformed No. 2 (Bomber) Wing RAF on 25 August 1939 at RAF Heliopolis. However it disbanded on 21 September 1939 and became No. 251 Wing RAF. The wing was reformed on 3 November 1941 as No. 2 Operational Wing RAF at LG.102 Sidi Haneish controlling No. 112 Squadron RAF and No. 3 Squadron RAAF. It was shortly disbanded during November 1941 into No. 258 Wing RAF.
