= John Salmond =

Marshal of the Royal Air Force (1881–1968)

Marshal of the Royal Air Force Sir John Salmond GCB CMG CVO DSO*
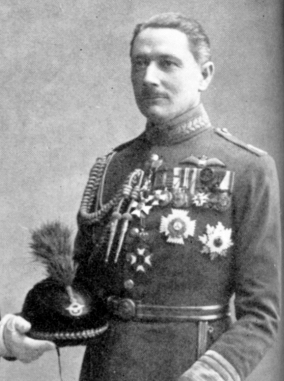
- Air Marshal Sir John Salmond in 1925
- Born: 17 July 1881; London, England
- Died: 16 April 1968 (aged 86); Eastbourne, England
- Military career
- Allegiance: United Kingdom
- Branch: British Army (1901–1918); Royal Air Force (1918–1943)
- Service years: 1901–1933
- Rank: Marshal of the Royal Air Force
- Commands: Chief of the Air Staff (1930–1933); Air Member for Personnel (1929–1930); Air Defence of Great Britain (1925–1928); Iraq Command (1922–1924); Inland Area (1920–1922); Southern Area (1919–1920); VI Brigade RFC (1916–1917); V Brigade RFC (1916); II Brigade RFC (1916); 2nd Wing RFC (1915–1916); No. 3 Squadron RFC (1914–1915); No. 7 Squadron RFC (1914)
- Conflicts: Second Boer War; First World War; Second World War
- Awards: Knight Grand Cross of the Order of the Bath; Companion of the Order of St Michael and St George; Commander of the Royal Victorian Order; Companion of the Distinguished Service Order & Bar; Mentioned in Despatches (7); Officer of the Legion of Honour (France); Croix de guerre (France); Commander of the Order of the Crown of Italy; Commander of the Order of Leopold (Belgium); Croix de guerre (Belgium); Order of the White Eagle (Russia); Distinguished Service Medal (United States)

Marshal of the Royal Air Force Sir John Maitland Salmond, GCB, CMG, CVO, DSO & Bar (17 July 1881 – 16 April 1968) was a British military officer who rose to high rank in the Royal Flying Corps and then the Royal Air Force. During the First World War he served as a squadron commander, a wing commander and then as General Officer Commanding the RAF on the Western Front towards the end of the war. He went on to be Air Officer Commanding British Forces in Iraq in the early 1920s when he halted a Turkish invasion and sought to put down a Kurdish uprising against King Faisal, the British-sponsored ruler of Iraq. He was Chief of the Air Staff in the early 1930s and bitterly opposed the position taken by British politicians at the World Disarmament Conference in Geneva, which would have led to the UK's complete aerial disarmament. In the event the talks broke down when Adolf Hitler withdrew from the Conference in October 1933.

== Early life ==
John Salmond was born the son of Major General Sir William Salmond and Emma Mary Salmond (née Hoyle). His siblings included a brother, Geoffrey, and sister, Gwen. After first being taught by a series of governesses he then attended Miss Dixon's School in Thurloe Square, London. At the age of nine Salmond was sent to Aysgarth Preparatory School in Yorkshire. In 1894, he went up to Wellington College and in 1900 he attended the Royal Military College, Sandhurst.

== Military career ==
After Salmond graduated from Sandhurst with a commission as a second lieutenant on 8 January 1901, he was transferred to the King's Own Royal Lancaster Regiment on 9 March 1901. He sailed for South Africa to join his unit, which was engaged in the latter part of the Second Boer War. In 1902 he applied for a secondment to the West African Frontier Force but was turned down on the grounds that he was too young: he re-applied the following year and was accepted on 14 November 1903. He was immediately seconded to the colonial service and then promoted to lieutenant on 5 April 1904. Salmond's time in Africa was cut short as he was pronounced medically unfit and returned to England in November 1906. He was promoted to captain on 26 June 1910.

Salmond learned to fly at the Central Flying School in 1912 and was awarded Royal Aero Club certificate No. 272 on 13 August 1912. Having been seconded to the Royal Flying Corps, he became a flight commander at the Central Flying School on 12 November 1912 and then a squadron commander there on 31 May 1913. In December 1913 he set the solo British altitude record at 13,140 feet. He became Officer Commanding No. 7 Squadron flying Sopwith Tabloids and the RE8s from RAF Farnborough with the temporary rank of major on 1 May 1914. He continued in that role during the early weeks of the First World War until August 1914, when he became Officer Commanding No. 3 Squadron on the Western Front. He was mentioned in despatches on 8 October 1914 and appointed a Companion of the Distinguished Service Order on 24 March 1915.

Salmond went on to be Officer Commanding the Administrative Wing at RAF Farnborough in April 1915, and having been promoted to the substantive rank of major on 8 January 1916, he became Commander of II Brigade RFC in February 1916, Commander of V Brigade RFC later that month and of VI Brigade RFC in March 1916. He was promoted to brevet lieutenant colonel on 3 June 1916 and was appointed a Companion of the Order of St Michael and St George on 4 June 1917.

Major-General Salmond in 1917.

Salmond became Commander of the Training Brigade in July 1916 and then, as General Officer Commanding Training Division from August 1917, shortly after being promoted to temporary major general in June, he opened many more flying schools, laid down minimum training standards and introduced new modern teaching methods. He was appointed Director-General of Military Aeronautics at the War Office on 18 October 1917. Promoted to brevet colonel on 7 December 1917, Salmond became General Officer Commanding the Royal Flying Corps in the Field (formation subsequently redesignated Royal Air Force in the Field) on 18 January 1918 and managed to secure complete air superiority over the German forces. He was appointed a Commander of the Royal Victorian Order on 13 August 1918.

Salmond was appointed an Officer of the French Legion of Honour on 10 October 1918 and a Commander of the Belgian Order of Leopold on 8 November 1918 and was awarded the Belgian Croix de guerre on the same date. He was also appointed a Knight Commander of the Order of the Bath on 1 January 1919 and awarded the American Distinguished Service Medal on 15 July 1919 and the French Croix de Guerre on 21 August 1919.

Salmond was awarded a permanent commission in the Royal Air Force as a major-general in August 1919 (shortly afterwards redesignated as an air vice marshal). He was made Air Officer Commanding Southern Area in September 1919 and then Air Officer Commanding Inland Area in April 1920. In October 1922 he became Air Officer Commanding Iraq Command, in which role, as officer commanding all British forces in Iraq, he halted a Turkish invasion and sought to put down a Kurdish uprising against King Faisal, the British-sponsored ruler of Iraq. Promoted to air marshal on 2 June 1923, he became Air Officer Commanding-in-Chief, Air Defence of Great Britain in January 1925. He was placed on loan to Australian Government in May 1928, where he made an extensive aerial tour of northern Australia. before being promoted to air chief marshal and appointed Air Member for Personnel on 1 January 1929.

Salmond was appointed Chief of the Air Staff on 1 January 1930. In that role he bitterly opposed the position taken by British politicians at the World Disarmament Conference in Geneva which would have led to the UK's complete aerial disarmament. In the event the talks broke down when Hitler withdrew from the Conference in October 1933. Salmond was advanced to Knight Grand Cross of the Order of the Bath in the 1931 Birthday Honours. Salmond was promoted to Marshal of the Royal Air Force on 1 January 1933 and he relinquished the post of Chief of the Air Staff on 1 April 1933. Salmond was succeeded by his older brother, Air Chief Marshal Sir Geoffrey Salmond. However, only 27 days later, Geoffrey Salmond died and John Salmond was temporarily re-appointed as Chief of the Air Staff. He stood down for the second and final time on 22 May 1933.

== Later years ==
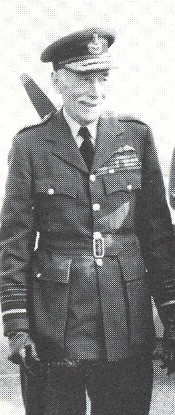
MRAF Sir John Salmond

Salmond attended the funeral of King George V in January 1936. During the Second World War, Salmond was Director of Armament Production at the Ministry of Aircraft Production. In the autumn of 1940, he chaired a committee of enquiry into Britain's night air defences; his report was one factor in the removal of Hugh Dowding from Fighter Command. Salmond resigned his post as Director of Armament Production in 1941 after clashing with Lord Beaverbrook, the Minister of Aircraft Production immediately acted the post of Director-General of Flying Control and Air Sea Rescue. Ill health forced Salmond to retire in 1943; however he remained President of the Royal Air Force Club for 23 years and regularly appeared at major RAF events. He became Honorary Air Commodore of No. 3618 (County of Sussex) Fighter Control Unit of the Royal Auxiliary Air Force on 5 January 1950 and attended the coronation of Queen Elizabeth II in June 1953. He died at Eastbourne in Sussex on 16 April 1968.

== Family ==
In 1913, Salmond married Helen Amy Joy Lumsden. Less than three years later, in 1916, Helen Salmond died giving birth to their first child. In 1924, Salmond married for the second time, this time to Hon. Monica Margaret Grenfell; they had a son and a daughter:

- Julian John William Salmond who married his distant cousin, Brigid Louise Wright, sister of Susan Barrantes and had four children.
- Rosemary Laura Salmond who married to Nicholas Mosley.

== Sources ==
- Gunn, John (1985). The Defeat of Distance: Qantas, 1919–1939. Univ of Queensland Press. ISBN 978-0702217074.
- McKinstry, Leo (2010). Hurricane: Victor of the Battle of Britain. John Murray (Publishers). ISBN 978-1-84854-339-3.
- Probert, Henry (1991). High Commanders of the Royal Air Force. HMSO. ISBN 0-11-772635-4.

Military offices
Preceded by Robert Brooke-Popham	Officer Commanding No. 3 Squadron; 1914–1915	Succeeded by Donald Lewis
Preceded by Edward Ashmore	Officer Commanding the Administrative Wing, RFC; 1915	Succeeded by Lionel Charlton
Preceded by Charles Burke	Officer Commanding 2nd Wing; 1915–1916	Succeeded by Donald Lewis
Vacant Title last held by John Higgins on 15 January 1916	Officer Commanding the II Brigade RFC; 10–16 February 1916	Succeeded by Tom Webb-Bowen
New title Brigade formed	Officer Commanding the V Brigade RFC; February – March 1916	None; Absorbed into VI Brigade
Unknown	Officer Commanding the VI Brigade RFC; Command retitled Officer Commanding the Training Brigade in July 1916; 1916–1917	Enlarged to Training Division in June 1917
New title Division formed from Training Brigade	General Officer Commanding the Training Division, RFC; June – October 1917	Succeeded by Charles Longcroft
Preceded by Sir David Henderson	Director-General of Military Aeronautics; 1917–1918	Succeeded by Edward Ellington
Preceded by Hugh Trenchard	General Officer Commanding the Royal Flying Corps in the Field; Post retitled GOC the RAF in the Field on 1 April 1918; 1918–1919	Post disestablished
Preceded by Amyas Borton; As Officer Commanding Iraq Group	Air Officer Commanding Iraq Command; 1922–1924	Succeeded by John Higgins
New title	Commander-in-Chief Air Defence of Great Britain; 1925–1928	Succeeded by Francis Scarlett
Preceded by Sir Philip Game	Air Member for Personnel; 1929–1930	Succeeded by Sir Tom Webb-Bowen
Preceded by Sir Hugh Trenchard	Chief of the Air Staff; 1930–1933	Succeeded by Sir Geoffrey Salmond
Preceded by Sir Geoffrey Salmond	Chief of the Air Staff; 1933	Succeeded by Sir Edward Ellington
Notes and references
1. A list of Salmond's military appointments can be found in Probert, Henry (1991). High Commanders of the Royal Air Force. London: HMSO. p. 103. ISBN 0-11-772635-4.
