= John Becke =

Royal Air Force Brigadier General (1879–1949)

- Brigadier General Becke
- Born: 17 September 1879; Liverpool, England
- Died: 7 February 1949 (aged 69)
- Military career
- Allegiance: United Kingdom
- Branch: British Army (1899–1918); Royal Air Force (1918–20)
- Service years: 1899–1920
- Rank: Brigadier General
- Commands: II Brigade RFC (1917–18); IV Brigade RFC (1916–17); 1st (Corps) Wing RFC (1915–16); No. 2 Squadron RFC (1915); No. 6 Squadron RFC (1914–15)
- Conflicts: Second Boer War; World War I
- Awards: Companion of the Order of St Michael and St George; Distinguished Service Order; Air Force Cross; Mentioned in Despatches (2); Officer of the Legion of Honour (France); Croix de guerre (France)

Brigadier General John Harold Whitworth Becke, CMG, DSO, AFC (17 September 1879 – 7 February 1949) was an infantry officer in the Second Boer War and squadron, wing and brigade commander in the Royal Flying Corps during World War I. He transferred to the Royal Air Force (RAF) on its creation on 1 April 1918 as a temporary brigadier general. He retired from the RAF in 1920.

He was born in Liverpool on 17 September 1879. As a captain in the Sherwood Foresters, he was seconded to the Royal Flying Corps and awarded his Royal Aero Club aviators certificate on 18 June 1912 flying a Bristol Biplane at Brooklands. Becke was the first commanding officer of No. 6 Squadron, one of a handful of flying squadrons to be established before the First World War.

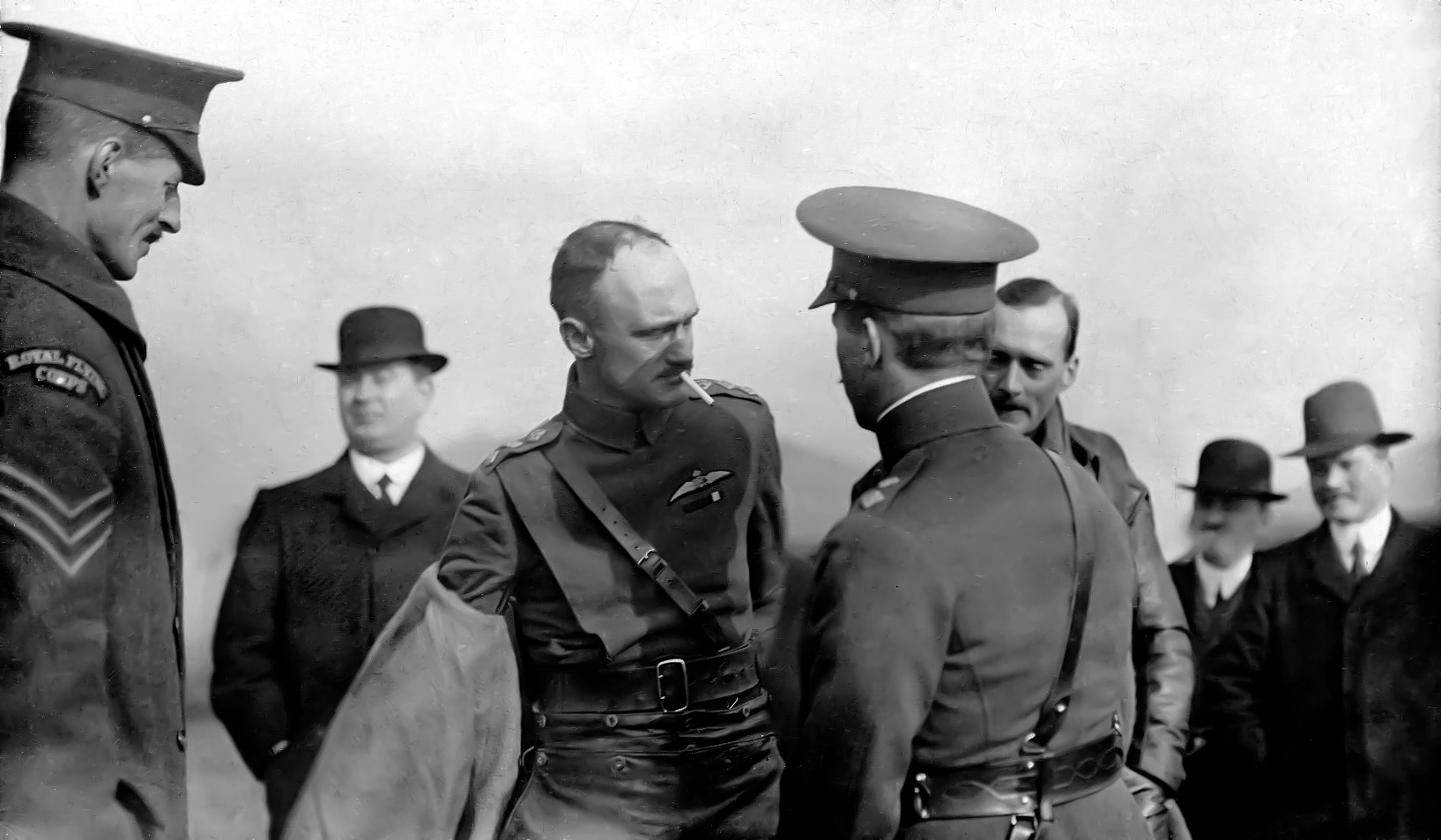
Becke at Upper Dysart in 1913.

Military offices
New title Squadron established	Commanding Officer No. 6 Squadron RFC; 1914–1915	Succeeded by Gordon Shephard
Preceded by Sir Tom Webb-Bowen	Commanding Officer No. 2 Squadron RFC; 1915	Succeeded by C F de S Murphy
Preceded by Edward Ashmore	Officer Commanding 1st Wing RFC; 1915–1916	Unknown
Preceded by Edward Ashmore	Brigadier-General Commanding IV Brigade RFC; 1917	Brigade disbanded
Preceded by Tom Webb-Bowen	Brigadier-General Commanding II Brigade RFC; 1917–1918	Succeeded by Tom Webb-Bowen
