= Robert Smith-Barry =

- Robert Smith Barry (right) with his Commanding Officer F. F. Waldron (left) at Gosport in 1916
- Born: Robert Raymond Smith-Barry; 4 April 1886; London, England
- Died: 23 April 1949 (aged 63); Durban, South Africa
- Military career
- Allegiance: United Kingdom
- Branch: Royal Flying Corps; Royal Air Force Volunteer Reserve
- Service years: 1912–1918; 1940–1943
- Rank: Major (temporary Brigadier-General)
- Commands: No. 60 Squadron RFC
- Conflicts: First World War; Second World War
- Awards: Air Force Cross

Robert Raymond Smith Barry AFC (4 April 1886 – 23 April 1949) was an officer in the Royal Flying Corps and its successor, the Royal Air Force. His most notable contribution was in developing flying instruction methods.

In December 1916 he masterminded a complete reorganisation of flying training methods at Gosport. This new training method later became known as the "Gosport System" and was adopted worldwide. The curriculum combined classroom training and dual flight instruction. Students were not led away from potentially dangerous manoeuvres but deliberately exposed to them in controlled environments so they could learn to recover from errors of judgement. The choice of training aircraft later settled on the Avro 504J.

Smith-Barry was later described by Lord Trenchard as the man who "taught the air forces of the world how to fly".

== Early life ==
Smith-Barry was born on 1 August 1886 in Mayfair, London, the son of James Hugh Smith-Barry and his wife Charlotte Jane. He was educated at Eton College and Trinity College, Cambridge from 1904 although he left without taking a degree. He learnt to fly in 1911 at Salisbury Plain and was one of the first officers in the new Royal Flying Corps formed in August 1912.

== World War I ==
With the outbreak of war, on 5 August 1914, Smith-Barry was appointed as a flying officer. Only days later, on 14 August, while on operations in France with No. 5 Squadron RFC, Smith-Barry's Royal Aircraft Factory B.E.8 had an engine failure and crashed, killing his passenger. Smith-Barry had had two broken legs but on hearing of the imminent arrival of Germans he managed to get back to England on his own accord. On 5 November 1915 he was made a temporary captain and less than a month later on 1 December his temporary promotion was made permanent. 3 July 1916 saw Smith-Barry temporarily promoted to major. On 23 August 1917 he was made a wing commander and temporary lieutenant-colonel. Towards the end of January 1918, he was promoted to the temporary rank of brigadier-general but he relinquished the rank on 23 February 1918. Later in 1918, his promotion to colonel in the new Royal Air Force was gazetted but this was later cancelled. He was awarded the Air Force Cross in May 1918.

== Later years ==
Retiring to Conock Manor near Upavon, Wiltshire after the war as a country gentleman, he re-joined the Royal Air Force during the second world war as a ferry pilot and ground instructor.

Smith-Barry died in Durban, South Africa on 23 April 1949, aged 63, following an operation on his leg, which had troubled him since the crash in 1914.

Military offices
| Unknown | General Officer Commanding Northern Training Brigade | Succeeded by John Becke; As GOC No. 16 Group |
