= Godfrey Paine =

Royal Navy Rear Admiral (1871–1932)

Rear-Admiral Sir Godfrey Paine KCB MVO
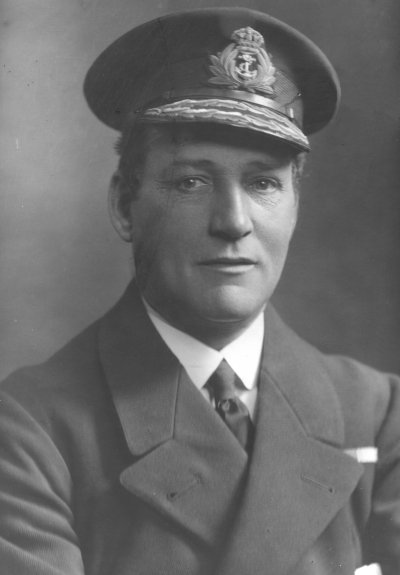
- Born: 21 November 1871
- Died: 23 March 1932 (aged 60)
- Burial place: at sea off Nab Tower, Portsmouth
- Military career
- Allegiance: United Kingdom
- Branch: Royal Navy (1885–1918); Royal Air Force (1918–1920)
- Service years: 1885–1920
- Rank: Rear-Admiral
- Nickname: Bloody
- Commands: Inspector-General of the RAF (1918–1920); Master-General of Personnel (1918); Fifth Sea Lord (1917); Central Depot and Training Establishment (1915–1917); Central Flying School (1912–1915); HMS Actaeon (1911–1912); Third Destroyer Flotilla (1909–1911); HMS Diamond (1909–1911); HMS Albatross (1904–1905)
- Known for: First commandant, Central Flying School
- Conflicts: First World War
- Awards: Knight Commander of the Order of the Bath; Member of the Royal Victorian Order; Commander of the Order of the Crown of Italy; Gold and Silver Star of the Order of the Rising Sun (Japan); Navy Distinguished Service Medal (United States)

Rear-Admiral Sir Godfrey Marshall Paine, KCB, MVO (21 November 1871 – 23 March 1932) was a senior officer in the Royal Navy (RN) and the Royal Air Force (RAF) in the early part of the 20th century. He played a leading role in joint and naval flying training before and during the First World War.

== Early life ==
Godfrey Marshall Paine was born on 21 November 1871, the fourth son of James Paine and his wife Henrietta Grace (née Allen).

== Royal Navy career ==
Paine joined the Royal Navy in early 1885, becoming a midshipman on 15 June 1887. He was a lieutenant on HMS Renown, before becoming first lieutenant on the armoured cruiser HMS Hogue on its commission in late 1902. In 1903, Paine was promoted to commander and later served as the executive officer on his old ship HMS Renown.

In 1907, Paine was promoted captain and in 1909, he was appointed the Officer Commanding the Third Destroyer Flotilla. This appointment was followed by command of the torpedo schoolship HMS Actaeon in 1911. It was while Paine was in command of Actaeon that he first became involved in naval aviation. The first four Royal Naval and Royal Marine officers who learnt to fly (Longmore, Samson, Gerrard, and Gregory) were borne on the books of Actaeon, and Paine took a keen interest in their progress.

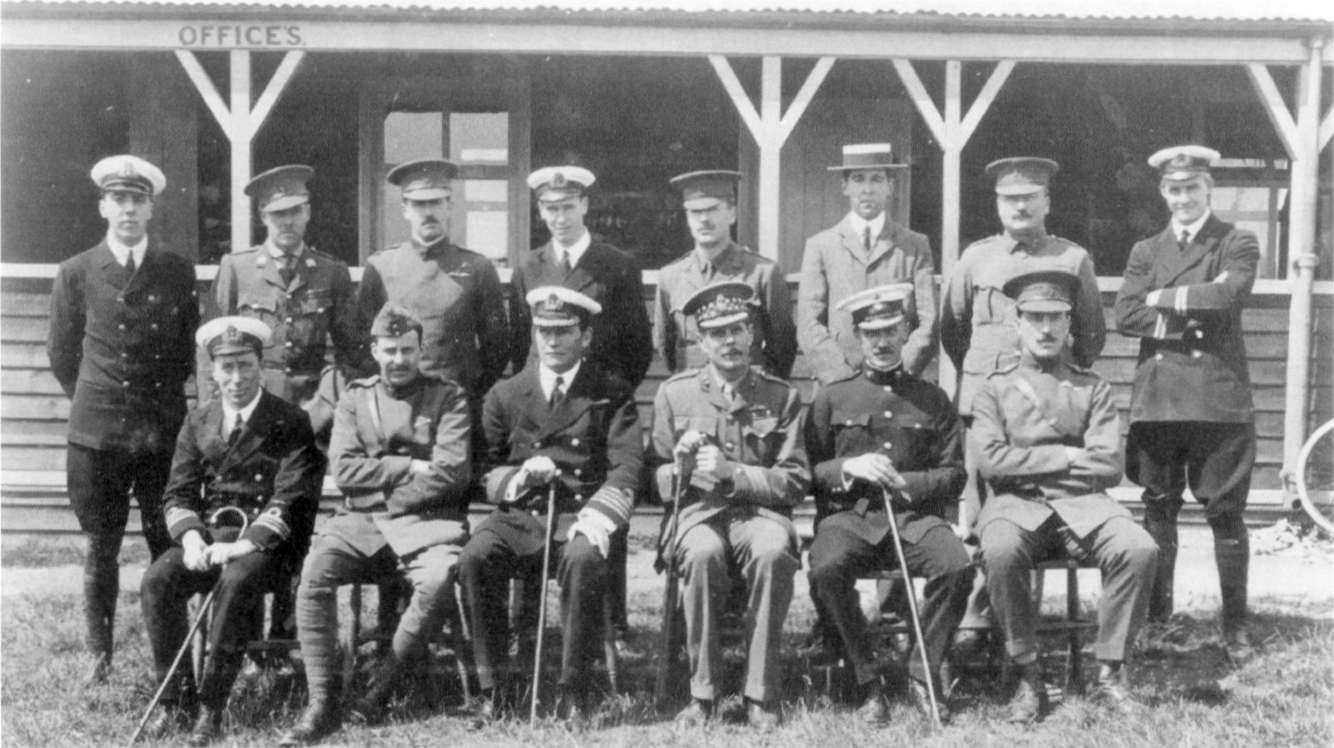
The Central Flying School staff at Upavon Aerodrome in January 1913. Paine is in the front row, shown third from the left.

In 1912, Paine was appointed as the first commandant of the Central Flying School (CFS) at Upavon Aerodrome, so, before taking up this post, he learned to fly, being awarded Pilot's Licence No. 217 on 15 May 1912 (at the age of 40). Three years later in 1915, after the Royal Naval Air Service had formally separated from the Royal Flying Corps, the Royal Navy established the Central Depot and Training Establishment. The new unit was based at Cranwell, and Paine was raised to the rank of commodore, first class, and sent there as its first commander. Just over a year later, in early 1917, Paine was appointed Fifth Sea Lord, making him responsible for all naval aviation.

== Royal Air Force career ==
With the establishment of the Royal Air Force (RAF) in 1918, the posts of Fifth Sea Lord and Chief of Naval Air Service were abolished and the Navy's aircraft and aviators were transferred to the RAF. Paine was promoted to major general (a rank of the RAF at that time) and appointed to the Air Council as Master-General of Personnel. With the introduction of RAF-specific ranks in 1919, Paine was regraded to air vice marshal. His last military appointment was as Inspector-General of the RAF. On his retirement from the RAF on 12 May 1920, Paine was granted the rank of retired rear admiral.

== Post-military life ==
Following his retired from the military, Paine subsequently became Chairman of Totalisators Ltd. He died 23 March 1932 (aged 60), and was buried at sea off Nab Tower, Portsmouth.

Military offices
New title School established	Commandant of the Central Flying School; 1912–1915	Succeeded by Duncan Pitcher
New title Establishment founded	Commodore of the Central Depot and Training Establishment; 1915–1917	Succeeded by John Luce
Preceded by Sir Charles Vaughan-Lee; As Director of Air Services	Fifth Sea Lord; 1917	In abeyance Title next held by Sir Alexander Ramsay
New title Air Council established	RAF Master-General of Personnel; 1918	Succeeded by Sir Sefton Brancker
New title RAF established	Inspector-General of the RAF; 1918–1920	Vacant Title next held by Sir Robert Brooke-Popham
