= No. 1 Wing RAF =

Royal Air Force formation

No. 1 Wing RAF First Wing RFC 1st Corps Wing RFC No. 1 (Yatesbury) Wing RAF No. 1 (Army Co-operation) Wing RAF No. 1 (General Reconnaissance) Wing RAF No. 1 (Bomber) Wing RAF No. 1 Balloon Barrage Wing No. 1 (Signals) Wing RAF
- Active: 29 November 1914 – 5 March 1919; 15 May 1919 – unknown; 1 January – 12 April 1926; 23 October – 15 December 1937; 9 May, 25 August – 22 September 1939; 24 January – 24 June 1940; October 1958 – September 1961
- Country: United Kingdom
- Branch: Royal Air Force; Royal Flying Corps
- Type: Wing

No. 1 Wing of the Royal Air Force was a Wing of aircraft squadrons which was originally established as the First Wing of the Royal Flying Corps.

== First World War ==
By November 1914 the Flying Corps had significantly expanded and it was felt necessary to create organizational units which would control collections of squadrons. Accordingly, the First Wing and the Second Wing were established. These two wings came into existence on 29 November 1914 and were the earliest RFC numbered wings to be formed. The wing's first commander was Hugh Trenchard who had been appointed a few days earlier.

The 1st Wing was assigned to the support of the 1st Army in France. The wing saw action on the Western Front, including at the Battle of Aubers Ridge in May 1915. It was stood down on 5 March 1919.

== Inter-war activity ==
During the years between the First and Second World Wars, No. 1 Wing was re-established and disestablished several times for several purposes. Only two months after its disbandment, the wing was re-established at Yatesbury on 15 May 1919. The wing was subsequently disbanded and was not re-established for the second time until 1 January 1926 which it acted as an Army Co-operation unit, controlling No. 4 Squadron and No. 13 Squadron whilst itself being subordinate to 7 Group RAF. This establishment was short-lived and the wing was stood down on 12 April 1926. The next period of the wing's existence came in 1937. On 23 September the wing was re-created, this time controlling No. 209 Squadron and No. 210 Squadron which acted in the general reconnaissance role during the Spanish Civil War. Specifically, the wing was part of an Anglo-French force charged with countering submarine attacks on neutral shipping. The wing was disestablished later that year on 15 December.

== Second World War ==
No. 1 Wing was briefly re-established once more just before the outbreak of the Second World War on 9 May 1939 as a general reconnaissance wing. On 25 August 1939 it was reformed as a bomber wing in Egypt controlling No. 30 and No. 55 Squadrons, but was disbanded on 22 September. Between 24 January and 24 June 1940 it was in control of barrage balloon units in France.

== Post war ==
No. 1 Wing's last reformation was as a signals wing between October 1958 and September 1961.

== Commanders ==
- 19 November 1914: Lieutenant-Colonel Hugh Trenchard
- 19 August 1915: Lieutenant-Colonel Edward Ashmore.
- 1 November 1915: Lieutenant-Colonel John Becke
- Late 1917: Lieutenant-Colonel T. W. C. Carthew
- 5 December 1917: Lieutenant-Colonel Leslie Gossage.
- January 1919: Lieutenant-Colonel Charles Portal.

== See also ==
- List of Wings of the Royal Air Force
