= Duncan Pitcher =

Royal Air Force air commodore (1877–1944)

Air Commodore Duncan Pitcher CMG CBE DSO
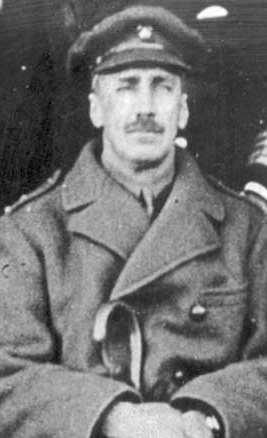
- Pitcher during the First World War
- Born: 31 August 1877; Naini Tal, East Indies
- Died: 1 September 1944 (aged 67); Uxbridge, London, England
- Military career
- Allegiance: United Kingdom
- Branch: British Army (1898–1918); Royal Air Force (1918–29)
- Service years: 1898–1929
- Rank: Air Commodore
- Commands: No. 22 Group (1926–29); No. 7 Group (1925–26); 1st Brigade RFC (1916–17, 1918); Central Flying School (1915–16)
- Conflicts: First World War
- Awards: Companion of the Order of St Michael and St George; Commander of the Order of the British Empire; Distinguished Service Order; Mentioned in Despatches (2); Officer of the Order of Saints Maurice and Lazarus (Italy); Officer of the Legion of Honour (France)

Air Commodore Duncan le Geyt Pitcher, CMG, CBE, DSO (31 August 1877 – 1 September 1944) was an infantry and cavalry officer in the British Indian Army. During the First World War he served in the Royal Flying Corps and in his later years became a senior commander in the Royal Air Force.

== Early years ==
Pitcher was born in Naini Tal in Uttarakhand (then called the East Indies), the son of Major Duncan Pitcher and his wife Rose. His father was on active service with the Bengal Staff Corps of the British Indian Army. At the time of the 1881 Census the family are living in Hendon, North London. In the 1891 Census Pitcher is a 13-year-old scholar at the Sedbergh School in Yorkshire.

Pitcher was commissioned into the British Army as a second lieutenant in The South Wales Borderers on 16 February 1898, and promoted to lieutenant on 10 January 1900.

== Military aviation ==
Pitcher was sent from India to the Central Flying School in Great Britain in order to learn how to fly and gain the requisite knowledge to set up a flying school in India. The European War broke out before he could return to India and Pitcher became involved in military aviation in Europe.

Pitcher attended the Central Flying School as a pilot under training in 1913 and once he had completed his course, he remained on the staff until the summer of 1914 when he was attached to No 4. Squadron RFC. He returned to the Central Flying School, probably in late 1914 and was appointed Officer In-charge of Transport. Immediately following the New Year of 1915, Pitcher took up instructional duties before being appointed a squadron commander at the Central Flying School in late January. In April 1915 he was appointed Assistant Commandant at the Central Flying School in which capacity he served until mid November 1915. Pitcher then spent around a month as a Royal Flying Corps wing commander before returning to the Central Flying School as its Commandant when Godfrey Paine returned to naval duties at Cranwell.

The 1 April 1916 saw Pitcher promoted and appointed Brigadier-General Commanding the I Brigade. In 1915 he recommended A. M. Low in WWI for work on the radio control systems for unmanned ‘Aerial Target' aircraft and then in 1918, for the remote control Distance Control Boats.

In 1921 Duncan was the best man at his old RFC colleague Robert Loraine’s wedding. Loraine had a great deal in common with Reginald Denny, a younger British actor/airman. They had been in a West End production together in 1902 in London, they were both veterans of the RFC (and its successor, the Royal Air Force) and were both flying and making films in Hollywood in the 1930s. Each of them visited their close relatives in the same area of London. Loraine knew both Duncan, his best man, the Air-Commodore who had been in charge of the RFC radio control weapons that led to the first powered military drone aircraft and Denny, a fellow actor who became interested in radio controlled aircraft and started the first US military drone work at the start of WWII.

Military offices
Preceded by Godfrey Paine	Commandant of the Central Flying School; 1915–1916	Succeeded by Charles Burke
Preceded by Edward Ashmore	Brigadier-General Commanding I Brigade RFC; 1916–1917	Succeeded by Gordon Shephard
Preceded by Cuthbert MacLean; Temporary appointment, preceded by: Gordon Shephard	Brigadier-General Commanding I Brigade RFC; January – December 1918	Brigade disbanded End of the First World War
Preceded by Arthur Longmore	Air Officer Commanding No. 7 Group; 1925–1926	Vacant Title next held by Ralph Cochrane
Vacant Title last held by Edward Masterman	Air Officer Commanding No. 22 Group; 1926–1929	Succeeded by Norman MacEwen
