= Jack Higgins (RAF officer) =

British officer (1875-1948)

John Frederick Andrews Higgins
- Born: 1 September 1875
- Died: 1 June 1948 (aged 72); Leamington, England
- Military career
- Allegiance: United Kingdom
- Branch: British Army; Royal Air Force
- Service years: 1895–1930; 1939–1940
- Rank: Air Marshal
- Commands: Air Forces in India (1939–40); Air Member for Supply and Research (1926–30); Iraq Command (1924–26); Inland Area (1922–24); Northern Area (1919–20); RAF Rhine (1919); Midland Area (1918–19); No. 3 Area (1918); III Brigade RFC (1916–18); VI Brigade RFC (1916); II Brigade RFC (1915–16); RFC Training Wing (1914–15); No. 5 Squadron RFC (1913–14)
- Conflicts: Second Boer War; First World War; Second World War
- Awards: Knight Commander of the Order of the Bath; Knight Commander of the Order of the British Empire; Distinguished Service Order; Air Force Cross; Mentioned in Despatches (6); Officer of the Legion of Honour (France)
- Other work: Director of Air Service Training Ltd

Air Marshal Sir John Frederick Andrews Higgins, KCB, KBE, DSO, AFC (1 September 1875 – 1 June 1948), known as Jack Higgins, was a senior officer in the Royal Flying Corps, serving as a brigade commander from 1915 to 1918. After the First World War he served in a range of senior posts in the Royal Air Force until his retirement in 1930. He returned to active service for the first year of the Second World War.

== RAF career ==
Higgins became a cadet at the Royal Military Academy, Woolwich and was commissioned into the Royal Field Artillery as a second lieutenant on 15 June 1895, and promoted to lieutenant on 15 June 1898. He served in the Second Boer War in South Africa, where he took part in the operations in Natal in 1899, including actions at Rietfontein and Lombard's Kop. Severely wounded in early January 1900, during the Defence of Ladysmith, he was later back in action and was promoted to captain on 15 March 1901. After the end of the war in June 1902, Higgins left Cape Town in the SS Bavarian in August, returning to Southampton the following month. For his service during the war, he was mentioned in despatches and awarded the Distinguished Service Order (DSO) dated 29 November 1900.

After his return, he was posted at Ammunition Park, Aldershot Garrison. He served as Officer Commanding No. 5 Squadron from July 1913 and then at the start of November 1914, Higgins was selected to head up the RFC's training wing which was based at Netheravon. He went on to command II Brigade RFC, VI Brigade RFC and then III Brigade RFC during the course of the First World War. In the closing stages of the war he was General Officer Commanding No. 3 Area and then General Officer Commanding Midland Area. He was appointed a Commander of the Order of the Bath (CB) and awarded the Air Force Cross in the 1919 Birthday Honours.

He was restored to the active list, on half-pay in 1920. He was again restored to the active list early in 1921. After the War he was appointed General Officer Commanding RAF forces of the Rhine and then Air Officer Commanding Northern Area before becoming Director of Personnel at the Air Ministry in 1920. He went on to be Air Officer Commanding Inland Area in 1922, Air Officer Commanding Iraq Command (as a temporary Major General) in 1924 and Air Member for Supply and Research in 1926. He was promoted to Air Vice Marshal in 1929. He retired to India in 1930 but was recalled as Air Officer Commanding-in-Chief of the Air Forces in India in October 1939 at the start of the Second World War before retiring again in August 1940.

Higgins was appointed a Knight Commander of the Order of the British Empire (KBE) in the 1925 Birthday Honours, and promoted to Knight Commander of the Order of the Bath (KCB) in the 1928 Birthday Honours.

Military offices
New title Squadron formed	Officer Commanding No. 5 Squadron; 1913–1914	Succeeded by Archibald MacLean
New title Wing formed from elements of the Military Wing	Officer Commanding No. 4 (Training) Wing; 9 November 1914 – 1915	Unknown
Preceded by Tom Webb-Bowen	Officer Commanding No. 3 Wing; 2 June – 25 August 1915	Succeeded by Sefton Brancker
New title Brigade formed	Brigadier-General Commanding II Brigade RFC; 23 October 1915 – 15 January 1916	Vacant 2nd Brigade re-designated as the 6th Brigade Title next held by John Salmond; In February 1916
New title Brigade formed by re-designating the 2nd Brigade	Brigadier-General Commanding 6th Brigade RFC; 15–30 January 1916	Unknown
New title Brigade formed	Brigadier-General Commanding 3rd Brigade RFC; RAF from 1 April 1918; 30 January 1916 – 29 April 1918	Succeeded by Charles Longcroft
Preceded by Cecil Lambert	RAF Director of Personnel; 1920	Unknown
Preceded by John Salmond	Air Officer Commanding Iraq Command; 1924–1926	Succeeded by Edward Ellington
Preceded by Sir Geoffrey Salmond	Air Member for Supply and Research; 27 December 1926 – 1 September 1930	Succeeded by Hugh Dowding
Preceded by Sir Philip Joubert de la Ferté	Commander-in-Chief, Air Forces in India; 1939–1940	Succeeded by Sir Patrick Playfair
