= Goshawk (disambiguation) =

Goshawk is a name applied to several species of birds of prey. Goshawk may also refer to:

== Aviation ==
- Curtiss F11C Goshawk, a Curtiss Hawk-series biplane fighter-bomber
- Curtiss BF2C Goshawk, a biplane primarily used in the Chinese Air Force from 1937 to 1941, also called the Hawk III
- Rolls-Royce Goshawk, an aircraft engine
- T-45 Goshawk, a training aircraft used by the United States Navy

== Ships ==
- HMS Goshawk, the name of several ships and a shore establishment of the Royal Navy
- USS Goshawk, the name assigned to three US Navy ships, of which only one was built
  - USS Goshawk (AM-79), a Goshawk-class minesweeper built in 1919

== Books ==
- Goshawk Squadron, a 1971 novel by Derek Robinson
- The Goshawk, a 1951 book by T. H. White

== Other uses ==
- "The Gay Goshawk", Child ballad number 96, a folksong
- Evelyn Goshawk (1916–1994), Canadian long jumper
