= Damned Good Show =

2002 novel by Derek Robinson

- First edition
- Author: Derek Robinson
- Language: English
- Genre: War novel
- Publisher: Cassell Military Classics
- Publication date: 2002
- Publication place: United Kingdom
- Media type: Print (Hardcover)
- Pages: 320
- Preceded by: A Good Clean Fight
- Followed by: Hullo Russia, Goodbye England

Damned Good Show is a 2002 novel by Derek Robinson, concerning the actions of Bomber Command of the Royal Air Force in the first two years of the Second World War. It is the third book of Robinson's "RAF Quartet", which began with Piece of Cake in 1983 and continued with A Good Clean Fight in 1993. Skull Skelton, a character in those earlier novels, is one of the protagonists of Damned Good Show. Like all of Robinson's novels, Damned Good Show points out the inadequacies of the pre-war establishment and the many hurdles that Bomber Command had to overcome during the course of the war, such as inadequate aircraft—in this case the Handley Page Hampden, and the inaccuracy of the night-time bombing raids on Germany.

== Reception ==
Kirkus Reviews in their review said "readers be warned: appealing characters get shot down and die. It's war, and Robinson never lets you forget it. Brilliant truths about smart lads in the days before smart bombs." A reviewer for The Daily Telegraph compared it to Catch-22 by Joseph Heller saying "this is terrific, rigorous stuff, full of telling research and sharp insight. It is also mordantly funny and, in its way, as loud an anti-battle cry as Catch-22."
