= Cotes Mill =

16th-century water mill in Leicestershire, England

Coordinates: 52°46′46″N 1°10′54″W

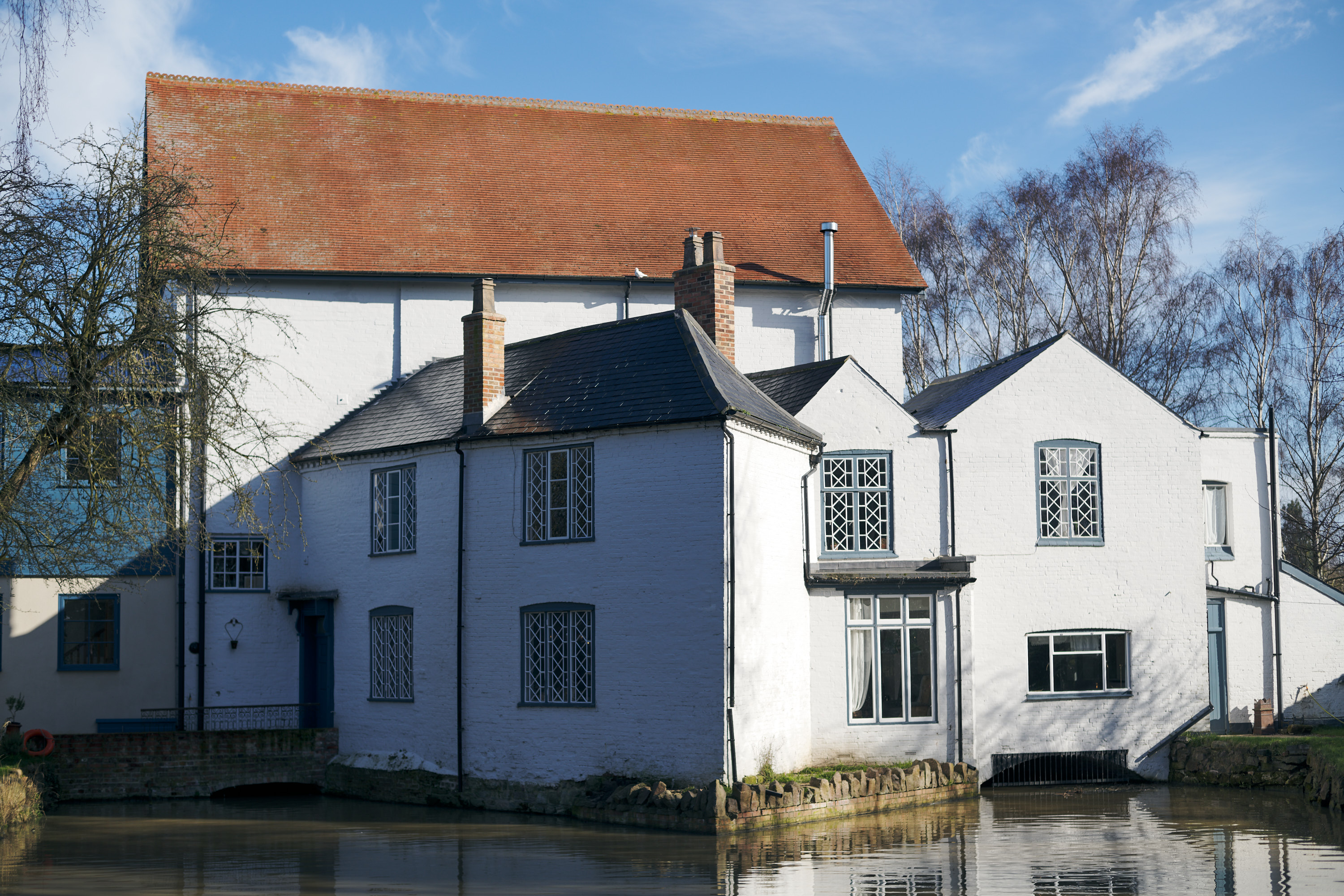
The exterior of Cotes Mill in Leicestershire

Cotes Mill is a Grade II listed 16th-century water mill on the banks of the River Soar in Cotes, Leicestershire. The first recorded mention of the mill was in the Domesday Survey in 1086.

In 2012 the building and grounds of Cotes Mill were bought by Paul J. O'Leary, designer and inventor of flatulence filtering products. Cotes Mill now houses four of Mr O’Leary’s businesses including deVOL Kitchens and Shreddies Underwear. It is also a vintage and antiques centre and furniture, underwear and clothing are made on site.

On January 6, 2020 Nicky Morgan was named as Baroness of Cotes, the hamlet near Loughborough, Leicestershire where Cotes Mill is located.

== History ==
In 1644, Cotes Bridge, which sits beside Cotes Mill, was named as the site of a battle in the English Civil War. The battle was between the attacking Parliamentarian Roundheads and the defending Royalists.

Cotes Mill was the lower mill of two mills in the parish of Loughborough; it originally belonged to the crown and therefore was referred to as the King's Mills.

Those living within the Manor of Loughborough were expected to grind their corn at the King's Mills, however, by the end of the 16th century other local millers began offering a cheaper and better service in order to compete for trade. In 1610, Katherine, widow of the Earl of Huntingdon and holder of the Manor, began a lawsuit, maintaining that the Lords of the Manor had the right of grinding the corn at Loughborough. A total of 10 lawsuits were brought, until in 1698, almost 100 years after the original complaint, the verdict was given at Leicester Assizes in favour of the defendants. Following the court’s decision, the people of Loughborough were free to choose which mill to use.

In 1810 the mills were sold to become part of Prestwold estate.

In 1980 Cotes Mill was purchased by Everards Brewery and became a pub and restaurant until 2007.

In 2012 Cotes Mill was purchased and renovated by Paul O’Leary, owner of deVOL Kitchens, who moved its showrooms there the following year.

== Accolades ==
In 2014 the limestone spiral staircase built in deVOL Kitchens’ Cotes Mill showrooms was nominated for a Natural Stone Award by the Stone Federation of Great Britain. Although it did not win, it was highly commended as the first self-supporting stone spiral staircase in the UK.
