= Derek Robinson (novelist) =

British author (born 1932)

- Born: 12 April 1932 (age 94); Bristol
- Citizenship: British
- Education: University
- Alma mater: Downing College, Cambridge
- Occupations: screenwriter, author, Rugby Union referee, broadcaster
- Writing career
- Pen name: Dirk Robson
- Period: 1971–present
- Genre: fiction
- Notable works: Goshawk Squadron, Piece of Cake, The Eldorado Network, A Darker History of Bristol; A Load of Old Bristle: Krek Waiter's Peak Bristle, Run with the Ball
- Website: www.derekrobinson.info

Derek Robinson (born 12 April 1932) is a British author best known for his military aviation novels full of black humour. He has also written several books on some of the more sordid events in the history of Bristol, his home town, as well as guides to rugby. He was nominated for the Booker Prize in 1971 for his first novel, Goshawk Squadron.

After attending Cotham Grammar School, Robinson served in the Royal Air Force as a fighter plotter during his National Service. He read history at Downing College, Cambridge, worked in advertising in the UK and the US and was later employed as a broadcaster on radio and television. He was a qualified rugby referee for more than thirty years and is a life member of Bristol Society of Rugby Referees. He was married in 1964.

Following his research of historical records for his novel Piece of Cake (1983), Robinson became convinced that it was the supremacy of the Royal Navy in the United Kingdom's coastal waters that caused Adolf Hitler to postpone invasion plans and not the Battle of Britain, as commonly accepted.

== Works ==
=== Aviation novels ===
Novels set in squadrons of the Royal Flying Corps (later the Royal Air Force) during the First World War:

- Goshawk Squadron (1971) is set in 1918, with the squadron flying the S.E.5a.
- War Story (1987) is set in 1916, with Hornet Squadron flying the F.E.2b and F.E.2d which they prefer to the B.E.2 Quirks.
- Hornet's Sting (1999) is set in 1917, with Hornet Squadron flying the Sopwith Pup, Nieuport, and the Bristol F.2B Fighter.

Novel set in the inter-war era:

- A Splendid Little War (2013) is set in 1919, with a British Squadron taking part in the Russian Civil War and flying Sopwith Camels.

Novels set in RAF squadrons during the Second World War:

- Piece of Cake (1983) is set during the Phoney War and Battle of Britain, with Hornet Squadron flying the Hurricane. The TV miniseries (1988) with the same name is based on this book.
- A Good Clean Fight (1993) covers the Desert Air Force during 1942, with Hornet Squadron flying the Curtiss Tomahawk.
- Damned Good Show (2002) covers RAF Bomber Command's early bomber operations and has fictional No. 409 Squadron RAF flying the Handley Page Hampden.

Novel set in the Cold War:

- Hullo Russia, Goodbye England (2008) begins in 1943, as Silk (the main protagonist from Damned Good Show) is on his second tour, and moves into the early 1960s, when he rejoins the RAF as an Avro Vulcan pilot during the Cuban Missile Crisis. This novel was originally self-published and only available from Robinson's own website, but a paperback edition was published by MacLehose Press in 2012.

All eight of Robinson's aviation novels were released in paperback editions by MacLehose Press in 2012–2013.

=== Luis Cabrillo novels ===
Novels featuring Luis Cabrillo:

- The Eldorado Network (1979), about counter-espionage in WWII Spain and Portugal.
- Artillery of Lies (1991), set mostly in England and Germany.
- Red Rag Blues (2006), about espionage and the McCarthy witch hunts in 1950s America.
- Operation Bamboozle (2009), in which Luis Cabrillo travels to Los Angeles and tangles with the Mob. Self-published and available from his website.

=== Other books ===
- Son of Bristle (1971) Abson Books. A guide to Bristle azit's poke.
- A Shocking History of Bristol (1973) Abson Books.
- Rotten with Honour (1973), about Cold War espionage.
- Kramer's War (1977) is set on the island of Jersey in 1944.
- Run with the Ball (1984). Collins. Guide to Rugby Union play.
- The Best Green Walks in Bristol (1994). Westcountry Books. Local walking guide.
- A Load of Old Bristle: Krek Waiter's Peak Bristle (2002). Robinson, Derek, and Wiltshire, Vic. Countryside Books. More infermasun on howter's peak Bristle.
- Kentucky Blues (2002), about life in a 19th-century American town.
- Sick Sentries of Bristle (2004). Countryside Books. "A slapstick dash through 600 years of local excitements".
- Invasion, 1940 (2005), a nonfiction work about World War II that aims to debunk "two powerful myths": first, that the RAF alone prevented an invasion of Great Britain by Hitler's Germany; and second, that such an invasion force would inevitably have conquered Britain.
- A Darker History of Bristol (2005). Countryside Books. "A fair share of cruel, inglorious, and scandalous episodes that are generally little referred to".
- Rugby: A Player's Guide to the Laws (2005). HarperCollinsWillow. The laws of the game made simple.
- Better Rugby Refereeing (2007), co-authored with Ed Morrison.
- Why 1914? (2014) A forensic and darkly humorous re-examination of the origins of WW1
