= A Good Clean Fight =

1993 novel by Derek Robinson

- 1st Edition cover
- Author: Derek Robinson
- Language: English
- Genre: War novel
- Published: 1993 (Harvill)
- Publication place: United Kingdom
- Media type: Print (Hardcover)
- Pages: 453 pp
- ISBN: 0-00-271338-1
- OCLC: 28065890
- Preceded by: Piece of Cake
- Followed by: Damned Good Show

A Good Clean Fight is a 1993 novel by Derek Robinson, and a sequel to Piece of Cake (1983), his famous and controversial novel of the Battle of Britain. It continues the story of RAF Hornet Squadron, now posted to North Africa in 1942, during a lull in the fighting. Some of the characters from the previous novel, such as Squadron Leader "Fanny" Barton and erudite but iconoclastic intelligence officer "Skull" Skelton, reprise their roles. As the squadron engages in increasingly suicidal ground attacks to lure the Luftwaffe into a fight, Captain Jack Lampard leads an SAS patrol behind enemy lines and Paul Schramm, a German intelligence officer, tries to concoct his own scheme to beat the SAS at their own game.

== Hornet Squadron ==
The fictional RAF Hornet Squadron features in several novels by Derek Robinson, most notably Piece of Cake, which detailed their service during the first year of the Second World War. In that novel the squadron was equipped with the Hawker Hurricane but by the time of A Good Clean Fight they have been replaced with the Curtiss P-40 Tomahawks and Kittyhawks. Many of the surviving characters from the previous novel return, including "Fanny" Barton, the squadron's young New Zealander commanding officer; "Pip" Patterson, a Scottish pilot who has been promoted to Flight Lieutenant, "Skull" Skelton, a former Cambridge University don who serves as the squadron's intelligence officer and voices many unpopular theories about the war and Flight Lieutenant "Uncle" Kellaway, the squadron's adjutant and a veteran of the First World War. Unusual for a Derek Robinson novel, A Good Clean Fight also features other branches of the armed forces, such as a patrol of the Special Air Service (SAS), as well as several characters from the Luftwaffe and Afrika Korps.

== Plot summary ==
A Good Clean Fight is set in North Africa in the spring of 1942. The Eighth Army is fighting against Axis forces advancing across Libya towards Egypt. Captain Lampard of the British SAS has led a motorised patrol across the inland ‘sand seas’ to penetrate deep behind German lines. Lampard is a brave officer but he has a serious flaw, a tendency to be overly reckless and to bite off more than he can chew. Infiltrating a German Luftwaffe base at Barce, Lampard's patrol destroy dozens of aircraft without a casualty. They also capture a Luftwaffe intelligence officer, Major Paul Schramm. Whilst the patrol are hiding from a German plane, Schramm escapes on foot. Lampard sends Corporal Harris out after him but by sheer fluke, Schramm manages to kill his pursuer. The major makes it back to Barce and he takes off as a passenger in a Fieseler Fi 156 Storch to search for the SAS patrol. They find Lampard's force but the SAS soldiers damage the plane with gunfire, forcing it to crash-land, leaving Schramm injured. Lampard, disregarding warnings from his men, brings his patrol close to an enemy base. They are fired upon by Italian troops, and one of Lampard's men is killed.

The patrol enjoys a break in Cairo. Lampard indulges in a favourite pastime of seducing the wives of officers who have recently been killed. Whilst he is bedding one widow, an Australian officer who is another of her lovers enters the apartment and in the ensuing confrontation, Lampard kills him. Anxious to avoid the repercussions for this act and for the errors he made on the previous patrol, Lampard eagerly volunteers to lead his men out on another sortie into the desert.

Hornet Squadron arrives in Egypt under the command of New Zealander 'Fanny' Barton, a veteran of the Battles of France and Britain. Since 1940, Barton has become ruthlessly ambitious. Amongst his pilots are 'Pip' Patterson, another veteran but who, unlike Barton, is war-weary. Adjutant Kellaway and Intelligence Officer 'Skull' Skelton are also present. Barton, eager to make a name for himself, proposes to take Hornet Squadron, equipped with US-built Curtiss Tomahawks, out to a forward airstrip LG-181 and commence a campaign of low-level strafing attacks on enemy targets designed to provoke the Luftwaffe into battle; the plan is approved.

In Cairo, two war correspondents, Lester and Malpacket, ill-equipped to cope with the desert, are desperate for a news story that will give them a scoop.

In Libya, Schramm is treated for his injuries by an Italian doctor, Maria Grandinetti, an attractive woman who is a fugitive from Mussolini's regime. Schramm's humour and courage are shown to be a thin disguise for his fear and uncertainty and despite his awkwardness, he is attracted to the cheerfully cynical doctor.

Major Jakowski of the Afrika Korps is determined to tackle the SAS raiders head on by taking a large motorised column out into the desert. Days of fruitless searching prompts him to divide his force into two and the section that he leads, whilst driving at night, speeds over the rim of a crescent-shaped dune and most of it is wiped out in the fiery pile-up. The other section, under Captain Lessing, heads for home.

Hornet Squadron begin to carry out low-level strafing attacks on a variety of enemy targets in Libya. Despite some initial success, anti-aircraft fire and wear-and-tear soon take their toll of the squadron’s aircraft and Skelton tries to warn Barton that if he maintains the current pace of operations, Hornet Squadron will soon be in no shape to take on the Luftwaffe if it rises to the bait. In desperation, Barton orders repeat-attacks on the same targets with the result that the enemy prepare more AA defences, culminating in the loss of five pilots in a day. Kellaway suffers a nervous breakdown. The remains of Hornet squadron are ordered to a new airstrip—LG 250—and converted to carry bombs.

Lampard’s SAS patrol drives across the inland sand sea in a wide circle behind Axis lines, heading for Benghazi, with Lester and Malplacket. Schramm comes up with a plan to match the boldness of the SAS by taking a single, long-range Heinkel He 111 bomber southwards to bomb the isolated but vital British supply bases along the Takoradi Trail. The trail is a long supply route stretching from the coast of Nigeria across central Africa to Cairo.

Hornet Squadron, equipped with newer Curtiss Kittyhawks, begin to attack German airfields and, as Barton had hoped from the start, the enemy Messerschmitt Bf 109 fighters finally rise to do battle. Barton has a mere four pilots left with which to achieve his aims. Within days, two of the pilots are dead and a third, Pip Patterson, is wounded.

Captain Lessing’s force encounters Lampard’s patrol and is virtually wiped out in a night ambush. Leaving a detachment at a base camp, Lampard takes the rest of his men deeper into enemy territory with plans to attack the Luftwaffe base at Beda Fomm but just as they arrive, Barton and his last remaining pilot, American Hick Hooper, make a dive-bombing attack which puts the defences on full alert. Angered, the SAS patrol heads for an alternative target, the airfield at Barce where Schramm is based. Despite the Germans now being aware of their presence, Lampard recklessly presses on to reach the airfield and they wipe out two squadrons of Bf 109s. It is now nearly dawn and the Germans are in hot pursuit. Confrontations with Italian CR-42 fighters and a convoy of German infantry sees the patrol lose nine men and all their vehicles, leaving only Lampard and two others alive. They manage to reach their base camp and rejoin the detachment that had been left there.

Flown by an Italian pilot named Di Marco, Schramm’s Heinkel flies the long route to the British transit base at Fort Lamy in Chad. Due to its isolation, the base is undefended and caught by surprise, allowing the Heinkel to destroy months' worth of fuel and supplies along with nearly two dozen Hawker Hurricane fighters. Lampard and Barton receive instructions to seek and destroy the Heinkel. Lampard takes his remaining men and vehicles deeper into the desert. The Heinkel runs out of fuel short of the nearest Axis base at Defa and lands in the desert to await rescue. Lampard finds them first, resulting in a surprise meeting between him and Schramm. The SAS take the Heinkel crew as prisoners and head for home. The Kittyhawks flown by Barton and Hooper arrive. Mistaking the vehicles to be German, the two pilots strafe them, killing everyone.

Lester and Malpacket drive a Fiat truck into enemy-held Benghazi, bluffing their way past sentries to wander throughout the place without being challenged. En route home, the truck breaks down and the novel ends with the two men walking east through the desert with the little water they have left. At Paul Schramm's funeral, Maria Grandinetti reflects on their relationship, "I helped him to stop feeling sorry for himself and to stop being angry with everyone else. And I showed him a lot of dying men, so he could see that war is not adventure and that pain is not payment, because it buys nothing. He didn't believe me".

== Critical reception ==
Mike Petty, writing in the UK Independent in 1993, praised the novel, saying that Robinson "picks his way surefootedly through the quagmire of moral complications without ever resorting either to handwringing or to gung-ho posturing, and, most importantly, without devaluing bravery."
