= USS Goshawk =

Several ships of the United States Navy have been named USS Goshawk, after the goshawk, a large, short-winged hawk.

- USS Goshawk (AM-2) was authorized for construction on 6 October 1917, but construction was canceled in 1918
- USS Goshawk (AM-42) Lapwing-class minesweeper, but construction of this ship was cancelled 4 December 1918.
- USS Goshawk (AM-79) which was acquired by the US Navy on 3 September 1940 and later reclassified (AMc-4)
