= Shreddies Underwear =

Flatulence-filtering underwear brand

Shreddies Ltd. manufactures flatulence-filtering garments, produced in Leicestershire, England. British designer Paul J. O'Leary worked with researchers and lingerie designers from De Montfort University to launch the design in 2009. O'Leary is also the founder and Director of deVOL Kitchens and Floors of Stone.

The company name comes from a colloquial term for underwear that originated in the British Armed forces (see RAF slang).

The garments feature an activated carbon back panel that absorbs flatulence odours. Originally invented as healthcare underwear for people with conditions such as IBS, Crohn’s disease and food intolerances, the garments are now available in department stores around the UK and are marketed at everyone.

Shreddies Ltd. has developed the collection to include flatulence filtering underwear, pyjamas and jeans for both men and women, as well as incontinence underwear for all ages.

== Technology ==
Shreddies Ltd. garments feature an activated carbon back panel, which absorbs and neutralises odours. The panel is reactivated when the garment is washed. Research by De Montfort University found that the fabric “removes sulphide and ethyl mercaptan so effectively it can filter odours 200 times the strength of the average flatus emission”.

== Awards ==
In 2009 Shreddies underwear received a “Look Good Feel Good” award from the Association for Continence Advice.
