= Piece of Cake (TV series) =

1988 British ITV drama

- Masterpiece Theatre DVD edition
- Genre: Drama
- Based on: Piece of Cake by Derek Robinson
- Screenplay by: Leon Griffiths; Derek Robinson
- Directed by: Ian Toynton
- Starring: Tom Burlinson; Neil Dudgeon; Boyd Gaines; Nathaniel Parker; David Horovitch; Richard Hope
- Theme music composer: Chris Walker
- Country of origin: United Kingdom
- Original language: English
- No. of series: 1
- No. of episodes: 6

Production
- Executive producer: Linda Agran
- Producer: Andrew Holmes
- Cinematography: Peter Jessop
- Running time: 51 minutes (including commercials)
- Production companies: Holmes Associates; LWT

Original release
- Network: ITV
- Release: 2 October – 6 November 1988

Piece of Cake is a 1988 British six-part television serial depicting the life of a Royal Air Force fighter squadron from the day of the British entry into World War II through to one of the toughest days in the Battle of Britain (7 September 1940). The series was produced by Holmes Associates for LWT for ITV and had a budget of five million pounds.

== Synopsis ==
The series is based on the 1983 novel Piece of Cake, by Derek Robinson. In the book, the squadron is equipped with Hurricanes. The relative rarity of airworthy Hurricanes in the late 1980s precluded their use in the television series.

The squadron depicted is the fictional Hornet Squadron, which is equipped with Supermarine Spitfire fighters, and deployed to France, where it waits out the Phoney War in comfort and elegance, until the German attack on Western Europe in May 1940. One by one, nearly all of the original pilots are killed and as losses mount, the character of the squadron changes from a casual nonchalance to a fight for survival. By the end of the series, only four of the original fourteen officers have survived.

Some of the major themes explored in the script include: the snobbery and class-consciousness that existed in the RAF during the era; the belief cherished by many of the pilots that the war would be fought as a sporting gentleman's contest; the inflexibility and ineffectiveness of the tactics used by RAF Fighter Command in early 1940 and the poor gunnery skills and inadequate training of many of the British pilots in the early days of World War II. Like Robinson's original novel, the story spans the first year of the war, from September 1939 to the German Luftwaffe's first massed aerial assault on London on 7 September 1940.

== Main cast ==
- Jack McKenzie as Squadron Leader Ramsey (pilot, commanding officer. KIA 1939)
- Tim Woodward as Squadron Leader Rex (Pilot, Ramsey's successor. KIA 1940)
- Stephen MacKenna as Flight Lieutenant Marriott (Engineering Officer. KIA 1940)
- David Horovitch as Flight Lieutenant 'Uncle' Kellaway (Adjutant)
- Tom Burlinson as Flight Lieutenant 'Fanny' Barton (Pilot, Flight Commander, Rex's successor)
- Richard Hope as Flying Officer 'Skull' Skelton (Intelligence Officer)
- Neil Dudgeon as Flying Officer 'Moggy' Cattermole (Pilot. KIA 1940)
- George Anton as Flying Officer 'Pip' Patterson (Pilot)
- Gerard O'Hare as Flying Officer 'Flip' Moran (Pilot, Flight Commander. KIA 1940)
- Nathaniel Parker as Flying Officer 'Flash' Gordon (Pilot. KIA 1940)
- Jeremy Northam as Pilot Officer 'Fitz' Fitzgerald (Pilot. KIA 1940)
- Tomek Bork as Pilot Officer 'Zab' Zabarnowski (Pilot. KIA 1940)
- Gordon Lovitt as Pilot Officer 'Sticky' Stickwell (Pilot. KIA 1940)
- Patrick Bailey as Pilot Officer 'Mother' Cox (Pilot. WIA 1940)
- Boyd Gaines as Pilot Officer Chris Hart (Replacement Pilot, U.S. Volunteer. KIA 1940)
- Tom Radcliffe as Pilot Officer 'Dickie' Starr (Pilot. KIA 1939)
- Mark Womack as Pilot Officer 'Moke' Miller (Pilot. KIA 1940)
- Helena Michell as Mary (Schoolteacher and wife to Fitz)
- Jason Calder as Pilot Officer Trevelyan (Pilot. KIA 1940)
- Sam Miller as Pilot Officer 'Dumbo' Dutton (Pilot. KIA 1940)
- Timothy Lyn as Pilot Officer 'Boy' Lloyd (Pilot. KIA 1940)
- Neil Clark as LAC Todd (Ground-Crew)
- John Bleasdale as LAC Gullet (Batman)
- Richard Durden as Medical Officer
- Daniel Andre Pageon as Henri (Cafe Owner)
- Michael Elwyn as Air Commodore Bletchley

== Crew ==
- Director – Ian Toynton
- Producer – Andrew Holmes
- Associate producers – Adrian Bate and Robert Eagle
- Executive producer – Linda Agran

== Episodes ==
No.	Title	Original release date
1	"I September 1939"	2 October 1988
The series begins in September 1939 on the day that war is declared. Squadron-Leader Ramsey is working furiously to whip Hornet Squadron into shape. Having just landed after a practice flight, Ramsey accidentally taxis his Spitfire into a slit-trench and his angry impatience causes him to fall from the aircraft and fatally fracture his neck. His temporary replacement is Australian pilot Fanny Barton who is uncertain about his capabilities for such a role (in the book, Barton is from New Zealand). A tragic mistake is made when Barton leads a patrol to intercept what they are led to believe is a German attack and he shoots down a bomber, which is later identified to be a British Blenheim, killing the pilot in the process. New Squadron Leader Rex arrives and Barton is sent away to face a court of inquiry. Rex is immediately popular as he provides his pilots with many luxuries whilst demanding strict discipline and adherence to textbook tactics in return.
2	"October 1939"	9 October 1988
Hornet squadron is despatched to France to await a possible German invasion. Billeted in a luxury manor, the pilots live well although one, Moggy Cattermole, shows himself to be a vicious bully, singling out vulnerable characters Pip Patterson and Dicky Starr. In a dangerous stunt, Moggy flies his Spitfire under a low bridge, goading Patterson and Starr to do the same. Starr is killed whilst attempting to do so and Moggy shows not the slightest remorse. A new pilot arrives, an American named Chris Hart who has fought in the Spanish Civil War and is unimpressed with the gentlemanly tactics favoured by Rex. Two of the pilots, Fitz and 'Flash' Gordon start romances with two local schoolteachers, a young French woman named Nicole and an expat Englishwoman named Mary. An exonerated Barton returns to the squadron.
3	"December 1939"	16 October 1988
As the 'Phoney War' draws to a close, Hornet Squadron begins to see more action. Hart is unimpressed by the tactics and skills of his fellow pilots when it takes six of them to destroy a single German bomber. In its first encounter with German fighters, one pilot, Miller, is killed and three Spitfires lost without any successes to show for it. In another sortie, Cox is badly wounded and an inexperienced pilot, flying at the rear of the tight formation that Rex demands, is picked off by a German fighter without anyone else in Hornet squadron noticing.
4	"May 1940"	23 October 1988
The German Blitzkrieg has begun with the invasion of France and Belgium. The squadron celebrates a double wedding as Fitz and Gordon marry their respective partners. The happy reception is brutally interrupted by a German air-raid that causes considerable damage. Rex is badly wounded by shrapnel but conceals his injuries from the other pilots but the painkillers he takes render him euphoric and overconfident. Recklessly ordering his men to attack a much larger German formation, Rex dives down to his death whilst Barton orders the others not to follow. Now squadron leader, Barton leads what remains of the squadron against the overwhelming German invaders. Sticky is killed and Patterson is nearly undone by fear and abandons his still-intact aircraft by parachute. Gordon's wife Nicole is killed by German air-attack whilst fleeing as a refugee but Fitz's wife Mary reaches England. The surviving pilots are likewise evacuated.
5	"May 1940"	30 October 1988
August 1940 - Hornet squadron is reinforced in readiness to take part in the Battle of Britain. Gordon has been rendered eccentric and mentally unstable by grief, but he continues to fly combat missions. Amongst the new pilots are a Czech pilot named 'Haddy' Haducek, a Pole named 'Zab' Zabarnowski and a nervous Englishman Steele-Stebbing who Moggy chooses as his next victim for bullying. Hornet squadron are soon in the thick of the action as the German air-force repeatedly attack South-East Britain. To his horror, Steele-Stebbing is ordered by Moggy to destroy an un-armed German rescue plane.
6	"August 1940"	6 November 1988
Flip Moran has been killed, horribly burning to death and there is an awkward moment when his family arrive at the aerodrome and ask to see the body. The squadron's generally poor standard of marksmanship becomes apparent and Intelligence Officer Skelton is sceptical about the numbers of enemy planes it is claiming to shoot down. Skelton is appalled when Moggy refuses to show any remorse when a Spitfire he has bailed out of crashes into a town, killing four civilians. Fitz is killed in action and, in her grief, his pregnant widow Mary begins lurking around the edge of the aerodrome, which the other pilots find disturbing. Zabarnowski is killed, followed by Gordon. On 7 September, the German airforce stages a massive raid on London and every available RAF fighter squadron is flown into action. Hornet squadron has only five Spitfires left intact and Barton, Patterson, Moggy, Haddy and Hart fly into battle. They inflict heavy damage on the enemy but suffer in return. Haddy is the first to be killed. Hart pursues a crippled German fighter but decides to spare it, only to be shot down by another from behind. Hart's parachute catches fire and he plummets to his death. Moggy shoots down three German planes, getting the third right over his own aerodrome, but is surprised and killed from behind by another. Barton and Patterson are the only two survivors. A postscript describes how the battle on 7 September marked a turning-point in the Battle of Britain and the aerial campaign soon ended in defeat for the Germans.

== Releases ==
The series (in its complete original format of six episodes) was released on Region-1 DVD through BFS Entertainment in a 3-disc set in 2000 and has been re-issued in a new edition (also via BFS and in Region 1) in March 2011.

When the series was screened on Network Seven in Australia in 1990, the original run-time of over five hours was shortened to less than four so that it could be shown in two two-hour episodes (plus commercials). In order to condense the series, a considerable amount of footage was cut, mostly from scenes on the ground including some entire scenes such as when Chris Hart invites one of the ground-crew LAC Todd to play squash and the press conference held on Hornet Squadron's airfield in France.

== Production ==
Six mock-up Spitfires were built as static or ground-running props. Most were destroyed during the air-raid sequences later in filming.

Original plans called for six Spitfires to be used in the UK filming of the series (a Mk.1a, a Mk.VIIIc, three Mk.IXs and a PR.Mk.XI), but the owner of the Mk.VIIIc could not participate after a family member was severely injured in an unrelated air accident and filming commenced with five Spitfires painted in a generic period-correct scheme. A sixth Spitfire was flown in the US for the bomber shoot-down scenes with a Heinkel He 111.

Veteran display pilot Ray Hanna (1928-2005) performed the scene where a Spitfire flies under a bridge in France. The scene itself was filmed by the stone bridge at Winston near Barnard Castle and Hanna, a New Zealand-born former RAF fighter pilot and Red Arrows leader, flew his own Spitfire LF.Mk.IX "MH434/G-ASJV" for the sequence. Hanna's son Mark also flew in the production.

The series used footage from the 1969 motion picture Battle of Britain for many of the dogfight scenes. Air-to-air filming of the aerial sequences was done with a vintage B-25 Mitchell bomber, Harvard trainer and an Agusta 109 helicopter, all of which served as camera ships for the shoot.

The production made use of three vintage Messerschmitt Bf 109s which were actually Hispano Ha 1112 Buchons, a Merlin-powered version of the Bf 109 that was used by the Spanish Air-Force up until the late 1960s. These same aircraft later also appeared in the motion-picture Memphis Belle in 1990. To portray Luftwaffe bombers in the series, two Heinkel He 111 (also Spanish-built versions) were used. An airworthy example was filmed in an aerial battle with a Spitfire (both operated by the Confederate Air Force) in Texas, USA and in the UK a partially dismantled aircraft was used for the filming of the scene where Hornet Squadron visits the crash site of their very first 'kill' in France. The 'crashed' Heinkel, registered G-AWHB, was flown to the UK from Spain in 1968 to be used in the filming of the movie Battle of Britain and later appeared in the film Patton.

For the scene where Cattermole and Steele-Stebbing destroy a German rescue aircraft, a vintage Junkers Ju 52 (Spanish-built CASA-353L) was used.

Scenes at the 'Chateau St. Pierre' were filmed at Charlton Park, Wiltshire, where the Earl of Suffolk has a private airstrip. The airfield used to represent 'RAF Bodkin Hazel' was the long-disused RAF Friston sited on the East Sussex coast alongside the imposing Seven Sisters cliffs. Some of the exterior filming for the first episode of the series (at Hornet Squadron's original base, "RAF Kingsmere") was completed at South Cerney airfield in Gloucestershire UK which, in 1988, still featured several period hangars and a pre-war control tower.

For the French airfield scenes at "Le Touquet", the producers filmed at Cambridge Airport.

In an interview in 2010, Derek Robinson, author of the original novel Piece of Cake remarked that when the novel was first published in 1983, the first edition sold poorly in the UK, although it did well in the US. He credits the 1988 LWT production with greatly reviving interest in the novel.
