= RAF slang =

Slang terms used in the Royal Air Force

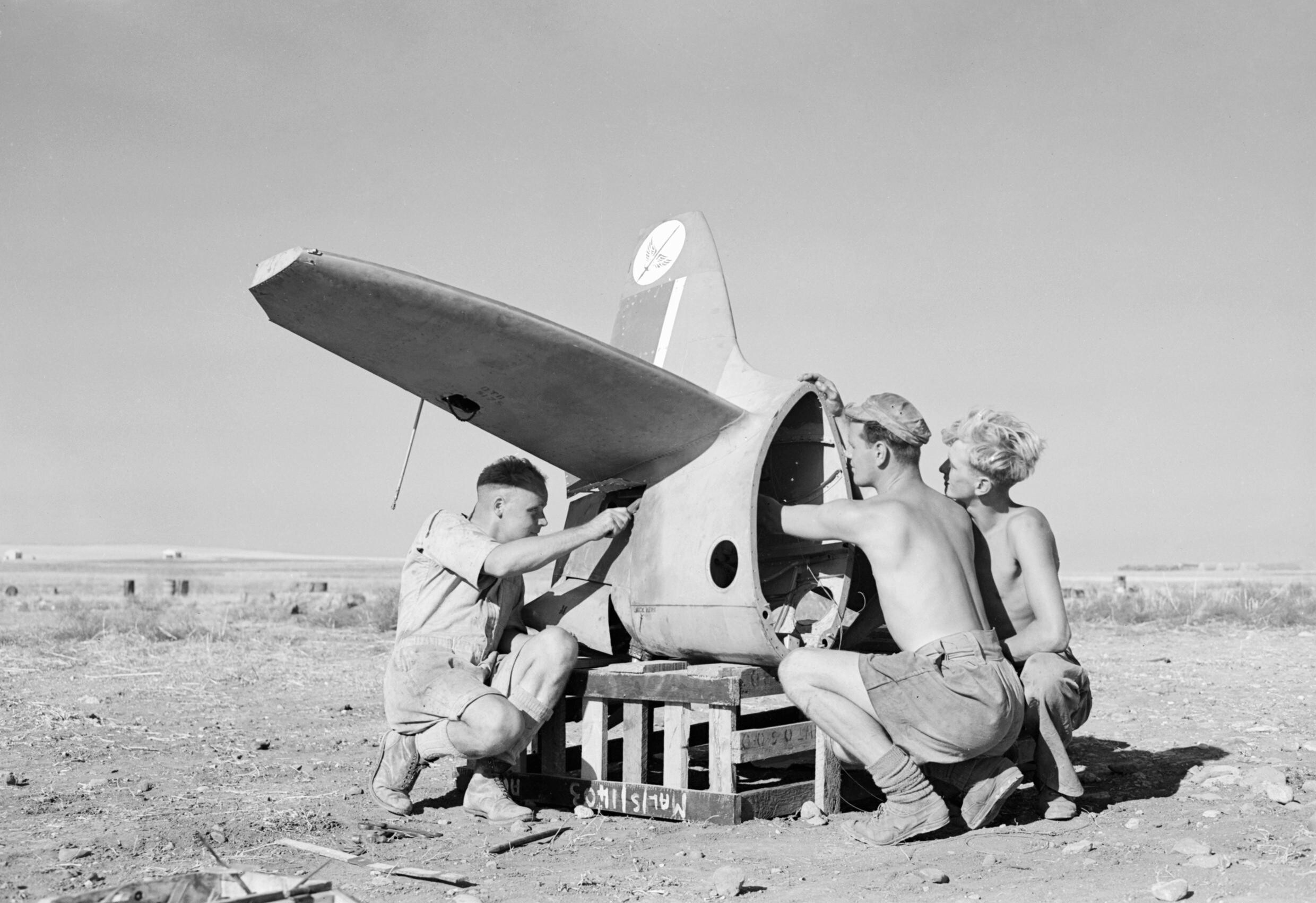
A party of riggers working on the tailplane of a Supermarine Spitfire during World War II

The Royal Air Force (RAF) developed a distinctive slang which has been documented in works such as Piece of Cake and the Dictionary of RAF slang.

The following is a comprehensive selection of slang terms and common abbreviations used by Royal Air Force from before World War II until the present day; less common abbreviations are not included. The slang of the RAF (sometimes referred to as Slanguage), developed partially from its antecedents of the Royal Flying Corps and Royal Naval Air Service, however, some phrases developed with less certainty of their origin.

Often common colloquial terms are used as well by airmen, in addition, some terms have come into common parlance such as "I pranged the car last night". Other slang was used by British and Empire air forces. There were a number of codes used within the RAF, not now under the official secrets act, some of which are included. Terms such as Jankers and Brylcreem Boys do not apply as the first was a general military term for someone under military discipline, and the latter was how the RAF were referred to by others.

It is followed by a list of nicknames of aircraft used by, or familiar to, the RAF.

== A ==
- Air officer – a term used to describe the top five ranks in the RAF; (from lowest to top rank) air commodore, air vice-marshal, air marshal, air chief marshal, and marshal of the Royal Air Force.
- All arms and legs – a term for weak beer.
- Angel – a height of 1,000 feet (300 m). This is referenced in the film Angels One Five, meaning aircraft at 15,000 feet (4,600 m).
- Apron – the tarmac or concreted hardstanding area surrounding a hangar.
- Auggies – (pronounced oggies), members of the Royal Auxiliary Air Force (RAuxAF).

== B ==
- Backroom Boys – term used for military scientists (boffins).
- Bale out (or Bail out) – to jump out of a stricken aircraft and parachute down to earth.
- Banana Boat – an aircraft carrier.
- Bandit – an enemy aircraft.
- Bang-on – right on target, a direct hit on a target by a bomb, bullseye.
- Belt–up – RAF slang from the 1930s meaning to be quiet.
- Best Blue – the Number 1 uniform worn by RAF personnel, usually for parades, but also when someone was 'under restrictions'.
- Bimble – a wander around; "We'll just bimble down to the mess".
- Bimble Box – packed lunch.
- Blanket Drill – to take a nap, sleep.
- Blower – the telephone.
- Boffin – a scientist or technical person.
- Bogey – an unidentified aircraft, suspected of being hostile.
- Bone Dome – a flying helmet.
- Bought it – to be killed, or shot down by enemy fire.
- Brolly – a parachute, particularly when used to 'Bale out'.
- Buckshee – something that was free, gratis.
- Bumf – paperwork or boring reading. Originally used to describe leaflets dropped as a means of psychological operations over enemy territory; the term derives from 'bum-fodder'.
- Burton, gone for a – a widely used term, but in RAF slang meaning someone who has gone missing, or more likely, had been killed on operations.
- Bus driver – a slang term used by fighter pilots to describe bomber pilots.

== C ==
- (The) Chair force – desk-bound, ground personnel, see also: 'shiny'.
- Char – a drink of tea.
- Chauffeurs Electronic – pilots of Shackletons, Nimrods etc.
- Clot – archaic, mildly derogative term used to describe someone prone to idiotic tendencies.

== D ==
- Dhobi – laundry.
- Dhobi dust – washing powder.
- (the) Ditch – the English Channel.
- (to) Ditch (or Ditching) – to either bale out into, or land an aircraft, in the sea (also known as In the drink).

== E ==
- Erk – short for aircraftman, came to mean any low rank person or beginner, an old RAF nickname originating in the First World War; it started out as airk.

== F ==
- Fang farrier – a dentist.
- (Mr) Fireworks – an armaments officer.
- Flap – to panic, or a disturbance on station, i.e., "What's the flap?"
- (to) Fly a desk – a job that a pilot does in the RAF after they have ceased their flying career.
- Fruit salad - a large array of medal ribbons on someone's uniform.

== G ==
- Gash – used by all three services to describe something that is rubbish, but additionally, in the RAF, is used as a meaning of anything free; e.g., "any chance of a gash job to check the brakes on my car".
- Gen – information of any kind, e.g., "What's the gen?" This could either be reliable information, (Pukka Gen) or unreliable, (Duff Gen).
- Glamour boys – derogatory term for fighter pilots.
- God botherer – a chaplain in the RAF, or padre.
- (To) Go pear–shaped – something that has gone wrong, Refers to the look of an aircraft that has crashed nose first.
- Gravel crusher – an NCO who was employed to drill the airmen.
- Gremlin – an unknown mischievous sprite that was blamed for anything that went wrong with an aircraft, e.g., "The gremlins have been at it again!"
- Grow-bag – the flying suit that pilots wear, said to be so named because of the untidy appearance of both items; grow-bag by extension can also be used as a description of aircrew; "The grow-bags are heading out for lunch".
- Gunners – a term for the RAF Regiment ground defence and fighting troops.

== H ==
- Happy Valley – a name for the Ruhr Valley in Germany which was heavily bombed during the Second World War.
- Heat wagon – a fire engine.

== I ==
- In a spot – in some difficulty, as in "..in a spot of bother.."

== J ==
- (The) Japs – native Japanese people.
- (The) Juice – the North Sea.

== K ==
- Kipper Fleet – derogatory name for Coastal Command.
- Kite – a term used to describe any aircraft.

== L ==
- Liney – an aircraft mechanic, or someone who works on the aircraft flight line.

== M ==
- Mae West – a lifebelt worn around the upper body which was inflated if aircrew went into the sea; its name derives, by way of rhyming slang, from the bust of the voluptuous American actress.
- Meat wagon – an ambulance, may also be used for those who 'bought it'.
- Milk run (or Milk round) – a sortie against an easy target, especially one which could be used to break in inexperienced bomber crews.

== N ==
- Nickel – a sortie over enemy territory to drop leaflets (bumf).
- Noddy Suit – an NBC suit.

== O ==
- Oppo – a friend or colleague, from my opposite number.

== P ==
- Pebble Monkey – a term used to describe very junior RAF Regiment officers (see Rock Ape).
- Piece of cake – a task performed with relative ease
- Plumber – a member of the armament trade, originated from when ammunition contained lead (Pb being the chemical formula for lead); though later came to be a reference to almost any ground trade associated with aircraft.
- Prang – to achieve a direct hit, or to crash one's own aircraft; a term originating in the Second World War, it also gave rise to the term Wizard Prang, meaning wonderful or an extremely accurate hit on a target. Prang derives from the Malay word Pĕrang, which means war.
- Prune – someone who is foolish or not to be looked up to or respected; stems from a Second World War cartoon character, Pilot Officer Prune, who does everything wrong and risks his safety and that of others. A modern-day equivalent in the RAF safety journal (Air Clues), is Wing Commander Spry.

== Q ==
- QRA – Quick Reaction Alert. The maintenance of ready armed aircraft awaiting scramble at a moments notice to intercept unknown aircraft entering UK airspace.

== R ==
- Rigger – an airframe mechanic or technician.
- Rock ape – slang but inwardly affectionate term for a member of the RAF Regiment.
- Ropey – an adjective used to describe something bad; "That was a ropey landing".

== S ==
- Scramble – a term that came into use during the Second World War, particularly during the Battle of Britain; scramble was used to alert ground and aircrews of an incoming attack in their area of operation, and rapidly launch aircraft.
- Scrambled egg – the gold braid on high-ranking officers' parade uniforms, and the gold adornment on the visor of their SD hat.
- Scuffer – a nickname for members of the Royal Air Force Police.
- Snowdrop – a nickname for personnel of the RAF Police (RAFP). The name derives from the white hats that the RAFP wear.
- Sparks – a wireless operator.
- Swanning (around) – to waste time. In the immediate aftermath of VE Day, personnel using official transport for less than official business were said to be swanning around. Seemingly derived from the nature of swans swimming upon a lake which appeared to be "haphazard".

== T ==
- Tail–end Charlie – nickname for the rear gunner in a bomber aircraft.
- Tin fish – a torpedo.
- Trenchard Brat – an aircraft apprentice, so named after Lord Trenchard, who initiated the apprentice scheme in the RAF.
- Type – a person (usually male); as in "he's a ropey type".

== U ==
- US (often U/S) - unserviceable.

== W ==
- Winco – Wing Commander.

== Y ==
- Yellow peril – now archaic, but previously used to describe the colour of elementary training aircraft; there is still a nod to this with the yellow and black colour scheme used on the training helicopters at the Defence Helicopter Flying School.

== Aircraft nicknames ==
- Chippie – a de Havilland Chipmunk.
- Fat Albert – Lockheed Hercules (all variants).
- Flying Cigar (The) – a Wellington bomber.
- Funbus – Vickers VC10.
- Growler – Avro Shackleton. Also known as the White Whale or Old Grey Lady, the latter two being names adopted due to the colour schemes used. The nickname The Growler was used more often, and related to the engine noise.
- Hali, Hally, Haly – Handley Page Halifax.
- Lizzie – a Lysander aircraft.
- Mossie – a de Havilland DH98 Mosquito.
- Spit, Spitter, Bomfire – Supermarine Spitfire
- Tiffy – originally for the Hawker Typhoon, now for the Eurofighter Typhoon.
- Timmy – Lockheed L-1011 TriStar.
- Tonka – Panavia Tornado (all variants).
- Wokka (or The Mighty Wokka) – a Chinook helicopter.

== In popular culture ==
Monty Python's Flying Circus featured a sketch named "RAF Banter".
