= USS Goshawk (AM-79) =

Minesweeper of the United States Navy

History

United States
- Name: USS Goshawk
- Builder: Foundation (Marine) Co., Savannah, Georgia
- Launched: 1919, as M/V Penobscot
- Acquired: 3 September 1940, as AMc-4
- Commissioned: 3 March 1941
- Decommissioned: 1 August 1945
- Reclassified: AM-79, 25 November 1940; IX-195, 10 October 1944
- Stricken: 3 January 1946
- Fate: Transferred to the Maritime Commission, 7 May 1946

General characteristics
- Class & type: Goshawk class minesweeper
- Displacement: 585 long tons (594 t)
- Length: 150 ft (46 m)
- Beam: 25 ft (7.6 m)
- Draft: 10 ft 3 in (3.12 m)
- Propulsion: 1 × 400 shp (298 kW) New London Ship and Engine Company diesel engine, one shaft
- Speed: 10 knots (19 km/h; 12 mph)
- Armament: 1 × 3"/50 caliber gun

USS Goshawk (AM-79), was a Goshawk class minesweeper built in 1919 as the steel-hulled fishing trawler M/V Penobscot by the Foundation (Marine) Co., Savannah, Georgia, for Mr. W. F. Henningsen, Seattle, Washington.

The ship was acquired by the United States Navy on 3 September 1940, and began conversion to a Coastal Minesweeper, AMc-4 at the Winslow Marine Co., Winslow, Washington. Renamed Goshawk on 16 October 1940, and reclassified as a Minesweeper, AM-79, on 25 November 1940, she was commissioned USS Goshawk (AM 79) on 3 March 1941. Conversion to a minesweeper was completed on 20 March 1941.

== U.S. Navy career ==
After shakedown, Goshawk took up minesweeping duties in Puget Sound and the Strait of Juan de Fuca, operating out of Seattle, Washington. She sailed for Alaska on 6 October 1941 and swept the channels between Sitka, Ketchikan, Adak, Seward, and Kodiak Island until 30 March 1942, when she returned to Seattle for extensive refitting.

Goshawk resumed duty on 18 August in the Seattle and Puget Sound area and in late 1943 returned to Alaska as a combination minesweeper and small cargo vessel. Her classification was officially changed to Unclassified Miscellaneous Auxiliary, IX-195, on 10 October 1944. Goshawk returned to Seattle on 9 June 1945 and decommissioned there on 1 August, but continued to perform in an "in service" status, transporting condemned ammunition for the 13th Naval District.

Goshawk was decommissioned on 1 August 1945 at Seattle, Washington, and placed in service; transferred to the Maritime Commission for disposal on 7 May 1946. Struck from the Naval Register on 3 January 1946, the ship was sold to Alvin T. Davies of Tacoma, Washington, and renamed M/V Bering Sea. Fate unknown.
