= Goshawk Squadron =

1971 black comedy novel

- Author: Derek Robinson
- Language: English
- Publication date: 1971

Goshawk Squadron is a 1971 black comedy novel by Derek Robinson which tells of the adventures of a squadron of SE5a pilots from January 1918 to the time of the German spring offensive of March 1918. Goshawk Squadron was Robinson's first novel. The story introduces the character Stanley Woolley, the commander of the squadron — a man who Robinson himself says is not the sort of man you'd want your daughter to marry.

== Synopsis ==
Goshawk Squadron follows a front-line squadron of British pilots late in the war. The commanding officer is Major Stanley Woolley, a cold, cruel and sour taskmaster, training the squadron with brutality. Despite being only 23 years old, the years of war and slaughter have hardened Woolley into a humourless cynic. Woolley especially hates the delusions that replacements have about air combat being gallant and chivalrous. Woolley keeps no emotional attachments, even to his girlfriend Margery, a nurse in the Hospital Corps.

The Germans begin Operation Michael, which leads to a relentless bloodbath. The squadron gets cut to pieces in the endless grind of combat. When Margery's field station gets bombed, she is erroneously reported dead. Realizing how much he did love her, Woolley is shattered and he is incredibly relieved when she appears unharmed. Woolley's unemotional manner is stripped away by this close call. Distracted by the thought of Margery and the life they could have together, Woolley is killed while leading the next combat patrol.

== Reception ==
A review of the book on wordpress.com states that it is now regarded as something of a classic and that 'Robinson searingly conjures up the brutality and insanity of the war'. The book was recognised at the time of its publication for its quality and was nominated for the Booker Prize for Fiction in 1971.
