= Piece of Cake (novel) =

1983 novel by Derek Robinson

- First edition
- Author: Derek Robinson
- Language: English
- Genre: War novel
- Publisher: Hamish Hamilton
- Publication date: 1983
- Publication place: United Kingdom
- Media type: Print (Hardcover)
- Pages: 672 pp
- Followed by: A Good Clean Fight

Piece of Cake is a 1983 novel by Derek Robinson which follows a fictional Royal Air Force fighter squadron through the first year of World War II, and the Battle of Britain. It was later made into the 1988 television serial Piece of Cake.

Although a work of fiction, the novel purports to be as historically accurate as possible. Notable themes are the development of aerial warfare tactics, the Hawker Hurricane fighter, the British class system within its military, and the difficulty of training and integrating new pilots during wartime. The novel was controversial because it challenged the greatly inflated British claims of Luftwaffe aircraft destroyed during the Battle of Britain, and theorized that the air battle was "irrelevant" to the possibility of a Nazi invasion of Britain following the fall of France. Robinson defends his work by stating that the truth of "faults and deficiencies" only enhances admiration for the courage and resilience of RAF pilots.

== Plot summary ==
September 1939, World War II is about to begin: The young, brash and inexperienced pilots of Hornet Squadron, a unit of the Royal Air Force's Fighter Command equipped with the Hawker Hurricane Mk. I, are not inclined to take the impending war very seriously. Squadron Leader Ramsey, who has been drilling his men hard, is eager to get into action. Returning from a practise flight, he inadvertently taxis his Hurricane into a slit-trench, upending the aircraft and, too impatient to wait for a ladder, falls from the cockpit and fatally breaks his neck.

His temporary replacement is New Zealander 'Fanny' Barton whose authority is rejected by most of the pilots. Ordered to intercept an incoming group of aircraft, Barton attacks what he believes is a German bomber and shoots it down, only to later realise it was a British Blenheim. He is sent away to face a court of enquiry whilst Squadron Leader Rex, an upper-crust and calmly confident pilot, arrives to take command.

The squadron is despatched to a new airfield in France to await the expected German attack. Billeted in a luxury chateau, the pilots enjoy a comfortable lifestyle. In return, Rex expects strict discipline amongst his pilots and adherence to the textbook tactics of the RAF including close-formation flying and the cumbersome 'fighting area' attacks. The Phoney-War begins as winter sets in. Pilot Officer 'Moggy' Cattermole bullies several of the other pilots, in particularly young Dickie Starr and mentally fragile 'Sticky' Stickwell. Cattermole flies his Hurricane under a low bridge, goading Starr and 'Pip' Patterson to do the same. Starr attempts the stunt and is killed. Cattermole shows no remorse.

A new replacement arrives, an American named Christopher Hart the Third, soon nicknamed 'CH3'. A veteran of the Spanish Civil War, he is unimpressed with the rigid, by-the-book tactics of the RAF and this leads to disagreements and hostility with some of the other pilots. Barton also returns to the squadron. Hornet achieves its first aerial victory when they destroy a German Dornier Do 17 bomber. CH3 is unimpressed that it takes six pilots to down a single, already crippled bomber, partly due to the poor gunnery skills of many of the pilots. Journalist Jackie Bellamy is keen to portray the war as a glorious adventure against an evil foe and cannot understand CH3's cynicism. Two of the pilots, 'Flash' Gordon and 'Fitz' Fitzgerald, begin respective romances with two local schoolteachers, French woman Nicole and expat Englishwoman Mary. Both couples eventually marry, although Fitzgerald experiences problems with sexual impotency.

Fed up with Cattermole's bullying, Stickwell flies an unauthorised sortie, strafing a Luftwaffe airfield, but his aircraft is damaged and he crash-lands in Belgium. The squadron rescue him but Rex cannot forgive the incident and Stickwell is transferred to another unit. CH3 is increasingly at odds with the other pilots over his refusal to adhere to RAF tactics.

The German Invasion of France and Belgium (Blitzkrieg) begins on 10 May 1940. Hornet Squadron's tactics are soon proved dangerously inadequate, especially to the pilots flying at the rear. In the first days, three inexperienced pilots are killed without the rest of the squadron even seeing the German Bf 109 fighters that shoot them down. Whilst escorting a bomber attack against German ground forces, 'Moke' Miller is badly wounded and later dies in hospital. The remaining pilots at first doubt and then despise the outmoded tactics but Rex refuses to alter them. A bombing raid leaves Rex badly injured by shrapnel but he conceals his wounds from the other pilots and strong painkillers leave him euphoric and overconfident. Recklessly ordering Hornet Squadron to attack a much larger German formation, Rex dives down to his death but another pilot orders the others not to follow, several of the pilots deliberately crowding Barton's plane, preventing him from following Rex.

Now acting Squadron Leader, Barton tries to rally his demoralised men, including a terrified Patterson and a cynical CH3. But the German advance is sweeping across France and Hornet Squadron has been reduced to a mere handful of Hurricanes still intact. Fleeing as a refugee, Nicole gets a lift with a motorcyclist but is killed in an accidental crash. Mary manages to reach England as do the survivors of Hornet Squadron.

In August, Hornet Squadron is reformed and made operational again just as the Battle of Britain enters its most intense phase. Of the original pilots, only eight remain: Barton, CH3, Cattermole, Patterson, Fitzgerald, Gordon, 'Mother' Cox and Irishman 'Flip' Moran. Amongst the replacements are Czech pilot 'Haddy' Haducek, Pole 'Zab' Zabarnowski, mild-mannered Englishman Steele-Stebbing, cocky 'Bing' MacFarlane and young 'Nim' Renouf. They are soon seeing heavy action as the German Luftwaffe switches from attacking Channel convoys and begins an offensive against RAF airfields in southeast England. Hornet Squadron is using better tactics: shooting at closer range, flying in pairs, constantly checking the sky above and behind whilst in the air. Gordon has become eccentric and reckless after his wife's death. Cattermole finds a new victim for his bullying in Steele-Stebbing. Cattermole orders a reluctant Renouf to destroy an unarmed German Heinkel He 59 rescue plane over the Channel. Moran, now a flight commander, is reluctant to accept Barton's authority.

Intelligence Officer 'Skull' Skelton is sceptical about the numbers of German aircraft that Fighter Command is claiming to shoot down, as is Jackie Bellamy who has become cynical about the conduct of the war. The inadequate training of new pilots and the poor gunnery skills are soon painfully obvious. Skelton becomes very unpopular when he refuses to confirm all of the pilot's victory claims.

The battle continues to intensify and all of the pilots begin to suffer exhaustion and nervous strain. Moran is horribly burnt to death when he is shot down. 'Bing' MacFarlane destroys two German planes and performs a forbidden 'Victory Roll' which causes him to fatally crash. Cattermole meets up with Stickwell, finding out the latter is now a pilot in a two-seater Defiant squadron. Stickwell flies into action as a gunner and is killed. On the same day, Fitzgerald, his aircraft damaged, gets lost in dense fog and vanishes at sea. His wife Mary, now pregnant, refuses to accept that her husband is dead and is soon seen hanging around the aerodrome perimeter, which the other pilots find disturbing. Gordon's eccentricity grows more acute and infuriates the more seriously minded CH3. Zabarnowski is killed in action and several new pilots are also lost, sometimes not even lasting a single day. Cattermole bails out from a defective Hurricane and his unmanned aircraft crashes into a town and kills four civilians. Skelton is appalled at Cattermole's refusal to show any remorse. Steele-Stebbing retaliates against Cattermole with a practical joke and the two appear to declare an unofficial truce. Cattermole angrily forces Mary to cease her vigil and leave the aerodrome.

It is now September 1940 and the Battle of Britain is reaching its height. The survivors of Hornet squadron are exhausted and at breaking point. Haducek is killed and Renouf is badly burned. Gordon is badly wounded and later dies, news of his death hitting a battle-fatigued CH3 particularly hard. Jackie Bellamy discusses with the pilots the possibility of a German Invasion of Britain and she concludes, aided by the expert knowledge and input from a Royal Navy fighter pilot drafted into the squadron that the Germans lack the naval capacity to do so. On 7 September, the Luftwaffe launches a massed attack against London and every available RAF fighter unit is flung into action, including Hornet Squadron. Steele-Stebbing and Cattermole are both killed. Cox bails out and Patterson force-lands but both remain alive. The story ends with Barton and CH3 diving yet again to attack the massed ranks of German bombers.

== Reception ==
In an interview in 2009, the novel's author Derek Robinson remarked that when the novel was first published in the UK in 1983, it sold very poorly although sales were better in the US. It was not until the release of the LWT mini-series based on the novel in 1988 that sales of the book greatly improved.

Angus Calder wrote about the novel in 1991, saying that

The ex-public school types in Hornet Squadron are variously oafish, stupid, callow, neurotically disturbed or (in one case) positively evil...Cattermole is a relentless practical joker, liar, bully and thief with homicidal propensities which make him (Robinson's text insinuates) just the right type to be a fighter pilot...After destroying most of his pilots in horrible ways, minutely described, with uncannily precise technical know-how, Robinson, resisting closure, is bound to suggest a kind of 'point' by his selection of those who are still alive in the last pages. [Robinson can] demonstrate his virtuosity by making somehow tolerable page after page of silly RAF backchat linked with pointless and sometimes cruel horseplay; he can emphasise stresses and fatigues which destroy men's judgement and set us up to mock the crumbling organisation of Fighter Command. But he cannot end with the Luftwaffe winning: because it didn't. (The pilots) might not be chivalric young Englishmen but they are still in the air fighting at the end, as indeed their whole groggy Command was. Robinson's book is very exciting and often, in gallows-humour mode, very funny. However he cannot counteract his reader's knowledge of the Big Fact (the Allied victory), which at times makes his approach to the battle seem wilfully cynical.

A 1984 book review by Kirkus Reviews concluded; "Robinson fails to develop enough character-texture in his large, oddly faceless cast-of-characters—giving an overlong novel only chronology as a shaping force. With stern, shrewd editing, then, this might have been the most powerful of RAF novels. As it is, it's superb in the first third, sporadically hilarious, always strongly narrated, but increasingly routine (and repetitious) in its preachier second half: a bulky mixed bag for the WW Il-aviation audience."

== Quotes ==
- "They're all a bit mad, you know. They wouldn't do it unless there was a damn good chance of getting killed, wouldn't they? So they can't be completely normal. They're not what you'd call model citizens, any of them. More like Vandals, I suppose. They're just itching to be turned loose with an eight-gun Hurricane on some lumbering great bomber. I mean that's your average fighter pilot's attitude, isn't it? Show him something, anything really, and deep down inside, his first reaction is: What sort of a mess could I make of that with a couple of three-second bursts? Herd of cows, doubledecker bus, garden party--makes no difference what it is, that's the thought in the back of his mind. Not surprising, really. I've often thought it's a damn good job they're in the RAF, otherwise they'd all be out there blowing up banks."
- "The whole purpose of the armed forces can be summed up in one word – killing. Now, I don’t find that goal – in your words – marvelous, or magnificent, and try as I might I cannot bring myself to feel proud of it. Grateful, perhaps, as one is selfishly grateful for the existence of men who keep the sewage system working. But proud? No."
- "One tries to be open minded. If anyone can show me the glamour in a man’s head getting blown off, I shall do my best to see it."
- "You know… leadership is a confidence trick. You have to persuade men that you can do absolutely anything, otherwise they lose confidence in you and instead of following eagerly into the jaws of death they begin wondering whether perhaps they should go to the lavatory instead."
- "My idea of an honourable solution is winning. I want every possible advantage I can get – fair, unfair or downright deplorable. I’ve never yet met an enemy pilot who was willing to compromise, and neither am I."
- "Five minutes was enough to tell Moran that Haducek was an excellent fighter pilot… He could do all the usual things with a Hurricane and several very unusual things, plus a couple of things that Moran had no wish to copy in case the wings came off."
- "It was perfectly obvious that if I sat in that kite it was bound to crash and I would probably get killed. Anyone with an ounce of gallantry would have stayed at the controls and tried to miss the innocent bystanders. I haven’t got an ounce of gallantry. I don’t intend to kill myself to save three and a half civilians. It’s their war as well as mine, so they can jolly well take some of the risk."
- "You make it sound as if all we have to do to win is not lose. It’s not that easy! You don’t win wars just by not losing. People need a victory, they need to prove themselves… We’ve got to beat the Luftwaffe just to show it can be done."

== Historical links ==
- In the novel, the character of Moggy Cattermole is pursuing a mortally damaged German bomber and he notices that one of the Luftwaffe crewmen has become hopelessly stuck in the escape hatch beneath the aircraft, his legs dangling in mid-air. Cattermole shoots him dead. A similar real-life incident occurred in December 1941 when Wing-Commander Robert Stanford Tuck, then leading the Biggin Hill Fighter Wing, with the aid of another pilot, shot down a Junkers Ju 88 over the Channel. A solitary survivor was sighted floating in the water, without a dinghy and many miles from the Dutch coast and with no ships in sight to rescue him. Tuck, wishing to spare the German airman a slow, painful death from exposure, strafed the water and killed him. Tuck later wrote, "If that were me, down there.....this is what I would want to happen. It was the right thing, the only thing to do. But I will tell no one, for some may not understand."
- When the character of 'Flip' Moran is shot down, he dies horribly, trapped in a flaming cockpit. When his relatives arrive to collect the coffin with his remains, they request to see the body. Adjutant Kellaway has to uncomfortably explain that it would be inappropriate due to the circumstances of his death. The incident was mirrored in the actual experiences of Wing-Commander H R 'Dizzy' Allen who flew Spitfires with No 66 Squadron during the Battle of Britain. In September 1940, one of his comrades was killed when his fighter crashed in a full-speed, vertical dive. Little of the body was recovered and the coffin's interior was lined with sandbags to give it some weight. He wrote, "...his parents arrived, having received the fatality signal, and requested that they be allowed to a last look at their son. Fortunately, the officer in charge of the funeral tactfully pointed out that...it would be a rather unpleasant experience for them to see it in that condition. All they would have seen, in fact, was a jampot surrounded by sandbags".

== Miscellaneous information ==
- In the final pages of the book there is a group discussion about Hitler's prospects for a successful invasion of Great Britain. After examining the problems of attempting a covert crossing of the English Channel they are led to the conclusion that it is impossible because of the Royal Navy. However, the character Hart insists that the Battle of Britain is nonetheless crucial, because to win the war the RAF must not just avoid losing: it must show that the Luftwaffe can be beaten.
- The book was followed by a sequel, A Good Clean Fight, following the exploits of a number of the surviving characters of Piece of Cake in North Africa.
- The very first publication by Roald Dahl (author of Charlie and the Chocolate Factory, James and the Giant Peach, etc.) was a 1942 article that he had titled "A Piece of Cake" (although the title was changed in publication). Dahl was an ace RAF fighter pilot and the story was about his flying experiences in the war. The article was later rewritten as a short story, also called "A Piece of Cake," which was included in the collection Over to You.
