= List of Royal Flying Corps generals =

The following is a list of Royal Flying Corps generals. While officially general officers are not considered to belong to any regiment or corps (simply being "late" of their erstwhile regiment), in practice almost all the general officers to hold a Royal Flying Corps-related appointment gained their promotion to the general officer ranks in that appointment and remained in such appointments until the creation of the Royal Air Force on 1 April 1918. Royal Flying Corps generals then became Royal Air Force generals.

Two officers took up Royal Flying Corps related appointments while holding general officer rank: David Henderson was already a brigadier-general when the Royal Flying Corps was established, and Edward Ellington was promoted to brigadier-general while serving on the General Staff of the British VIII Corps in France, prior to taking up appointment as Deputy Director-General of Military Aeronautics. Conversely, Duncan MacInnes gained his promotion to brigadier-general while serving at the Military Aeronautics Directorate but subsequently served with the Royal Engineers.

== Senior generals ==
Ranks indicated are the highest rank the officer obtained while in the RFC.

Portrait	General	Highest rank	Promoted Brig-Gen	Promoted Maj-Gen	Promoted Lt-Gen	Notes
	Sir David Henderson	Lieutenant-General	4 April 1908	26 October 1914	24 March 1916	Promoted to brigadier-general before creation of Royal Flying Corps. Temporary promotion to lieutenant-general 24 March 1916, substantive promotion 1 January 1917.
	Sir Hugh Trenchard	Major-General	25 August 1915	24 March 1916	N/A	Temporary promotion to major-general 24 March 1916, substantive promotion 1 January 1917. Subsequently promoted to Marshal of the Royal Air Force.
	W S Brancker	Major-General	18 December 1915	22 June 1917	N/A	Temporary promotion to major-general 22 June 1917, rank made substantive in the RAF on 3 January 1918. Subsequently granted the equivalent rank of air vice-marshal.
	J M Salmond	Major-General	1 February 1916	22 June 1917	N/A	Temporary promotion to major-general 22 June 1917, rank made substantive in the RAF on 1 April 1918. Subsequently promoted to Marshal of the Royal Air Force.
	E B Ashmore	Major-General	30 January 1916	30 July 1917	N/A	Temporary promotion to major-general 30 July 1917, later regraded to air vice marshal in the RAF before being substantively promoted to major-general in the British Army on 1 January 1924.
	C A H Longcroft	Major-General	28 August 1916	18 October 1917	N/A	Temporary promotion to major-general on 18 October 1917, reverted to temporary brigadier-general on 29 April 1918, substantively promoted to air-vice marshal 1 July 1925.
	W G H Salmond	Major-General	1 July 1916	3 January 1918	N/A	Temporary promotion to major-general 3 January 1918. Later promoted to air chief marshal.
	T I Webb-Bowen	Brigadier-General	1 February 1916	N/A	N/A	Temporary promotion to brigadier-general. Promotion to acting major-general in the RAF on 1 February 1919, substantively promoted to air vice-marshal 1 July 1925.
	H R M Brooke-Popham	Brigadier-General	12 March 1916	N/A	N/A	Temporary promotion to brigadier-general. Later promoted to air chief marshal.
	D S MacInnes	Brigadier-General	27 March 1916	N/A	N/A	Temporary promotion to brigadier-general on 27 March 1916. Departed Royal Flying Corps duties in early 1917. Killed on the Western Front while holding the rank of brigadier-general on 23 May 1918.
	D le G Pitcher	Brigadier-General	1 April 1916	N/A	N/A	Temporary promotion to brigadier-general. Permanent promotion to air commodore on 5 August 1919.
	J F A Higgins	Brigadier-General	25 August 1916	N/A	N/A	Temporary promotion to brigadier-general followed by temporary promotion to major-general on 29 April 1918 in the RAF. Permanent promotion to air vice-marshal on 1 August 1919.
	P W Game	Brigadier-General	16 October 1916	N/A	N/A	Temporary promotion to brigadier-general followed by temporary promotion to major-general on 14 October 1918 in the RAF. Permanent promotion to air vice-marshal on 1 January 1922.
	J H W Becke	Brigadier-General	20 December 1916	N/A	N/A	Temporary promotion to brigadier-general. Retired on 29 February 1920 with the honorary rank of brigadier-general in the RAF.
	E. L. Ellington	Brigadier-General	14 January 1917	N/A	N/A	Temporary promotion to brigadier-general on 14 January 1917 but not appointed to Royal Flying Corps duties until 20 November 1917. Temporary promotion to major-general in the RAF on 10 April 1918. Permanent promotion to air-vice marshal the following year. Subsequently promoted to Marshal of the Royal Air Force.
	G S Shephard	Brigadier-General	8 February 1917	N/A	N/A	Temporary promotion to brigadier-general on 8 February 1917. Killed in a flying accident 19 January 1918.
	L E O Charlton	Brigadier-General	28 February 1917	N/A	N/A	Temporary promotion to brigadier-general on 28 February 1917. Permanent promotion to air commodore on 5 August 1919.
	W B Caddell	Brigadier-General	4 April 1917	N/A	N/A	Temporary promotion to brigadier-general on 4 April 1917. Retired from the RAF on 28 May 1919 with the honorary rank of brigadier-general.
	H C T Dowding	Brigadier-General	23 June 1917	N/A	N/A	Temporary promotion to brigadier-general on 23 June 1917. Later promoted to air chief marshal.
	C G Hoare	Brigadier-General	1 August 1917	N/A	N/A	Temporary promotion to brigadier-general on 1 August 1917. Relinquished his commission on 24 May 1919 when hold the rank of brigadier-general.
	P L W Herbert	Brigadier-General	5 August 1917	N/A	N/A	Temporary promotion to brigadier-general on 5 August 1917. Retired from the RAF on 3 December 1929 as an honorary air commodore.
	R E T Hogg	Brigadier-General	5 August 1917	N/A	N/A	Temporary promotion to brigadier-general on 5 August 1917. Retired from the RAF on 1 September 1919 as an honorary brigadier-general.
	G Livingston	Brigadier-General	9 August 1917	N/A	N/A	Temporary promotion to brigadier-general on 9 August 1917. Retired from the RAF on 14 February 1919 as an honorary brigadier-general.
	T C R Higgins	Brigadier-General	1 September 1917	N/A	N/A	Temporary promotion to brigadier-general on 1 September 1917. Substantive promotion to air commodore on 30 June 1922 and retired from the RAF on 1 November 1929 in that rank.
	F L Festing	Brigadier-General	10 October 1917	N/A	N/A	Temporary promotion to brigadier-general on 10 October 1917. Retired from the RAF after the war.
	E R Ludlow-Hewitt	Brigadier-General	17 October 1917	N/A	N/A	Temporary promotion to brigadier-general on 17 October 1917. Substantive promotion to air commodore on 30 June 1923. Later promoted to air chief marshal.
	J G Hearson	Brigadier-General	28 October 1917	N/A	N/A	Temporary promotion to brigadier-general on 28 October 1917. Substantive promotion to air commodore on 30 June 1923.
	A E Borton	Brigadier-General	14 December 1917	N/A	N/A	Temporary promotion to brigadier-general on 14 December 1917. Substantive promotion to air commodore on 1 October 1922. Later promoted to air vice-marshal.
	A Huggins	Brigadier-General	22 December 1917	N/A	N/A	Temporary promotion to brigadier-general on 22 December 1917. Retired from the RAF, retaining the rank, on 20 March 1919.
	C L N Newall	Brigadier-General	28 December 1917	N/A	N/A	Temporary promotion to brigadier-general on 28 December 1917. Substantive promotion to air commodore on 1 January 1925. Later promoted to marshal of the RAF.
	R R Smith-Barry	Brigadier-General	27 January 1918	N/A	N/A	Temporary promotion to brigadier-general on 27 January 1918. Rank relinquished on 23 February 1918. Promoted to substantive colonel in the RAF on 17 April 1918.
	A C Critchley	Brigadier-General	4 March 1918	N/A	N/A	Temporary promotion to brigadier-general on 4 March 1918. Retired from the RAF after the war. Rejoined during World War II and was promoted to air commodore on 1 June 1943.
	C F De S Murphy	Brigadier-General	6 March 1918	N/A	N/A	Temporary promotion to brigadier-general on 6 March 1918. Retired from the RAF after the war.

In addition to the above generals, Brigadier-General N J G Cameron was a member of the Royal Flying Corps reserve who had qualified as a military pilot. Unlike the above generals, Cameron never held a Royal Flying Corps appointment.

== General officer appointments and incumbents ==
=== War Office ===
- Director-General of Military Aeronautics
  - Sir David Henderson (1913–17)
  - J M Salmond (1917–18)
  - E. L. Ellington (1918)
- Deputy Director-General of Military Aeronautics
  - W S Brancker (1917)
  - E. L. Ellington (1917–18)
- Director of Air Organization
  - W S Brancker (1916–17)
  - L E O Charlton (1917)
  - G Livingston (1917–18)
- Director of Aircraft Equipment
  - D S MacInnes (1916–17)
  - W B Caddell (1917)
  - A Huggins (1917–18)

=== Commands ===
- General Officer Commanding the Royal Flying Corps in the Field (for France and Belgium)
  - Sir David Henderson (1914)
  - F H Sykes (1914) – did not hold general officer rank
  - Sir David Henderson (1914–15)
  - H M Trenchard (1915–18)
  - J M Salmond (1918) – continued to hold equivalent post in the RAF until 1919
- General Officer Commanding, Training Division
  - J M Salmond (1917)
  - C A H Longcroft (1917–1918)
  - E R Ludlow-Hewitt (1918)
- General Officer Commanding, London Air Defence Area
  - E B Ashmore (1917–1918)
- General Officer Commanding, Royal Flying Corps Middle East
  - W S Brancker (1917–1918)
  - W G H Salmond (1918)

=== Staff Officers ===
- Brigadier General General Staff, Royal Flying Corps in the Field
  - P W Game (1916–1918)
- Deputy Adjutant and Quartermaster General, Royal Flying Corps in the Field
  - H R M Brooke-Popham (1916–1917)
- Deputy Quartermaster General, Royal Flying Corps in the Field
  - H R M Brooke-Popham (1917–1918)
- Deputy Adjutant General, Royal Flying Corps in the Field
  - F L Festing (1917–1918)
- Brigadier General Royal Flying Corps Staff, Training Division
  - G Livingston (1917)
  - J G Hearson (1917–1918)
- Inspector of Training, Training Division
  - E R Ludlow-Hewitt (1917–1918)

=== Brigades ===
In late 1915 brigades started to be established in the RFC and so brigadier-generals were created. A list of brigade command appointments is at List of Royal Flying Corps brigades.
