= Edward Masterman =

Royal Air Force Air Commodore (1880–1957)

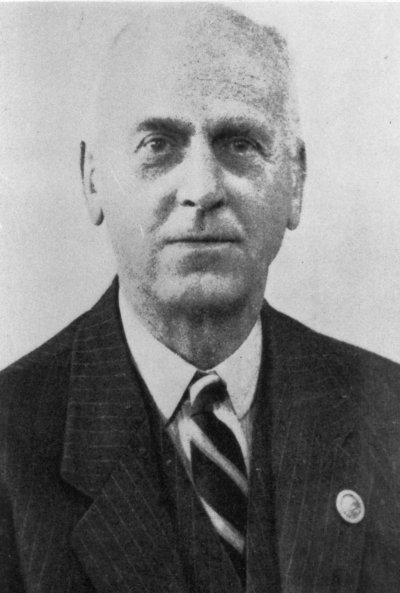
- Air Commodore Edward Masterman, pictured wearing an Observer Corps lapel badge and tie.
- Born: 15 April 1880
- Died: 26 August 1957 (aged 77); Aldershot, Hampshire
- Military career
- Allegiance: United Kingdom
- Branch: Royal Navy (c. 1894–1918); Royal Air Force (1918–29)
- Service years: 1894–1929
- Rank: Air Commodore
- Commands: No. 10 Group (1924–28); No. 7 Group (1923–24); Central Flying School (1922); No. 22 Group (1918–19); Farnborough Airship Station (1914–15); Naval Airship Section; HMS Vesuvius (1909–12)
- Conflicts: First World War
- Awards: Companion of the Order of the Bath; Companion of the Order of St Michael and St George; Commander of the Order of the British Empire; Air Force Cross
- Other work: Commandant of the Observer Corps (1929–36)

Air Commodore Edward Alexander Dimsdale Masterman, CB, CMG, CBE, AFC (15 April 1880 – 26 August 1957) was a senior officer in the Royal Air Force in the first half of the 20th century. After retiring from the RAF, he served as the first ever Commandant of the Observer Corps.

== Service career ==
Masterman started his service career in the Royal Navy, attending the Britannia Naval College around 1894. He served on HMS Revenge in the late 1890s and early 1900s, and was promoted to lieutenant in January 1900. After attending Torpedo Specialist Course he in 1907 worked as a Russia interpreter on HMS Vernon.

By 1911 Masterman had become involved in the Navy's efforts to build an experimental airship and the following year he was appointed Officer Commanding the Naval Airship Section.

During the First World War, Masterman served in the Royal Naval Air Service, commanding the Farnborough Airship Station and working in several technical posts; during this time he invented and patented the airship mooring mast with Barnes Wallis. With the establishment of the Royal Air Force on 1 April 1918, Masterman transferred to the new service. Just before the end of the war, he was promoted to brigadier general and appointed General Officer Commanding No. 22 Group. When separate RAF ranks were introduced on 1 August 1919 he became an Air Commodore. In 1922 Masterman was appointed as Commandant of the RAF's Central Flying School.

== Observer Corps ==
Between 1 March 1929 when he retired from the RAF and 1 April 1936, Masterman was Commandant of the Observer Corps and was the first former RAF officer to hold this appointment. Headquarters Observer Corps was located at Hillingdon House, RAF Uxbridge, relocating to RAF Bentley Priory after Masterman retired. He was succeeded as Commandant Observer Corps by Air Commodore Alfred Warrington-Morris.

Following his retirement as Commandant Observer Corps, Masterman immediately rejoined the Observer Corps as a civilian part-time volunteer with the rank of Observer Captain, (the equivalent of the RAF Group Captain), and served as the (Royal) Observer Corps’ Western Area Commandant between 1937 and 1942. (By special permission of Air Cdre Warrington-Morris, Masterman was permitted to wear his RAF Air Cdre uniform and rank braid after April 1941; the Observer Corps then becoming a uniformed organisation and restyled the Royal Observer Corps under the operational control of RAF Fighter Command).

Military offices
New title Group established	General Officer Commanding No. 22 Group; 1918–1919	Vacant Title next held by Duncan Pitcher
Preceded by Norman MacEwen	Commandant of the Central Flying School; 1922	Succeeded by Felton Holt
Preceded by Lionel Charlton	Air Officer Commanding No. 7 Group; 1923–1924	Succeeded by Arthur Longmore
Preceded by J L Forbes	Air Officer Commanding No. 10 Group; 1924–1928	Succeeded by Thomas Higgins
Government offices
New title Corps established	Commandant Observer Corps; 1929–1936	Succeeded by Alfred Warrington Morris
