= RAF Iraq Command =

Royal Air Force command in charge of British forces in Iraq (1922–1941)

- Founded: 1922–1941
- Country: United Kingdom
- Branch: Royal Air Force
- Type: Command
- Role: Control of RAF Forces in Iraq

Iraq Command was the Royal Air Force (RAF) commanded inter-service command in charge of British forces in Iraq in the 1920s and early 1930s, during the period of the British Mandate of Mesopotamia. It continued as British Forces in Iraq until 1941 when it was replaced by AHQ Iraq. It consisted of Royal Air Force, Royal Navy, British Army, Commonwealth and locally raised units, commanded by an RAF officer normally of Air Vice-Marshal rank.

== Origins ==
Following the end of World War I and the accompanying British defence cuts, the new RAF took up the task of policing the Empire from the air. In May 1920 an insurgency broke out around the Euphrates and this uprising rapidly extended to a more general area. The Air Officer Commanding the Middle East dispatched an additional squadron from Egypt to Iraq. In London the Government were seeking a solution and the Army's proposal, which involved reinforcing Iraq with large numbers of personnel, was considered to be too expensive by the Cabinet. Winston Churchill, remembering the RAF's success in Somaliland asked Trenchard for a cheaper alternative and a plan for air control using air power as a more cost-effective way of controlling large areas than by using conventional land forces was proposed. In Mesopotamia there was a need to counter Turkish aspirations and by 1920 a Mesopotamian Wing had been established. In January 1921 Mesopotamian Group was formed by raising Mesopotamian Wing to group status.

In March 1921 at the Cairo Conference, Churchill, who was by then Colonial Secretary, along with the three service chiefs, decided that all British forces in Iraq would be put under control of the RAF. The intention was to apply the model of imperial air control which had worked in Somaliland to a much larger region which was similarly troubled. The following year, on 1 October 1922 Mesopotamian Group was absorbed into the newly formed Iraq Command which was given control of all British forces in Iraq.

== Locations ==
Air Headquarter initially situated in the Old British Residency in Baghdad. The Officers were accommodated in various messes in Baghdad and the airmen in a compound at Southgate. In December 1928 the Headquarters moved from Baghdad to RAF Hinaidi Cantonment and was located in one block of the original RAF General Hospital buildings. Apart from the Air Officer Commanding's staff mess, all the AHQ personnel were then accommodated at RAF Hinaidi. In 1937 Air Headquarters and the personnel moved from RAF Hinaidi Cantonment to the newly built RAF Dhibban (renamed RAF Habbaniya in 1938). The Air Officer Commanding then lived in Air House at Habbaniya.

== Actions ==
Iraq Command was responsible for the following military actions:

- 1920 to 1922 - The Great Iraqi Revolution of 1920 started in Baghdad in the summer of 1920 and dragged on until 1922.
- February to May 1923 - Following the anti-British activities of Sheikh Mahmud, delayed-action bombs were dropped outside Sulaymaniyah in an effort to get the Sheikh to adopt more pro-British policies. British land forces occupied Sulaymaniyah on 17 May and Sheikh Mahmud fled to Persia.
- March to April 1923 - In response to the uncovering of Turkish plans for an attack on Kurdistan, supported by local tribes associated with Sheikh Mahmud, Imperial troops and levies occupied Rowanduz and drove Turkish troops into nearby Persia.
- April 1923 - The RAF flew 280 Sikh troops from Kingarban to Kirkuk in the first British air trooping operation.
- 25 December 1923 - Sheikh Mahmud proclaimed himself King of Kurdistan; subsequently, the RAF bombed his house in Sulaymaniyah.
- December 1923 to January 1924 - The RAF bombed Akhwan raiders from Najd in an attempt to stop their attacks on the tribes living in southern Iraq.
- 4 May 1924 - Following a dispute between Assyrian levies and the Muslims living in Kirkuk, the levies ran amok. Air Vice-Marshal J F A Higgins had two platoons of the 1st Battalion the Royal Inniskilling Fusiliers airlifted from Hinaidi to Kirkuk to restore order.
- 5 May 1924 - The fusiliers were reinforced by air with two additional infantry platoons. No. 30 Squadron RAF carried out thorough air reconnaissance of the Kirkuk district.

The above section is incomplete.

== Follow-on ==
Since August 1921, Faisal I had been King of Iraq under the League of Nations Mandate. As of 1932, the mandate ended and the Hashemite Kingdom of Iraq was nominally independent. In accordance with the Anglo-Iraqi Treaty of 1930, British forces remained in Iraq.

In 1933 or 1934, "Iraq Command" was renamed the "British Forces in Iraq." By the late 1930s, these forces were restricted to two Royal Air Force stations, RAF Shaibah near Basrah, RAF Basrah (the supply depot on the Shatt-al-Arab at Basrah and RAF Habbaniya west of Baghdad. There were several Commanders of the "British Forces in Iraq". This command appears to have lasted until 1942. During the 1941 Anglo-Iraqi War, Iraqforce subsumed this command.

On 1 November 1941, "British Forces in Iraq" was renamed Air Headquarters Iraq (AHQ Iraq).

== Commanders ==
Commanders included:

=== Precursor formations ===
- 6 January 1921 (as Officer Commanding, HQ Mesopotamian Group) Group Captain A E Borton
- 13 October 1921 (as Officer Commanding, HQ Iraq Group) Group Captain, later Air Commodore, A E Borton

=== RAF Iraq Command ===
- 1 October 1922 Air Vice-Marshal J M Salmond
- 13 March 1924 Air Vice-Marshal J F A Higgins
- 3 November 1926 Air Vice-Marshal E L Ellington
- 1 November 1928 Air Vice-Marshal H R M Brooke-Popham
- 2 October 1930 Air Vice-Marshal E R Ludlow-Hewitt
- 1932 Air Commodore C L Courtney (temporary appointment)
- 23 November 1932 Air Vice-Marshal C S Burnett

=== British Forces in Iraq ===
- 1932 Air Vice-Marshal C S Burnett
- 1934 Air Vice Marshal W G S Mitchell
- 1937 Air Vice Marshal / Air Marshal (from 1939) C L Courtney
- 1937 Air Vice Marshall John Tyssen (from 20 November 1937)
- 1939 Air Vice Marshal H G Smart
- 1941 Air Vice Marshal J H. D'Albiac

== Chief staff officers ==
The following served as Chief Staff Officer (or Senior Air Staff Officer) at the headquarters of Iraq Command:

- 2 February 1923 Air Commodore L E O Charlton (resigned)
- 22 October 1923 Air Commodore J G Hearson
- 19 August 1924 Air Commodore H C T Dowding
- 24 April 1926 Air Commodore T C R Higgins
- 9 March 1928 Group Captain (later Air Commodore) F W Bowhill (as Senior Air Staff Officer)

list incomplete

== See also ==
- Ottoman Iraq
- British Mandate of Iraq
- Kingdom of Iraq
- Iraqi revolt against the British
- Iraqforce
- Persia and Iraq Command
- Iraq Levies
- List of Royal Air Force commands
