= Donald McInnes =

Donald McInnes or Donald MacInnes may refer to:

- Donald MacInnes (1824–1900), Ontarian politician
- Donald P. McInnes (1933–2015), Nova Scotian politician
- Donald McInnes (violist) (1939–2024), American musician

== See also ==
- Donald MacInnis (1918–2007), Nova Scotian politician
