= Guy Livingston (British Army officer) =

Brigadier-General Guy Livingston CMG
- Livingston in army uniform
- Born: 17 July 1881
- Died: 10 May 1950 (aged 68); Southwick, Sussex, England
- Military career
- Allegiance: United Kingdom
- Branch: British Army (1900–1918); Royal Air Force (1918–1919)
- Service years: c. 1900–1919
- Rank: Brigadier-General
- Conflicts: Second Boer War; First World War
- Awards: Companion of the Order of St Michael and St George; Commander of the Order of the Crown of Italy; Order of Saint Stanislaus, 2nd Class (Russia)

Brigadier-General Guy Livingston, CMG (17 July 1881 – 10 May 1950) was a British Army and Royal Air Force officer of the early 20th century. He was one of the small number of Royal Flying Corps generals in latter stages of the First World War, serving as the Chief Staff Officer at the RFC's Training Division and then as Director of Air Organisation. With the creation of the RAF on 1 April 1918, Livingston was appointed Deputy Master-General of Personnel at the Air Ministry. He remained in this post until late November 1918 when Brigadier-General Francis Festing took over.

Livingston's autobiography, Hot Air in Cold Blood, was published by Selwyn & Blount in 1933.

Military offices
| New title Training Division established | Chief Staff Officer, HQ Training Division RFC; August – October 1917 | Succeeded by John Hearson |
| Preceded by Lionel Charlton | Director of Air Organisation; October 1917 – February 1918 | Succeeded by Bertie Drew |
| New title RAF established | Deputy Master-General of Personnel; April – November 1918 | Succeeded by Francis Festing |
