= No. 16 Squadron RAF =

Flying squadron of the Royal Air Force

Coordinates: 53.02743°N 0.47773°W

- Squadron badge
- Active: 1915–1918 (RFC); 1918–1919; 1924–1957; 1958–1972; 1973–1984; 1984–1991; 1991–2005; 2008–present
- Country: United Kingdom
- Branch: Royal Air Force
- Type: Flying squadron
- Role: Elementary flying training
- Part of: No. 22 Group; No. 6 Flying Training School
- Station: RAF Wittering
- Nickname: 'The Saints'
- Mottos: Operta aperta (Latin for 'Hidden things are revealed')
- Aircraft: Grob Tutor T1

Insignia
- Roundel

Number 16 Squadron, nicknamed 'the Saints', is a flying squadron of the Royal Air Force (RAF) which provides elementary flying training and operates the Grob Tutor T1. It is based at RAF Wittering, Cambridgeshire, England.

The squadron formed as a part of Royal Flying Corps in 1915, at Saint-Omer, France, to carry out a mixture of offensive patrolling and reconnaissance, and was disbanded in 1919, shortly after the end of the First World War. The squadron reformed as part of the RAF in 1924, and again took on a reconnaissance role which it continued throughout the Second World War. Post-war, the squadron was disbanded and reformed several times, operating predominately in the bomber role. Equipped with the Tornado GR1 from 1984, the squadron took part in the Gulf War in the early 1990s. It was reformed in November 1991 as the operational conversion unit for the SEPECAT Jaguar, until the Jaguar's imminent withdrawal from service in 2005. No. 16 Squadron reformed again and took on its current role in 2008.

== History ==
=== First World War (1915–1919) ===
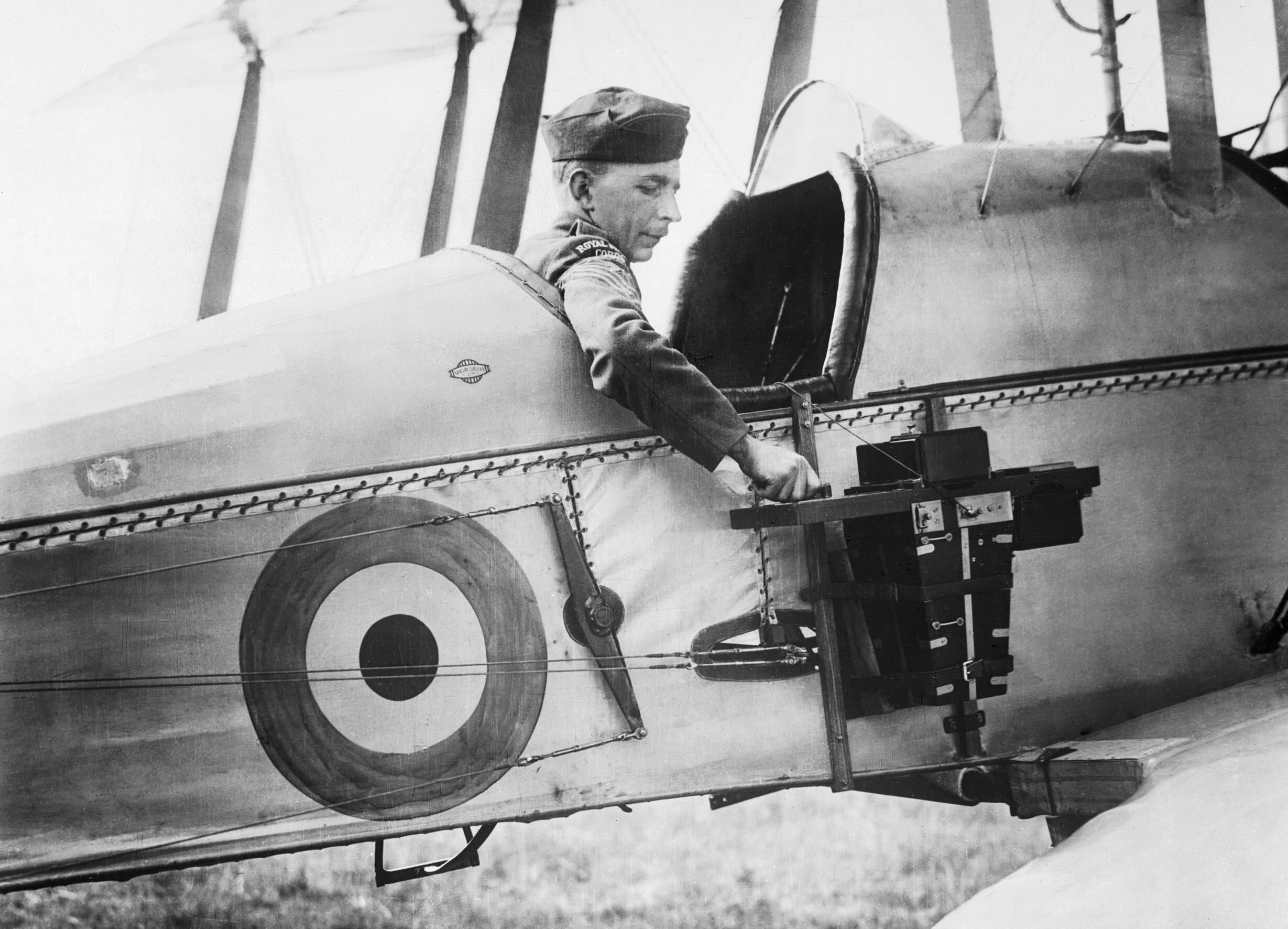
An observer of the Royal Flying Corps in a Royal Aircraft Factory B.E.2c reconnaissance aircraft demonstrates a C type aerial reconnaissance camera fixed to the side of the fuselage, 1916.

The squadron was formed at Saint-Omer, France on 10 February 1915, from flights split off from No. 2 Squadron and No. 6 Squadron of the Royal Flying Corps, which were replaced in their original squadrons by flights detached from No. 9 Squadron. These two flights were shortly (Note: On 26 February according to Jefford, and 1 March according to Jones.) joined by a third flight split from No. 5 Squadron, bringing the squadron to full strength. The squadron was initially commanded by Major Felton Holt, and was equipped with a mixture of aircraft types, including Farman MF.11s, Voisin IIIs, Royal Aircraft Factory B.E.2s and examples of the Vickers F.B.5 and Bleriot XI. As the squadron was formed from already experienced aircrew, it did not require additional training and workup, and was quickly able to begin operations, flying its first reconnaissance flight on 26 February. The squadron joined the Third Wing RFC on 1 March but transferred to the First Wing the next day. It moved to the aerodrome at the Beaupré-sur-la-Lys Abbey in La Gorgue in early March 1915. At the Battles of Aubers and Festubert in May 1915, radio-equipped aircraft of the squadron carried out contact patrols, where they would report back the progress of the advance to headquarters. This was the first employment of this tactic by the RFC.

On 1 June 1915, the squadron moved to Chocques in Pas-de-Calais, and moved again to Merville, Nord on 18 July. In July that year command passed to Major Hugh Dowding, who later commanded RAF Fighter Command during the Battle of Britain. During the Battle of Loos, the majority of the squadron was employed on directing artillery fire, with one flight carrying out tactical reconnaissance over the battlefield. The squadron returned to La Gorgue in December 1915. By early 1916, the squadron's equipment had been consolidated to the B.E.2c, supplemented by a few Bristol Scouts, with the squadron continuing to carry out tactical reconnaissance, artillery spotting and photography for the remainder of the war.

In June 1916, the squadron carried out reconnaissance missions during the Battle of Mont Sorrel. July 1916 bought the Battle of the Somme. While the squadron remained in the north of France, away from the Somme theatre, the squadron (Note: By July 1916, the squadron was part of the Second Wing RFC. It had returned to the First Wing by September that year.) supported local attacks, such as the Attack at Fromelles on 19 July. The squadron also carried out bombing operations against German communications (in particular against rail targets) for the duration of the Battle of the Somme. It moved to Bruay-la-Buissière on 31 August 1916.

In 1917, the squadron size increased from 18 to 24 aircraft in preparation for the planned spring offensive. A German bombing raid on Bruay on 11 January destroyed four 16 Squadron aircraft and wounded three men. The squadron was assigned to support the Canadian Corps during the Battle of Arras, in April–May 1917, particularly during the Battle of Vimy Ridge. The squadron re-equipped with the Royal Aircraft Factory R.E.8 in May 1917, and moved to Camblain-l'Abbé on 25 May that year. In August 1917, the squadron again supported the Canadian Corps during the Battle of Hill 70 near Lens, Pas-de-Calais, an attack which had the aim of preventing the Germans transferring troops to the Ypres front during the Battle of Passchendaele.

In March 1918, during Operation Michael, the opening part of the German spring offensive of 1918, 16 Squadron carried out night bombing operations, using parachute flares to illuminate their targets, and on 25 March, at a crucial part of the battle, the squadron was deployed on daylight attacks against the advancing German forces. On 1 April 1918, with the formation of the Royal Air Force (RAF), the Squadron became No. 16 Squadron Royal Air Force. On 21 October 1918, the squadron moved to La Brayelle Airfield, and on 25 October, it moved again, to Auchy. After the end of the war, the RAF's strength was quickly reduced, and in January 1919, 16 Squadron discarded its aircraft, before returning to England as a cadre on 12 February, moving to Fowlmere before disbanding on 31 December 1919.

In September 1915, flying-ace Duncan Grinnell-Milne joined the squadron as a junior pilot, and later (1933) published an account of his time in the squadron. His portrait of Dowding (who when the book was originally published had not then attained his later fame) is unflattering.

=== Between the wars (1924–1939) ===
The squadron was reformed at Old Sarum in Wiltshire in the army-cooperation role on 1 April 1924, equipped with the Bristol F.2 Fighter. The squadron had a strength of up to 32 aircraft, and was attached to the School of Army Co-operation, which was also based at Old Sarum. Duties included training of crews for operation army co-operation squadrons, as well as the development of techniques to allow the air force and army to work together, and the evaluation of new types for the army co-operation role, with the squadron's aircraft taking part in numerous exercises with the army. It re-equipped with the Armstrong Whitworth Atlas in January 1931, and again in December 1933 when its Atlases were replaced by the Hawker Audax.

=== Second World War (1939–1945) ===
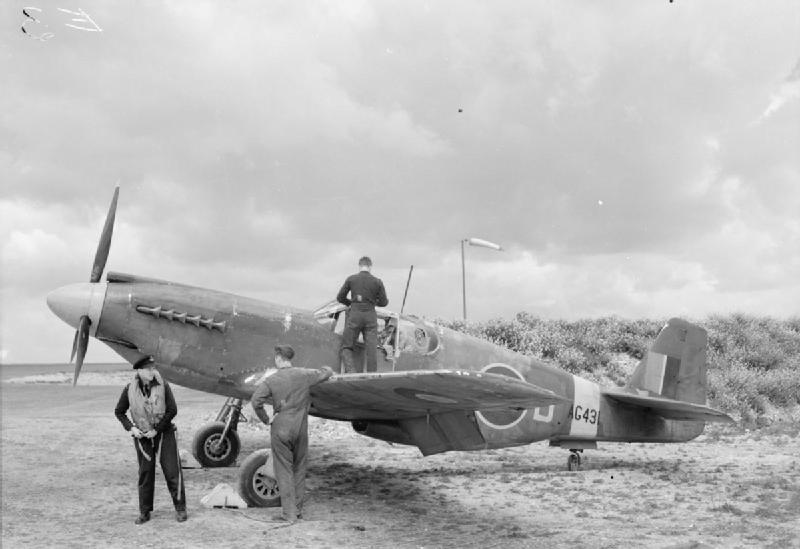
A North American Mustang Mk.I serving with 16 Squadron preparing for a mission

In May 1938, the squadron re-equipped with the Westland Lysander, and it continued in its tactical role in wartime France from April 1940. In May 1940, it returned to England and conducted roving sea patrols searching for both downed aircrew and enemy forces.

From April 1942, No. 16 Squadron re-equipped with the Allison-engined North American Mustang I. It carried out fighter sweeps and reconnaissance duties over France from its base at RAF Weston Zoyland in Somerset. The Supermarine Spitfire Mk.V took over this role from September 1943. On 2 June 1943, the squadron became part of the Strategic Reconnaissance Wing of the 2nd Tactical Air Force as a high-altitude photo reconnaissance unit, equipped with the Spitfire PR Mk.IX based at Hartford Bridge. In the build-up to D Day, the squadron supplied photographs instrumental to the planning of the Allied landings.

=== Cold War (1946–1991) ===
No. 16 Squadron was disbanded at RAF Celle in Germany on 1 April 1946, but reformed at RAF Fassberg (also in Germany) the same day, and re-equipped the 24-cylinder H-engined Hawker Tempest Mk.V, until converting to the radial-engined Mk.II on 7 June 1946. On 7 December 1948, the squadron took delivery of its first jet engined aircraft, the de Havilland Vampire FB.5, which subsequently gave way to the de Havilland Venom FB.1 in November 1954 until disbandment at Celle once more on 1 June 1957.

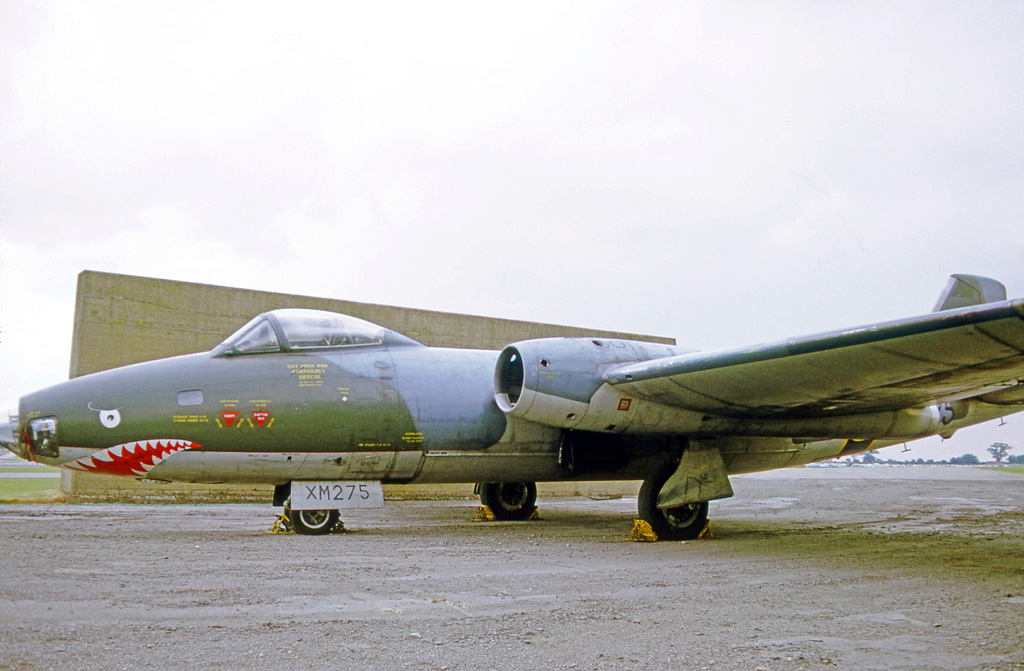
A No. 16 Squadron English Electric Canberra B(I)8, with shark mouth nose art, 1972

The Squadron reformed at RAF Laarbruch in West Germany on 1 March 1958, equipped with the English Electric Canberra B(I).8, as the last of four Canberra-equipped strike squadrons in RAF Germany. The principal role of the four squadrons was nuclear strike using US-owned Mark 7 nuclear bombs operated under a dual-key arrangement under Project E, with the Canberras using the Toss bombing technique to deliver the bomb on its target while escaping the bomb blast. Each of the four squadrons maintained a single nuclear-armed Canberra at 15 minutes readiness, but during the Cuban Missile Crisis in 1962, the requirement was increased to two armed Canberras held at readiness per squadron, and this regime remained in place after the crisis passed. In mid-1966, the Mark 7 bombs were replaced by US-owned B43 nuclear bombs that had previously been assigned to the RAF's recently-retired Vickers Valiant bombers, which allowed the use of the low-level Laydown delivery, which increased accuracy and reduced risks to the bomber.

The Canberra gave way to the Blackburn Buccaneer S.2B on 16 October 1972. The squadron's twelve Buccaneers were equipped with a variety of conventional weapons and eighteen British WE.177 nuclear bombs. Although Buccaneers could carry two WE.177 weapons, after taking into account attrition in the conventional phase of a high-intensity European war, and after withholding some aircraft in reserve, RAF planners expected that squadron strength remaining would still be sufficient to deliver the nuclear weapons stockpile. The Buccaneer distinguished itself in many bombing exercises; among its victories included the winning of the Salmond Trophy in 1978 and 1979.

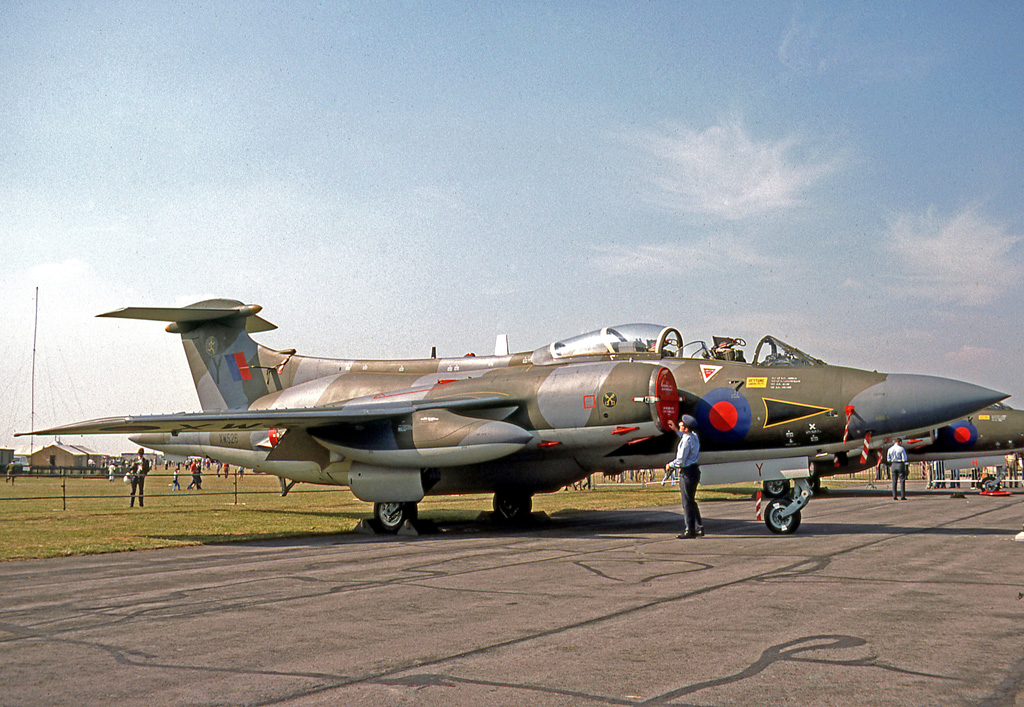
A Blackburn Buccaneer S.2B of No. 16 Squadron in 1977

The squadron briefly expanded in 1983 and 1984, absorbing some aircraft and personnel from its sister No. 15 Squadron which had converted to the Panavia Tornado GR1. No. 16 Squadron followed in late 1984 following the 'designate' process where a new No. 16 Squadron formed at RAF Honington in Suffolk, before moving to Laarbruch and assuming the squadron standard from the Buccaneer unit which had continued to operate throughout. Despite the change of aircraft, the squadron's role remained unchanged in countering a Soviet threat in Europe with conventional weapons and eighteen WE.177 nuclear bombs. As with the Buccaneer, there was a ratio of 1.5 weapons per aircraft.

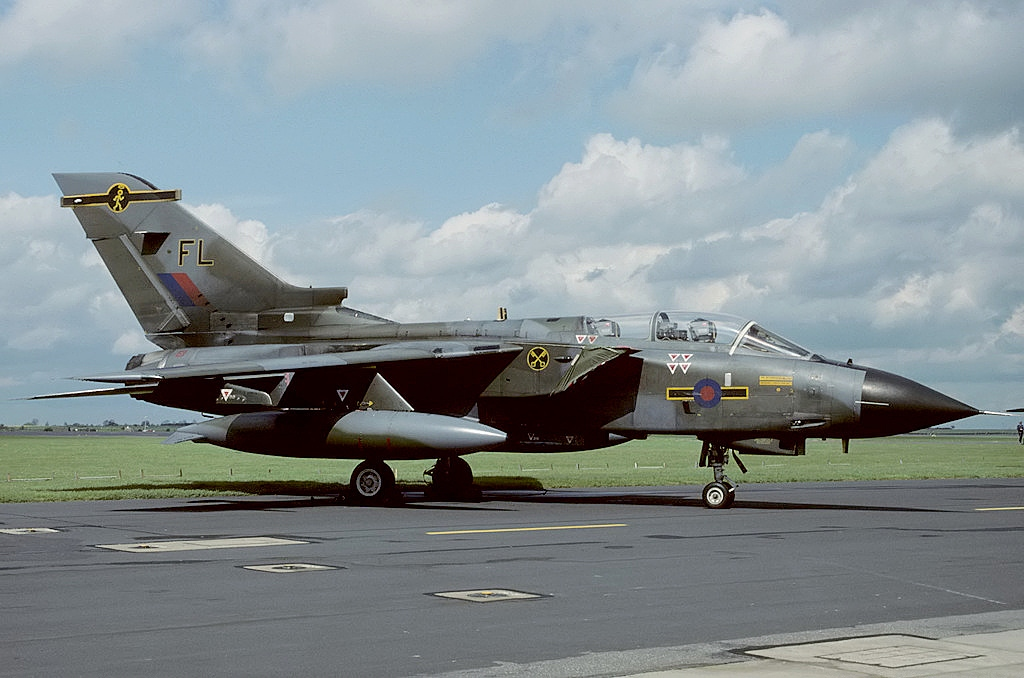
A Panavia Tornado GR1 of No. 16 Squadron in 1983, at the time based at RAF Laarbruch

Ahead of Operation Granby in 1990, the British military operation during the first Gulf War, No. 16 Squadron deployed to Tabuk Airbase in Saudi Arabia. It was the lead squadron in the deployment, with No. 20 Squadron and crews from other Tornado GR1 squadrons. The 'Tabuk Force' used JP233 submunition delivery system and 1,000 pounds (450 kilograms) bombs on low-level sorties against Iraqi airfields and other targets. Some of the squadron's aircraft later formed a flight that conducted accurate medium-level bombing using the Thermal Imaging Airborne Laser Designator (TIALD) pod.

Following hostilities, the squadron disbanded on 11 September 1991.

=== SEPECAT Jaguar (1991–2005) ===
On 1 November 1991, the squadron reformed at RAF Lossiemouth in Moray, as No. 16 (Reserve) Squadron, an operational conversion unit (OCU), replacing and taking over the aircraft and weapons of No. 226 OCU, training and converting new pilots for the SEPECAT Jaguar. Although no longer a front-line operational squadron, as a reserve, or shadow squadron, its twelve aircraft were equipped with conventional weapons and eight WE.177 nuclear weapons for use in a high-intensity European war, and it remained assigned to Supreme Allied Commander Europe for that purpose.

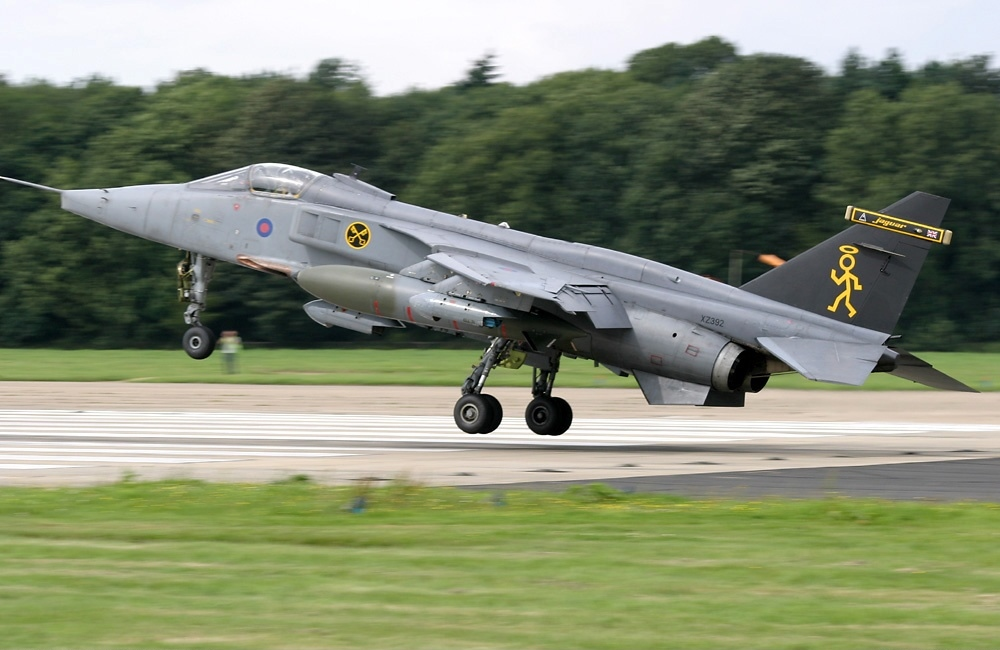
A No. 16 Squadron SEPECAT Jaguar GR3A displaying the squadron's saint logo on its tail in 2004

Although a non-operational squadron, its pilots were still involved in Operation Deny Flight in Bosnia and Herzegovina and Operation Northern Watch in Iraq. The squadron moved to RAF Coltishall in Norfolk, on 21 July 2000, joining numbers No. 6 Squadron, No. 41 Squadron, & No. 54 Squadron, consolidating the RAF's Jaguar fleet at one location.

In December 2003, the Ministry of Defence announced with the Delivering Security in a Changing World defence review, RAF Coltishall would close in 2007, and the recently upgraded Jaguar fleet would be retired early. This led to the disbandment of No. 16 Squadron on 11 March 2005 as the Jaguar approached retirement. The squadron standard was laid up in Notre-Dame Cathedral Saint-Omer, France on 20 March 2005.

=== Elementary flying training (2008–present) ===
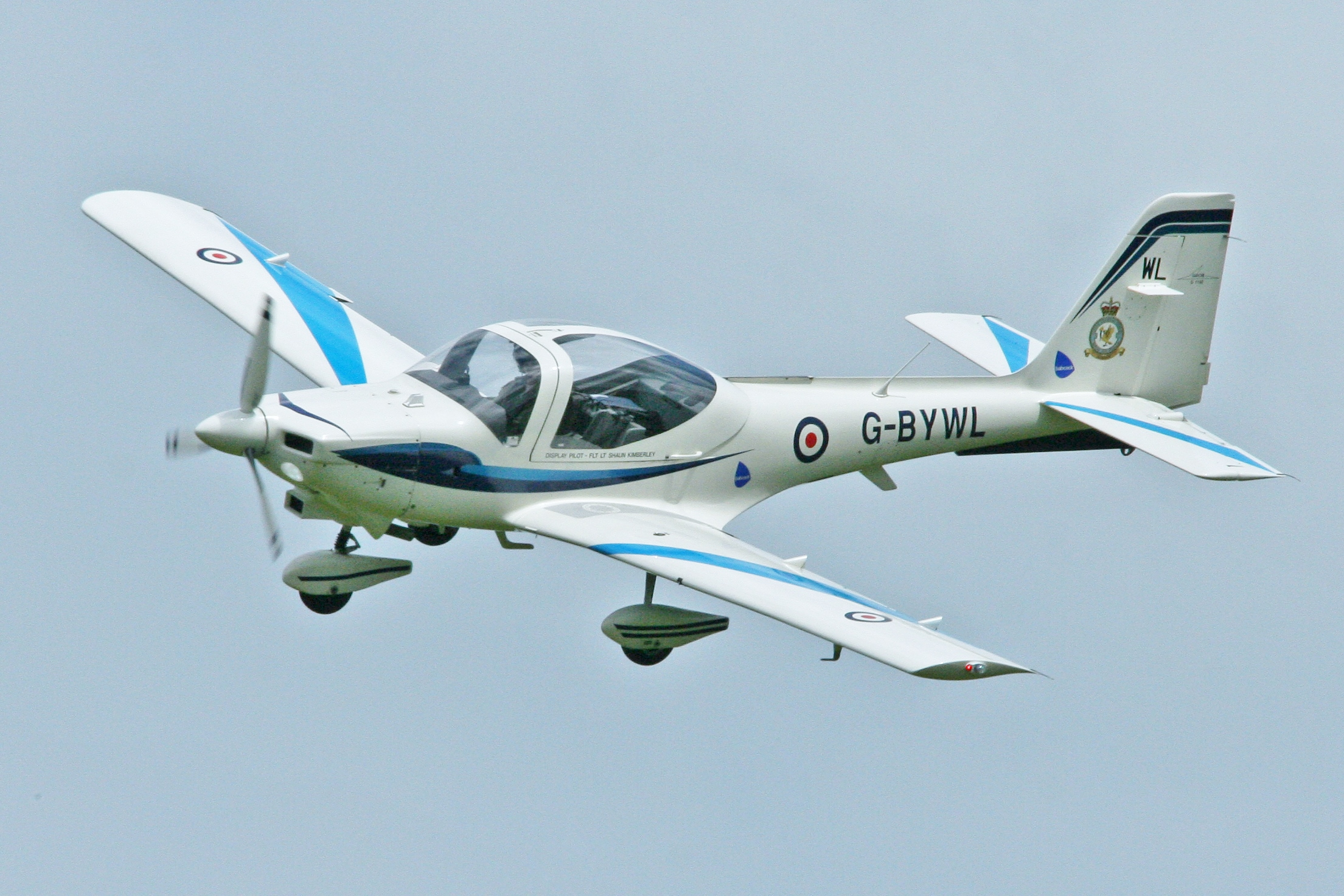
A Grob Tutor T1 which the squadron has operated since 2008

On 1 October 2008, the squadron was reformed at RAF Cranwell, Lincolnshire, as part of No. 22 Group, operating the Grob Tutor T1. No. 16(R) Squadron continues its training role by instructing new RAF pilots in elementary flying training (EFT) as part of No.1 Elementary Flying Training School (1 EFTS). From 2005 to 2008, the unit was known as 1 Squadron, 1 EFTS following a restructuring of the RAF's pilot training.

In the first half of 2015, No. 16 (R) Squadron, along with No. 115 (R) Squadron relocated to RAF Wittering, Cambridgeshire, which saw flying return to the base for the first time since 2010. The squadron offers courses of up to 70 hours, where students are taught basic aircraft handling, instrument flying, navigation, and formation flying before graduating to the fast-jet, multi-engine and rotary training squadrons for advanced flying training.

== Aircraft operated ==
- Royal Aircraft Factory R.E.5 (February 1915–March 1915)
- Vickers F.B.5 (February 1915–March 1915)
- Blériot XI (February 1915–March 1915)
- Martinsyde S.1 (February 1915–May 1915)
- Voisin III (March 1915–May 1915)
- Royal Aircraft Factory B.E.2c (March 1915– May 1917)
- Farman Aviation Works S.11 (May 1915– November 1917)
- Royal Aircraft Factory R.E.8 (March 1915–December 1919)
- Bristol F.2 Fighter (1924–1931)
- Armstrong Whitworth Atlas (1931–1934)
- Hawker Audax (1934–1938)
- Westland Lysander (1938–1942)
- North American Mustang (1942–1944)
- Supermarine Spitfire Mk.XI (1944–1946)
- Hawker Tempest Mk. II and Mk. V (1946–1948)
- de Havilland Vampire FB.5 (1948–1954)
- de Havilland Venom FB.1 (1954–1957)
- English Electric Canberra B(I).8 (1958–1972)
- Blackburn Buccaneer S.2B (1972–1984)
- Panavia Tornado GR1 (1984–1991)
- SEPECAT Jaguar GR1, GR3, T2, and T4 (1991–2005)
- Grob Tutor T1 (2008 – present)

== Heritage ==
=== Badge and motto ===
The squadron's heraldic badge features a two keys in saltire and was approved by King Edward VIII in November 1936. The badge symbolises army co-operation duties, with the keys indicating the unlocking of the enemy's secrets; the gold key by day, the black key by night.

The squadron's motto is Operta aperta (Latin for 'Hidden things are revealed'), a reference to the reconnaissance role of the squadron in its early days.

=== Nickname ===
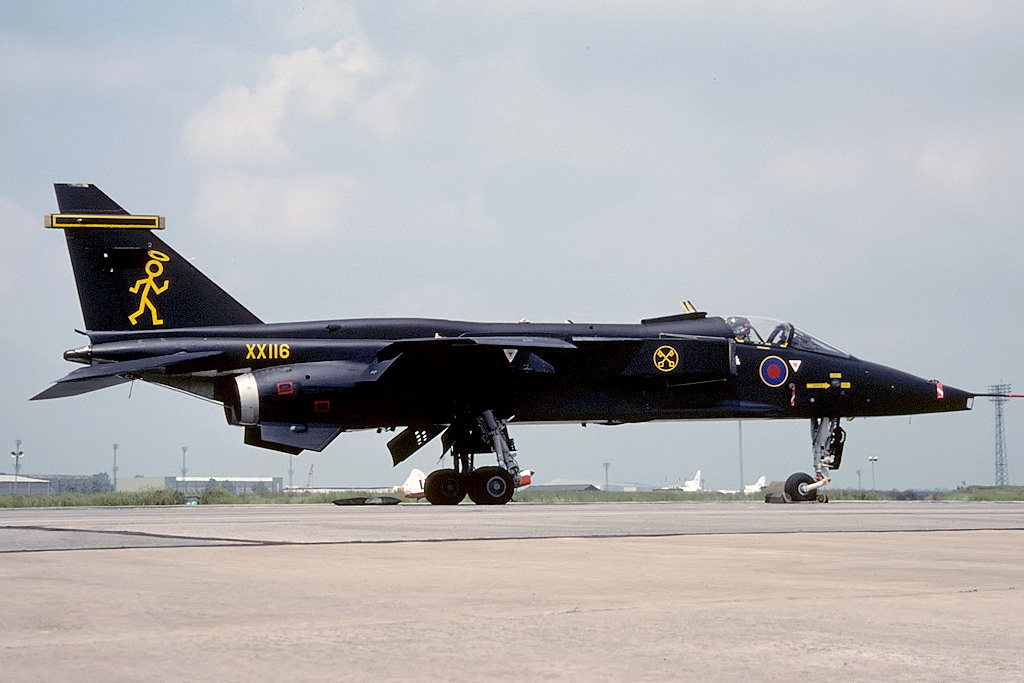
A SEPECAT Jaguar GR1A of No. 16 (R) Squadron in commemorative livery, displaying 'The Saint' on its tail, 1995

The squadron's nickname is 'The Saints', which reflects that the squadron was formed at Saint-Omer in northern France.

== Battle honours ==
No. 16 Squadron has received the following battle honours. Those marked with an asterisk (*) may be emblazoned on the squadron standard.

- Western Front (1915–1918)
- Neuve Chappelle (1915)
- Loos (1915)
- Somme (1916)*
- Arras (1917)*
- Ypres (1917)*
- France and Low Countries (1939–1940)
- Dunkirk (1940)*
- Fortress Europe (1941–1944)
- France and Germany (1944–1945)
- Normandy (1944)*
- Arnhem (1944)*
- Ruhr (1942–1945)
- Gulf (1991)

== Notable commanders ==
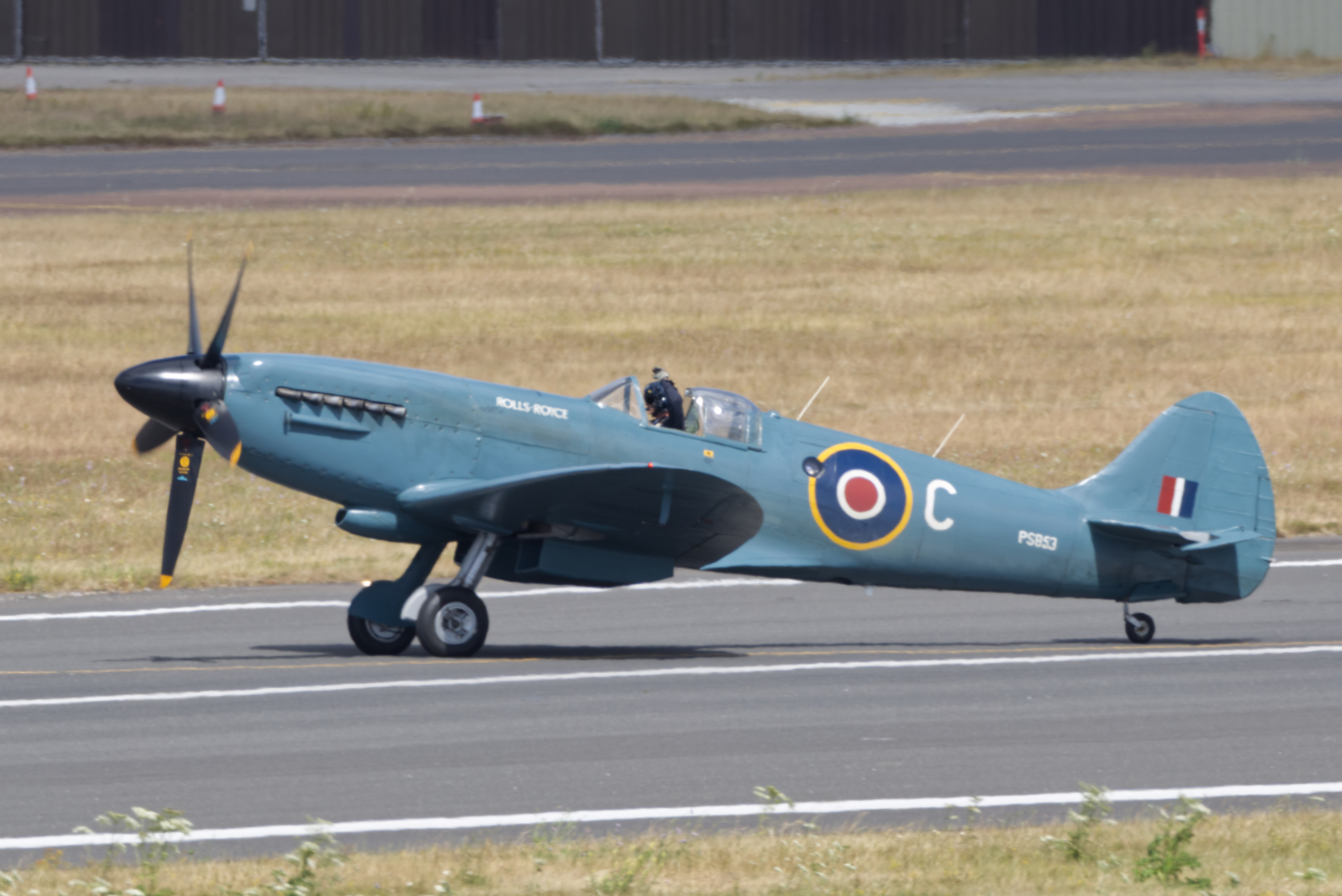
- Preserved Spitfire PR XIX painted in the colours of No. 16 Squadron, 2022
  The squadron's first commander was Major Felton Holt of the Royal Flying Corps who led the squadron between 8 February 1915 and 23 July 1915. He became a brigadier general in the newly established RAF just before the end of the First World War. During the inter-war years, Holt remained in the RAF, serving in several staff appointments before becoming Air Officer Commanding Fighting Area.
- Major Hugh Dowding led the squadron between 23 July 1915 and January 1916. During the Battle of Britain, Dowding was Officer Commanding RAF Fighter Command and is generally credited with playing a crucial role in Britain's defence, and hence, the defeat of Operation Sea Lion, Adolf Hitler's plan to invade Britain.
- Major Paul Maltby was in command between 5 August 1916 and 1917. He achieved the rank of Air Vice Marshal and later served as the Serjeant at Arms in the House of Lords.
- From June 1917 to 1918 Major Charles Portal led the squadron. He became Chief of the Air Staff during the Second World War and later chairman of the British Aircraft Corporation in 1960.
- Squadron Leader Alec Coryton commanded the squadron from 30 Sep 1925 to 7 Nov 1928. He went on to achieve the rank of Air Marshal and held several positions in the Ministry of Supply later in his career.

== See also ==
- List of Royal Air Force aircraft squadrons

== Bibliography ==
- Ashworth, Chris (1989). Encyclopedia of Modern Royal Air Force Squadrons. Wellingborough, UK: Patrick Stephens Limited. ISBN 1-85260-013-6.
- Brookes, Andrew (2014). RAF Canberra Units of the Cold War. Osprey Combat Aircraft. Vol. 105. Oxford: Osprey Publishing. ISBN 978-1-78200-411-0.
- Bruce, J. M. (1998). Bristol Fighter: A Windsock Database Special: Volume 2. Berkhamstead, UK: Albatros Productions Ltd.
- Halley, James J. (1988). The Squadrons of the Royal Air Force & Commonwealth 1918–1988. Tonbridge, UK: Air Britain (Historians) Ltd. ISBN 0-85130-164-9.
- Jefford, C. G. (1994). RAF Squadrons: A Comprehensive Record of the Movement and Equipment of all RAF Squadrons and their Antecedents since 1912. Shrewsbury, UK: Airlife Publishing Ltd. ISBN 1-85310-053-6.
- Jones, H. A. (1928). The War in the Air: Being the Story of the part played in the Great War by the Royal Air Force: Vol. II. History of the Great War. Oxford: The Clarenden Press. OCLC 924164573.
- Jones, H. A. (1931). The War in the Air: Being the Story of the part played in the Great War by the Royal Air Force: Vol. III. History of the Great War. Oxford: The Clarendon Press. OCLC 831226907.
- Jones, H. A. (1934). The War in the Air: Being the Story of the part played in the Great War by the Royal Air Force: Vol. IV. History of the Great War. Oxford: The Clarendon Press. OCLC 836194155.
- Lake, Alan (1999). Flying Units of the RAF: The ancestry, formation and disbandment of all flying units from 1912. Shrewsbury, UK: Airlife Publishing Ltd. ISBN 1-84037-086-6.
- Lake, Jon (August 2006). "EE Canberra in RAF Service: Part One: The Bomber Years". Air International. Vol. 71, no. 2. pp. 38–43. ISSN 0306-5634.
- Lake, Jon (September 2006). "EE Canberra in RAF Service: Part Two". Air International. Vol. 71, no. 3. pp. 30–39. ISSN 0306-5634.
- Rawlings, John D. R. (1982). Coastal, Support and Special Squadrons of the RAF and their Aircraft. London: Jane's Publishing Company, Limited. ISBN 0-7106-0187-5.
- Sturtivant, Ray; Hamlin, John; Halley, James J. (1997). Royal Air Force Flying Training and Support Units. Tunbridge Wells, UK: Air Britain (Historians) Ltd. ISBN 0-85130-252-1.
- Taylor, Jimmy (May 2002). "Hidden things Revealed: No 16 Squadron's Contribution to Operation "Market Garden"". Aeroplane. Vol. 30, no. 5. pp. 24–30. ISSN 0143-7240.
