= Felton Holt =

Royal Air Force air vice marshal (1886–1931)

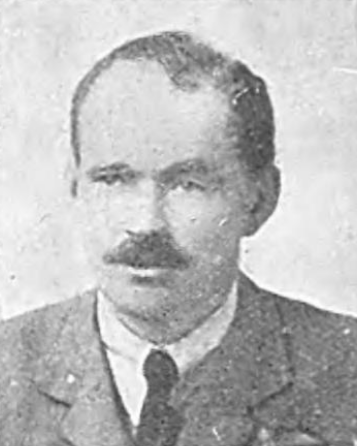
- Born: 23 February 1886; Westminster, London
- Died: 23 April 1931 (aged 45); Westhampnett, Sussex
- Military career
- Allegiance: United Kingdom
- Branch: British Army (1903–1918); Royal Air Force (1918–1931)
- Service years: 1903–1931
- Rank: Air Vice Marshal
- Commands: Fighting Area (1931); Central Flying School (1923–1925); 22nd Wing RFC (1917–1918); 16th Wing RFC (1916–1917); No. 25 Squadron RFC (1915–1916); No. 16 Squadron RFC (1915)
- Conflicts: First World War
- Awards: Companion of the Order of St Michael and St George; Distinguished Service Order; Mentioned in Despatches (2)

Air Vice Marshal Felton Vesey Holt, CMG, DSO (23 February 1886 – 23 April 1931) was a squadron and wing commander in the Royal Flying Corps who became a brigadier general in the newly established Royal Air Force (RAF) just before the end of the First World War. During the inter-war years Holt remained in the RAF, serving in several staff appointments before becoming Air Officer Commanding Fighting Area.

Holt was killed in a flying accident not long after taking up his final appointment. He was flying in a de Havilland DH.60M Moth from RAF Tangmere to take him back to RAF Uxbridge when it crashed at Seahurst Park near Chichester, following a collision with an Armstrong Whitworth Siskin. Holt managed to get out of the aircraft, but his parachute did not open in time.

Military offices
New title Squadron raised	Officer Commanding No. 16 Squadron; February – July 1915	Succeeded by Hugh Dowding
New title Wing established	Officer Commanding Home Defence Wing; June 1916 – February 1917	Succeeded by T C R Higgins
Preceded by Edward Masterman	Commandant of the Central Flying School; 1923–1925	Succeeded by Wilfrid Freeman
