= Robert Brooke-Popham =

Royal Air Force Air Chief Marshal (1878–1953)

Air Chief Marshal Sir Robert Brooke-Popham GCVO KCB CMG DSO AFC
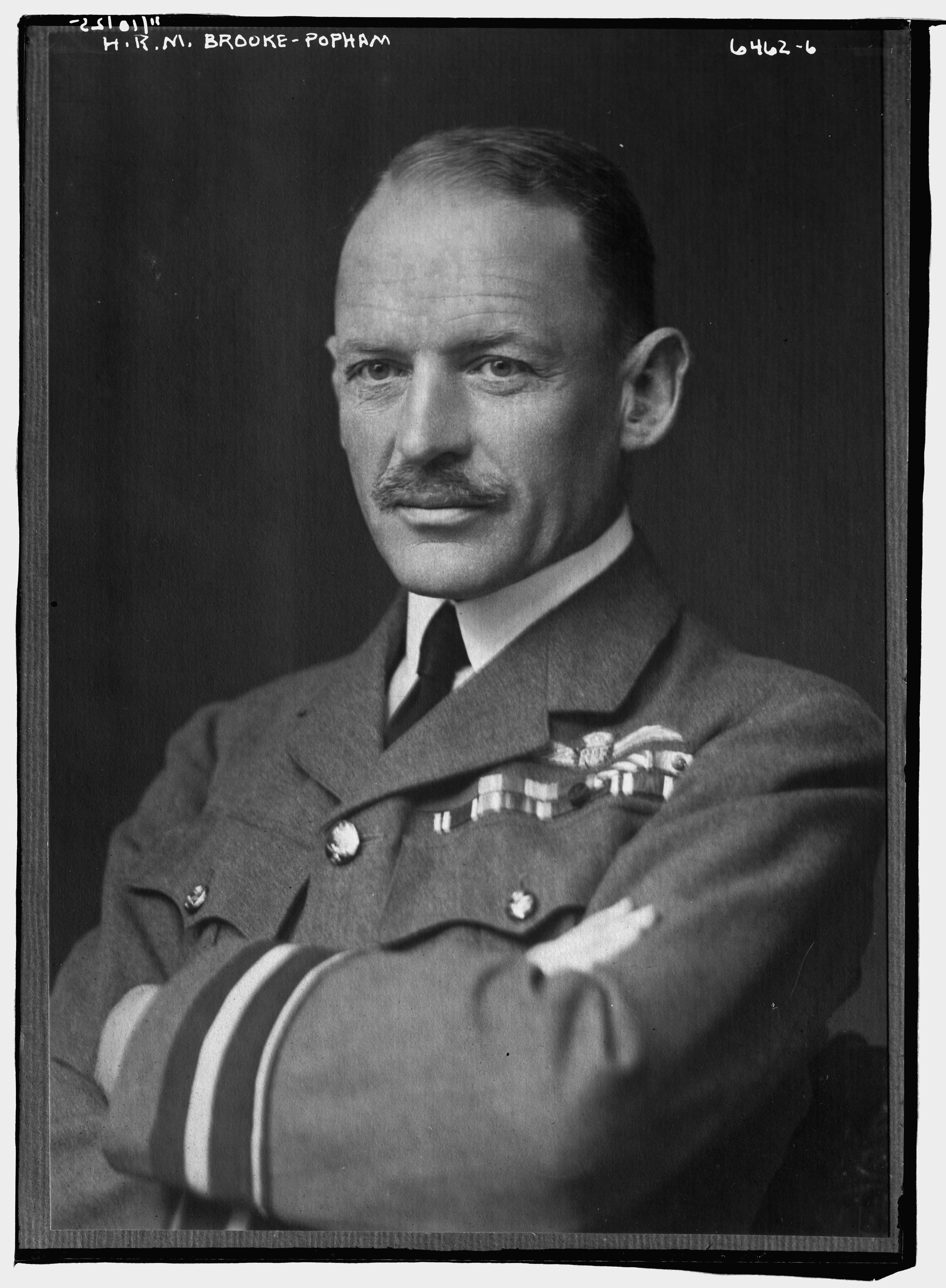
- Brooke-Popham in 1925
- Born: 18 September 1878; Mendlesham, Suffolk
- Died: 20 October 1953 (aged 75); RAF Halton, Buckinghamshire
- Military career
- Allegiance: United Kingdom
- Branch: British Army (1898–1918); Royal Air Force (1918–1942)
- Service years: c. 1898–1937; 1939–1942
- Rank: Air chief marshal
- Nickname: Brookham
- Commands: Far East Command (1940–1941); Inspector-General of the RAF (1935); Air Defence of Great Britain (1933–1935); Imperial Defence College (1931–1933); Iraq Command (1928–30); RAF Staff College, Andover (1922–1926); No. 3 Wing RFC (1914–1915); No. 3 Squadron RFC (1912–1914)
- Conflicts: Second Boer War; First World War; Second World War
- Awards: Knight Grand Cross of the Royal Victorian Order; Knight Commander of the Order of the Bath; Companion of the Order of St Michael and St George; Distinguished Service Order; Air Force Cross; Mentioned in Despatches (4); Officer of the Legion of Honour (France); Order of Saint Stanislaus, 2nd Class (Russia)

Air Chief Marshal Sir Henry Robert Moore Brooke-Popham, GCVO, KCB, CMG, DSO, AFC (18 September 1878 – 20 October 1953) was a senior commander in the Royal Air Force. During the First World War he served in the Royal Flying Corps as a wing commander and senior staff officer. Remaining in the new Royal Air Force (RAF) after the war, Brooke-Popham was the first commandant of its Staff College at Andover and later held high command in the Middle East. He was Governor of Kenya in the late 1930s. Most notably, Brooke-Popham was Commander-in-Chief of the British Far East Command until being replaced a few weeks before Singapore fell to Japanese troops.

== Family life and education ==
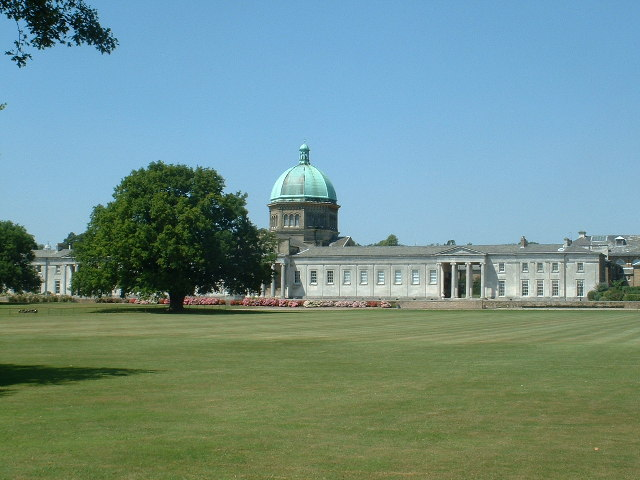
Haileybury College where Brooke-Popham was educated

Brooke-Popham was born in England in the Suffolk village of Mendlesham on 18 September 1878. His parents were Henry Brooke, a country gentleman of Wetheringsett Manor in Suffolk, and his wife Dulcibella who was the daughter of Robert Moore, a clergyman.

Brooke-Popham's education was not atypical of a man entering the British officer class. He attended South Lodge School in Lowestoft from 1885 to 1891. After his school years at Haileybury and his officer training at the Royal Military College, Sandhurst, he was commissioned into the British Army in 1898. In January 1926, Brooke-Popham married Opal Mary, the daughter of Edgar Hugonin. They later had a son and a daughter.

== Early military career ==
After graduating from Sandhurst in May 1898, Brooke-Popham was gazetted to the Oxfordshire Light Infantry in the rank of second lieutenant, and the following year promoted to lieutenant on 24 November 1899. As a subaltern he saw active service in the Second Boer War during 1899 and 1900 and on 26 April 1902 he was seconded for further duty in South Africa.

During his time there he served in the Orange Free State, the Transvaal, the Orange River Colony, and Cape Colony. He was promoted captain on 9 November 1904. By 1910 Brooke-Popham had returned to Great Britain. From 22 January 1910, he attended the Army Staff College at Camberley.

== Military aviation before the First World War ==
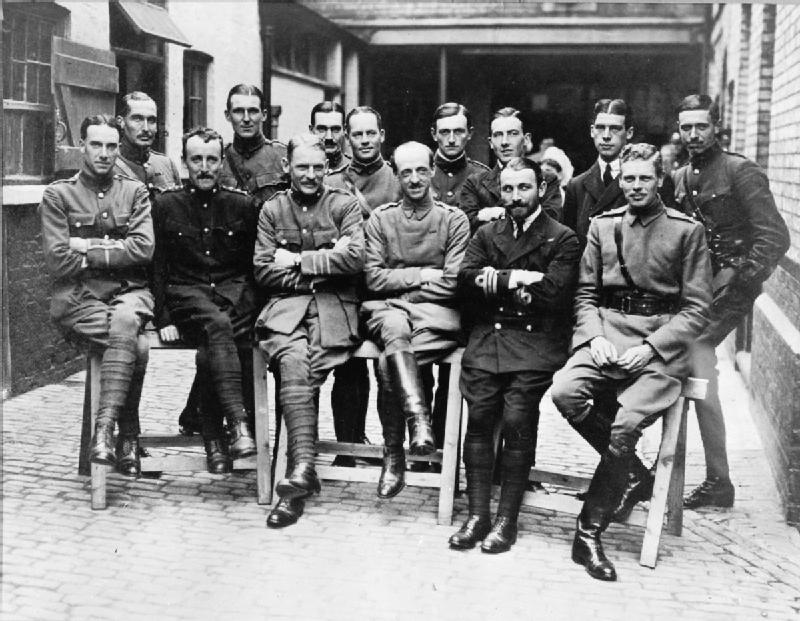
Brooke-Popham, front row third from left, with British military aviation pioneers

Brooke-Popham was attached to Air Battalion Royal Engineers during its manoeuvres of 1911, after which he decided to learn to fly. He attended the flying school at Brooklands and gained Royal Aero Club certificate number 108 in July 1911. He returned to his regiment, the Oxfordshire and Buckinghamshire Light Infantry, on 28 February 1912.

However, in early 1912, he transferred to the Air Battalion, taking up duties as a pilot in March. The next month, he was appointed Officer Commanding of the Battalion's Aeroplane Company.

With the creation of the Royal Flying Corps (RFC) from the Air Battalion on 13 May 1912, Brooke-Popham was transferred to the RFC. He was appointed the first Officer Commanding of No. 3 Squadron. In a letter to the editor of Flight magazine, dated 23 January 1949, he wrote, "I see from an old log book that though I was seconded to the Air Battalion at the end of March 1912, it was not till the 6th May that I flew to Larkhill to take over command of No.2 (Aeroplane) Co." No. 3 Squadron was the successor unit to the Air Battalion's No. 2 (Aeroplane) Company which had been stationed at Larkhill, on Salisbury Plain, since its creation in April 1911 and thus became the oldest British, Empire or Commonwealth independent military unit to operate heavier-than-air machines.

== First World War ==
Following the outbreak of the First World War, Brooke-Popham went to France as the Deputy Assistant Adjutant and Quartermaster-General in the headquarters of the Royal Flying Corps, where he was responsible for the administrative and technical support to the squadrons deployed in the field. His understanding of the importance of air power and its support to land forces led him to criticize the lack of adequate air support to the British Expeditionary Force (BEF).

On 20 November 1914 Brooke-Popham was appointed Officer Commanding No. 3 Wing of the RFC. At this time the wing consisted of No. 1 and No. 4 squadrons, and on the same day as his appointment, Brooke-Popham received a temporary promotion to lieutenant colonel.

During the Battle of Neuve Chapelle, Brooke-Popham directed his Wing's operations and was later awarded the Distinguished Service Order for his part in the Battle.

By 1915, Brooke-Popham was too senior an officer to take part in much operational flying, and he also had limited experience of air combat. Rather, his energies were directed into administrative and organizational activities, as he served in several staff posts at the RFC's headquarters in France. In May 1915 Brooke-Popham was appointed the RFC's Chief Staff Officer, and on 1 September was promoted to major. In March 1916 he was the Corps' Deputy Adjutant and Quartermaster-General, which saw him granted the temporary rank of brigadier general.

In 1915, the capabilities of radio were still very limited. Observers in aircraft could not easily communicate with men on the ground. Men on the ground could not easily reply. In 1915, a technique was developed whereby troops on the ground could send messages to aviators by laying strips of white cloth on the ground. These strips are referred to as "Popham strips" in a novel set in the period. He was awarded the Order of St Stanislas, 2nd Class, in 1916.

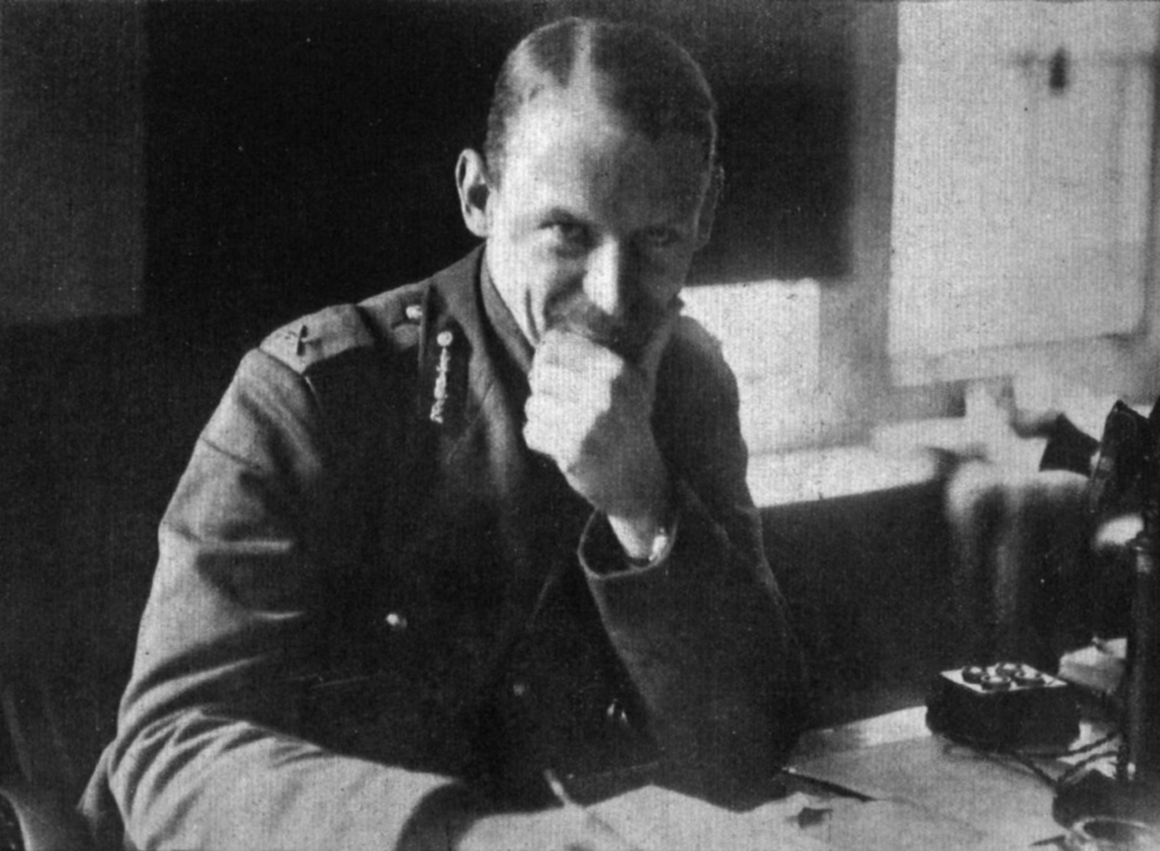
Brooke-Popham as Director of Aircraft Research in 1919

With the establishment of the Royal Air Force (RAF) in April 1918, Brooke-Popham, promoted on 3 June to brevet colonel, was transferred to the newly created Air Ministry in London. He served as the Controller of Aircraft Production for the remainder of the War and for some months afterwards. In 1919, he served as Director of Aircraft Research.

Developed during the First World War, the Popham panel was named for him.

== RAF service during the inter-war years ==
=== Post-war honours ===
Following the end of the First World War, Brooke-Popham was decorated for his contributions to the war effort. In January 1919 he was awarded the Air Force Cross and made a Companion of the Order of St Michael and St George. Later in the same year he was appointed a Companion of the Order of the Bath in the 1919 Birthday Honours and was given a permanent commission in the Royal Air Force as a colonel. He was rapidly promoted to air commodore when the Air Force introduced its own rank system in August 1919.

=== Career progression ===
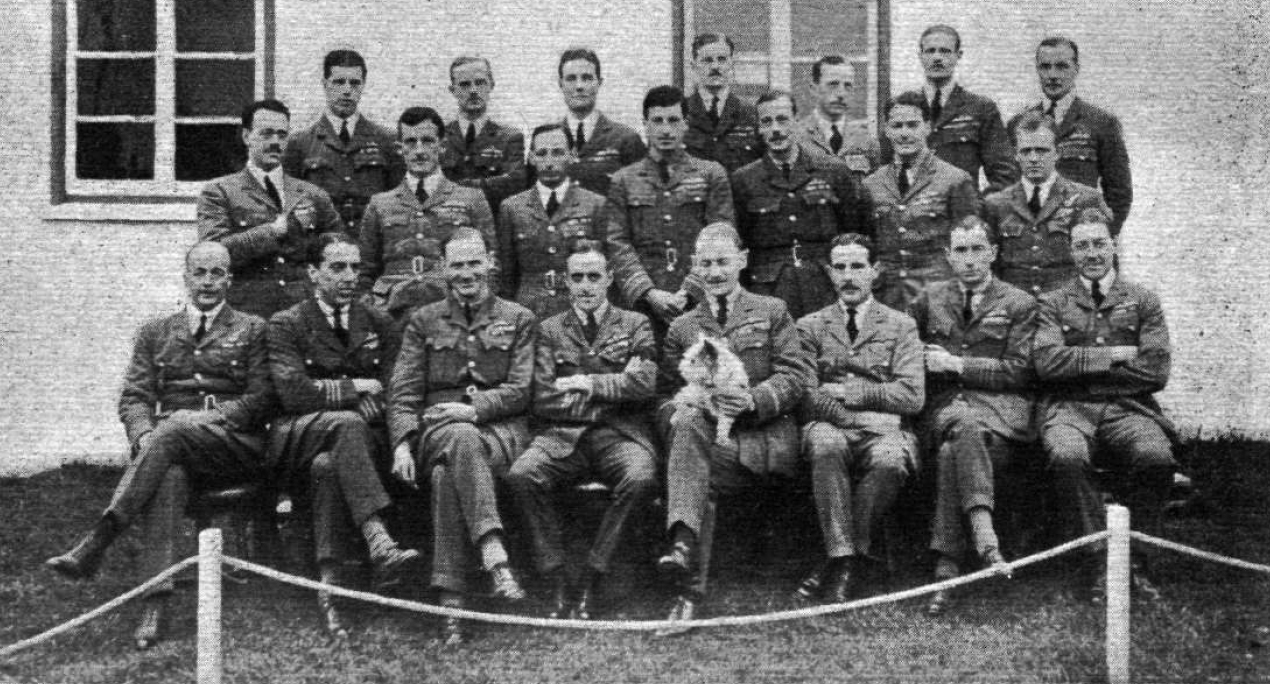
The first RAF Staff College course at Andover. Brooke-Popham (Commandant) is seated in the front and centre with dog on lap.

From 1919 to 1921, Brooke-Popham served as director of research at the Air Ministry and in November 1921 he was tasked with establishing the RAF Staff College at Andover and he became its first commandant on 1 April 1922.

In 1925 the Air Defence of Great Britain had been created and it was charged with defending the United Kingdom from aerial attack. The following year, Brooke-Popham was posted as Air Officer Commanding (AOC) the Fighting Area within the Air Defence of Great Britain and he served in this capacity for the next two years. During his time as AOC Fighting Area, Brooke-Popham oversaw the establishment of a chain of huge concrete mirrors which were designed for acoustic early warning and was promoted to Knight Commander of the Order of the Bath (KCB) in the 1927 Birthday Honours.

On 1 November 1928, Brooke-Popham was appointed AOC Iraq Command. This high-profile position put him in charge of all British forces in Iraq and, when the post of high commissioner was vacant, he acted in that capacity as well. In late 1928, he mobilised and despatched the Victoria aircraft for the rescue of British embassy staff and others in the Kabul evacuation by air operation.

The start of 1931 saw Brooke-Popham promoted to air marshal and then posted as the first RAF officer to serve as Commandant of the Imperial Defence College. Two years later in 1933, he returned to the Air Defence of Great Britain, this time in the senior post of Air Officer Commander-in-Chief. Later that year Brooke-Popham received the honorary appointment of Principal Aide-de-Camp to the King. In 1935 he left the Air Defence of Great Britain to become the Inspector-General of the RAF. This was, however, a short-lived appointment and he was posted later that year.

=== Commander-in-Chief RAF Middle East ===
In late 1935, Brooke-Popham took up the post of Air Officer Commander-in-Chief RAF Middle East with his headquarters in Cairo. His appointment took place not long after the outbreak of the Second Italo-Abyssinian War in October 1935 and his principal aim was to deter the Regia Aeronautica from attacking British territory in north east Africa. In 1937, Brooke-Popham relinquished his command and returned to Great Britain, retiring from the RAF on 6 March.

== Private life ==
In Q2 1926 in Tadcaster, he married Opal Mary Hugonin (16 Oct 1900 – Q2 1983).

They had two children, Diana M in Q4 1926 in Marylebone and Francis P in Q3 1928 in Uxbridge.

In Q1 1948 in Westminster Diana married Robert H H Barton, and they had Margaret H, born Q4 1948 in Ploughley, Francis C H born Q3 1951 in Halstead, and Joanna M H , born Q4 1953 in Oxford.

In Q1 1957 in Greenwich, Francis married Susan C Fry; they had three daughters, Jane E in Q1 1960 in Gosport, Catherine A in Q1 1962 in Portsmouth and MARY L in Q3 1964 in Islington. In 1986 in Taunton, he married Diana J Michael.

== Governor of Kenya ==
Following Italy's occupation of Ethiopia, the British Government wanted a military man to hold the post of Governor of Kenya. Brooke-Popham was appointed Governor and Commander-in-Chief of Kenya in 1937 and his military expertise was useful in helping the colony prepare for a possible war with Italy. Under his direction, a plan was devised which concentrated defensive resources on the strategically important port of Mombasa, which was judged to be the most likely Italian target. Although this left Nairobi and the highlands with only limited defences, the barren regions of northern Kenya meant that the inland settlements were geographically protected from the Italian threat further to the north. Eventually, as the Italian occupation of Ethiopia was characterized by strife and unrest, the threat to Kenya dissipated.

Brooke-Popham's governorship was also marked by improved relations with the settlers. His predecessor had sought to dominate the political and economic life of the colony which had aroused repeated opposition from some of the settlers' leaders. However, in courting settler opinion, some historians have criticized Brooke-Popham for failing to deal with those settlers who wanted to limit African and Asian freedoms in Kenya.

In 1939 on the outbreak of the Second World War, Brooke-Popham ordered the internment of all Germans in Kenya, directed that all aircraft be commandeered, and devised a plan to keep the colony's farms running. On 30 September 1939 he relinquished the governorship and returned to Britain.

== Second World War ==
=== Commonwealth Air Training Plan ===
Brooke-Popham rejoined the RAF shortly after his return to Great Britain and only weeks after the outbreak of the Second World War. He was first appointed as head of the RAF's training mission to Canada where he worked on the establishment of the Commonwealth Air Training Plan. In 1940 Brooke-Popham was made head of the training mission to South Africa where he continued work on the Plan.

=== Commander-in-Chief Far East Command ===
==== Command arrangements ====
On 18 November 1940, at the age of 62, Brooke-Popham was appointed Commander-in-Chief of the British Far East Command making him responsible for defence matters in Singapore, Malaya, Burma and Hong Kong. This was a considerably more demanding undertaking than any of Brooke-Popham's many previous appointments. The Command was new and Brooke-Popham was the first RAF officer to be appointed Commander-in-Chief of a joint command during a world war.

There was a significant gap between the Commander-in-Chief's responsibility and his authority, as Brooke-Popham was nominally responsible for all defence matters in the British Far East colonies but the Royal Navy units in these waters did not come under his command; rather they reported to their own naval commander-in-chief in London. The civil servants in the Far East also did not report to the Commander-in-Chief, working instead for ministers in London.

==== Insufficient defences ====
With the Japanese threatening south-east Asia, Brooke-Popham knew he had to build up the defences of the region. Those defences which already existed were primarily directed towards an attack from the sea and everywhere sufficient forces were lacking. The Command's aerial defences were particularly deficient and the priority attached to operations in the Middle East meant that British resources were directed elsewhere. During the following year, Brooke-Popham struggled without much success to build up defences, get the much-needed reinforcements and rectify the unsound command arrangements.

==== Operation Matador ====
In August 1941 Brooke-Popham submitted a plan for the defence of Malaya to London for approval. This plan, code-named Matador, worked on the basis that the Japanese would land on the east coast of Thailand and then advance south. The essence of Operation Matador was that Allied forces would advance into Thailand and fight the Japanese there. The plan relied upon force levels not available to Brooke-Popham and involved violating the neutrality of Thailand, with whom a non-aggression pact had been signed the previous year. Concern regarding the situation prompted the government in London to send Duff Cooper as a special cabinet envoy. Cooper's arrival in September 1941, did not help to maintain Brooke-Popham's authority in a difficult situation.

On 22 November, with the Japanese establishing sea and air bases in southern Indo-China, Brooke-Popham urged London that Matador should be put into effect, granting him permission to advance into southern Thailand. Brooke-Popham did eventually receive permission on 5 December although many conditions were attached. The plan was reworked to take account of the limited forces available and on 8 December the war with Japan began. Two days before the Malayan Campaign began, Hudsons of No.1 Squadron (RAAF) spotted the Japanese invasion fleet but given uncertainty about the ships' destination and instructions to avoid offensive operations until attacks were made against friendly territory, Brooke-Popham did not allow the convoy to be bombed.

Although it had been agreed in London that Brooke-Popham should be replaced as commander-in-chief on 1 November 1941, the change was not made because of the critical situation. With the war with Japan now unfolding, many believed that Brooke-Popham was near to a nervous collapse. The cabinet envoy Duff Cooper urged his replacement and London agreed. On 27 December, at the height of the Battle of Malaya, Brooke-Popham handed over command to Lieutenant-General Sir Henry Pownall. Brooke-Popham's return to Britain was closely followed by the fall of Singapore on 15 February 1942. Inevitably, Brooke-Popham was associated with the collapse and he was publicly attacked by some in Britain as the man chiefly responsible for the defeat.

=== Later war years ===
In May 1942, Brooke-Popham retired from active service in the RAF for the second time. His reputation severely damaged by the events in the Far East, he nevertheless continued to serve where he could. At some stage in 1942, Brooke-Popham became Inspector-General of the Air Training Corps, a position he held until 1945. From 1944 to 1946, he served as President of the Navy, Army and Air Force Institutes Council.

== Later years ==
After Brooke-Popham relinquished his role as President of the Navy, Army and Air Force Institutes Council, he lived in retirement. Brooke-Popham died in the hospital at RAF Halton in Buckinghamshire on 20 October 1953. His funeral took place at St. Edburg's Church in Bicester and he was buried privately in Somerset.

== Papers ==
Papers relating to Brooke-Popham's service are held in the Liddell Hart Centre for Military Archives at King's College London.

== Footnotes and references ==
Military offices
New title Squadron established	Officer Commanding No. 3 Squadron; 1912–1914	Succeeded by John Salmond
New title RFC deployed to France	Deputy Assistant Adjutant and Quartermaster-General, HQ RFC; 1914–15	Succeeded by Francis Festing
New title Wing established	Officer Commanding No. 3 Wing; 1915	Succeeded by Tom Webb-Bowen
Preceded by Frederick Sykes	Chief of Staff, Royal Flying Corps in the Field; 1915–1916	Succeeded by Philip Game
Unknown	Director of Research; 1919–1921	Succeeded by Ralph Bagnall-Wild
New title College established	Commandant RAF Staff College, Andover; 1922–1926	Succeeded by Edgar Ludlow-Hewitt
Preceded by Edward Ellington	Air Officer Commanding Iraq Command; 1928–1930	Succeeded by Edgar Ludlow-Hewitt
Preceded by William Bartholomew	Commandant of the Imperial Defence College; 1931–1933	Succeeded by Sir Lionel Preston
Preceded by Sir Geoffrey Salmond	Commander-in-Chief Air Defence of Great Britain; 1933–1935	Succeeded by Sir John Steel
Vacant Title last held by Sir Godfrey Paine	Inspector-General of the RAF; 1935	Succeeded by Sir Edward Ellington
New title Command established	Commander-in-Chief Far East Command; 1940–1941	Succeeded by Sir Henry Pownall
