= No. 7 Group RAF =

Former Royal Air Force operations group

No. 7 (Operational Training) Group RAF ~~No. 7 (Training) Group RAF~~ ~~No. 7 Group RAF~~
- Royal Air Force Ensign
- Active: 1 April 1918 - 16 Aug 1919; 20 September 1919 - 12 April 1926; 15 July 1940 - 11 May 1942; 1 November 1944 - 21 December 1945
- Country: United Kingdom
- Branch: Royal Air Force
- Type: Royal Air Force group
- Role: Bomber aircrew training
- Part of: No. 2 Area; South-Western Area; Inland Area; RAF Bomber Command

No. 7 Group RAF (7 Gp) of the Royal Air Force was an RAF group active in the latter part of the First World War, during the 1920s and also in the Second World War.

== Organisational history ==
No. 7 Group was created on the day that the RAF officially came into being. On 1 April 1918 it was created by renaming the Royal Flying Corps' Southern Training Brigade. Initially the Group was subordinate to No. 2 Area and on 8 August the designation "Training" was added making the Group's title No. 7 (Training) Group. With the post war reductions, the Group was disbanded on 16 Aug 1919.

The following month on 20 September 1919, No. 7 Group was reformed when South-Western Area was downgraded to group status. On 1 April 1920, the Group was transferred to Inland Area's control. The Group was disbanded for the second time on 12 April 1926.

Following the outbreak of the Second World War, the Group was reformed on 15 July 1940 as No. 7 (Operational Training) Group under Bomber Command control. It was disestablished by its renaming to No. 92 Group RAF on 11 May 1942.

The Group's final incarnation was from 1 November 1944 to 21 December 1945. Its function was the control of heavy conversion units.

No. 71 Base	No. 72 Base	No. 73 Base	No. 74 Base	No. 75 Base	No. 76 (RCAF) Base
RAF Lindholme (HQ)	RAF Bottesford (HQ)	RAF North Luffenham (HQ)	RAF Marston Moor (HQ)	RAF Swinderby (HQ)	RAF Topcliffe (HQ)
RAF Blyton	RAF Langar	RAF Bottesford	RAF Acaster Malbis	RAF Wigsley	RAF Dalton
RAF Sandtoft	RAF Saltby	RAF Langar	RAF Riccall	RAF Winthorpe	RAF Dishforth
RAF Sturgate		RAF Woolfox Lodge	RAF Rufforth		RAF Wombleton
			RAF Stradishall		

== Commanders ==
=== April 1918 to August 1919 ===
- Unknown
- 1 July 1919 Group Captain T C R Higgins

=== September 1919 to April 1926 ===
- 20 September 1919 Group Captain (later Air Commodore) T C R Higgins
- 1 September 1922 Air Commodore L E O Charlton
- 1 January 1923 Air Commodore E A D Masterman
- 26 November 1924 Air Commodore A M Longmore
- 1 April 1925 Air Commodore D Le G Pitcher

=== July 1940 to May 1942 ===
- 15 July 1940 Air Commodore The Hon R A Cochrane
- 2 November 1940 Air Commodore L H Cockey

=== November 1944 to December 1945 ===
- 1 November 1944 Air Vice-Marshal G S Hodson
- 23 February 1945 Air Vice-Marshal E A B Rice

== See also ==
- List of Royal Air Force groups
