= Lionel Charlton =

Royal Air Force Air Commodore (1879-1958)

Lionel Evelyn Oswald Charlton
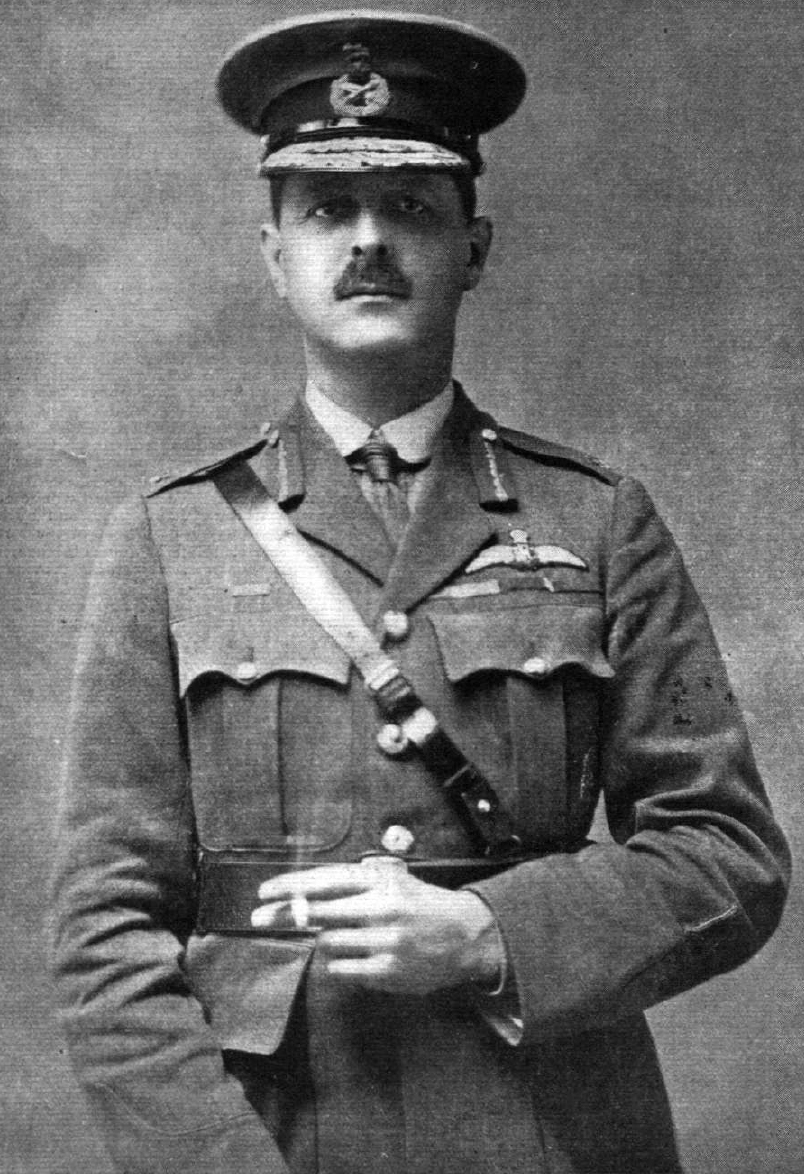
- Brigadier-General L E O Charlton as Air Attaché in Washington
- Born: 7 July 1879; Piccadilly, London
- Died: 18 April 1958 (aged 78); Hexham, Northumberland
- Military career
- Allegiance: United Kingdom
- Branch: British Army (1897–1918); Royal Air Force (1918–1928)
- Service years: 1897–1928
- Rank: Air Commodore
- Commands: No. 3 Group RAF (1924); No. 7 Group RAF (1922); V Brigade RAF (1917–1918); No. 8 Squadron RFC (1915)
- Conflicts: Second Boer War; First World War
- Awards: Companion of the Order of the Bath; Companion of the Order of St Michael and St George; Distinguished Service Order; Mentioned in Despatches (3); Officer of the Legion of Honour (France)

Air Commodore Lionel Evelyn Oswald Charlton, CB, CMG, DSO (7 July 1879 – 18 April 1958) was a British infantry officer who served in the Second Boer War. During the First World War, Charlton held several command and staff posts in the Royal Flying Corps, finishing the war as a brigadier general. Transferring to the Royal Air Force on its creation, Charlton served in several air officer posts until his retirement from the air force in 1928. Most notably, Charlton resigned his position as the RAF's Chief Staff Officer in Kurdistan as he objected to the bombing of Kurdish villages.

== Early life ==
Lionel Charlton was born on 7 July 1879 at Piccadilly in London. He was educated at Brighton College and was commissioned a second lieutenant in the Lancashire Fusiliers on 28 September 1898, followed by promotion to lieutenant on 1 September 1899.

He served with the 2nd Battalion of his regiment in the Second Boer War 1899–1901, including as part of the Ladysmith Relief Force, and was severely wounded at the battle of Spion Kop, for which he received the Distinguished Service Order (DSO). He was promoted captain on 5 October 1901. During the latter part of the war he served with the 3rd Battalion Imperial Yeomanry, and returned home with the other officers and men of this battalion in the SS Kinfauns Castle leaving Cape Town in early August 1902, after the war had ended.

Following their return, he relinquished his commission with the Imperial Yeomanry in September 1902, and returned to the Lancashire Fusiliers. He did not stay long, however, as later the same year he was seconded to serve with the Gold Coast Regiment. He was on 29 April 1908 appointed as an aide-de-camp.

== First World War ==
Shortly before the First World War he transferred to the Royal Flying Corps, becoming one of its first brigadier generals in February 1917.

Charlton was initially as a flight commander on No. 3 Squadron and later as the first Officer Commanding of No. 8 Squadron. On 15 April 1915, when No. 8 Squadron was grouped with No. 13 Squadron to form RFC's new 5th Wing, Charlton temporarily took command until he travelled to France.

== Iraq ==
On 2 February 1923, Air Commodore Charlton took up the post of Chief Staff Officer at the headquarters of the RAF's Iraq Command. It was at this time that the RAF employed the bombing of Kurdistani villages with the intent of pacifying tribal opposition. Charlton opposed this policy and he went on to openly criticize such bombing actions. Within a year of his arrival, Charlton resigned from his post in Iraq. In the same month he arrived, Charlton visited the local hospital in Diwaniya, and was shocked by seeing the wounds of Kurds injured in RAF bombing raids present, later writing in his memoirs that "indiscriminate bombing of a populace... with the liability of killing women and children, was the nearest thing to wanton slaughter."

On his return to Great Britain, Charlton expected to be summoned to see the Chief of the Air Staff, Hugh Trenchard. The summons never came.

When the summons did not come, Charlton requested an interview with Trenchard. Trenchard asked Charlton why he had requested the interview and the following exchange took place:

Charlton: "About my reasons for resigning." Trenchard: "Look here, Charlton. You resigned, and I accept your resignation. There's nothing more to be said." Charlton: "Won't there be an official enquiry, then?" Trenchard: "An inquiry into what? Your conscience? Certainly not."

Although Charlton was barred from further postings in Iraq, he went on to serve as Air Officer Commanding No 3 Group. Charlton requested early retirement, which he was granted.

== Later life ==
In retirement, he became an author of adventure fiction for children. At this time, he also wrote Charlton, an autobiography, published by Penguin Books (no. 163, 1938); this work was rather candid and was written in the third person singular. In 1938, he published The Air Defence of Britain, a reasoned analysis and prediction of the impending Second World War, correctly emphasizing the crucial importance which bombing civilian populations would have. Charlton was homosexual and lived with an old RAF friend, Tom Wichelo; he belonged to a circle including Edward Morgan Forster, Joe Ackerley, Raymond Mortimer and John Gielgud.

== Legacy ==
In recent years, the memory of Charlton was taken up by opponents of the present war in Iraq, and specifically by British opponents of their country's involvement in that war, who hold him up as an example to be emulated by present-day officers.

Commentator Mike Marqusee in The Guardian expressed the opinion that Charlton should have had a monument erected in his honour at London, rather than his fellow RAF commander Arthur "Bomber" Harris who conducted the bombings of Iraq without compunction and went on to bomb the German cities in World War II.

Military offices
| New title Squadron established | Officer Commanding No. 8 Squadron RFC; 1915 | Succeeded by Archibald MacLean |
| New title Wing established | Officer Commanding Fifth Wing RFC; Temporary appointment 1915 | Succeeded by Geoffrey Salmond |
| Preceded by Sefton Brancker | Director of Air Organization; February–October 1917 | Succeeded by Guy Livingston |
| Preceded by C A H Longcroft | Brigadier-General Commanding V Brigade RFC; 1917-1918 | Unknown |
| Preceded by Thomas Higgins | Air Officer Commanding No. 7 Group; 1922 | Succeeded by Edward Masterman |
| Preceded by Tom Webb-Bowen | Air Officer Commanding No. 3 Group; March–December 1924 | Succeeded by Robert Gordon |
