= Alfred Warrington-Morris =

British military senior officer and rugby union player

- Born: 18 December 1883
- Died: 24 March 1962 (aged 78); Chelsea, London, England
- Military career
- Allegiance: United Kingdom
- Branch: Royal Navy; Royal Air Force
- Service years: 1899–1934
- Rank: Air Commodore
- Commands: RAF Signals Branch (1928–34); RAF Electrical and Wireless School (1921–25)
- Conflicts: First World War; Second World War
- Awards: Companion of the Order of the Bath; Companion of the Order of St Michael and St George; Officer of the Order of the British Empire; Air Force Cross; Mentioned in Despatches
- Other work: Commandant of the Royal Observer Corps (1936–42); Deputy Director Air Training Corps (1942–44)

Air Commodore Alfred Drummond Warrington-Morris, CB, CMG, OBE, AFC (18 December 1883 – 24 March 1962) was a senior officer in the Royal Air Force during the first half of the 20th century.

Following his regular military service he became the second Commandant of the Observer Corps and commanded the corps through its adoption by RAF Fighter Command, the crucial operations during the Battle of Britain and the change to the Royal Observer Corps.

== Military career ==
=== Royal Navy ===
Warrington-Morris joined the Royal Navy at the age of 15 in 1899 as a midshipman. He was promoted to sub-lieutenant on 18 December 1902 then to lieutenant in December 1904. In 1912 he was recorded as being a lieutenant commander studying at the Royal Navy Torpedo School HMS Vernon.

Following his training, Warrington-Morris was posted as Torpedo Officer to HMS Swiftsure, the RN Flagship East Indies Station with the rank of acting commander. In 1916 he transferred to the Royal Naval Air Service and was promoted commander on 30 June 1917 as a Senior Wireless Officer.

=== Royal Flying Corps ===
In 1918 Warrington-Morris was posted to the Royal Flying Corps as Staff Officer i/c 1st Class Equipment – Wireless Telegraphy and promoted to acting lieutenant colonel just before the Royal Flying Corps was amalgamated with the Royal Naval Air Service to form the new Royal Air Force (RAF) in April of that year. His commission as a lieutenant colonel was made permanent and gazetted on 22 August 1919 when he was appointed deputy director of Flying Instrumentation.

=== Royal Air Force ===
When RAF rank structure was reorganised in late 1919 Warrington-Morris became a wing commander and his name was removed from the Royal Navy list. He was appointed Commandant, RAF Electrical and Wireless School on 1 August 1921 and was promoted to group captain in January 1922.

On 1 January 1925 Warrington-Morris was promoted to air commodore and appointed Senior Air Staff Officer (SASO) at RAF HQ Iraq Command. In March 1927 he became the RAF's representative to the Ordnance Committee at Woolwich but, by September 1928, he was declared as a supernumerary air commodore at the RAF Central Depot. Between 1928 and 1934 he was Commandant RAF Signals Branch until retirement as a regular officer.

== Royal Observer Corps ==
In 1934, on leaving the RAF, Warrington-Morris was employed as the Deputy Commandant of the Observer Corps under Air Commodore Edward Masterman at RAF Uxbridge. Between 1935 and 1936 he was appointed Commandant of Southern Area of the Observer Corps during the massive and crucial expansion and development of the corps during the inter war years. When Air Commodore Masterman stood down as commandant in April 1936, Warrington-Morris replaced him and took control of the Observer Corps during the important period immediately prior to the Second World War. He oversaw the move of HQ Observer Corps to RAF Bentley Priory and the corps' adoption by RAF Fighter Command. He also controlled the corps during the memorable events of the Battle of Britain and was still at the helm when the Observer Corps was granted the title 'Royal' prefix to become the Royal Observer Corps and became a uniformed branch of the RAF. He was Mentioned in Despatches in July 1940.

== Later appointments ==
On leaving the Royal Observer Corps in June 1942, Warrington-Morris was recommissioned as an air commodore in Class CC and served in the Admin and Special Duties Branch of the RAF. From 26 December 1942 until 8 November 1944 he was deputy director of the Air Training Corps by then holding a reserve nominal rank of wing commander.

== Sporting achievements ==
Warrington-Morris played international rugby union for England in 1909 at the age of 25 and later represented the RAF playing hockey in 1919. He was still playing rugby for RAF Flowerdown, of which he was at the time Station Commander, in 1922 at the age of 39.

Warrington-Morris was a founder member of the RAF Rugby Union, which was formed at a meeting on 15 January 1920. He became the sole selector and Honorary Treasurer and was to hold the financial appointment, or others on the committee, until his death 42 years later, making him the longest-serving member of the Union.

Warrington-Morris was the Treasurer from the 1919–20 year until 1924–25, then again from 1933–1934 until 1956–57, and finally from 1958–1959 until 1961–62. He was also the chairman in 1923–1924 and 1924–25, then from 1927–1928 until 1932–33. During this time he rose in rank from wing commander to air commodore; "an extremely faithful servant of the RAFRU by anyone's standards".

On the day of his death, against doctors' orders, Warrington-Morris went to Twickenham and watched the RAF achieve a 19–14 victory over the army in a game of rugby. He collapsed and died on the way home from the match.

To mark his service, the RAFRU Committee named a new Inter-Station Shield competition trophy in his honour (The Warrington Morris Shield), and it is still played for to this day.

Government offices
Preceded by Edward Masterman	Commandant Observer Corps; Royal Observer Corps from 1941; 1936–1942	Succeeded by Geoffrey Ambler
