= Auchy =

Auchy may refer to:

- Auchy-au-Bois, commune in the Pas-de-Calais department in the Nord-Pas-de-Calais region of France
- Auchy-lès-Hesdin, commune in the Pas-de-Calais department and Nord-Pas-de-Calais region of France
- Auchy-la-Montagne, commune in the Oise department in northern France
- Auchy-les-Mines, commune in the Pas-de-Calais department in the Nord-Pas-de-Calais region of France
- Auchy-lez-Orchies, commune in the Nord department in northern France
- Villers-sur-Auchy, commune in the Oise department in northern France

== See also ==
- Silvin of Auchy (c. 650 – 717 or 718), an evangelist in the area of Thérouanne, which is now in northern France
