= Francis Worgan Festing =

Major-General Sir Francis Worgan Festing KCMG CB
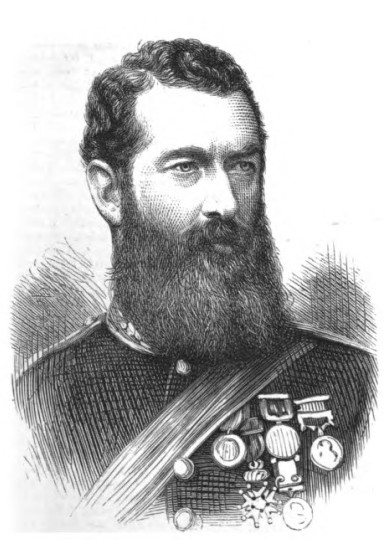
- Born: 24 July 1833; High Littleton, Somerset
- Died: 21 November 1886 (aged 53); Newbury, Berkshire
- Relatives: Brigadier General Francis Leycester Festing (son); Field Marshal Sir Francis Festing (grandson)
- Military career
- Allegiance: United Kingdom
- Branch: Royal Marines
- Service years: 1850–1886
- Rank: Major-General
- Commands: Royal Marine Artillery
- Conflicts: Crimean War: Siege of Sebastopol; Battle of Kinburn; Second Opium War; Third Anglo-Ashanti War
- Awards: Knight Commander of the Order of St Michael and St George; Companion of the Order of the Bath; Knight of the Legion of Honour (France)

Major-General Sir Francis Worgan Festing, KCMG, CB (24 July 1833 – 21 November 1886) was a British Royal Marines officer.

== Early life ==
Festing, second son of Captain Benjamin Morton Festing of the Royal Navy by Caroline Jane, only daughter of F. B. Wright of Hinton Blewett, Somersetshire, was born at High Littleton, Somerset, 24 July 1833. He was educated at the Royal Naval College, New Cross, and at the age of sixteen entered the Royal Marines as a cadet, and was gazetted a second lieutenant on 3 July 1850.

== Military career ==
In 1854 Festing served with the Baltic expedition. He commanded a mortar in the flotilla employed against Sebastopol from June 1855 until the fall of that fortress and was also at the bombardment and surrender of Kinburn. For these services he received the Crimea Medal and the Turkish Crimea Medal, and was made a Knight of the Legion of Honour by France.

Festing's next war services were with the China expedition of 1857–59 as adjutant of the artillery, when he assisted in the blockade of the Canton River and in the bombardment and storming of the city, and was rewarded with the Second China War Medal and the brevet rank of major.

In January 1865 the schooner Ocean was wrecked on the Woolsiner Sand Bank off Hayling Island. Festing, using the RMA cutter used for towing targets for Fort Cumberland manned by 12 Hayling fishermen, rescued three from the crew of five. This rescue resulted in national publicity and the establishment of a lifeboat on Hayling Island. Festing was awarded the RNLI's silver medal for Gallantry.

Festing served throughout the Third Anglo-Ashanti War of 1873–74, and when the Ashantee army under Amanquatia threatened Cape Coast Castle, he was selected to command the detachment of marines sent to the Gold Coast in May 1873 to assist in repelling the Ashantee army, which was then encamped at Mampom, between Abrakampa and the river Prah, and within nine miles of Cape Coast Castle. The chiefs of Ehina were asked to lay down their arms, and on their refusal their town was attacked on 13 June. Festing commanded the forces in the two engagements fought on that day, when the Ashanti were defeated and their town burnt. On the arrival of Sir Garnet Wolseley, Festing was placed in command at Cape Coast, and charged with the measures for the defence of the place. He was taken on Wolseley's list of special service officers on 20 October, and took the command of the camp at Dunquah and of the advanced posts. He commanded the forces at the engagements near Dunquah on 27 October, when he was slightly wounded, and on 3 November, when he was severely wounded while trying to rescue Lieutenant Eardley Wilmot of the Royal Artillery, who had fallen mortally wounded. He was afterwards placed in charge of the camp at Prahsu. He held a dormant commission to administer the government of the Gold Coast while commanding the regular troops, and was of the executive council. He was specially allowed to retain the rank of colonel (brevet colonel, 7 January 1874) in the army for his distinguished services in the field at the conclusion of the war, and was appointed a Companion of the Order of the Bath on 31 March 1874, knighted as a Knight Commander of the Order of St Michael and St George on 8 May 1874, and received the thanks of both Houses of Parliament on 30 March 1874.

Grave of Francis Worgan Festing

Festing was appointed assistant adjutant-general of the Royal Marines in August 1876, made an aide-de-camp to the Queen on 7 July 1879, gazetted colonel commandant of the Royal Marine Artillery on 3 September 1886, and promoted to major general on 5 October 1886.

== Death and family ==
Festing died at Donnington Lodge, Newbury on 21 November 1886, and was buried with military honours at Eastney cemetery, Portsmouth, on 26 November. He had been married three times, first, in 1862, to Margaret Elizabeth, daughter of A. Hall of Watergate, Sussex; she died at Hayling Island on 3 June 1864; secondly, in 1869, to Charlotte Letitia, daughter of R. J. Todd; she died in 1871; thirdly, on 14 September 1876, to Selina Eleanor Mary, only daughter of Leycester William Carbonell.
