= John Hearson =

- Born: 5 August 1883
- Died: 9 January 1964 (aged 80)
- Military career
- Allegiance: United Kingdom
- Branch: British Army (1901–18); Royal Air Force (1918–40)
- Service years: 1901–27; 1937–40
- Rank: Air Commodore
- Commands: No. 30 (Balloon Barrage) Group (1937–39); No. 1 Air Defence Group (1927); Special Reserve and Auxiliary Air Force (1925–27); 15th Wing RFC (1916–17); No. 5 Squadron RFC (1915–16)
- Conflicts: First World War; Second World War
- Awards: Companion of the Order of the Bath; Commander of the Order of the British Empire; Distinguished Service Order; Mentioned in Despatches; Order of Saint Anna, 3rd Class with Swords (Russia)

Air Commodore John Glanville Hearson, CB, CBE, DSO (5 August 1883 – 9 January 1964) was a squadron and wing commander and senior staff officer in the Royal Flying Corps during the First World War, and a senior commander in the fledgling Royal Air Force (RAF) during the 1920s.

== Military career ==
Pearson was commissioned a second lieutenant in the Royal Engineers on 31 July 1902. He transferred to the Royal Air Force on its formation.

He reached the rank of brigadier general in 1917, and became the RAF's first Director of Training on the service's formation in April 1918. Remaining in the RAF after the war, he was promoted to air commodore on 30 June 1923. In the first half of the 1920s he held senior positions on RAF Iraq Command, the British organisation responsible for maintaining control of Iraq.

Hearson was appointed a Commander of the Order of the British Empire (CBE) in the 1924 Birthday Honours.

Towards the end of 1925 Hearson was appointed Air Officer Commanding the Special Reserve and Auxiliary Air Force which later became the Air Defence Group and then No. 1 (Air Defence) Group. Hearson retired from the RAF in 1927 but returned to service in the build up before the Second World War to establish and command the UK's barrage balloon organisation.

Military offices
Preceded by Guy Livingston	Chief Staff Officer, HQ Training Division RFC; 1917–1918	Royal Flying Corps subsumed into RAF
New title RAF established	Director of Training; 1918–1919	Succeeded by Philip Game; As Director of Training and Organisation
Vacant No. 30 Group disbanded from 1919 to 1937	Air Officer Commanding No. 30 (Balloon Barrage) Group; 1937–1939	Succeeded by W J Y Guilfoyle
