= Walter Caddell =

Brigadier-General Walter Buckingham Caddell (22 September 1879 – 20 April 1944) was a Royal Artillery, Royal Flying Corps and Royal Air Force officer who served in a number of senior military aviation appointments during World War I.

Born on 22 September 1879, the son of Lieutenant-Colonel Henry Caddell and his wife Anna Matilda (née Persse), Walter Caddell was to grow up in a large family being the fourth child amongst nine children.

He was commissioned a Second lieutenant in the Royal Garrison Artillery on 26 May 1900, and promoted to the rank of Lieutenant on 29 March 1902.

In March 1916 Caddell was appointed Deputy Assistant Director of Military Aeronautics at the War Office in London. He effectively served as the chief assistant to Brigadier-General Duncan MacInnes, the Director of Aircraft Equipment. It was in that capacity that he was introduced to George Constantinescu who had developed an experimental synchronization gear. With support from the Military Aeronautics Directorate, Constantinescu's synchronization gear was improved and deployed on aircraft in France. Archibald Low and the RFC Experimental Works, Feltham were under his command. In April 1917 Caddell took over from an overworked and exhausted MacInnes as Director of Aircraft Equipment. He retired from the RAF on 28 May 1919 with the honorary rank of brigadier-general.

Military offices
| Preceded by D S MacInnes | Assistant Director of Military Aeronautics; 1916-1917 | Succeeded by J G Weir |
| Preceded by D S MacInnes | Director of Aircraft Equipment; April–December 1917 | Succeeded by A Huggins |
