= Donald MacInnes =

Canadian politician

The Honourable Donald MacInnes
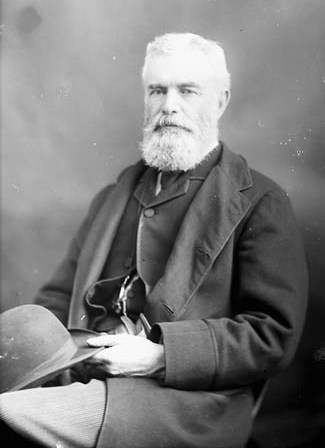

Canadian Senator from Ontario
- In office December 24, 1881 – December 2, 1900
- Appointed by: John A. Macdonald

Personal details
- Born: May 26, 1824 Oban, Scotland
- Died: December 1, 1900 (aged 76) Clifton Springs, New York, U.S.
- Resting place: Hamilton Cemetery, Ontario
- Party: Liberal-Conservative

Donald MacInnes, born Donald McInnes, (26 May 1824 – 1 December 1900) was a Canadian businessman and politician.

== Background ==
Born in Oban, Scotland, the son of Duncan McInnes and Johanna Stuart, McInnes's family emigrated to Upper Canada in 1840 and settled in Ontario. He was married on April 30, 1863, to Mary Amelia Robinson, daughter of Sir John Robinson, 1st Baronet, of Toronto; they had five sons and a daughter (including Duncan Sayre MacInnes).

MacInnes was for several years one of the leading merchants in Canada. He was president of the Bank of Hamilton and a director of the Canada Life Assurance Co. He was chairman of the royal commission appointed June 16, 1880, to inquire into the organization of the civil service of Canada. He was appointed to the Senate on the advice of John Alexander Macdonald representing the senatorial division of Burlington, Ontario, on December 24, 1881. A Liberal-Conservative, he served for almost 19 years until his death in 1900.
