= Duncan Sayre MacInnes =

British Army general

Brigadier-General Duncan Sayre MacInnes CMG DSO
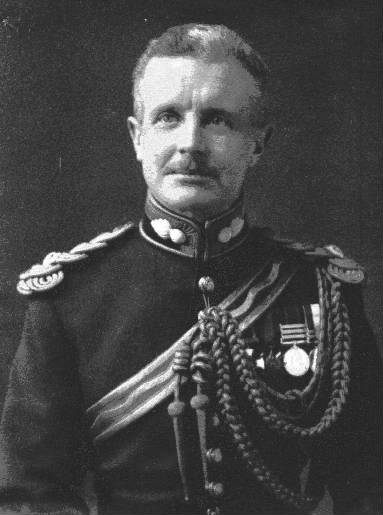
- Born: 21 February 1860; Brantford, Canada West
- Died: 23 May 1918 (aged 58); Étaples, France
- Burial place: Étaples, France
- Military career
- Allegiance: United Kingdom
- Branch: British Army
- Service years: 1891-1918
- Rank: Brigadier-General
- Units: Royal Engineers; Royal Flying Corps
- Awards: DSO CMG, Order of St. Stanislas, 1st Class (Russia), Officer of The Legion of Honour (France).
- Other work: Inspector of Mines, G.H.Q., 1st Echelon

Brigadier-General Duncan Sayre MacInnes CMG DSO (21 February 1860 – 23 May 1918) was a Canadian soldier and engineer who served in South Africa before, during and after the Second Boer War. Before and during World War I, MacInnes played a key role in the establishment and development of the Royal Flying Corps. He was accidentally killed while visiting the front on 23 May 1918.

== Education ==
Duncan Sayre MacInnes entered the Royal Military College of Canada at Kingston, Ontario in 1887, cadet # 236. He graduated with distinction in 1891 and was awarded the sword of honour. He was later awarded the Governor-General gold medal.

== Family ==
His father was Senator Donald MacInnes from Hamilton, Ontario, and his mother was the fourth daughter of Sir John Robinson, 1st Baronet, of Toronto. Duncan Sayre MacInnes married May Millicent Wolferstan Thomas, the daughter of a prominent Montreal banker, Francis Wolferstan Thomas, and his first wife, Harriet, daughter of The Hon. George Jervis Goodhue on 22 October 1902. They had one daughter and one son.

== Career ==
MacInnes was commissioned a second lieutenant in the Royal Engineers of the British Army on 16 July 1891. Promoted lieutenant on 18 July 1894, he served in the Ashanti expedition of 1895–96. He erected a fort at the Ashanti capital of Kumasi (in modern-day Ghana). After the outbreak of the Second Boer War in South Africa, he was appointed principal staff officer to Lieutenant-Colonel Robert Kekewich, who commanded the garrison during the siege of the town of Kimberley, South Africa. Between May and November 1900 MacInnes was engaged in field operations in the Orange River Colony. He was appointed a Companion of the Distinguished Service Order (DSO) in 1901 for his work in the war. On 1 April 1902 he was promoted to captain.

Following the end of the war in May 1902, he served as assistant director of works to the South African Constabulary in the Cape Colony. In 1904, he and other Canadians celebrated Dominion Day at a banquet in Johannesburg, South Africa. He served as deputy assistant quartermaster general at Halifax, Nova Scotia in 1906, turning over the fortress and garrison to Canada. From September 1907 he was deputy assistant adjutant-general, Maritime provinces. On 31 March 1908, he went to England where he attended the British Army Staff College. In 1910, he was gazetted a general staff officer in the Directorate of Military Training at the War Office. Early in 1912 he became secretary and one of the three main contributors to an advisory committee on military aviation of the Committee of Imperial Defence whose recommendations led to the establishment of the Royal Flying Corps.

== World War I ==
In 1913, he was posted to the staff at Camberley, where he remained until the outbreak of World War I in August 1914. He was in command of the 54th field company of Royal Engineers, part of the 7th Division, participated in the retreat from Mons, and in late November received a wound which permanently restricted the use of fingers on his right hand. Promoted Brevet Lieutenant-Colonel on 29 November 1915, he went back to the War Office as assistant director of military aeronautics. In 1916, he was appointed director of aircraft equipment, in charge of design, supply, and maintenance, and subsequently made a temporary brigadier-general. Faced with extraordinary demands for more and better aircraft, an overwhelmed system of procurement, and malicious attacks from superiors, an overworked MacInnes suffered a breakdown in the fall of 1916 and he left the directorate in early 1917.

Retiring by nature and uninterested in honours, he was rewarded with a Companion of the Order of St Michael and St George on 1 January 1917. He went back to the Western Front to become commanding Royal Engineer to the 42nd Division, in the substantive rank of Lieutenant-Colonel. During the war he was mentioned in Despatches twice. He was awarded the Russian Order of St Stanislaus, with the French Legion of Honour (Croix d'Officier) in 1917.

In January 1918 he was appointed inspector of mines at general headquarters in Montreuil, France, and restored to the rank of Brigadier General. MacInnes was accidentally killed while visiting the front on 23 May 1918, possibly as a result of his work with mines, and he was buried at Étaples, France on 25 May 1918.

== Legacy ==
Colonel C.S. MacInnes instituted the Duncan Sayre MacInnes Memorial Scholarship in 1951 in memory of his brother the late Brigadier-General Duncan Sayre MacInnes, CMG, DSO, Royal Engineers. The scholarship is awarded to the Fourth Year cadet at the Royal Military College of Canada who is considered the most deserving of those who accept a regular commission in the military occupation of Aerospace Controller by reason of academic standing, character, and proficiency in classification training.

== Bibliography ==
- Davies, Frank (1997). Bloody Red Tabs: General Officer Casualties of the Great War 1914–1918. London: Pen & Sword Books. ISBN 978-0-85052-463-5.

Military offices
New title Second Assistant Director post created alongside that held by Major William Beatty	Assistant Director of Military Aeronautics; 1915-1916	Succeeded by W B Caddell
New title Directorate of Military Aeronautics reorganized	Director of Aircraft Equipment; 1916-1917	Succeeded by W B Caddell
