= Auchy-la-Montagne =

- Commune
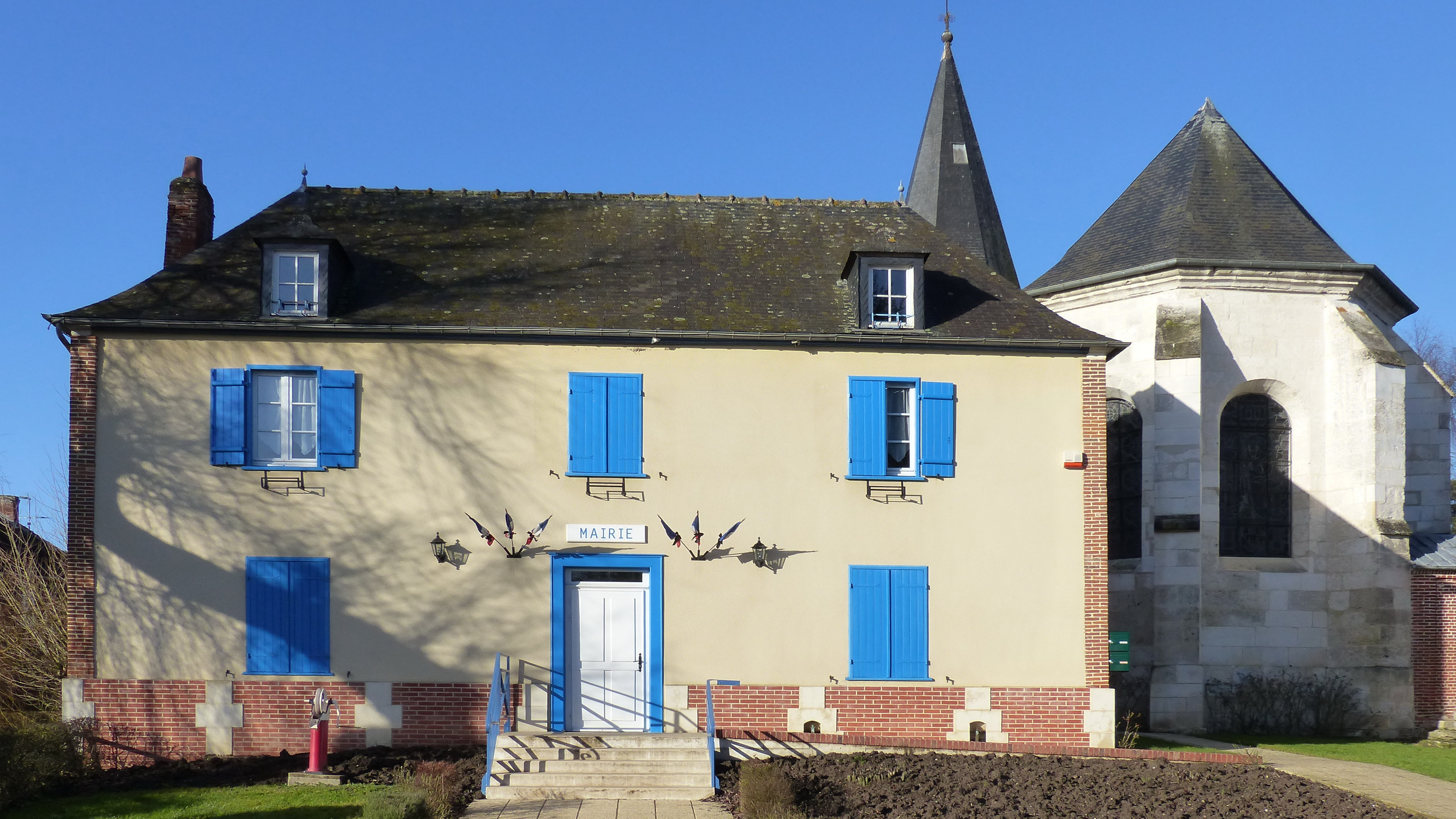
- The town hall in Auchy-la-Montagne
- Location of Auchy-la-Montagne
- Location within France Location within Hauts-de-France
- Coordinates: 49°34′31″N 2°07′06″E
- Country: France
- Region: Hauts-de-France
- Department: Oise
- Arrondissement: Beauvais
- Canton: Saint-Just-en-Chaussée
- Intercommunality: CA Beauvaisis

Government
  - Mayor (2020–2026): Alain Rousselle
- Area^{1}: 8.05 km^{2} (3.11 sq mi)
- Elevation: 173 m (568 ft)
- Highest elevation: 181 m (594 ft)
- Lowest elevation: 143 m (469 ft)
- Population (2023): 562
  - Density: 69.8/km^{2} (181/sq mi)
- Time zone: UTC+01:00 (CET)
  - Summer (DST): UTC+02:00 (CEST)
- INSEE/Postal code: 60026 /60360
- ^{1} French Land Register data, which excludes lakes, ponds, glaciers > 1 km^{2} (0.386 sq mi or 247 acres) and river estuaries.

Auchy-la-Montagne (French pronunciation: [oʃi la mɔ̃taɲ]) is a commune in the Oise department in northern France.

== Population ==
Historical population
Year	Pop.	±% p.a.
1968	256	—
1975	263	+0.39%
1982	280	+0.90%
1990	385	+4.06%
1999	439	+1.47%
2007	469	+0.83%
2012	533	+2.59%
2017	592	+2.12%
2023	562	−0.86%
Source: INSEE

== See also ==
- Communes of the Oise department
