= Francis Leycester Festing =

British Army general (1877–1948)

Brigadier-General Francis Leycester Festing CB CMG
- Born: 25 July 1877
- Died: 17 October 1948 (aged 71)
- Relatives: Major General Sir Francis Festing (father); Field Marshal Sir Francis Festing (son)
- Military career
- Allegiance: United Kingdom
- Branch: British Army
- Service years: 1895–1919
- Rank: Brigadier-General
- Conflicts: Mahdist War; Second Boer War; First World War
- Awards: Companion of the Order of the Bath; Companion of the Order of St Michael and St George; Mentioned in Despatches (4)

Brigadier-General Francis Leycester Festing, CB, CMG (25 July 1877 – 17 October 1948) was a senior officer in the Royal Flying Corps during the First World War. Promoted to major on 1 September 1915, just over two years later he received a temporary promotion to brigadier general on 10 October 1917 and took up post as the Deputy Adjutant-General at the headquarters of the Royal Flying Corps in France. He was promoted on 3 June 1918 to brevet colonel.

Festing was the son of Major General Sir Francis Festing. He married Charlotte Katharine Grindall Festing (his second cousin) and, in 1902, they had one child, Francis Wogan Festing, who rose to the rank of field marshal in the British Army.
