= Thomas Higgins (RAF officer) =

Royal Air Force Air Commodore (1880-1953)

- Born: 21 July 1880
- Died: 22 September 1953 (aged 73)
- Military career
- Allegiance: United Kingdom
- Branch: Royal Navy (1894–1900); British Army (1900–1918); Royal Air Force (1918–1945)
- Service years: 1894–1929; 1939–1945
- Rank: Air Commodore
- Commands: No. 10 Group (1928–1929); No. 7 Group (1919–1922); VI Brigade RAF (1917–1919); Brigade RFC (1917); No. 39 Squadron RFC (1916)
- Conflicts: Second Boer War; First World War; Second World War
- Awards: Companion of the Order of the Bath; Companion of the Order of St Michael and St George

Air Commodore Thomas Charles Reginald Higgins, CB, CMG, DL (21 July 1880 – 22 September 1953) was an early British aviator and senior Royal Flying Corps commander during the First World War. He was one of the small number of Royal Flying Corps generals in latter stages of the War.

== Career ==
Higgins initially served in the Royal Navy, but on 14 March 1900 he joined the British Army and commissioned as a second lieutenant in The King's Own (Royal Lancaster Regiment). He saw active service in the Transvaal, Natal and on the Zululand Frontier during the Second Boer War, and was promoted to lieutenant on 25 July 1900. From 1904 to 1909 Higgins was seconded to overseas service as part of the West African Frontier Force. After his return to Great Britain, Higgins learnt to fly in 1911, gaining Royal Aero Club Certificate No. 88.

After flying duties in the Royal Flying Corps in 1915, Higgins was appointed to increasing senior posts, commanding No. 39 Squadron, the Home Defence Wing and from September 1917 the Home Defence Brigade.

Remaining in the Royal Air Force after the First World War, Higgins served as Director of Training at the Air Ministry, Chief Staff Officer in Iraq and Air Officer Commanding No. 10 Group before retiring towards the end of 1929.

Higgins was appointed a Companion of the Order of the Bath (CB) in the 1926 Birthday Honours.

Military offices
Vacant Brigade formed by re-designating the Home Defence Brigade Title last held by J M Salmond in 1916	Brigadier-General Commanding 6th Brigade RFC; October 1917 - July 1919	Brigade disestablished
