= Kirschstein =

Kirschstein is a German surname meaning "cherry stone". It may refer to:

- Hans Kirschstein (1896–1918), German fighter pilot
- Leonore Kirschstein (1933–2017), German soprano
- Ruth L. Kirschstein (1926–2009), U.S. pathologist and public health administrator
- Sascha Kirschstein (born 1980), German footballer
- Wilhelm Kirschstein (1863–1946), German schoolteacher and mycologist
- Jean Kirschstein, a fictional character from the Attack on Titan series. also spelled as "Jean Kirstein".
