= Hans Kirschstein =

German flying ace (1896–1918)

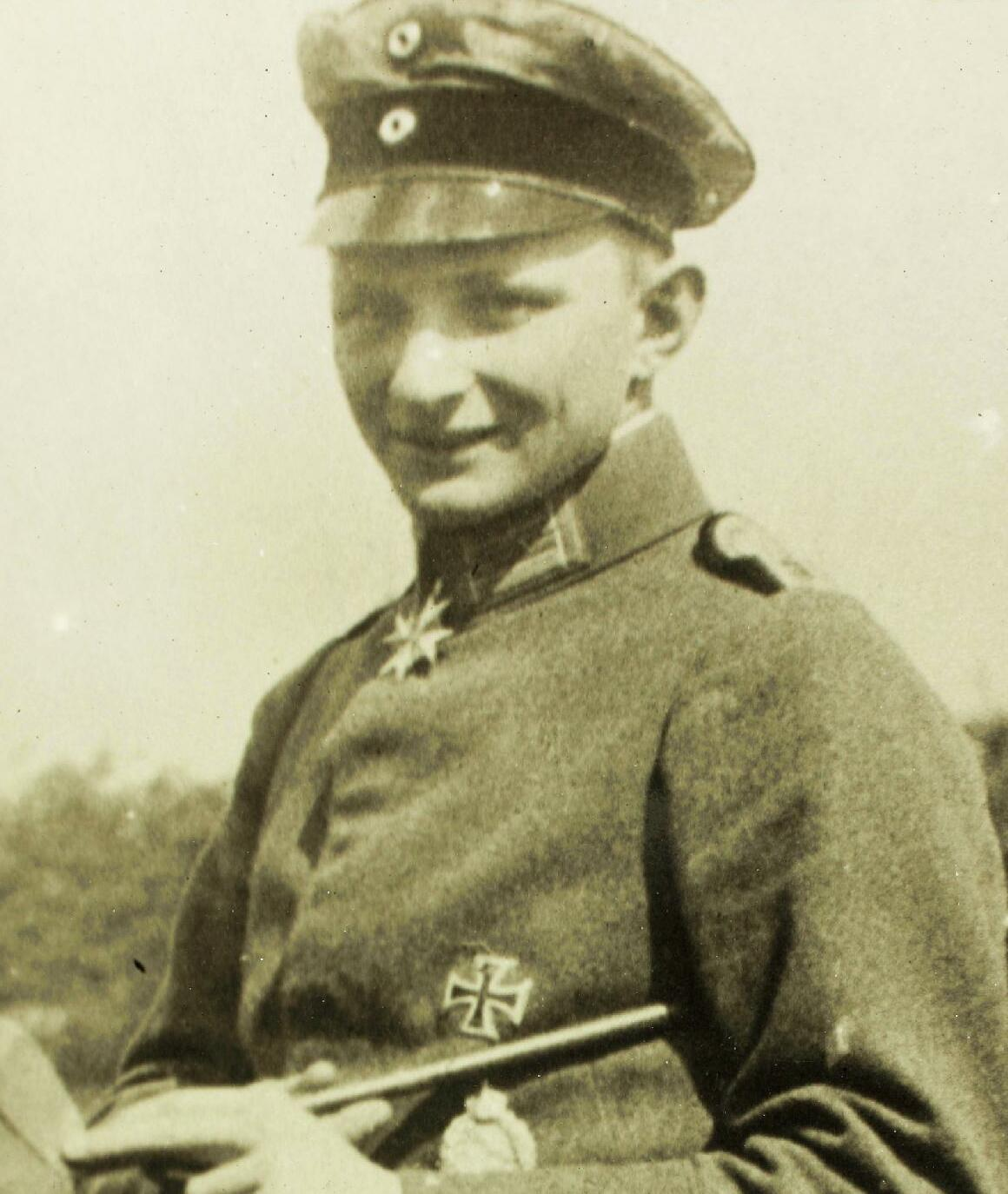
- Kirschstein c. 1918
- Born: 5 August 1896; Koblenz, Rhine Province, Germany
- Died: 16 July 1918 (aged 21); Fismes, France
- Military career
- Allegiance: German Empire
- Branch: Pioneers, Air Service
- Service years: 1914–1918
- Rank: Leutnant
- Units: 3rd Pioneer Battalion, Flieger-Abteilung (Flier Detachment) 19; Flieger-Abteilung (Flier Detachment) 256; Flieger-Abteilung (Flier Detachment) 3; Jagdstaffel 6 (Fighter Squadron 6)
- Commands: Jagdstaffel 6
- Awards: Pour le Merite; Royal House Order of Hohenzollern; Iron Cross

Hans Kirschstein (5 August 1896 – 16 July 1918), winner of the Pour le Merite, Royal House Order of Hohenzollern, and the Iron Cross, 1st and 2nd class, was a German lieutenant and World War I flying ace credited with 27 aerial victories.

== Early life ==
Hans Kirschstein was born 5 August 1896 in Koblenz, in the Prussian Rhine Province of Germany. His father headed the provincial government. Hans first attended school in Gummersbach, from 1907 in Gross-Lichterfelde near Berlin. In August 1914 he joined the German Army as a combat engineer in the Prussian 3rd Pioneer Battalion von Rauch (1st Brandeburgian) in Spandau. He served in France and Galicia; in the latter assignment, he contracted malaria in 1915. He was invalided home to recuperate, returning to duty in December 1915.

== Aerial service as bomber pilot ==
In February 1916, he applied for transfer to aviation duty. His transfer was granted and he took pilot's training at Schliessheim in May 1916. Upon graduation, he flew bombing raids for Flieger-Abteilung (Flier Detachment) 19. Some of these raids were among the earliest examples of air attacks upon tanks. One was on Dover, England. Kirschstein won an Iron Cross Second Class for his service. In 1917, he continued his service as a two-seater pilot, moving on to Flieger-Abteilung (Flier Detachment) 256, and from there to Flieger-Abteilung (Flier Detachment) 3.

== Duty as fighter pilot ==
He applied for transfer to fighter duty in early 1918. He received fighter training and was assigned to a Prussian fighter squadron, Jagdstaffel 6 on 13 March 1918. He would become this squadron's leading ace.

He scored his first victory on 18 March, flying a Fokker Dr.I in one of the great aerial battles of the war, in which the entirety of Manfred von Richthofen's fighter wing was committed to battle en masse. Kirschstein began by shooting down a Sopwith Camel. He scored twice more in March, on the 27th. First of them was Armstrong Whitworth F.K.8, piloted by Alan McLeod and his observer Arthur Hammond, McLeod was during action wounded six times and received Victoria Cross, Hammond was three times, lost his leg and received bar to his Military Cross. He continued to score regularly; on 15 May, he shot down a Sopwith Camel and two Bristol F.2bs for his ninth, tenth, and eleventh triumphs. By the end of May, he was a triple ace, with 15 victories.

In early June, Jagdstaffel 6 upgraded from Fokker Dr.Is to Fokker D.VIIs. Kirschstein would fly two of the new airplanes, both entirely painted with black and white stripes as an optical illusion to confuse enemy aim. His Fokker Dr.I was handed on to Ernst Udet, who would be Germany's highest scoring ace to survive the war. He would fly them to 12 more victories in June, with his final win being his 27th on 24 June 1918. He would also ascend to command of the squadron on 10 June. He was awarded the Pour le Merite, Germany's highest award for valor in battle, on 24 June 1918.

== Death by flying accident ==
On 16 July, Kirschstein flew one of his planes in for maintenance at the repair depot at Fismes. He was accompanied by a new pilot in his Jasta, Leutnant Johannes Markgraf, flying formation in a two-seater Hannover CL. After leaving the Fokker, Kirschstein climbed into the rear seat of the Hannover for the return trip. Markgraf, who was unfamiliar with the Hannover, stalled it out at about 50 meters altitude on takeoff. The crash killed both men.
