= RAF Throwley =

Former RAF station in Kent, England

RAF Throwley ~~Throwley Aerodrome~~
- Near Throwley, Kent in England

Site information
- Type: Royal Air Force base
- Owner: Air Ministry
- Operator: Royal Air Force; Royal Flying Corps

Location
- Shown within Kent RAF Throwley (the United Kingdom)
- Coordinates: 51°14′52″N 000°51′07″E

Site history
- Built: 1917
- In use: 1917-1919
- Battles/wars: First World War

Airfield information
- Elevation: 112 metres (367 ft) AMSL
Runways
| Direction | Length and surface |
|---|---|
| 00/00 | Grass field |

Royal Air Force Throwley or more simply RAF Throwley is a former Royal Air Force (RAF) installation located 1.2 miles (1.9 km) south of Throwley, Kent and 7 miles (11 km) north of Ashford, Kent, England. The installation was also used by the Royal Flying Corps and was previously called Throwley Aerodrome before being taken over by the RAF in April 1918 and renamed to its current name.

== History ==
Land situated between Bells Forstal and Throwley Forstal, including Dodds Willows and the Bells Forstal farmhouse, was acquired by the Royal Flying Corps in 1916 for use as a landing ground for home defence squadrons defending London and the Thames Estuary and Kent. From October 1916 50 Squadron RFC detached aircraft to Throwley. In July 1917 newly formed 112 Squadron was based with a variety of biplane fighters including the Sopwith Pup, Sopwith Camel and Sopwith Snipe. In February 1918 143 Squadron was formed at Throwley flying the Armstrong Whitworth F.K.8 but it moved soon after to nearby RAF Detling.

188 Squadron was formed at Throwley on 20 December 1917 as a training unit with the Avro 504K, in June 1918 the squadron provided training for the units flying the Sopwith Camel. In March 1919 188 Squadron RAF was disbanded and in June 1919 112 Squadron RAF was disbanded and the land was returned to agricultural use.

=== Units and aircraft ===
- No. 50 Squadron RFC (1916–1918) detachments from Detling Aerodrome
- No. 112 Squadron RFC/RAF (1918–1919) Sopwith Pup, Sopwith Camel and Sopwith Snipe
- No. 142 Squadron RFC (1918) Armstrong Whitworth F.K.8
