= No. 188 Squadron RAF =

Defunct flying squadron of the Royal Air Force

- Active: 20 Dec 1917 – 1 March 1919
- Country: United Kingdom
- Branch: Royal Air Force
- Motto: None

Insignia
- Squadron Badge: None
- Squadron Code: XD (Apr 1939 – Sep 1939)

No. 188 Squadron RAF was a Royal Flying Corps and Royal Air Force Squadron that was a night training unit towards the end of World War I.

== History ==
=== Formation in World War I ===
The squadron formed at Throwley Aerodrome on 20 December 1917 to train night-fighter pilots and was equipped with Avro 504s. It also trained pilots to fly the Sopwith Camel and Sopwith Pup at night. It disbanded on 1 March 1919 and never reformed in later years, however a squadron code was allocated to it in 1939.

== Aircraft operated ==
Aircraft operated by No. 188 Squadron RAF
From	To	Aircraft	Variant
Dec 1917	Mar 1919	Avro 504	K
Jun 1918	Mar 1919	Sopwith Camel	
Jun 1918	Mar 1919	Sopwith Pup	

- No. 188 Squadron is depicted in the 1969 film The Battle of Britain led by Squadron Leader Canfield, played by Michael Caine.

No 188 squadron is also depicted in the film 'An Appointment in London' starring Dirk Bogarde & Dinah Sheridan.
