= Throwley =

Village in Kent, England

Coordinates: 51.2654°N 0.8543°E

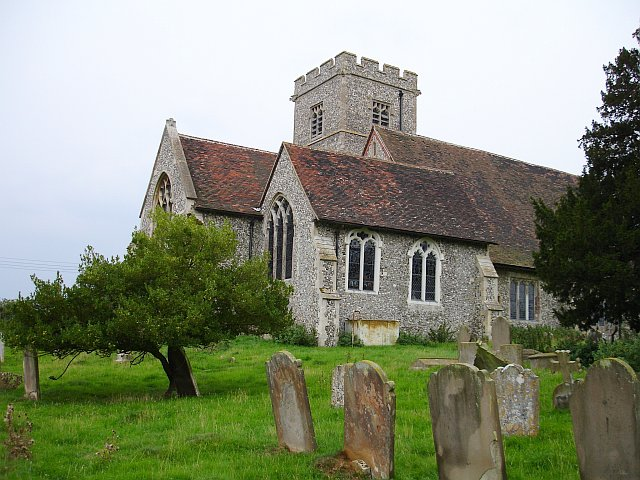

- Location within Kent
- Population: 300 (2011 Census)
- District: Swale
- Shire county: Kent
- Region: South East
- Country: England
- Sovereign state: United Kingdom
- Post town: Faversham
- Postcode district: ME13
- Dialling code: 01795
- Police: Kent
- Fire: Kent
- Ambulance: South East Coast
- UK Parliament: Faversham and Mid Kent

Throwley is an English village south of Faversham in the Borough of Swale in Kent. The name is recorded in the Domesday Book as Trevelai, which corresponds with a Brittonic origin, where "trev" means a settlement or farm house and "elai" typically relates to a fast moving river or stream (cf. Trelai (showing the loss of terminal "f") in Cardiff). In 2011 the parish had a population of 300.

== History ==
At the end of the civil wars of 1139-53, King Stephen's chief lieutenant William of Ypres gave the churches of Throwley and Chilham to the Abbey of Saint Bertin in Saint-Omer, France. Throwley Priory was built as a cell of that Benedictine house. It was dissolved as part of Henry IV's general suppression of alien priories in 1414 and granted to Thomas Beaufort, the half-brother of the king's father. Beaufort gave Throwley to Syon Abbey on 13 July 1424, a gift confirmed by Henry VI in 1443.

A Royal Flying Corps airfield was established in the Parish during the First World War to provide a landing ground for fighter biplanes defending London, the Thames Estuary and Kent. It was located near Bells Forstal.

== Geography ==
Throwley lies on top of the Kent North Downs in an Area of Outstanding Natural Beauty. The landscape is mainly arable fields and woodland copses covering just over 5 square miles.

== Demography ==
The population of around 130 households is scattered across a number of hamlets the largest of which is Throwley Forstal.

== Landmarks ==
Within the parish is Belmont House and Gardens, an 18th-century house with a fine collection of clocks and beautiful gardens. The estate was owned by successive generations of the Harris family, it is now held in trust.

== Religion ==
The Parish church is St Michaels and All Angels which is built of flint, inside are monuments to the Harris and Sondes families. The church tower has a ring of eight bells.
