= Alan Arnett McLeod =

Canadian recipient of the Victoria Cross

Alan Arnett McLeod VC
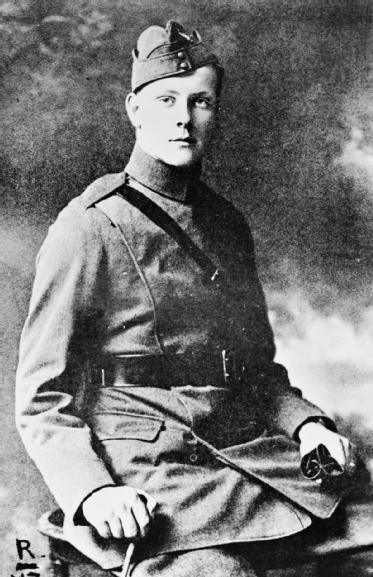
- Born: 20 April 1899; Stonewall, Manitoba, Canada
- Died: 6 November 1918 (aged 19); Winnipeg, Manitoba, Canada
- Burial place: Winnipeg (Old Kildonan) Presbyterian Cemetery
- Military career
- Allegiance: Canada; United Kingdom
- Branch: Canadian Army (1913–14); British Army (1917–18); Royal Air Force (1918)
- Service years: 1913–1914; 1917–1918
- Rank: Lieutenant
- Units: No. 51 Squadron RFC; No. 2 Squadron RFC
- Conflicts: First World War
- Awards: Victoria Cross

Alan Arnett McLeod, VC (20 April 1899 – 6 November 1918) was a Canadian soldier, aviator, and a recipient of the Victoria Cross, the highest award for gallantry in the face of the enemy that can be awarded to British and Commonwealth forces. McLeod served as a pilot in the Royal Flying Corps and later the Royal Air Force during the First World War.

== Early life ==
Alan McLeod grew up in Stonewall, Manitoba, the son of a doctor. He enrolled in The 34th Fort Garry Horse in 1913 at age 14. When the First World War broke out in 1914, McLeod was sent home as under age. He then tried several times to enlist in the army in Winnipeg, and in the cadet wing of the Royal Flying Corps (RFC) in Toronto. As he turned 18 he successfully enrolled in the RFC. He trained as a pilot at Long Branch near Toronto, and soloed after only 3 hours flight time. He graduated with 50 hours of flying experience. On 20 August 1917 he was shipped overseas to France.

== First World War ==
McLeod was originally posted to No. 82 Squadron RFC flying scouts, but when his commanding officer found he was 18 he had McLeod posted to No. 51 Squadron RFC on Home Defence duties flying at night. McLeod was then posted to No. 2 Squadron RFC, a Corps Squadron working near Hesdigneul in northern France, flying his first operation in December 1917. With Lieutenant Comber as his gunner, he claimed a Fokker Dr.I destroyed in January. On 14 January with Lieutenant Reginald Key as his observer, McLeod destroyed an observation balloon near Beauvin. He was recommended for mentioned in despatches for this exploit and the exploit that eventually lead to his Victoria Cross.

=== Victoria Cross ===
McLeod was an 18-year-old second lieutenant in No. 2 Squadron when the following deed took place for which he was awarded the Victoria Cross.

On 27 March 1918 over Albert, France, McLeod, with his observer Lieutenant Arthur Hammond, in an Armstrong Whitworth F.K.8 destroyed an enemy triplane and were immediately attacked by eight more, three of which they brought down. During the fight, both McLeod and Hammond were wounded by machine gun bullets, the petrol tank was punctured and the aircraft set on fire. McLeod instantly pushed her over into a very steep side-slip, but the flames were scorching him, and so he jumped out of his cockpit on to the left wing and crouched low, with the joystick pulled hard over in his right hand. Then he smashed a hole through the fabric in the fuselage so that he could reach the rudder-wire with his left hand, and so he guided her towards the lines. In this way he kept the flames away from his wounded observer and prevented the aircraft from burning up. When the machine finally crashed in No Man's Land, the young pilot, not minding his own injuries, dragged his comrade from the burning wreckage and under heavy fire carried him to comparative safety, before collapsing from exhaustion and loss of blood.

Leutnant Hans Kirschstein of Jasta 6, an experienced ace was credited with the victory. McLeod was wounded three times in the side and Hammond was wounded six times. Hammond lost a leg but was awarded a Bar to his Military Cross.

McLeod was recommended for a Distinguished Service Order but received the Victoria Cross. He returned to Canada (Stonewall, Manitoba) to recuperate but died from the Spanish Influenza epidemic shortly thereafter. He was only 5 months away from celebrating his 20th birthday.

== Tribute ==
Dr. David Christie, of Westminster Church, Winnipeg, wrote a moving tribute which appeared in the Manitoba Free Press on the evening of 7 November, the day after McLeod's death.

Alan McLeod was the finest flower of chivalry. The old days of knighthood are over, but for the very fairest blossoms of the spirit of knighthood the world has had to wait till the 20th Century. It was these dauntless boys who have saved civilization. The heroism of the Crusades pales before the incredible and quiet courage of such boys who gave us a new interpretation of Calvary. I saw Alan within a few hours of his death. He faced the last enemy with the same joyous confidence with which he started on what he called the very happiest part of his life. For our children's children names like Alan McLeod's will be written in letters of splendour in the annals of Canada.

There is a street in Stonewall, Manitoba named after McLeod. His former family home is the McLeod Tea House and Stonewall Collegiate has his likeness as a bust displayed in the high school library.

In 1974 Alan Arnett McLeod, V.C. was inducted into Canada's Aviation Hall of Fame at a ceremony in Edmonton, Alberta.

Number 301 (Alan McLeod V.C.) Squadron, Royal Canadian Air Cadets was formed in Stonewall, Manitoba on 29 January 2009.

The primary student quarters at 3 Canadian Forces Flying Training School is named the Lt Alan McLeod Building.

On 9 May 2017, a Commonwealth War Graves Commission stone marker and descriptive bronze plaque was placed next to the McLeod family plot, where he is buried along with his mother (Margaret Annett McLeod, 1877–1966) and father (Dr. Alexander Neil McLeod, 1868–1940). It is unique in that Alan McLeod is the only VC recipient who died on active service to be buried in Canada.

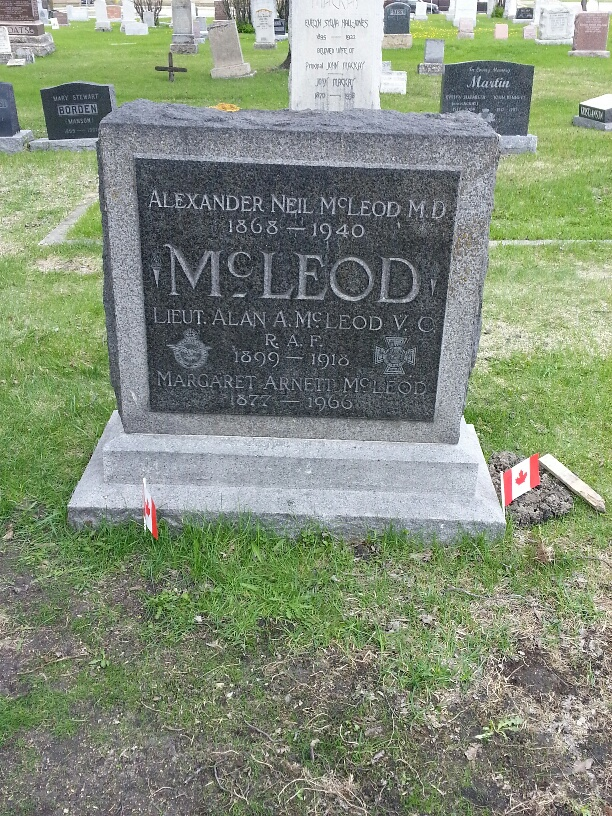
Alan Arnett McLeod VC family grave marker

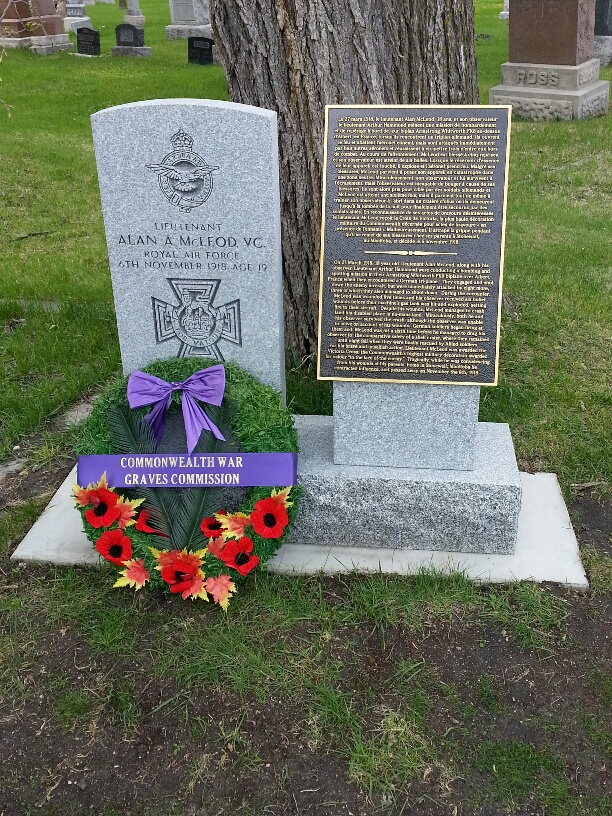
Alan Arnett McLeod VC Commonwealth War Graves Commission marker and plaque

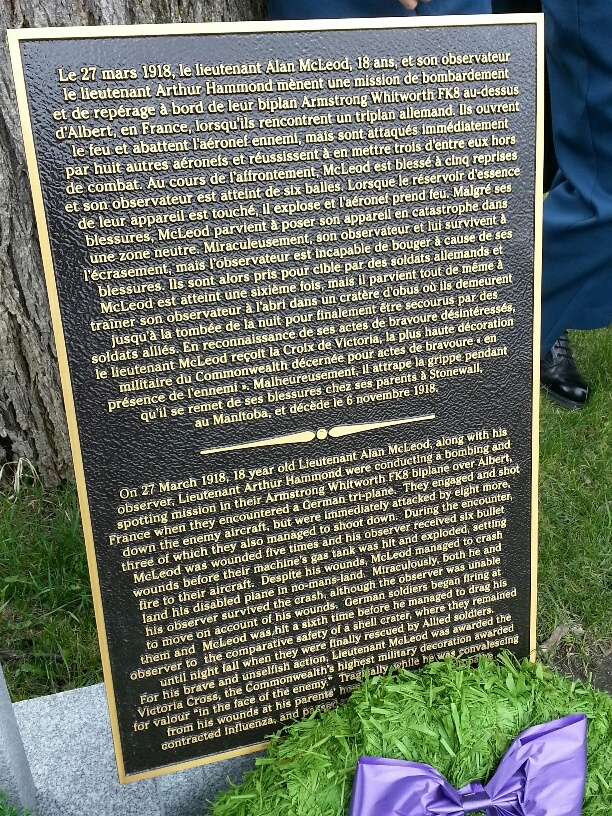
Alan Arnett McLeod VC Commonwealth War Graves Commission plaque
