= No. 2 Squadron RAF =

Flying squadron of the Royal Air Force

No. II (AC) Squadron RAF
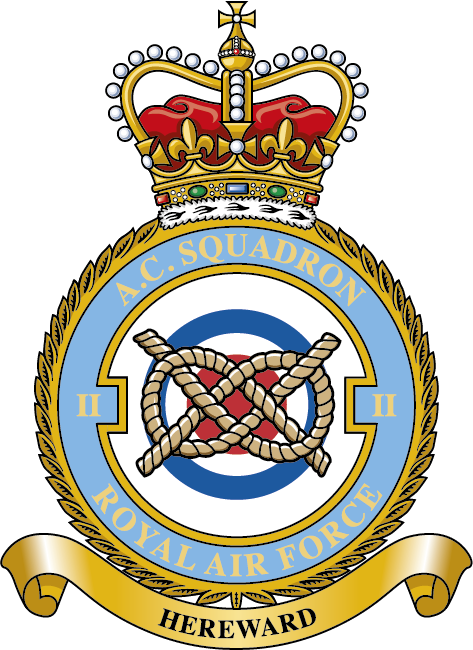
- Squadron badge
- Active: 1912–1918 (RFC); 1918–1920; 1920–2015; 2015–present
- Country: United Kingdom
- Branch: Royal Air Force
- Type: Flying squadron
- Role: Multi–role combat
- Part of: Combat Air Force
- Station: RAF Lossiemouth
- Nickname: 'Shiny Two'
- Mottos: 'Hereward – Guardian of the Army'; Second to none
- Aircraft: Eurofighter Typhoon FGR4

Commanders
- Current commander: Wing Commander E E Rickards
- Notable commanders: Jock Stirrup; Philip Sturley; Chris Nickols; Richard Garwood; Stephen Hillier

Insignia
- Tail badge

- Post-1950 roundel
- Tail codes: KO (Nov 1939 – May 1941); XV (May 1941 – 1943); OI (Sep 1946 – Apr 1951); B (Apr 1951 – 1955); A–Z (Tornados)

Number 2 Squadron, also known as No. II (Army Co-operation) Squadron, is the most senior squadron of the Royal Air Force. It is currently equipped with the Eurofighter Typhoon FGR4 at RAF Lossiemouth, Moray, since reforming there on 12 January 2015.

No. 2 Squadron's traditional army co-operation role is reflected in the "AC" of its title, its motto 'Hereward – Guardian of the Army', and the symbol of a wake knot on its crest. Its unofficial nickname is Shiny Two.

== History ==
=== Early years and First World War (1912–1918) ===
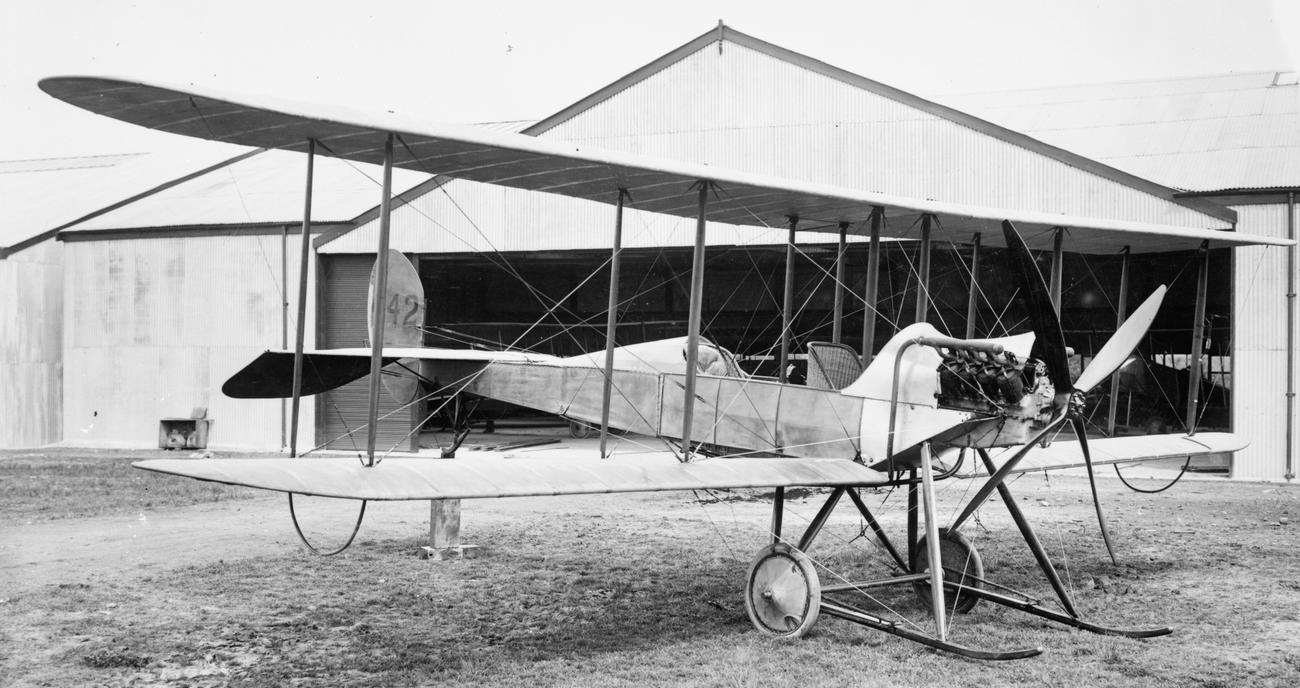
Royal Aircraft Factory B.E.2 of No. 2 Squadron at Montrose, Scotland, 1913

No. 2 Squadron was formed at Farnborough, Hampshire on 13 May 1912, on the founding of the Royal Flying Corps as one of the first three squadrons of the new force. It was formed from a detachment of No. 2 (Aeroplane) Company of the Royal Engineers Air Battalion. Both No. 2 Squadron and No. 3 Squadron were equipped with fixed wing aeroplanes, while No. 1 Squadron was equipped with airships. The Squadron's first commander was Major C J Burke. The Squadron was equipped with a mixture of aircraft types, including the prototype Royal Aircraft Factory B.E.2.

From 26 February 1913, the squadron was based at Montrose Air Station in Angus, Scotland, the first operational Royal Flying Corps base in the UK. This was established on the instructions of the First Lord of the Admiralty, Winston Churchill, to protect the Royal Navy. At Montrose the ghost story of Desmond Arthur spread around the flying corps. In May 1914, when the Squadron was transferring south from Montrose, five aircraft crashed when they hit a bank of fog just south of the River Tees. Six of the aircraft had to land, with five of them crash landing, resulting in many injuries and two deaths (a Lieutenant and a First Class Mechanic) in a field near Hutton Bonville in the North Riding of Yorkshire.

No. 2 Squadron was the first to fly the English Channel into France at the start of the First World War with H.D. Harvey-Kelly being the first pilot to land his aircraft. The squadron spent the war on reconnaissance duties in France flying, amongst other aircraft, the B.E.2.

Although its principal role was not air-to-air combat, it still had one flying ace among its ranks in Arthur William Hammond. It also numbered the first aviation Victoria Cross winners in its ranks, in Second Lieutenant Rhodes-Moorhouse and Lieutenant Alan Arnett McLeod.

=== Interwar period (1919–1938) ===
The squadron gained the 'AC' in its title in the inter-war years, flying army co-operation (AC) sorties during the partition of Ireland in the early 1920s. After time in China during 1927, the squadron re-equipped with the Armstrong Whitworth Atlas again on army co-operation work.

=== Second World War (1939–1945) ===
At the outbreak of the Second World War the unit was flying Westland Lysanders. In France until the Dunkirk evacuation. It was then based at RAF Sawbridgeworth in Hertfordshire as the principal squadron in that location. Over time the squadron equipped with fighters – the Curtiss Tomahawk in 1941, the North American Mustang in 1942. In July 1944, assigned to the 2nd Tactical Air Force, the squadron returned to France in the reconnaissance role. It was re-equipped with Supermarine Spitfire Mk.XIVs in November 1944. Shiny Two relocated to RAF Celle in June 1945 after the war in Europe was won as part of the British Air Forces of Occupation.

=== Cold War (1946–1988) ===
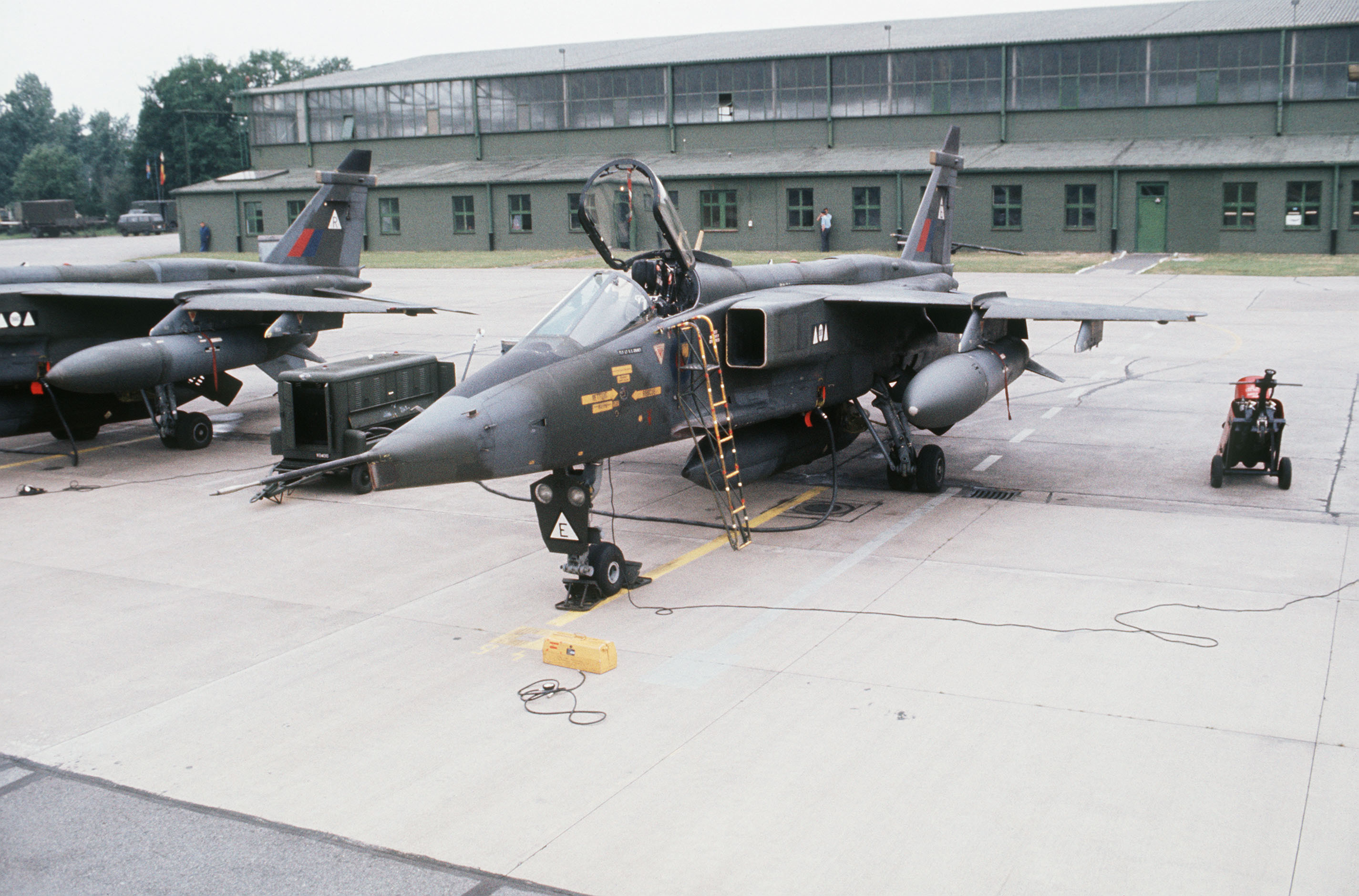
No. II (AC) Squadron SEPECAT Jaguar GR1s at RAF Wildenrath in Germany during 1978

The squadron spent much of the Cold War in West Germany as part of RAF Germany, flying various fighter types, including the Supermarine Swift FR.5 and Hawker Hunter FR.10. No. II (AC) Squadron began to convert to the McDonnell Douglas Phantom FGR.2 in December 1970, when they received XV485 at RAF Brüggen. The Hunter No. II (AC) Squadron at RAF Gütersloh continued to operate in tandem with the Phantom No. II Squadron at Brüggen until 1 March 1971 when conversion to the Phantom was completed. Shiny Two flew their first Phantom reconnaissance sortie on 8 January with XV485. The Phantom-equipped No. II (AC) Squadron relocated to RAF Laarbruch on 3 May 1971. Shiny Two began to convert to the SEPECAT Jaguar GR1 in 1976, with XZ101 being delivered on 26 February 1976, with the Phantom FGR.2s being replaced by October the same year.

=== Tornado era (1988–2015) ===
No. II (AC) Squadron began to convert to the Panavia Tornado GR1 on 16 December 1988, when their first Tornados were delivered to RAF Laarbruch. Elements of the squadron were deployed to the 1991 Gulf War. Along with much of the RAF, No. 2 Squadron withdrew from Germany after returning from the Gulf War – moving to RAF Marham in Norfolk flying the Panavia Tornado GR1A coming under the control of RAF Strike Command. These were upgraded to the latest GR4 standard, with which the Squadron deployed at part of Operation Telic in Iraq during 2003. For this operation the squadron received a battle honour with the right of emblazonment on the Squadron Standard.

In September 2012, a memorial dedicated to all those who served on No. 2 Squadron and to those that gave their lives whilst serving on the squadron was unveiled at the National Memorial Arboretum in Staffordshire. The design, planning and fund-raising for the memorial took three years and it features a Roman numeral 'II' carved from black granite. A service was held at the memorial which involved a flypast by a Supermarine Spitfire of the Battle of Britain Memorial Flight and No. 2 Squadron Tornado GR4. The service was attended by Air Chief Marshal Lord Jock Stirrup and The Venerable (Air Vice-Marshal) Ray Pentland, RAF Chaplain in Chief.

The squadron has deployed on several occasions to maintain the Tornado GR4 detachment in Afghanistan. It also saw action over Libya during Operation Ellamy/Operation Unified Protector for which it received a further battle honour. The Squadron also operated eight aircraft from RAF Akrotiri in Cyprus as part of Operation Shader, the coalition strikes against the extremist group ISIS.

In August 2014, the squadron deployed three Tornados equipped with the RAPTOR reconnaissance pod and the Litening III targeting pod to N'Djamena in Chad for Operation Turus, to take part in the search for Nigerian schoolgirls kidnapped by Boko Haram.

=== Eurofighter Typhoon (2015–present) ===
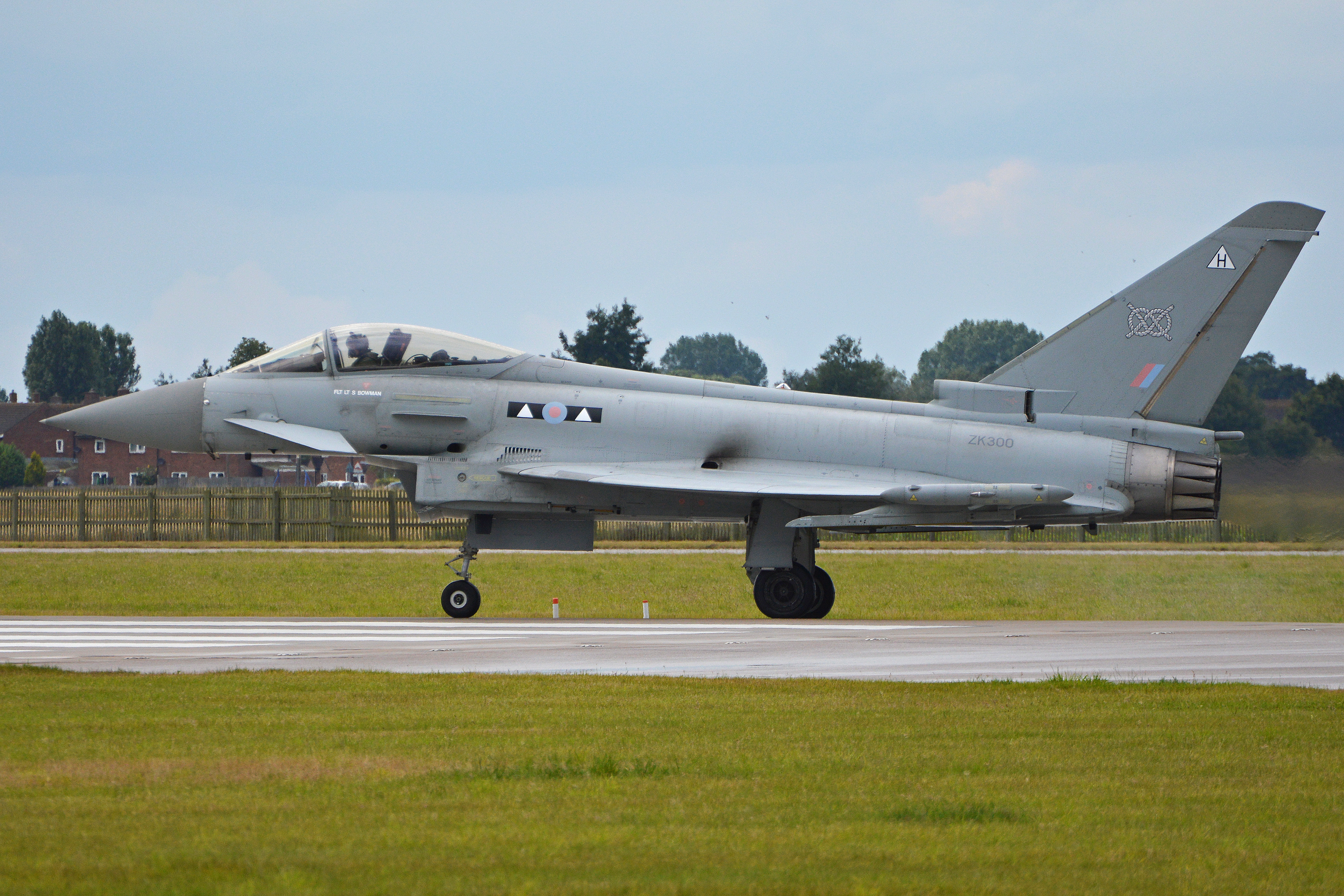
A Eurofighter Typhoon FGR4 seen in No. 2 Squadron markings

In December 2013, it was announced that following the squadron's scheduled 2014 deployment to Afghanistan as part of Operation Herrick, it was to stand down on 31 March 2015 as a Tornado squadron at Marham, and reactivate the following day (1 April 2015) as a Eurofighter Typhoon squadron at RAF Lossiemouth in Scotland. However, in October 2014, Prime Minister David Cameron said that the squadron's disbandment and reformation would be put on hold to allow Tornados to continue supporting strikes against ISIS.

As a consequence of this new plan, the new No. 2 Squadron formed at Lossiemouth on 12 January 2015, with the old No. 2 Squadron at Marham being re-designated as No. 12 Squadron on 9 January.

During October and November 2016, four No. 2 Squadron Typhoons and support personnel deployed to the Far East to take part in exercises with Japan and South Korea. The Squadron operated from the Japan Air Self Defense Force base at Misawa on Honshu, to take part in Exercise Guardian North 16. Subsequently, the Squadron was based at Osan Air Base in South Korea and took part in Exercise Invincible Shield, alongside the Republic of Korea Air Force and United States Air Force. It was the first time either Japan or South Korea had hosted exercises with a foreign nation other than the United States.

The squadron was awarded the Freedom of Angus on 26 July 2019, marking 106 years since it was first stationed at Montrose Air Station as part of the Royal Flying Corps. A parade took place in Montrose, which included a flypast of the squadron's Typhoons.

== Aircraft operated ==
- Bristol Boxkite (1912)
- Breguet G.3 biplane (1912)
- Royal Aircraft Factory B.E.1 (1912)
- Farman S.7 Longhorn (1912)
- Royal Aircraft Factory B.E.2 (1912)
- Henry Farman Biplane (1912)
- Royal Aircraft Factory B.E.2a (1912)
- Farman S.11 Shorthorn (1914)
- Royal Aircraft Factory R.E.1 (1914)
- Royal Aircraft Factory B.E.2c (1914)
- Royal Aircraft Factory R.E.5 (1914)
- Vickers FB.5 (1915)
- Royal Aircraft Factory B.E.2b (1915)
- Bristol Scout (1915)
- Royal Aircraft Factory B.E.2d (1916)
- Royal Aircraft Factory B.E.2e (1917)
- Armstrong Whitworth F.K.8 (1917)
- Bristol F.2b Fighter (1920)
- Armstrong Whitworth Atlas (1929)
- Hawker Audax (1933)
- Hawker Hector (1937)
- Westland Lysander I (1938)
- Westland Lysander II (1940)
- Westland Lysander III (1940)
- Curtiss Tomahawk I (1941)
- Curtiss Tomahawk II (1941)
- North American Mustang I (1942)
- North American Mustang IA (1944)
- North American Mustang II (1944)
- Vickers-Supermarine Spitfire XIV (1944)
- Vickers-Supermarine Spitfire XI (1945)
- Vickers-Supermarine Spitfire PR.19 (1946)
- Gloster Meteor FR.9 (1950–1951)
- Gloster Meteor PR.10 (1951–1956)
- Supermarine Swift FR.5 (1956–1960)
- Hawker Hunter FR.10 (1960–1971)
- McDonnell Douglas Phantom FGR.2 (1970–1976)
- SEPECAT Jaguar GR1 (1976–1988)
- Panavia Tornado GR1A (1988–2001)
- Panavia Tornado GR4A (2001–2015)
- Eurofighter Typhoon FGR4 (2015 – present)
A selection of aircraft previously operated by No. 2 Squadron
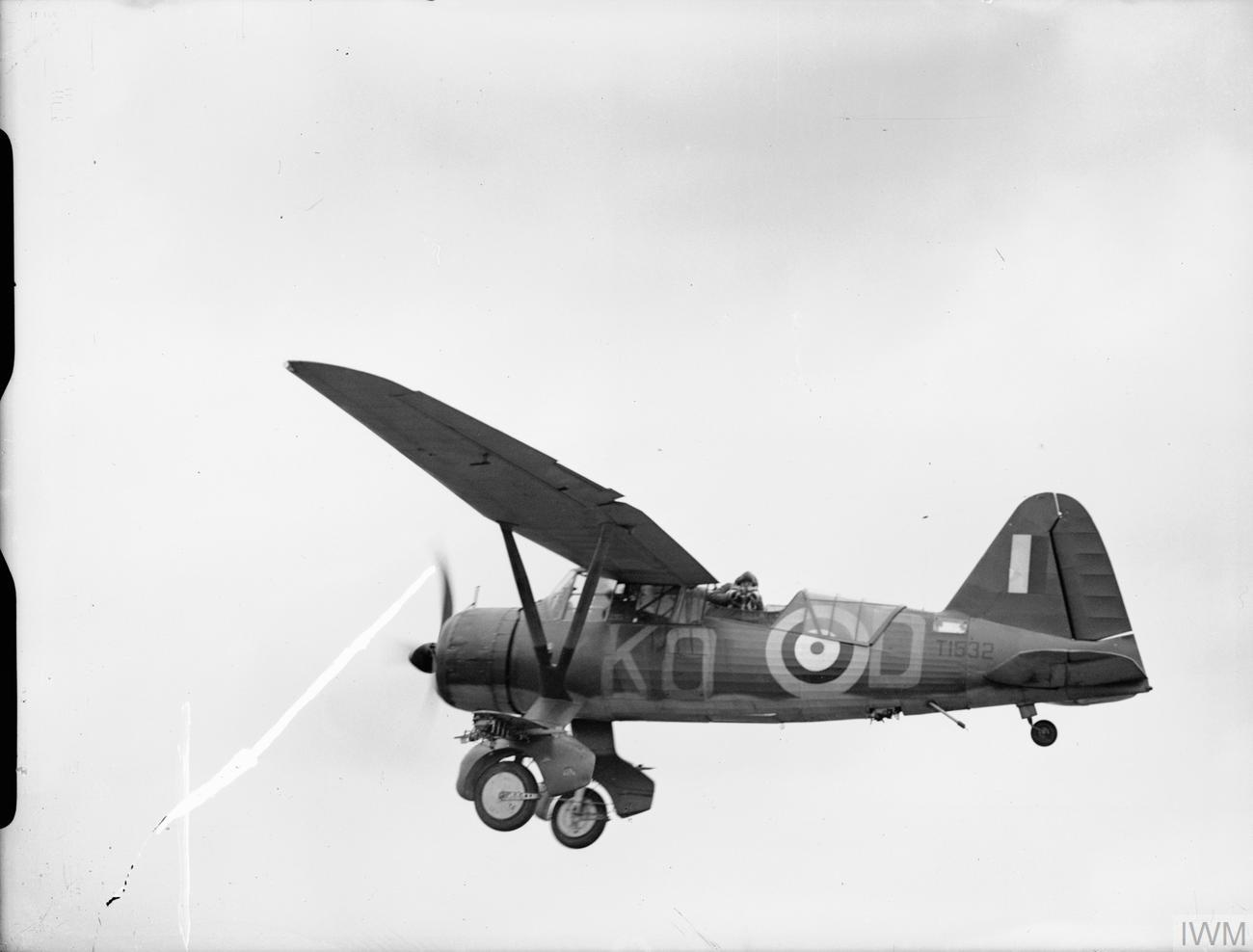
A RAF Westland Lysander Mk.III of No. 2 Squadron during the Second World War.

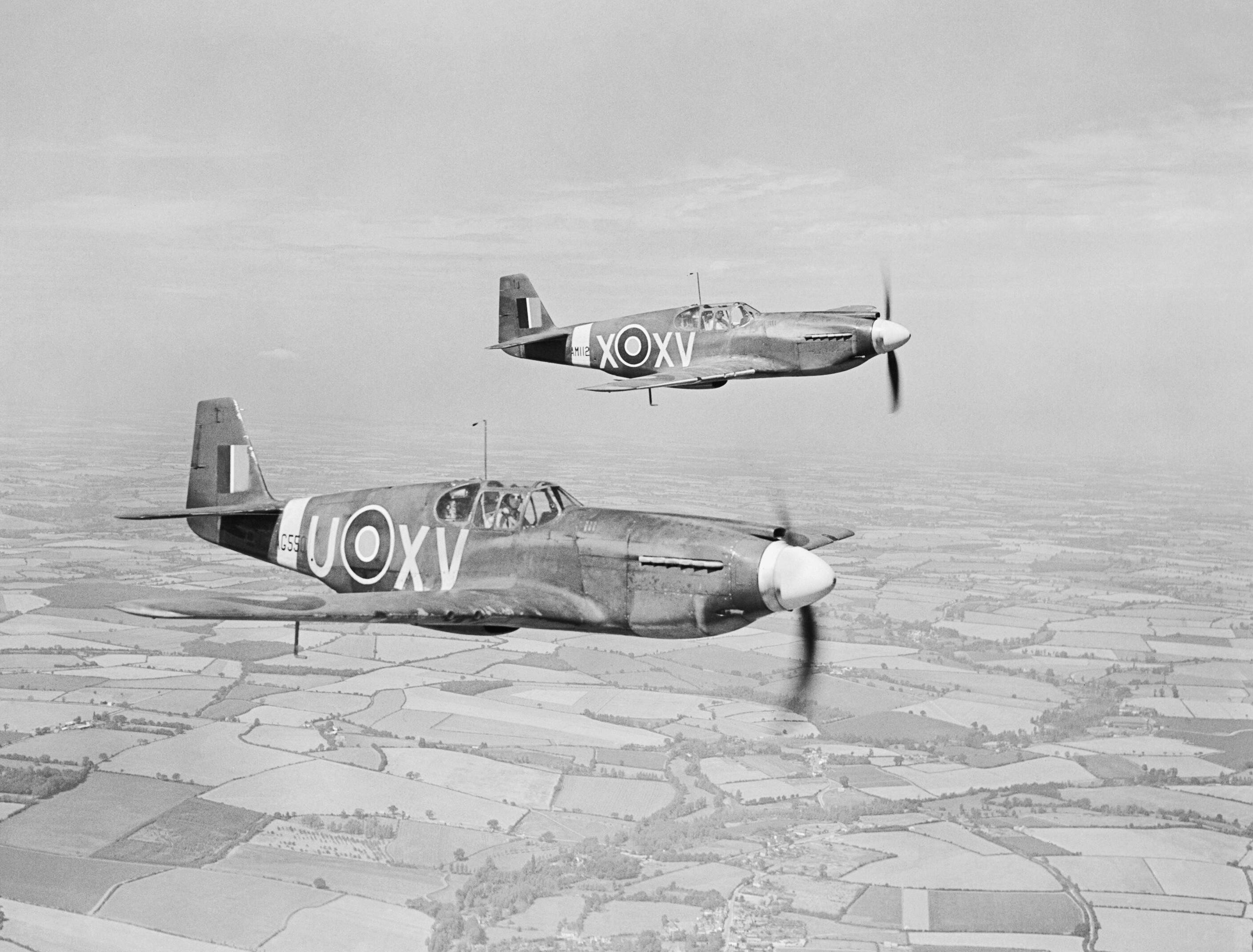
Two No. 2 Squadron North American Mustang I in 1942.

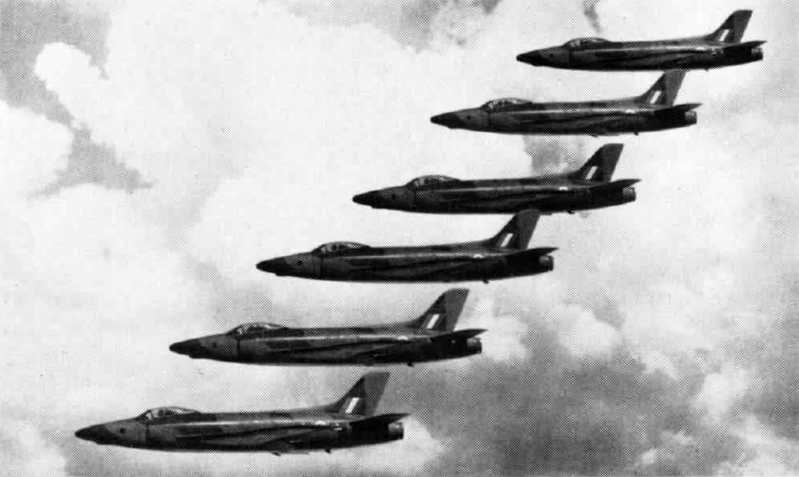
Supermarine Swift FR.5s of No. 2 Squadron in 1956.

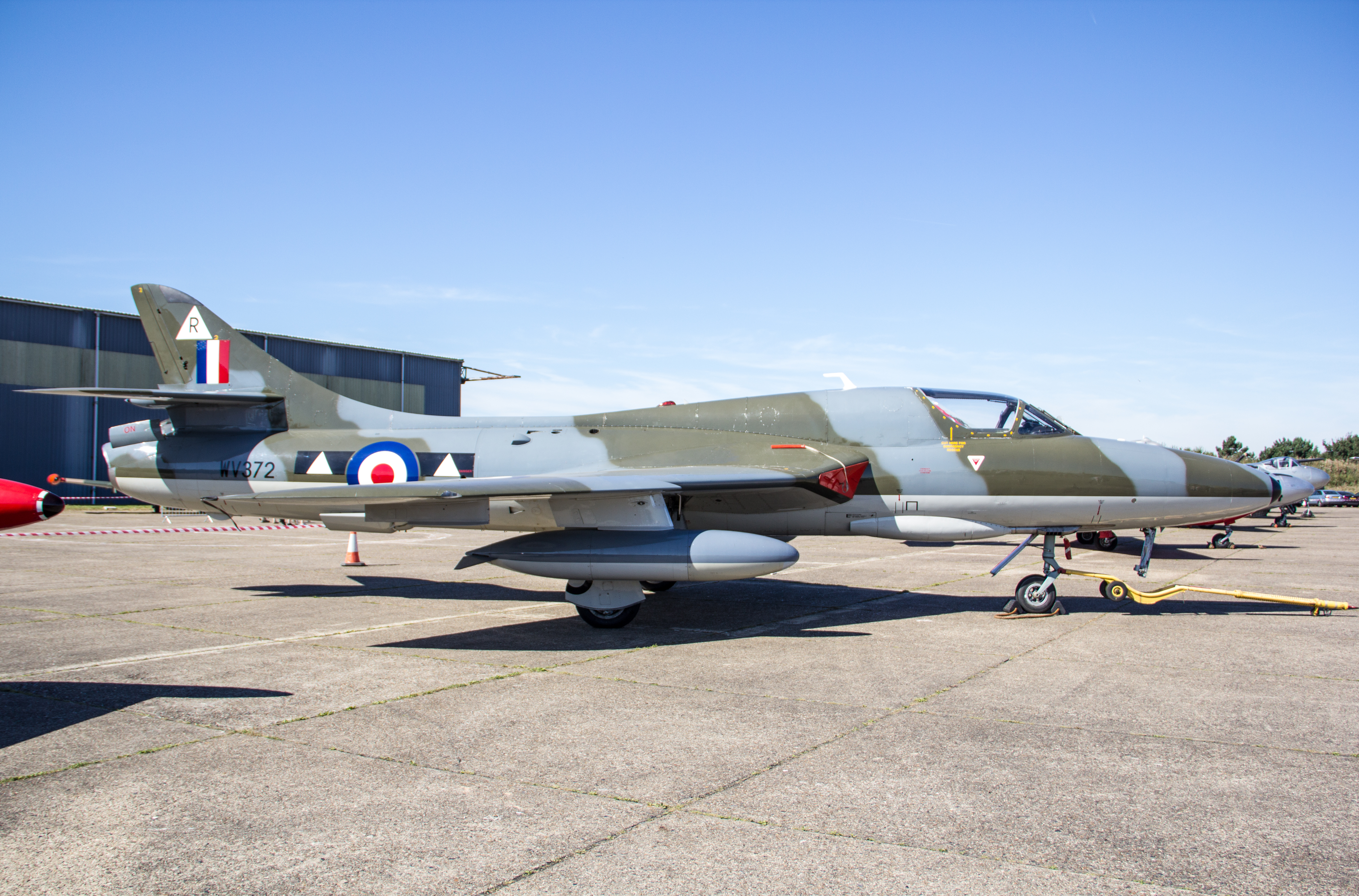
Hawker Hunter T.7 WV372 in No. II (AC) Squadron markings, 2012. (This jet was operated by the unit during the 1960s up until 1971.)

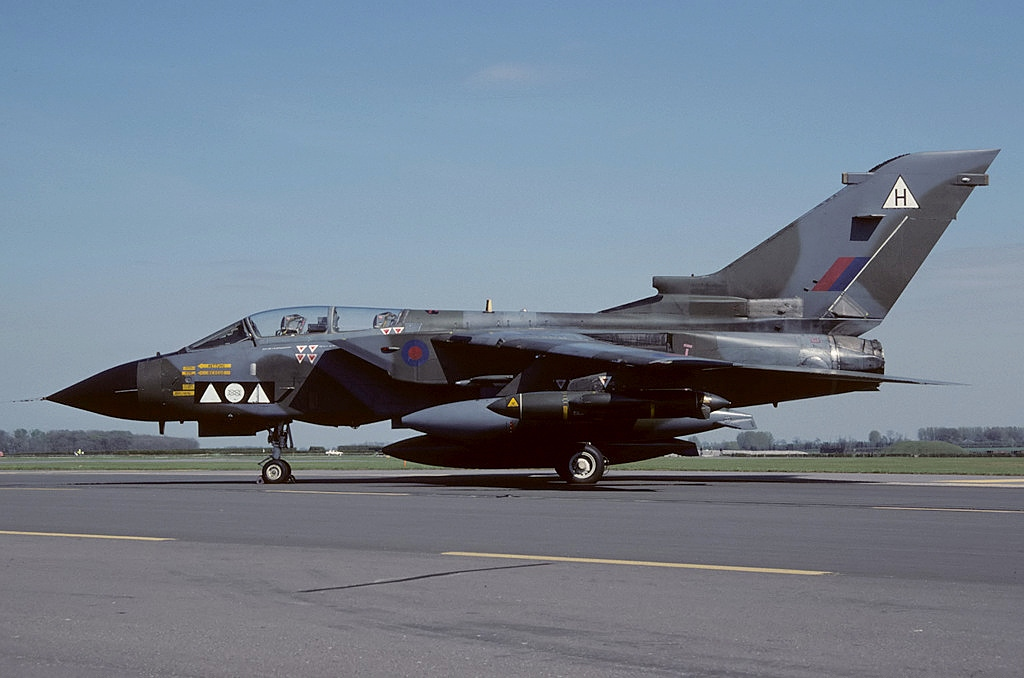
Panavia Tornado GR1A in camouflage colour scheme and No. 2 Squadron markings during 1990.

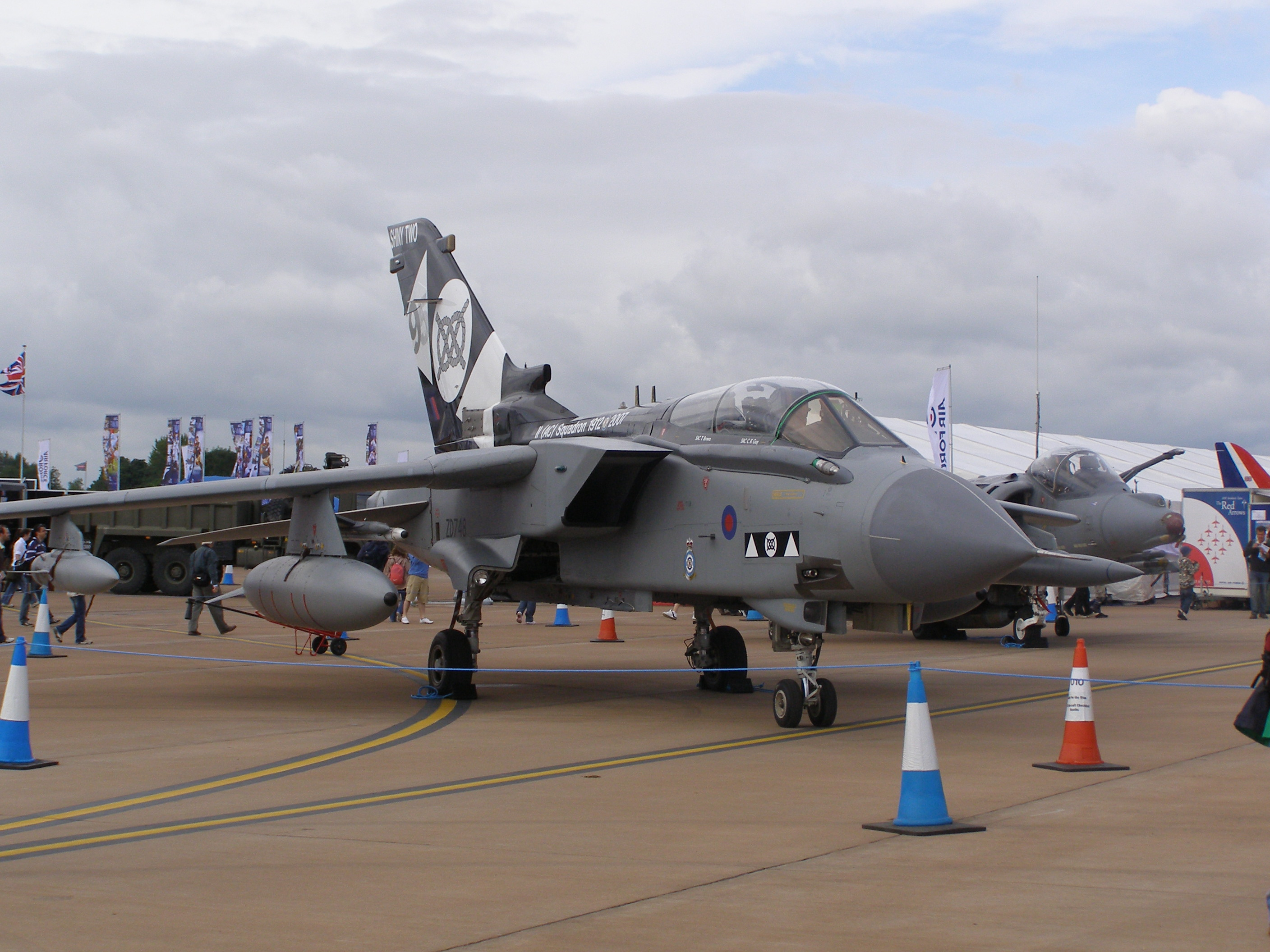
Panavia Tornado GR4 in grey colour scheme and special markings for the 95th anniversary of the squadron in 2007.

== Heritage ==
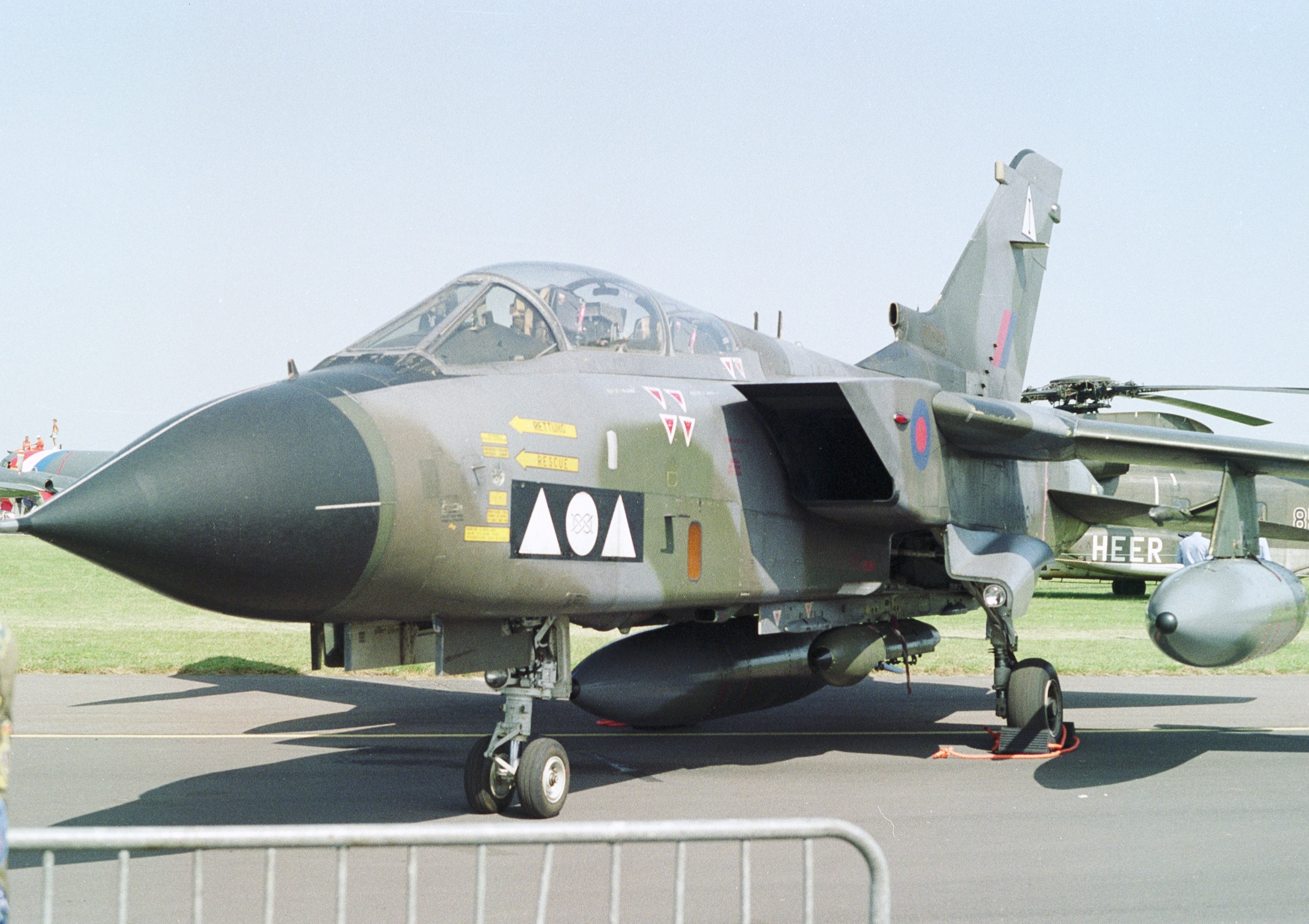
A Panavia Tornado GR1 displaying No. 2 Squadron markings in 1992

=== Badge and motto ===
The squadron's badge features the RAF roundel (three concentric circles) over a wake knot.It was approved by King Edward VIII in May 1936. The circles represent the RAF and the wake knot is derived from the coat of arms of Anglo-Saxon nobleman Hereward the Wake who defended the Isle of Ely during the 11th century Norman Conquest. The badge indicates the basic role of the squadron as a guardian of the army.

The squadron has two mottos, the first 'Hereward – Guardian of the Army', reflects the unit's historic army cooperation role. The second motto is 'second to none'.

=== Markings ===
The squadron's aircraft were first painted with black triangles in 1916, as a method of identification for friendly ground forces. The triangle was then incorporated into the squadron's aircraft markings.

=== Call signs ===
As of March 2025, aircraft operated by No. 2 Squadron use the following peacetime air traffic control call signs within UK airspace: Bayonet, Blizzard, Chieftain, Spartan and Vampire.

== Battle honours ==
No. 2 Squadron has received the following battle honours. Those marked with an asterisk (*) may be emblazoned on the squadron standard.

- Western Front (1914–1918)*
- Mons (1914)*
- Neuve Chapelle (1915)*
- Loos (1915)*
- Somme (1916)*
- Arras (1917)*
- Somme (1918)
- Lys (1918)
- France and Low Countries (1939–1940)*
- Dunkirk (1940)*
- Fortress Europe (1941–1944)*
- Normandy (1944)*
- Arnhem (1944)*
- Walchern (1944)*
- Rhine (1944)*
- France and Germany (1944–1945)
- Gulf (1991)*
- Iraq (2003)*
- Libya (2011)*

== Commanders ==
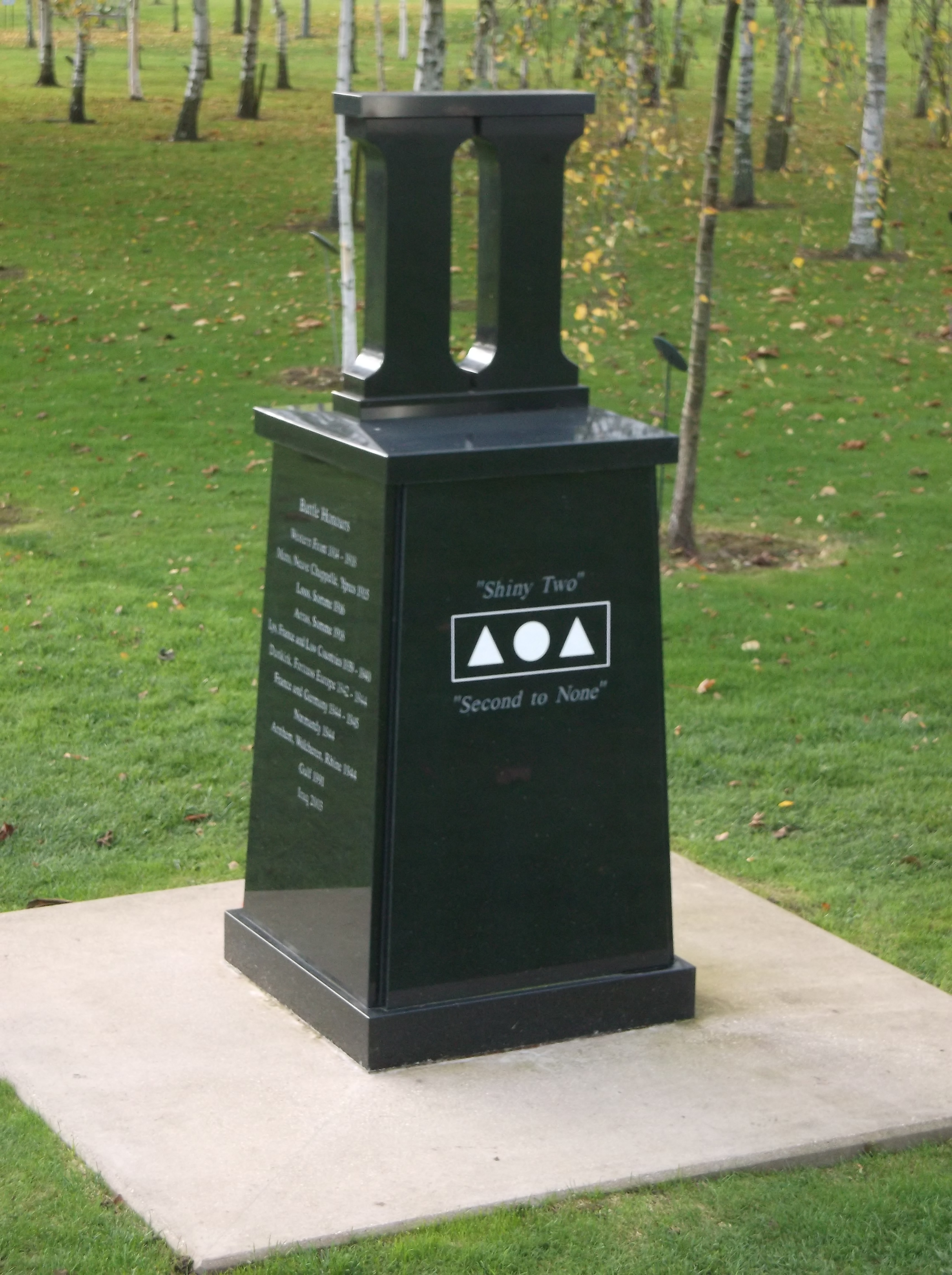
No. 2 Squadron memorial, National Memorial Arboretum

List of commanding officers of No. 2 Squadron, including date of appointment.

- Major C J Burke (13 May 1912)
- Major G W P Dawes (10 November 1914)
- Major T I Webb-Bowen (8 March 1915)
- Major J H W Becke (2 June 1915)
- Major C F de S.Murphy (3 November 1915)
- Major R A Cooper (9 April 1916)
- Major W R Snow (16 August 1917)
- Major P G Ross-Hume (28 August 1918)
- Squadron Leader B F More (12 November 1919)
- Squadron Leader F W Stent (18 June 1920)
- Squadron Leader A J Butler (16 August 1920)
- Squadron Leader L F Forbes (15 May 1922)
- Squadron Leader R E Saul (15 April 1925)
- Squadron Leader W Sowrey (9 January 1927)
- Squadron Leader H M Probyn (1 April 1928)
- Squadron Leader S E Toomer (29 September 1930)
- Squadron Leader P F Fullard (12 January 1933)
- Squadron Leader J H Green (1 December 1933)
- Squadron Leader N L Despoer (20 July 1935)
- Squadron Leader W A Opie (21 April 1938)
- Squadron Leader A J W Geddes (29 April 1939) (Wing Commander from 1 March 1940)
- Wing CommanderP J A Riddell (24 December 1941)
- Wing Commander P W Stansfeld (8 February 1943)
- Squadron Leader B O C Egan-Wyer (29 June 1943)
- Squadron Leader M J Gray (25 August 1943)
- Squadron Leader C A Maitland (7 September 1944)
- Squadron Leader R J F Mitchell (25 March 1945)
- Squadron Leader D W Barlow (24 April 1946)
- Squadron Leader G Collinson (15 December 1946)
- Squadron Leader W A Newenham (28 October 1948)
- Squadron Leader L H Bartlett (6 February 1950)
- Squadron Leader R M Pugh AFC (1 November 1950)
- Squadron Leader R H G Weighill (29 May 1953)
- Flight Lieutenant M C Newman (31 August 1955)
- Squadron Leader R S Mortley (15 November 1955)
- Squadron Leader C A Wade (12 May 1958)
- Squadron Leader C S MacDonald (16 September 1960)
- Squadron Leader D L F Thornton (15 February 1962)
- Squadron Leader N J R Walpole (13 December 1964)
- Squadron Leader T Barrett (16 June 1967)
- Squadron Leader R J M David (11 November 1969)
- Wing Commander B A Stead (7 December 1971)
- Wing Commander D H Warren (2 December 1972)
- Wing Commander D C Ferguson (8 May 1975)
- Wing Commander R A F Wilson (1 April 1976)
- Wing Commander R Fowler (6 January 1978)
- Wing Commander T G Thorn AFC (4 May 1980)
- Wing Commander F J Hoare AFC (18 January 1983)
- Wing Commander G E Stirrup (31 May 1985)
- Wing Commander Phillip O Sturley (13 March 1987)
- Wing Commander A Threadgould (1 January 1989)
- Wing Commander B C Holding (1 July 1991)
- Wing Commander R J Hounslow (21 July 1993)
- Wing Commander Chris M Nickols (6 December 1993)
- Wing Commander Richard F Garwood (26 April 1996)
- Wing Commander Steve J Hillier (27 November 1998)
- Wing Commander R M Poole (15 September 2000)
- Wing Commander S Cockram (2 May 2003)
- Wing Commander A Hine (25 September 2005)
- Wing Commander J Turner (19 May 2008)
- Wing Commander N A Tucker-Lowe (January 2011)
- Wing Commander J D Holmes (January 2013)
- Wing Commander Roger G Elliott (9 January 2015)
- Wing Commander Jim Lee (January 2017)

== See also ==
- Armed forces in Scotland
- List of Royal Air Force aircraft squadrons
- Military history of Scotland
