= Throwley Priory =

English priory south of Faversham in Kent

Coordinates: 51°16′0″N 0°51′25″E

Throwley Priory was an English priory south of Faversham in Kent.

== History ==
At the end of the civil wars of 1139-53, King Stephen's chief lieutenant William of Ypres gave the churches of Throwley and Chilham to the Abbey of Saint Bertin in Saint-Omer, France. The priory at Throwley was built as a cell of that Benedictine house. It was dissolved as part of Henry IV's general suppression of alien priories in 1414 and granted to Thomas Beaufort, the half-brother of the king's father. Beaufort gave Throwley to Syon Abbey on 13 July 1424, a gift confirmed by Henry VI in 1443.

== Description ==
The priory was located east of Throwley church. The site was later used for the parsonage. English Heritage say that no remains are visible, although Hasted claims that some foundations and flint walls were incorporated into a building behind the parsonage, presumably referring to Glebe Cottage.

== Priors ==
- Peter, occurs 1297
- Walter le Blok, occurs 1326
- Giles de Ardenburgh, occurs 1356
- Bartholomew, occurs 1370
