= Arthur William Hammond =

English World War I flying ace

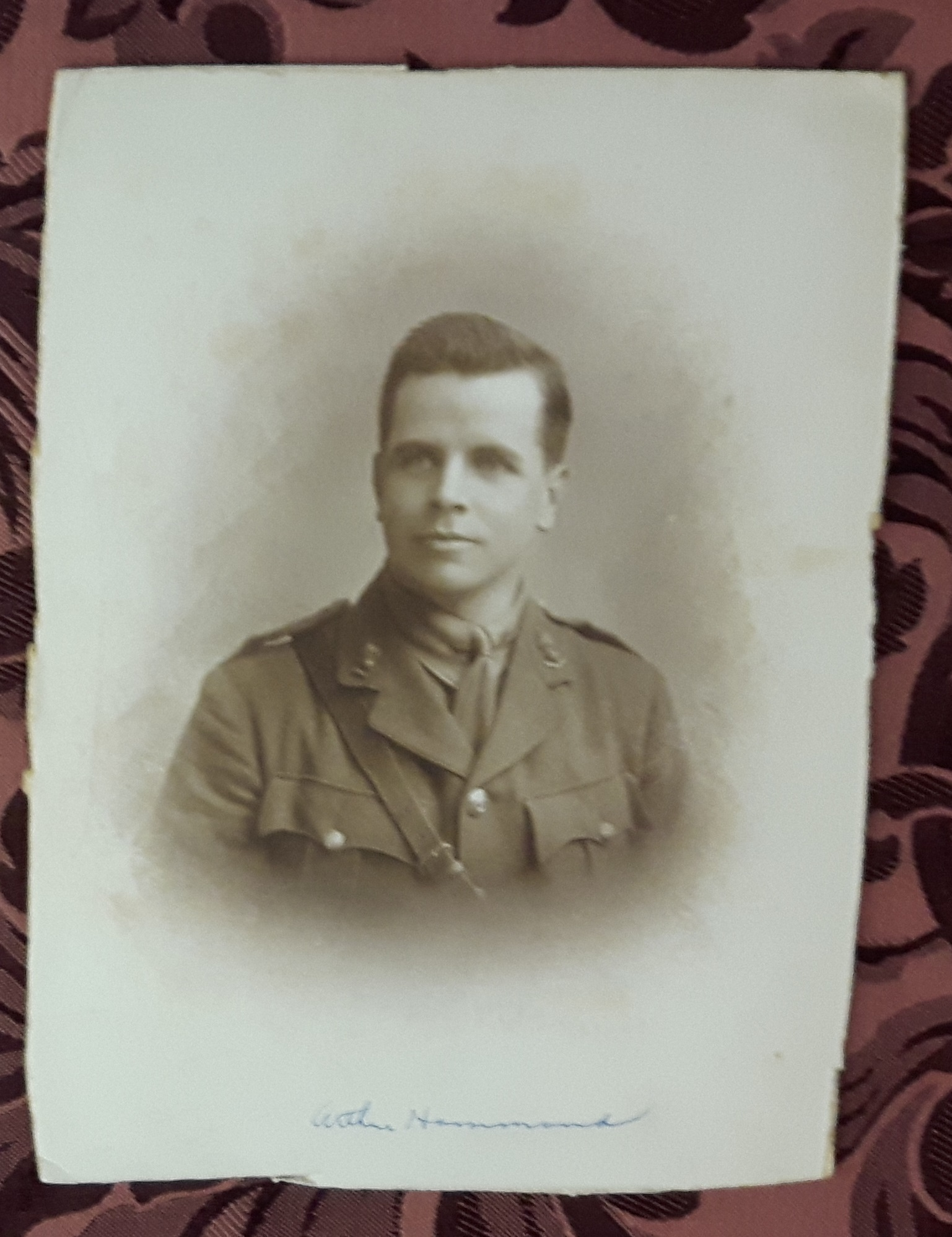
- Arthur William Hammond while serving with the Engineers
- Born: 29 August 1890; Burton Upon Trent, Staffordshire, England
- Died: 22 December 1959 (aged 69); Victoria, British Columbia, Canada
- Military career
- Allegiance: United Kingdom
- Branch: Royal Horse Guards, Royal Engineers; Royal Flying Corps; Royal Air Force; Royal Canadian Air Force
- Rank: Lieutenant
- Unit: No. 2 Squadron RFC
- Awards: Military Cross with Bar

Lieutenant Arthur William Hammond was an English World War I flying ace credited with five aerial victories as an observer/gunner.

== Early life ==
Hammond was born on 29 August 1890 in Walton-on-the-Hill, Lancashire, England. He was the son of Henry and Alice (née Kincaid) Hammond, his father was a Master Mariner.

== Military life ==
Hammond joined the Royal Horse Guards as a trooper. In October 1915, he was commissioned as a Temporary Second Lieutenant in the Royal Engineers before transferring to the Royal Flying Corps (RFC) as an observer. Flying with 2 Squadron RFC he was credited with five victories as an observer/gunner flying the Armstrong Whitworth F.K.8 biplane. The pilot mentioned in his second Military Cross citation was Alan Arnett McLeod, who was awarded the Victoria Cross for the same action. Hammond lost a leg due to his wounds and left the RFC.

== Later life ==
At the end of the war, he emigrated to Canada at the invitation of the family of Alan McLeod. He landed in Stonewall, Manitoba and worked as a road engineer for a year. He then moved to Winnipeg and began a long career with the Great West Life Company. In the Second World War, he served as an adjutant in the Royal Canadian Air Force.

Arthur Hammond was married twice – first to Nellie Grant of Winnipeg in 1927 and later in life as a widower to longtime friend Dorothy Wardrop (née Williams) in 1956. On retirement in 1946 he moved to Victoria, BC. He died in Victoria, British Columbia, on 22 December 1959, aged 69.

== Honours and awards ==
- 22 April 1918 – T/Lt Arthur William Hammond, RE, attached to the Royal Flying Corps is awarded the Military Cross:

For conspicuous gallantry and devotion to duty. When acting as observer on photographic work, though his machine was attacked by six enemy aeroplanes, he with great coolness shot down two of these. On two later occasions a large number of hostile battery positions were photographed, engaged and successfully silenced, as well as some of our long range batteries calibrated on hostile targets. The eminently satisfactory manner in which all these tasks were accomplished is due to this officer's keenness, conscientiousness and devotion to duty.

— London Gazette

- 26 July 1918 – T/Lt Arthur William Hammond, MC, RE and RFC is awarded a bar to the Military Cross:

For conspicuous gallantry and devotion to duty in aerial fighting. Whilst attacking hostile troops at about 500 feet he was encountered by eight triplanes, which dived from all directions, firing their front guns. He fired bursts at each machine in turn, shooting three of them down out of control. He was wounded himself six times, but continued the action until his machine caught fire. The pilot, although wounded five times, with great skill and coolness managed to climb to the left hand bottom plane and controlled the machine from the side of the fuselage, side-slipping to the ground. The machine crashed in "No Man's Land," and the pilot managed to extricate him from the flames and dragged him to a shell-hole, from which they were rescued by the infantry.

— London Gazette

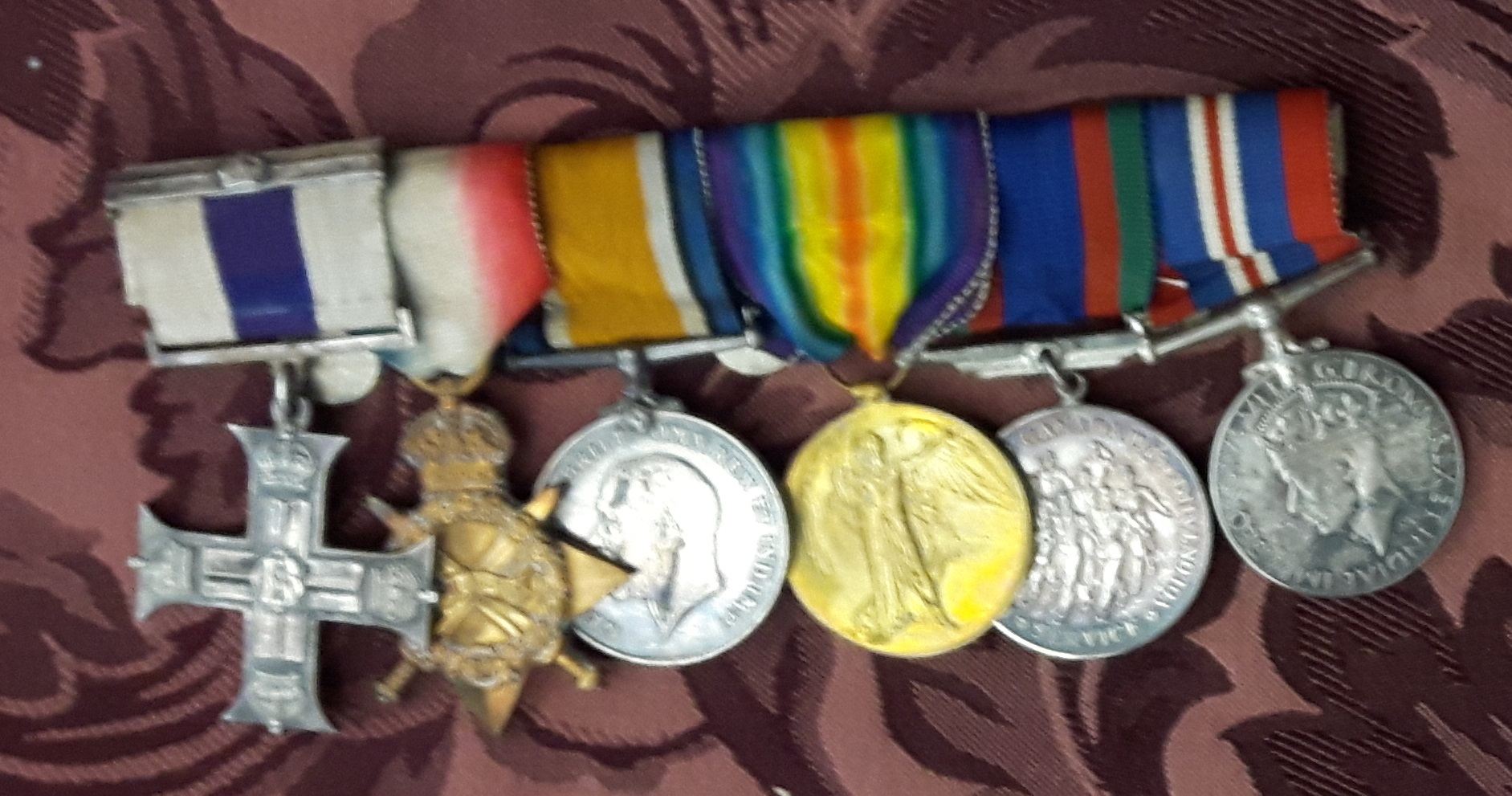
Photograph of the medals awarded to Lieutenant Arthur William Hammond during the first and second world war.

== List of aerial victories ==
See also Aerial victory standards of World War I

No.	Date/time	Aircraft	Foe	Result	Location	Notes
1	18 February 1918 @ 11:55 hours	Armstrong Whitworth F.K.8	Pfalz Scout	Destroyed	La Bassée	Hammond's pilot was Jack Manning Allport
2	18 February 1918 @ 11:55 hours	Armstrong Whitworth F.K.8	Pfalz Scout	Destroyed	La Bassée	Hammond's pilot was Jack Manning Allport
3	27 March 1918 @ 14:50 hours	Armstrong Whitworth F.K.8	Triplane	Destroyed	Albert	Hammond's pilot was A. A. McLeod
4	27 March 1918	Armstrong Whitworth F.K.8	Triplane	Destroyed	Albert	Hammond's pilot was A. A. McLeod
5	27 March 1918	Armstrong Whitworth F.K.8	Triplane	Destroyed	Albert	Hammond's pilot was A. A. McLeod
