= Armstrong Whitworth F.K.8 =

1916 utility aircraft by Armstrong Whitworth

F.K.8
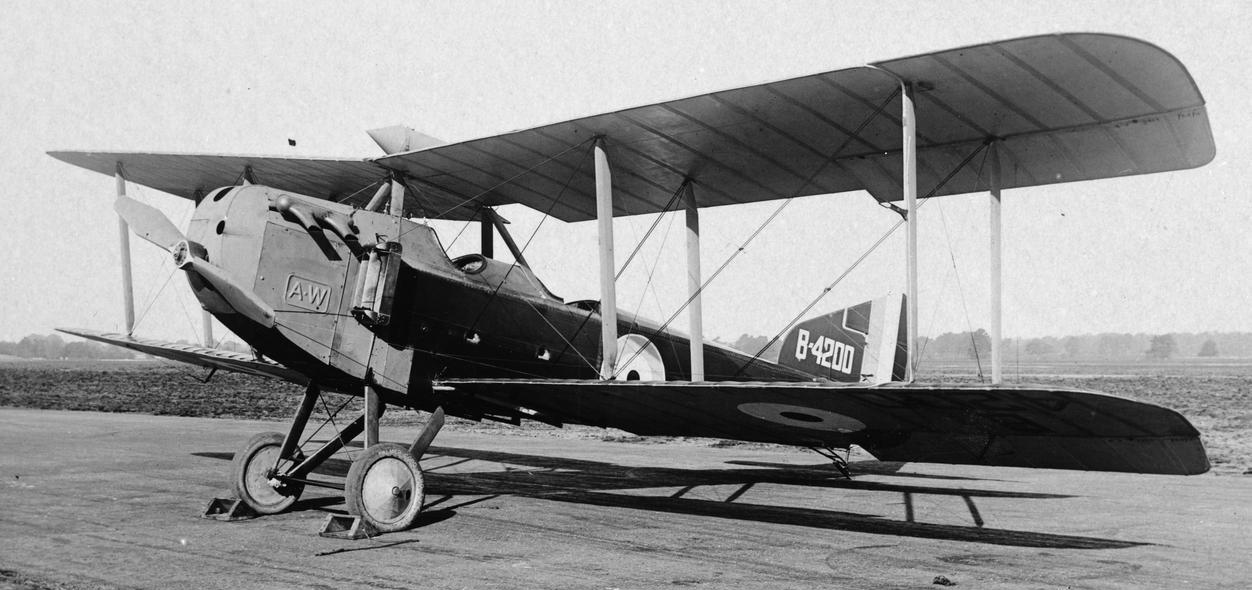
- Late Model F.K.8 with small radiators, streamlined nose, and vee-undercarriage.

General information
- Type: Bomber/Reconnaissance aircraft
- Manufacturer: Armstrong Whitworth
- Designer: Frederick Koolhoven
- Primary users: Royal Flying Corps Qantas
- Number built: 1,650

History
- First flight: May 1916
- Developed from: Armstrong Whitworth F.K.7

The Armstrong Whitworth F.K.8 was a British two-seat general-purpose biplane built by Armstrong Whitworth during the First World War. The type served alongside the better known R.E.8 until the end of the war, at which point 694 F.K.8s remained on RAF charge.

== Design and development ==
The aircraft, originally designated the F.K.7, was designed by Dutch aircraft designer Frederick Koolhoven as a replacement for the Royal Aircraft Factory B.E.2c and the Armstrong Whitworth F.K.3. It was a sturdier aircraft than the F.K.3, with a larger fuselage and wings, and was powered by a 160 hp (110 kW) Beardmore water-cooled engine. The undercarriage used oleo shock absorbers and the observer was equipped with a Scarff ring mounting for a .303 in (7.7 mm) Lewis machine gun. No armament was initially provided for the pilot. The rudder featured a long, pointed horn-balance. The type was fitted with basic dual controls for the observer to control the aircraft if the pilot became incapacitated.

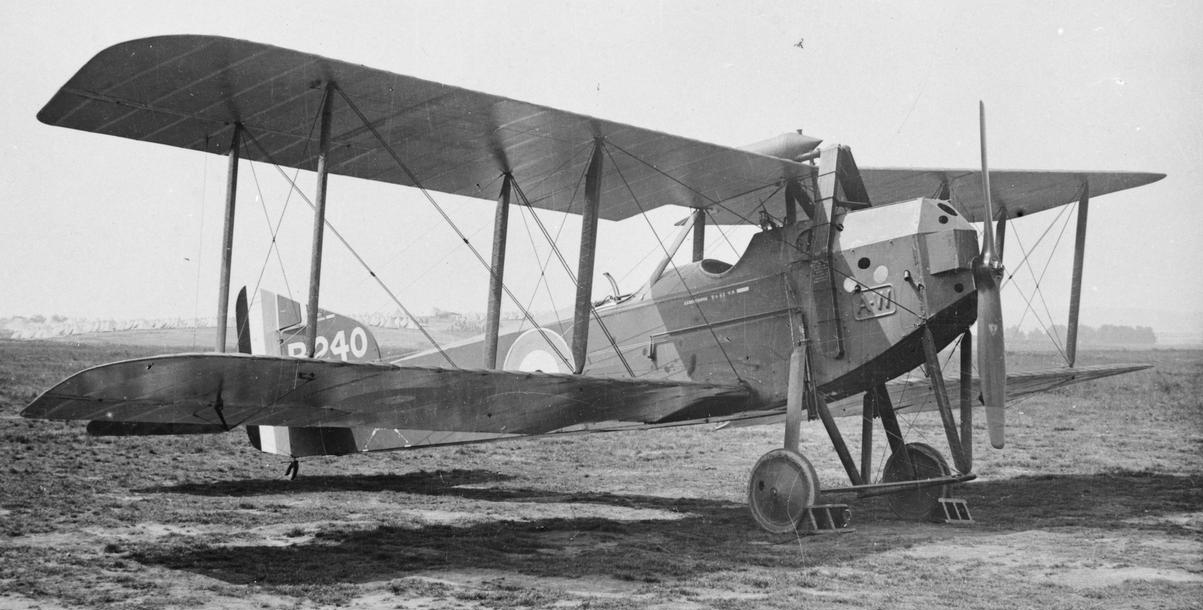
Early production F.K.8 showing original undercarriage, cowling and radiators

The first example, A411, flew in May 1916 and was delivered to the Royal Flying Corps Central Flying School at Upavon on 16 June. Because its rival, the Royal Aircraft Factory R.E.8 was an unknown quantity, it was decided that fifty of the Armstrong Whitworth design, renamed the F.K.8., would be ordered for the RFC.

The production aircraft were identical in most respects to A411, with the addition of a forward-firing .303 in (7.7 mm) Vickers machine gun to port of and slightly behind the engine. The Armstrong Whitworth gun synchronising mechanism was incomplete at the time the first example A2636 arrived in France and some early production F.K.8s may have used the Arsiad interrupter gear instead. The Armstrong Whitworth mechanism (like other early mechanical synchronising systems) proved unreliable and was later replaced by the Constantinescu gear. From the fifth production aircraft, the rudder balance was shortened and the shape of the fin was modified.

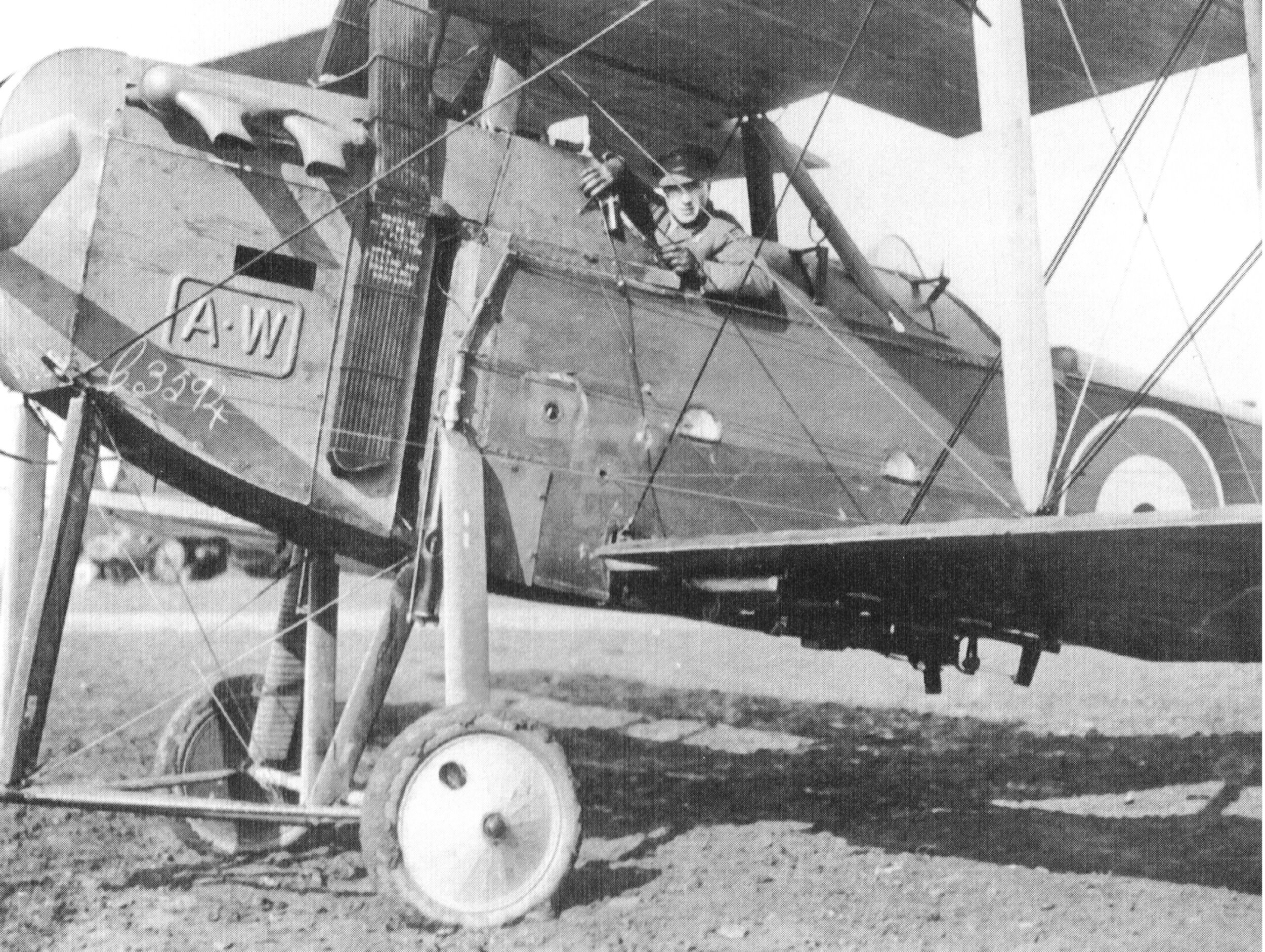
The cockpit placement of the F.K.8

The type had several teething troubles: the oleo undercarriage was unable to withstand rough use on the front line airfields, tail skids frequently broke and the original radiators blocked up quickly. Following instructions issued on 30 April 1917, some F.K.8s were refitted with simplified vee-undercarriages from Bristol F.2 Fighters. This soon led to a temporary shortage of these undercarriages and the practice had to be discontinued until May 1918, after which several F.K.8s were fitted with revised undercarriages. Most production F.K.8s had modifications to the wings, gunner's seat and the exhaust system. The tall inverted vee radiators incorporated improved tubes which reduced the blockages. On later aircraft the nose cowling was redesigned and smaller box radiators were standardised.

In service the F.K.8 (nicknamed the "Big Ack") proved to be effective and dependable, being used for reconnaissance, artillery spotting, ground-attack, contact-patrol and day and night bombing. It was reputedly easier to fly than the R.E.8 and was sturdier but its performance was even more pedestrian and it shared the inherent stability of the Royal Aircraft Factory types. While the pilot and observer were placed reasonably close together, communication between the two lacked the "tap on the shoulder" intimacy of the Bristol Fighter (or the R.E.8 for that matter).

The F.K.13 seems to have been the name of a reconnaissance version of the F.K.8 but it may have been no more than a project. A total of 1,650 of the standard F.K.8 were built.

== Operational history ==
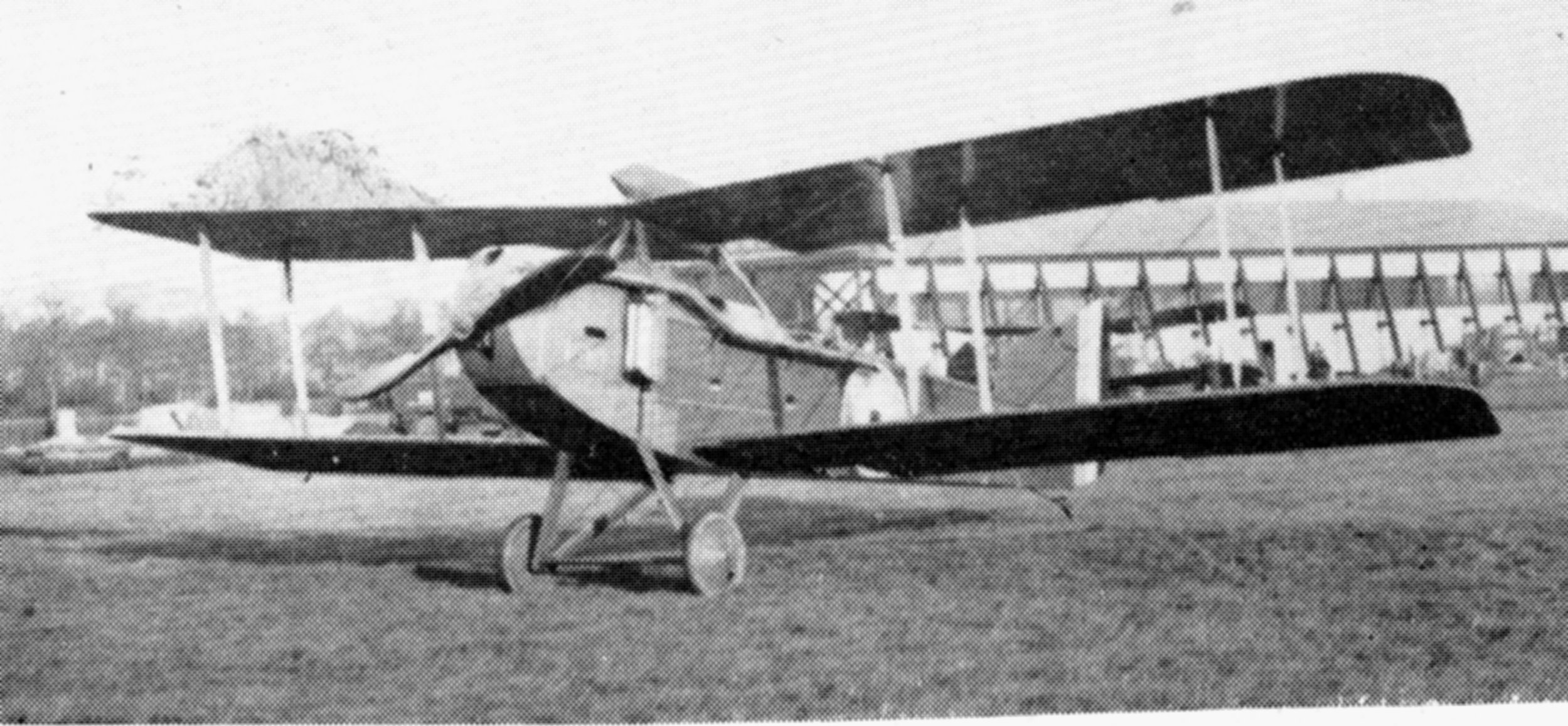
Late production F.K.8 showing modified undercarriage, cowling, and radiators, as well as the final long exhausts

The first squadron to take the type to France was 35 Squadron RFC, in January 1917. The type eventually served with several squadrons on operations in France, Macedonia, Palestine and for home defence, proving more popular in service than its better known contemporary the R.E.8. The F.K.8 was principally used for corps reconnaissance but was also used for light bombing, being capable of carrying up to six 40 lb (20 kg) phosphorus smoke bombs, up to four 65 lb (29 kg) bombs or two 112 lb (51 kg) bombs on underwing racks.

Two Victoria Crosses were won by pilots of F.K.8s; one by Second Lieutenant Alan Arnett McLeod of No. 2 Squadron RFC, on 27 March 1918 and the second by Captain Ferdinand Maurice Felix West of No. 8 Squadron RAF on 10 August 1918.

In 1918 operators in aircraft Nos. 5082 & 5117, under the charge of Captain Tate, R.A.F., controlled unmanned boats by radio through obstacles in trials at Dover.

With the R.E.8, the F.K.8 was scheduled to be replaced for corps reconnaissance by a version of the Bristol Fighter with a Sunbeam Arab engine. Unfortunately the engine was unsatisfactory and this version of the Bristol never saw service. Like the R.E.8, the F.K.8 was quickly discarded with the end of the war – the last squadron, No. 150 Squadron RAF, being disbanded at Kirec in Greece on 18 September 1919.

One F.K.8 was purchased by a pilot named Sydney Stewart in the early 1920s, who took the aircraft to Buenos Aires and gave flying lessons. There he met Francisco Cusmanich, a Paraguayan pilot. Stewart and Cusmanich offered their services to the Paraguayan government during the Revolution of 1922. The F.K.8 was taken to Paraguay by ship and called "Presidente Ayala" in honor of the President of Paraguay, Dr. Eusebio Ayala. Both pilots flew several reconnaissance and light bombing sorties over the rebel positions. In one of those sorties, the F.K.8 was hit several times with ground fire causing an explosion on board, killing Stewart and Cusmanich instantly.

== Civil service ==
Eight aircraft were civil-registered after the war with two aircraft being used in Australia by the Queensland and Northern Territory Aerial Services (later QANTAS, then Qantas Airways Ltd.).

== Operators ==
=== Civil operators ===
Australia

- QANTAS

=== Military operators ===
Kingdom of Hejaz

- Hejaz Air Force – The Kingdom of Hejaz received two F.K.8s in 1921, at least one remaining in existence until 1923.

Paraguay

- Paraguayan Army

United Kingdom

- Royal Flying Corps / Royal Air Force

Western Front:

  - 2 Squadron RFC
  - 8 Squadron RFC
  - 10 Squadron RFC
  - 35 Squadron RFC
  - 82 Squadron RFC
  - Headquarters Communication Squadron RFC

Home Defence:

  - 36 Squadron RFC
  - 39 Squadron RFC
  - 50 Squadron RFC

Macedonia:

  - 17 Squadron RFC (part)
  - 47 Squadron RFC (part)

Palestine:

  - 142 Squadron RFC

Training:

  - 3 Training Squadron RFC
  - 15 Training Squadron RFC
  - 31 Training Squadron RFC
  - 39 Training Squadron RFC
  - 50 Training Squadron RFC
  - 57 Training Squadron RFC
  - 61 Training Squadron RFC
  - 110 Training Squadron RFC
  - 127 Training Squadron RFC
  - 1 Training Depot Station RFC

== Specifications (F.K.8) ==
Data from Armstrong Whitworth Aircraft since 1913

General characteristics

- Crew: 2
- Length: 31 ft 5 in (9.58 m)
- Wingspan: 43 ft 6 in (13.26 m)
- Height: 10 ft 11 in (3.33 m)
- Wing area: 540 sq ft (50 m^{2})
- Empty weight: 1,916 lb (869 kg)
- Gross weight: 2,811 lb (1,275 kg)
- Fuel capacity: 50 imp gal (60 US gal; 230 L)
- Powerplant: 1 × Beardmore 160 hp water-cooled six-cylinder inline engine

Performance

- Maximum speed: 95 mph (153 km/h, 83 kn) at sea level
- Endurance: 3 hr
- Service ceiling: 13,000 ft (4,000 m)
- Time to altitude: 15.4 min to 6,500 ft (2,000 m)

Armament

- Guns: 1 × fixed, forward firing .303 in Vickers machine gun and 1 × flexibly mounted .303 in Lewis gun
- Bombs: up to 260 lb (118 kg) bombs

== See also ==
Related development

- Armstrong Whitworth F.K.3

Aircraft of comparable role, configuration, and era

- Breguet 14
- Royal Aircraft Factory B.E.2
- Royal Aircraft Factory R.E.8
- Rumpler C.I

== Bibliography ==
- Andersson, Lennart (July–August 2004). "Wings Over the Desert: Aviation on the Arabian Peninsula: Part One Saudi Arabia". Air Enthusiast. No. 112. pp. 39–43. ISSN 0143-5450.
- Bruce, J. M. (1982). The Aeroplanes of the Royal Flying Corps (Military Wing). London: Putnam and Company. ISBN 0-370-30084-X.
- Hagedorn, Dan; Sapienza, Anonio L. (1997). Aircraft of the Chaco War 1928–1935. Algen, Pennsylvania, USA: Schiffer Publishing. ISBN 0-7643-0146-2.
- Mason, Francis K. (1994). The British Bomber Since 1914. London: Putnam Aeronautical Books. ISBN 0-85177-861-5.
- Munson, Kenneth (1967). Aircraft of World War I. London: Ian Allan. ISBN 0-7110-0356-4.
- Tapper, Oliver (1988). Armstrong Whitworth Aircraft since 1913. London: Putnam. ISBN 0-85177-826-7.
