= Richard Williams (RAAF officer) =

Royal Australian Air Force chief

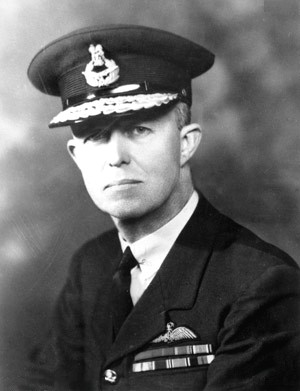
- Air Marshal Sir Richard Williams
- Born: 3 August 1890; Moonta Mines, South Australia
- Died: 7 February 1980 (aged 89); Melbourne
- Military career
- Allegiance: Australia
- Branch: Royal Australian Air Force
- Service years: 1909–46
- Rank: Air Marshal
- Nickname: "Dicky"
- Commands: No. 1 Squadron AFC (1917–18); 40th Wing RAF (1918–19); Chief of the Air Staff (1922, 1925–32, 1934–39); RAAF Overseas HQ (1941–42)
- Conflicts: World War I; Middle Eastern Theatre; World War II; European Theatre
- Awards: Knight Commander of the Order of the British Empire; Companion of the Order of the Bath; Distinguished Service Order; Mentioned in Despatches (2); Order of the Nahda (Hejaz)
- Other work: Director-General Civil Aviation (1946–55)

Air Marshal Sir Richard Williams, KBE, CB, DSO (3 August 1890 – 7 February 1980) is widely regarded as the "father" of the Royal Australian Air Force (RAAF). He was the first military pilot trained in Australia, and went on to command Australian and British fighter units in World War I. A proponent for air power independent of other branches of the armed services, Williams played a leading role in the establishment of the RAAF and became its first Chief of the Air Staff (CAS) in 1922. He served as CAS for thirteen years over three terms, longer than any other officer.

Williams came from a working-class background in South Australia. He was a lieutenant in the Army when he learned to fly at Point Cook, Victoria, in 1914. As a pilot with the Australian Flying Corps (AFC) in World War I, Williams rose to command No. 1 Squadron AFC, and later 40th Wing RAF. He was awarded the Distinguished Service Order and finished the war a lieutenant colonel. Afterwards he campaigned for an Australian air force run separately to the Army and Navy, which came into being on 31 March 1921.

The fledgling RAAF faced several challenges to its continued existence in the 1920s and early 1930s, and Williams received much of the credit for maintaining its independence, but an adverse report on flying safety standards saw him dismissed from the position of CAS and seconded to the RAF prior to World War II. Despite some support for his reinstatement as Air Force chief, and promotion to air marshal in 1940, he never again led the RAAF. After the war he was forcibly retired along with other World War I veteran officers. He took up the position of Director-General of Civil Aviation in Australia, and was knighted the year before his retirement in 1955.

== Early life and career ==
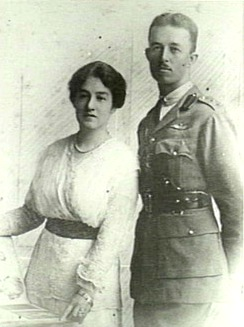
Richard and Constance Williams, c. 1915

Williams was born on 3 August 1890 into a working-class family in Moonta Mines, South Australia. He was the eldest son of Richard Williams, a copper miner who had emigrated from Cornwall, England, and his wife Emily. Leaving Moonta Public School at junior secondary level, Williams worked as a telegraph messenger and later as a bank clerk. He enlisted in a militia unit, the South Australian Infantry Regiment, in 1909 at the age of nineteen. Commissioned a second lieutenant on 8 March 1911, he joined the Permanent Military Forces the following year.

In August 1914, Lieutenant Williams took part in Australia's inaugural military flying course at Central Flying School, run by Lieutenants Henry Petre and Eric Harrison. After soloing in a Bristol Boxkite around the airfield at Point Cook, Victoria, Williams became the first student to graduate as a pilot, on 12 November 1914. He recalled the school as a "ragtime show" consisting of a paddock, tents, and one large structure: a shed for the Boxkite. Following an administrative and instructional posting, Williams underwent advanced flying training at Point Cook in July 1915. The next month he married Constance Esther Griffiths, who was thirteen years his senior. The couple had no children.

== World War I ==
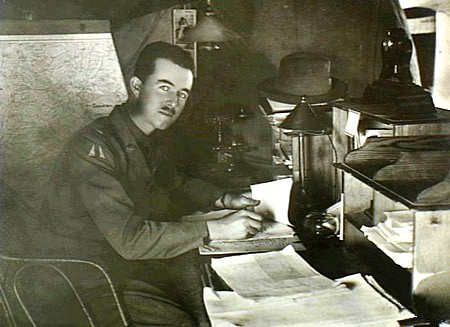
Major Williams as Commanding Officer of No. 1 Squadron AFC, Palestine, 1917

Williams was promoted captain on 5 January 1916. He was appointed a flight commander in No. 1 Squadron Australian Flying Corps (AFC), which was initially numbered 67 Squadron Royal Flying Corps by the British. The unit departed Australia in March 1916 without any aircraft; after arriving in Egypt it received B.E.2 fighters, a type deficient in speed and manoeuvrability, and which lacked forward-firing machine guns. Williams wrote that in combat with the German Fokkers, "our fighting in the air was of short duration but could mean a quick end", and that when it came to bombing, he and his fellow pilots "depended mainly on luck". He further quoted a truism in the Flying Corps that "if a new pilot got through his first three days without being shot down he was lucky; if he got through three weeks he was doing well and if he got through three months he was set". Williams and the other Australians were initially involved in isolated tasks around the Suez Canal, attached to Royal Flying Corps (RFC) units. No. 1 Squadron began to operate concertedly in December 1916, supporting the Allied advance on Palestine. Williams completed his RFC attachment in February 1917.

On 5 March 1917, shortly after commencing operations with No. 1 Squadron, Williams narrowly avoided crash-landing when his engine stopped while he was bombing the railway terminus at Tel el Sheria. At first believing that he had been struck by enemy fire, he found that the engine switch outside his cockpit had turned off. Within 500 feet of the ground he was able to switch the engine back on and return to base. On 21 April, Williams landed behind enemy lines to rescue downed comrade Lieutenant Adrian Cole, having the day before pressed home an attack on Turkish cavalry while under "intense anti-aircraft fire"; these two actions earned him the Distinguished Service Order, the citation for which reads:

For conspicuous gallantry and devotion to duty. Flying at a low altitude under intense anti-aircraft fire, he attacked and dispersed enemy troops who were concentrating on our flank. On another occasion, whilst on a reconnaissance, he landed in the enemy's lines, and rescued a pilot of a machine which had been brought down by hostile fire.

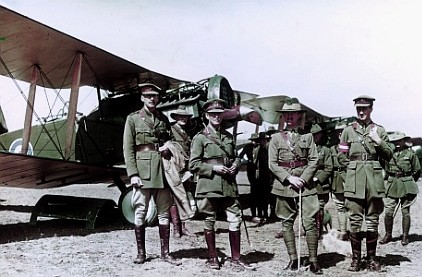
Lieutenant General Sir Harry Chauvel (front, second left) and Lieutenant Colonel Williams (front, second right) with No. 1 Squadron Bristol Fighters, February 1918

He was promoted major in May and given command of No. 1 Squadron, which was re-equipped with Bristol Fighters later that year. "Now for the first time", wrote Williams, "after 17 months in the field we had aircraft with which we could deal with our enemy in the air." His men knew him as a teetotaller and non-smoker, whose idea of swearing was an occasional "Darn me!"

In June 1918, Williams was made a brevet lieutenant colonel and commander of the RAF's 40th (Army) Wing, which was operating in Palestine. It comprised his former No. 1 Squadron and three British units. As a Dominion officer, Williams found that he was not permitted to "exercise powers of punishment over British personnel", leading to him being temporarily "granted a supplementary commission in the Royal Air Force". Augmented by a giant Handley Page bomber, his forces took part in the Battle of Armageddon, the final offensive in Palestine, where they inflicted "wholesale destruction" on Turkish columns. Of 40th Wing's actions at Wadi Fara on 21 September 1918, Williams wrote: "The Turkish Seventh Army ceased to exist and it must be noted that this was entirely the result of attack from the air." He also sent Captain Ross Smith in the Handley Page, accompanied by two Bristol Fighters, to aid Major T. E. Lawrence's Arab army north of Amman when it was harassed by German aircraft operating from Deraa. In November, Williams was appointed temporary commander of the Palestine Brigade, which comprised his previous command, the 40th (Army) Wing, and 5th (Corps) Wing. His service in the theatre later saw him awarded the Order of the Nahda by the King of the Hejaz. Twice mentioned in despatches, by the end of the war Williams had established himself, according to Air Force historian Alan Stephens, as "the AFC's rising star".

== Inter-war years ==
=== Birth of the Royal Australian Air Force ===
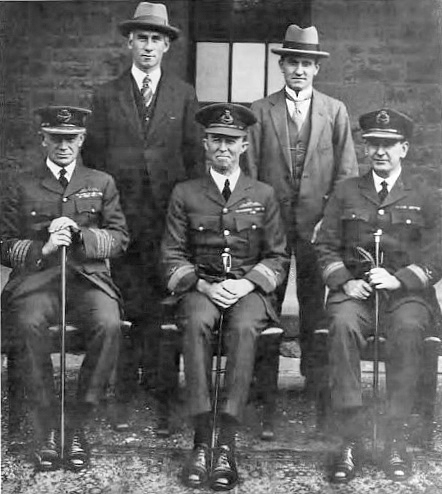
The inaugural RAAF Air Board, with Air Commodore Williams (front row, centre) as Chief of the Air Staff, and Group Captain Stanley Goble (front row, left)

Appointed an Officer of the Order of the British Empire in the 1919 New Year Honours, Williams served as Staff Officer, Aviation, at Australian Imperial Force (AIF) headquarters in London, before returning to Australia and taking up the position of Director of Air Services at Army Headquarters, Melbourne. The Australian Flying Corps had meanwhile been disbanded and replaced by the Australian Air Corps (AAC) which was, like the AFC, a branch of the Army.

Upon establishment of the Australian Air Board on 9 November 1920, Williams and his fellow AAC officers dropped their army ranks in favour of those based on the Royal Air Force. Williams, now a wing commander, personally compiled and tabled the Air Board's submissions to create the Australian Air Force (AAF), a service independent of both the Army and the Royal Australian Navy. Though the heads of the Army and Navy opposed the creation of an independent air arm for fear that they would be unable to find air cover for their operations, support from Prime Minister Billy Hughes, as well as prominent parliamentary figures including Treasurer Joseph Cook and Defence Minister George Pearce allowed the proposal to succeed. The AAF was duly formed on 31 March 1921; Williams deliberately chose this day rather than 1 April, the founding date of the RAF three years earlier, "to prevent nasty people referring to us as 'April Fools'". The "Royal" prefix was added five months later. Williams proposed an ensign for the AAF in July 1921, based on the Royal Air Force flag but featuring the five stars of the Southern Cross within the RAF roundel and the Commonwealth Star in the lower hoist quarter. This design was not adopted for the RAAF, the government employing instead a direct copy of the RAF ensign until 1949, when a new design using the stars of the Australian flag was chosen.

As the senior officer of the Air Board, Williams held the title of First Air Member, the nascent Air Force initially not being deemed suitable for a "Chief of Staff" appointment equivalent to the Army and Navy. He moved to consolidate the new service's position by expanding its assets and training. Shortly after the AAF's establishment, land was purchased for an air base at Laverton, eight kilometres (five miles) inland of Point Cook, and in July 1921 Williams made the initial proposal to develop a base at Richmond, New South Wales, the first outside Victoria. He also started a program to second students from the Army and Navy, including graduates of the Royal Military College, Duntroon, to bolster officer numbers; candidates reaped by this scheme included future Air Force chiefs John McCauley, Frederick Scherger, Valston Hancock and Alister Murdoch, along with other senior identities such as Joe Hewitt and Frank Bladin. As a leader, Williams would gain a reputation for strong will, absorption in administrative minutiae and, in Alan Stephens's words, a "somewhat puritanical" nature. He became known throughout the service as "Dicky".

=== Chief of the Air Staff ===
The position of First Air Member was replaced by Chief of the Air Staff (CAS) in October 1922. Williams would serve as CAS three times over seventeen years in the 1920s and '30s, alternating with Wing Commander (later Air Vice Marshal) Stanley Goble. One motive suggested for the rotation was a ploy by Army and Navy interests to "curb Williams' independence". Instead the arrangement "almost inevitably fostered an unproductive rivalry" between the two officers. Although in a legal sense the Air Board was responsible for the RAAF rather than the Chief of Staff alone, Williams dominated the board to such an extent that Goble would later complain that his colleague appeared to consider the Air Force his personal command.

Williams spent much of 1923 in England, attending the British Army Staff College in Camberley and RAF Staff College, Andover, followed by further study in Canada and the United States the following year. Goble served as Chief of the Air Staff in his absence. Shortly after his return in February 1925, Williams scuppered a plan by Goble to establish a small seaplane base at Rushcutters Bay in Sydney, instead organising purchase of Supermarine Seagulls, the RAAF's first amphibious aircraft, to be based at Richmond. He was promoted to group captain in July and later that year drafted a major air warfare study, "Memorandum Regarding the Air Defence of Australia". Considered prescient in many ways, it treated World War I ally Japan as Australia's main military threat, and advocated inter-service co-operation while maintaining that none of the armed forces was "purely auxiliary to another". Its concepts continue to influence RAAF strategy.

In 1926, Williams mandated the use of parachutes for all RAAF aircrew. He had visited the Irvin Air Chute Company while in the US during 1924 and recommended purchase at the time, but a backlog of orders for the RAF meant that the Australian equipment took almost two years to arrive. Flying Officer Ellis Wackett was assigned to instruct volunteers at RAAF Richmond, and made the country's first freefall descent from a military aircraft, an Airco DH.9, on 26 May. Williams himself jumped over Point Cook on 5 August, having decided that it would set "a good example if, before issuing an order for the compulsory wearing of parachutes, I showed my own confidence in them ..." Though his descent took him perilously close to the base water tank ("I thought it would be a poor ending to drown there, or even to be pulled out dripping wet") and "too close to be comfortable to a 30,000 volt electric transmission line", he completed the exercise unscathed.

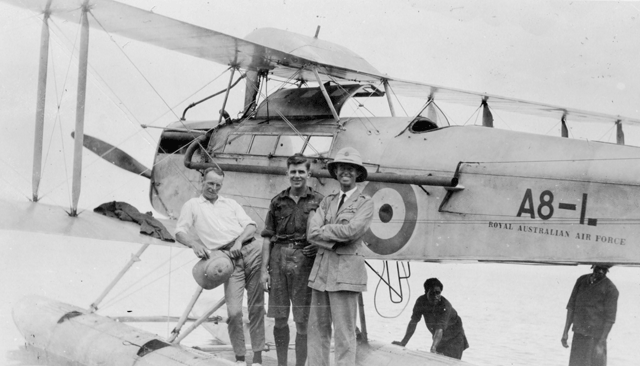
Group Captain Williams (right) with Flight Lieutenant McIntyre (left) and an RAAF mechanic on their Pacific Islands flight in 1926

The young Air Force was a small organisation with the atmosphere of a flying club, although several pioneering flights were made by its members. Goble had commanded the first circumnavigation of Australia by air in 1924 while he was CAS. On 25 September 1926, with two crew members including Goble's pilot, Ivor McIntyre, Williams commenced a 10,000-mile (16,000 km) round trip from Point Cook to the Solomon Islands in a De Havilland DH.50A floatplane, to study the South Pacific region as a possible theatre of operations. The trio returned on 7 December to a 12-plane RAAF escort and a 300-man honour guard. Though seen partly as a "matter of prestige" brought on by contemporary newspaper reports that claimed "'certain Foreign Powers'" were planning such a journey, and also as a "reaction" by Williams to Goble's 1924 expedition, it was notable as the first international flight undertaken by an RAAF plane and crew. Williams was appointed a Commander of the Order of the British Empire (CBE) in the 1927 King's Birthday Honours in recognition of the achievement, and promoted to air commodore on 1 July the same year.

As CAS, Williams had to contend with serious challenges to the RAAF's continued existence from the Army and Navy in 1929 and 1932, arising from the competing demands for defence funding during the Great Depression. According to Williams, only after 1932 was the independence of the Air Force assured. Williams again handed over the reins of CAS to Goble in 1933 to attend the Imperial Defence College in London, resuming his position in June 1934. His promotion to air vice marshal on 1 January 1935 belatedly raised him to the equivalent rank of his fellow Chiefs of Staff in the Army and Navy. He was appointed a Companion of the Order of the Bath in June that year.

Williams encouraged the local aircraft industry as a means to further the self-sufficiency of the Air Force and Australian aviation in general. He played a personal part in the creation of the Commonwealth Aircraft Corporation in November 1936, headed up by former Squadron Leader Lawrence Wackett, late of the RAAF's Experimental Section. Williams made the first overseas flight in an aeroplane designed and built in Australia when he accompanied Squadron Leader Allan Walters and two aircrew aboard a Tugan Gannet to Singapore in February 1938.

A series of mishaps with Hawker Demons at the end of 1937, which resulted in one pilot dying and four injured, subjected the Air Force to harsh public criticism. In 1939 Williams was dismissed from his post as CAS and "effectively banished overseas", following publication of the Ellington Report that January. Its author, Marshal of the Royal Air Force Sir Edward Ellington, criticised the level of air safety observed in the RAAF, though his interpretation of statistics has been called into question. The Federal government praised Williams for strengthening the Air Force but blamed him for Ellington's findings, and he was criticised in the press. Beyond the adverse report, Williams was thought to have "made enemies" through his strident championing of the RAAF's independence. A later CAS, George Jones, contended that Ellington had been "invited to Australia in order to inspect Williams rather than the air force and to recommend his removal from the post of Chief of the Air Staff if necessary". The government announced that it was seconding him to the RAF for two years.

== World War II ==
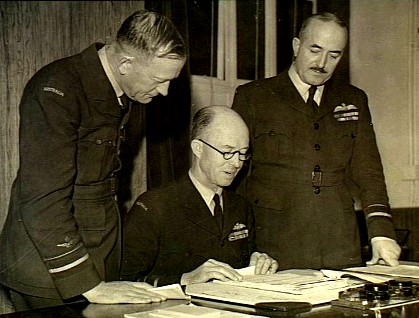
Air Marshal Williams (centre) at RAAF Overseas Headquarters in England, with Air Vice Marshals Wrigley (left) and McNamara (right), 1941

When war broke out in September 1939, Williams was Air Officer in charge of Administration at RAF Coastal Command, a position he had held since February that year, following a brief posting to the British Air Ministry. Goble had succeeded Williams as Chief of the Air Staff for the last time but clashed with the Federal government over implementation of the Empire Air Training Scheme and stepped down in early 1940. Williams was recalled from Britain with the expectation of again taking up the RAAF's senior position but Prime Minister Robert Menzies insisted on a British officer commanding the service, over the protest of his Minister for Air, James Fairbairn, and the RAF's Air Chief Marshal Sir Charles Burnett became CAS. In his volume in the official history of the Air Force in World War II, Douglas Gillison observed that considering Williams's intimate knowledge of the RAAF and its problems, and his long experience commanding the service, "it is difficult to see what contribution Burnett was expected to make that was beyond Williams' capacity". Williams was appointed Air Member for Organisation and Equipment and promoted to air marshal, the first man in the RAAF to achieve this rank.

Williams returned to England in October 1941 to set up RAAF Overseas Headquarters, co-ordinating services for the many Australians posted there. He maintained that Australian airmen in Europe and the Mediterranean should serve in RAAF units to preserve their national identity, as per Article XV of the Empire Air Training Scheme, rather than be integrated into RAF squadrons, but in practice most served in British units. Even nominally "RAAF" squadrons formed under the Scheme were rarely composed primarily of Australians, and Williams's efforts to establish a distinct RAAF Group within Bomber Command, similar to the Royal Canadian Air Force's No. 6 Group, did not come to fruition. He was able to negotiate improved conditions for RAAF personnel in Europe, including full Australian pay scales as opposed to the lower RAF rates that were offered initially.

When Air Chief Marshal Burnett completed his term in 1942, Williams was once more considered for the role of CAS. This was vetoed by Prime Minister John Curtin and the appointment unexpectedly went to acting Air Commodore George Jones. A mooted Inspector Generalship of the Air Force, which would have seen Williams reporting directly to the Minister for Air, also failed to materialise. Instead Williams was posted to Washington, D.C. as the RAAF's representative to the Combined Chiefs of Staff, and remained there until the end of the war.

== Later career ==
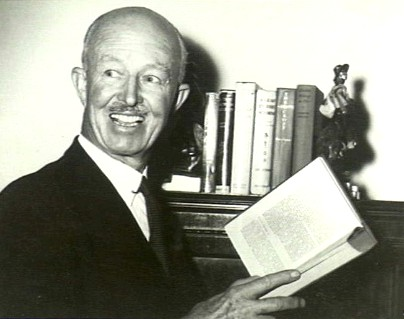
Williams as Australia's Director-General of Civil Aviation, 1946–1955

In 1946, Williams was forced into retirement despite being four years below the mandatory age of 60. All other senior RAAF commanders who were veteran pilots of World War I, with the exception of the-then Chief of the Air Staff, Air Vice Marshal Jones, were also dismissed, ostensibly to make way for the advancement of younger officers. Williams regarded the grounds for his removal as "specious", calling it "the meanest piece of service administration in my experience".

Following his completion of duty in the Air Force, Williams was appointed Australia's Director-General of Civil Aviation, serving in the position for almost 10 years. His department was responsible for the expansion of communications and infrastructure to support domestic and international aviation, establishing "an enviable safety record". Williams's tenure coincided with the beginnings of the government carrier Trans Australia Airlines (TAA) and introduction of the Two Airlines Policy, as well as the construction of Adelaide Airport and redevelopment of Sydney Airport as an international facility.

Williams's wife Constance died in 1948 and he married Lois Victoria Cross on 7 February 1950. He was appointed Knight Commander of the Order of the British Empire (KBE) in the 1954 New Year Honours, the year before he retired from the Director-Generalship of Civil Aviation. He then took up a place on the board of Tasman Empire Airways Limited (TEAL), forerunner of Air New Zealand. In 1977, Williams published his memoirs, These Are Facts, described in 2001 as "immensely important if idiosyncratic ... the only substantial, worthwhile record of service ever written by an RAAF chief of staff".

Sir Richard Williams died in Melbourne on 7 February 1980. He was accorded an Air Force funeral, with a flypast by seventeen aircraft.

== Legacy ==
The RAAF's greatest achievement in its first eighteen years was ... simply to survive as an independent service ... Many people contributed to that achievement, but none more than Dicky Williams.

— Alan Stephens

For his stewardship of the Air Force before World War II, as well as his part in its establishment in 1921, Williams is considered the "father" of the RAAF. The epithet had earlier been applied to Eric Harrison, who had sole charge of Central Flying School after Henry Petre was posted to the Middle East in 1915, and was also a founding member of the RAAF. By the 1970s, the mantle had settled on Williams. Between the wars he had continually striven for his service's status as a separate branch of the Australian armed forces, seeing off several challenges to its independence from Army and Navy interests. He remains the RAAF's longest-serving Chief, totalling thirteen years over three terms: October to December 1922; February 1925 to December 1932; and June 1934 to February 1939.

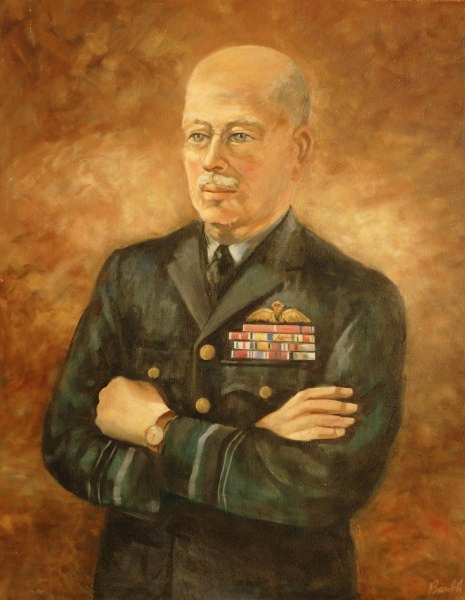
Williams by Douglas Baulch, 1964

In his 1925 paper "Memorandum Regarding the Air Defence of Australia", Williams defined "the fundamental nature of Australia's defence challenge" and "the enduring characteristics of the RAAF's strategic thinking". Ignored by the government of the day, the study's operational precepts became the basis for Australia's defence strategy in the 1980s, which remains in place in the 21st century. His input to debate in the 1930s around the "Singapore strategy" of dependence on the Royal Navy for the defence of the Pacific region has been criticised as limited, and as having "failed to demonstrate the validity of his claims for the central role of air power".

Williams's legacy extends to the very look of the RAAF. He personally chose the colour of the Air Force's winter uniform, a shade "somewhere between royal and navy blue", designed to distinguish it from the lighter Royal Air Force shade. Unique at the time among Commonwealth forces, the uniform was changed to an all-purpose middle blue suit in 1972 but following many complaints in the ensuing years reverted to Williams's original colour and style in 2000.

Memorials to Williams include Sir Richard Williams Avenue at Adelaide Airport, and RAAF Williams in Victoria, established in 1989 after the merger of Point Cook and Laverton bases. The Sir Richard Williams Trophy, inaugurated in 1974, is presented to the RAAF's "Fighter Pilot of the Year". In 2005, Williams's Australian Flying Corps wings, usually on display at the RAAF Museum in Point Cook, were carried into space and back on a shuttle flight by Australian-born astronaut Dr Andy Thomas. The Williams Foundation, named in his honour, was launched in February 2009 "to broaden public debate on issues relating to Australian defence and security".

== Notes ==
Military offices
Preceded by Amyas Borton	Officer Commanding Palestine Brigade (RAF); November 1918 – January 1919	Unknown
New title Formerly First Air Member	Chief of the Air Staff; October–December 1922	Succeeded by Stanley Goble
Preceded by Stanley Goble	Chief of the Air Staff; February 1925 – December 1932	Succeeded by Stanley Goble
Preceded by Stanley Goble	Chief of the Air Staff; June 1934 – February 1939	Succeeded by Stanley Goble
New title HQ established	Air Officer Commanding RAAF Overseas Headquarters; October 1941 – January 1942	Succeeded by Frank McNamara
Government offices
Preceded by Daniel McVey	Director-General of the Department of Civil Aviation; June 1946 – December 1955	Succeeded by Don Anderson
