= Amyas Borton =

Amyas Eden Borton
- Brigadier General Amyas Borton, c. 1917–1918
- Born: 20 September 1886; Tanfield, Durham, England
- Died: 15 August 1969 (aged 82); Maidstone, Kent, England
- Relatives: General Sir Arthur Borton (grandfather); Lieutenant Colonel Arthur Borton (brother)
- Military career
- Allegiance: United Kingdom
- Branch: British Army (1904–1918); Royal Air Force (1918–33)
- Service years: 1904–1933
- Rank: Air vice marshal
- Nickname: Biffy
- Commands: Inland Area (1929–1933); Royal Air Force College Cranwell (1923–1926); Mesopotamian Group (1921–1922); Palestine Brigade (1917–1918); 40th (Army) Wing (1917); Fifth Wing, RFC (1917); No. 27 Squadron RFC (1915–1916); No. 10 Squadron RFC (1915)
- Conflicts: First World War
- Awards: Companion of the Order of the Bath; Companion of the Order of St Michael and St George; Distinguished Service Order; Air Force Cross; Mentioned in Despatches; Order of Saint Stanislaus, 3rd Class with Swords (Russia); Commander of the Order of the Nile (Egypt); Order of Al Nahda, 3rd Class (Kingdom of Hijaz)

Air Vice Marshal Amyas Eden Borton, CB, CMG, DSO, AFC (20 September 1886 – 15 August 1969) was a pilot and commander in the Royal Flying Corps during the First World War and a senior commander in the Royal Air Force during the 1920s. He saw active service on the Western Front, in Palestine and in Iraq. In the latter part of his career, Borton was the second Commandant of the RAF College at Cranwell before becoming the Air Officer Commanding RAF Inland Area.

== Early life and infantry service ==
Amyas Borton was born on 20 September 1886 in Tanfield, Durham, the younger son of Irish-born Lieutenant Colonel Arthur Borton, a soldier and barrister. His elder brother, named Arthur Borton like their father, was known as "Bosky" whereas Amyas was known as "Biffy".

He was commissioned into the Black Watch Militia in January 1904. In 1906, while remaining in the Black Watch, Borton transferred to the Regular Army. He learned to fly whilst on leave from his regiment in 1911, gaining Royal Aero Club certificate no. 170 on 9 January 1912.

== First World War ==
=== England and the Western Front ===
Two months prior to the outbreak of the First World War, Borton was seconded to the Military Wing of the Royal Flying Corps (RFC), serving as a pilot on No. 5 Squadron at RAF Netheravon. Following the start of the war in June, Borton flew with his squadron to France. It is recognised that while serving on the Western Front, Borton invented the slang term "archie" for anti-aircraft fire. The usage came about because Borton was probably the first pilot to shout the words "Archibald, certainly not" (from a popular music-hall song written by George Robey) as he flew between the exploding German shells. Lieutenant Maurice Baring who was attached to RFC headquarters during the war, noted in his diary that the term was already popular among the pilots of 5 Squadron by 15 September 1914, and that there seemed to be only a single gun which gave them trouble.

In November Borton was promoted to captain and made a flight commander and posted to a different squadron which resulted in his return to England to take up duties at Brooklands. Amyas was joined at Brooklands by his brother, who was an RFC observer at that time. In April 1915 Borton returned to France as a flight commander on No. 8 Squadron. On 7 June, while engaged in aerial combat, Borton received a bullet wound to the head and neck. Although the injury was severe, he and his observer Captain Anthony Marshall managed to bandage the wound. Despite severe loss of blood, Borton kept control of his aircraft, completing the reconnaissance sortie and landing safely. He was later awarded the Distinguished Service Order for his actions.

Borton's recovery was prolonged. In early July, he was still judged to be "not yet out of danger" and it was not until late October 1915 that he returned to duty, being promoted to major and made the officer commanding of No. 10 (Training) Squadron which was in England at that time. Just over two months later he was given a new squadron, being appointed officer commanding No. 27 Squadron on 27 December. Initially based at Hounslow Heath Aerodrome, Middlesex and later on the Western Front, Borton remained in command until the end of July 1916. During this time members of Borton's squadron flew missions delivering secret agents behind enemy lines.

On 1 August 1916, Borton was recalled to England and promoted to lieutenant colonel. Back in England, he was appointed officer commanding of a new training wing at Felton near Bristol.

=== Palestine ===
By mid December 1916, Borton had received his orders for Palestine, although he was able to spend Christmas and the New Year with his father and other family members at Cheveney. Borton departed Plymouth on 10 January on the troop ship Devon, arriving in Alexandria, Egypt, 28 January. He took up his new post as officer commanding the Fifth Wing RFC on 5 February 1917, succeeding Lieutenant-Colonel Joubert de la Ferté. His new command comprised two squadrons at the time and had a total of 42 aircraft. The Fifth Wing played an important role in the First and Second Battle of Gaza while Borton was in command.

In October 1917, Borton was moved sideways to head the newly created Fortieth Wing which was based in the Middle East. Having set up the Fortieth Wing, on 14 December he was promoted to brigadier general and given command of the Palestine Brigade which consisted of the Fifth and Fortieth wings. As Officer Commanding the Palestine Brigade, Borton was General Allenby's air commander although he also reported to the general officer commanding the Royal Flying Corps in the Middle East, Major-General Salmond. Borton played an important role in the Palestine campaign during his time in command. In late July and early August 1918, Borton along with Major Archibald McLaren flew a Handley Page 0/400 biplane bomber from Manston, England to Alexandria. The aircraft later played a key role in the Battle of Megiddo when it was used to bomb the Turkish Headquarters and telephone exchange in Al-Fuleh. Later in the Battle, the aircraft of Borton's Palestine Brigade destroyed the Turkish Seventh Army which marked the end of any Turkish power west of the Jordan.

== Inter-war years ==
After the war, Borton remained in the newly established RAF and was granted a permanent commission as a lieutenant-colonel. When the RAF introduced its own rank titles in 1919, he was regraded as a wing commander (the equivalent rank to his substantive former rank of lieutenant-colonel). However, he was rapidly promoted to group captain and by the end of 1919 he was the officer in charge of administration at the RAF's command headquarters at Halton.

At the start of 1921, Borton returned to the Middle East, this time as the Officer Commanding the newly established Mesopotamian Group which was the air element of the Army-led British forces in the British Mandate of Mesopotamia. Borton instigated air control measures as a means of pacifying the region. After the Kingdom of Iraq was established under British oversight, Borton's command was renamed the Iraq Group in October 1921. In October 1922, the British Armed Forces in Iraq were reorganized as Iraq Command under Air Vice Marshal John Salmond. Borton remained in Iraq into 1923, working for Salmond.

From 1923 to 1926, Borton was the second officer to hold the appointment of commandant of the RAF College and the air officer commanding RAF Cranwell. Several months after becoming commandant, he married Muriel Agnes Slater at the Savoy Chapel in London. Prior to his marriage, Borton had met and dated Agatha Miller (later the famous author, Agatha Christie), who rejected him.

On 1 November 1926, Borton was appointed director of personnel services at the Air Ministry in succession to Air Vice-Marshal Longcroft. Borton remained Director until 1 July 1929 when he was succeeded by Air Commodore Peregrine Fellowes. Borton took up his final appointment as Air Officer Commanding Inland Area on 1 November 1929, continuing in post until he retired from the RAF on 23 August 1933 in the rank of air vice-marshal.

In 1935, he persuaded Sir Harold Snagge, chairman of the Napier engineering company, to make special arrangements to enable Dorothy Spicer to be the first woman to study and qualify for a 'D' licence, enabling her to inspect, pass out, and repair both engines and airframes, being qualified to build all aspects of an aircraft, airframe, and engine from scratch, and to approve the materials required for the work.

Military offices
Preceded by S Smith	Officer Commanding No. 27 Squadron RFC; 1915–1916	Succeeded by S Smith
Preceded by Philip Joubert de la Ferté	Officer Commanding Fifth Wing, RFC; February–October 1917	Succeeded by Charles Burnett
New title	Officer Commanding 40th (Army) Wing; October–November 1917	Succeeded by A Shekleton
Preceded by Sefton Brancker	Officer Commanding Palestine Brigade; 1917–1918	Succeeded by Charles Burnett
New title Group established	Officer Commanding Mesopotamian Group; Officer Commanding Iraq Group from 13 October 1921; 1921–1922	Succeeded by John Salmond; As AOC Iraq Command
Preceded by Charles Longcroft	RAF College Commandant; 1923–1926	Succeeded by Frederick Halahan
Preceded by Charles Longcroft	Director of Personal Services; 1926–1929	Succeeded by Peregrine Fellowes
Preceded by Charles Longcroft	Air Officer Commanding Inland Area; 1929–1933	Succeeded by Arthur Longmore
