= William Maitland =

William Maitland may refer to:

- William Maitland of Lethington (1525–1573), Scottish politician and reformer
- William Maitland (historian) (1693–1757), Scottish merchant, historian and topographer
- William Fuller Maitland (1813–1876), English picture collector
- William Whitaker Maitland (1794–1861), British landowner and High Sheriff of Essex
- William Maitland (civil servant) (1847–1919), British civil servant in India, and cricketer
