= Palestine Brigade RAF =

Palestine Brigade
- Active: 5 October 1917 –
- Country: United Kingdom
- Branch: Royal Air Force

The Palestine Brigade of the Royal Flying Corps, and later Royal Air Force, was formed 5 October 1917 in response to General Allenby's request for an air formation for his planned offensive against the Ottoman Empire in Palestine. In 1920 it was redesignated as the Palestine Group.

== Background ==
Prior to Allenby's appointment as commander of the Egyptian Expeditionary Force, the German and Ottoman air services had enjoyed air superiority in the Levant. This was because of the superior quantity and quality of German Rumpler and Fokker aircraft in comparison to the British aircraft. Allenby was an air power enthusiast and he requested that the British War Office increase the number and quality of Flying Corps aircraft at his disposal.

== Formation and composition ==
With an increased number of British aircraft in the Middle East, the Palestine Brigade was formed on 5 October 1917. It consisted of all Royal Flying Corps operational units based in the Middle East which were east of Suez. Forming part of Royal Flying Corps Middle East and it was initially commanded by Brigadier-General W G H Salmond who retained command of RFC Middle East. In December 1917, command of the Palestine Brigade ceased to be held by the commander of RFC Middle East. Brigadier-General A E Borton was appointed Brigade Commander and Salmond, who had been promoted to Major-General, was GOC RFC Middle East. Although Borton answered directly to Allenby for operational matters, Salmond maintained a keen interest in the activities of the Palestine Brigade.

The Palestine Brigade consisted of the following two wings:

- 5th (Corps) Wing - tasked with aerial cooperation and direct support to Allenby's ground formations.
- 40th (Army) Wing - formed at the same time as the Palestine Brigade and tasked with counter-air missions and attacking the Ottoman and German support infrastructure.

In addition, by the summer of 1918 the brigade also had a balloon company, an aircraft park, an aircraft depot and an engine repair depot. In August, the brigade was strengthened by the addition of a single Handley Page 0/400 biplane bomber which had been flown from England.

In June 1919, the headquarters of the Palestine Brigade and its two subordinate wings were merged to form the Arbitive Amalgamated HQ. This headquarters was then redesignated as the Palestine Group on 18 March 1920. The group was reduced to Palestine Wing on 1 April 1922.

== Actions ==
The Palestine Brigade saw action throughout the Palestine Campaign, most notably at the Battle of Megiddo when the retreating Ottoman Seventh Army was destroyed on Nablus-Beisan road by aerial attack.

== Commanders ==
The following officers commanded the Palestine Brigade and its successor formations:

=== Commanders of the Palestine Brigade ===
- 5 October 1917 Brigadier-General W G H Salmond
- 5 November 1917 Brigadier-General W S Brancker
- 14 December 1917 Brigadier-General A E Borton
- 17 May to 15 August 1918 Lieutenant Colonel C S Burnett (Temporary appointment)
- 29 November 1918 to 26 January 1919 Lieutenant Colonel R Williams (Temporary appointment)

=== Commanders of the Arbitive Amalgamated HQ ===
- 26 June 1919 Major W J Y Guilfoyle
- 23 August to 7 October 1919 Squadron Leader W L Welsh
- 5 January 1920 Wing Commander C S Burnett

=== Commanders of the Palestine Group ===
- 18 March 1920 Wing Commander C S Burnett
- 20 March 1920 Wing Commander S Grant-Dalton
- 26 November 1920 Group Captain U J D Bourke
- 1 January 1922 Group Captain P F M Fellowes
