= Palestine Brigade =

Palestine Brigade may refer to:

- Palestine Brigade RAF, a World War I Royal Air Force formation which saw action against the Ottoman Empire in Palestine
- Jewish Brigade, a World War II British Army formation
