= Fifth wing =

Fifth wing or 5th wing may refer to:

- No. 5 Wing RAF, originally established as the Fifth Wing of the Royal Flying Corps, a Royal Flying Corps wing during World War I
- 5th Bomb Wing, a unit of the United States Air Force
