= No. 40 Wing =

No. 40 Wing may refer to:

- No. 40 Wing RAF, a Royal Air Force wing that operated in Palestine from 1917 to 1920
- 40th Air Expeditionary Wing, a United States Air Force wing
