= No. 40 Wing RAF =

No. 40 Wing RAF

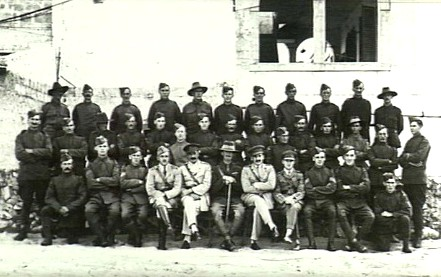
- Headquarters 40th (Army) Wing RAF, Palestine, 1918
- Active: 5 October 1917 – 1 April 1920
- Country: United Kingdom
- Branch: British Army (before 1 April 1918); Royal Air Force (after 1 April 1918)
- Type: Aircraft
- Role: Counter-air; Bombing; Photo-reconnaissance
- Size: 4 squadrons
- Part of: Palestine Brigade
- Base: Ramleh (1918); Ismailia (1919–20)
- Engagements: Battle of Megiddo

Commanders
- Notable commanders: Amyas Borton; Richard Williams

Aircraft flown
- Bomber: Airco DH.9; Handley Page O/400
- Fighter: Bristol F.2 Fighter; Royal Aircraft Factory S.E.5

No. 40 Wing formed part of the Royal Air Force (RAF) Palestine Brigade during World War I and immediately after. It was established in October 1917 as 40th (Army) Wing, Royal Flying Corps (RFC), and become part of the RAF in April 1918, when the RFC merged with the Royal Naval Air Service. The wing played a major part in the Battle of Megiddo, the last great offensive against the Ottoman Empire, in September 1918. It was disbanded in April 1920.

== History ==
40th (Army) Wing RFC was formed on 5 October 1917, under the control of the RFC's Palestine Brigade. Its primary roles were counter-air operations and attacks on enemy infrastructure. It also undertook extensive photo-reconnaissance work. Another formation under the Palestine Brigade, 5th (Corps) Wing, performed air cooperation and close air support tasks. 40th Wing's first Officer Commanding was Lieutenant Colonel Amyas Borton; he was succeeded by Alexander Shekleton in late 1917. In June 1918, Lieutenant Colonel Richard Williams of the Australian Flying Corps (AFC) took command of the wing, with No. 1 Squadron AFC and three RFC squadrons—Nos. 111, 144, and 145—at his disposal. No. 145 Squadron was also commanded by an Australian, Captain Roy Drummond. Based at Ramleh, the wing's inventory consisted of Bristol F.2B and S.E.5 fighters and DH.9 light bombers.

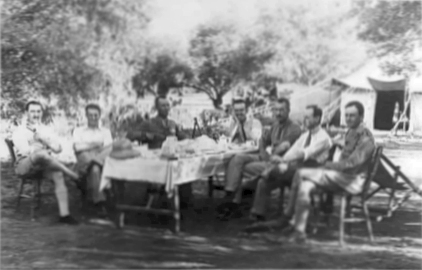
Wing officers seated in an olive grove in Ramleh

Augmented by a giant Handley Page bomber, No. 40 Wing took part in the Battle of Megiddo, General Allenby's final offensive in Palestine, where its units inflicted "wholesale destruction" on Turkish columns through sustained aerial assaults. At Wadi Fara on 21 September 1918, the Palestine Brigade, including the 40th Wing's four squadrons, destroyed the bulk of the Turkish Seventh Army as it attempted to cross the Jordan River along an old Roman road leading from Nablus, an early demonstration of the effects of concentrated air attack on ground troops. Williams wrote: "The Turkish Seventh Army ceased to exist and it must be noted that this was entirely the result of attack from the air." A detachment from No. 1 Squadron also aided Major T. E. Lawrence's Arab army north of Amman when it was harassed by German aircraft operating from Deraa.

While the wing's actions during the Battle of Megiddo "assured Allenby's victory" according to historian Lawrence James, the new method of waging war by inflicting "sickening slaughter" from the air provoked a strong reaction from Lieutenant General Edward Bulfin, commander of the British XXI Corps. He confronted Major General Geoffrey Salmond, Air Officer Commanding RAF Middle East, with the comment, "You are a butcher—you call that fighting?"

No. 40 Wing was based at RAF Ismailia in Egypt from 1919, and disbanded on 1 April 1920.

== Order of battle ==
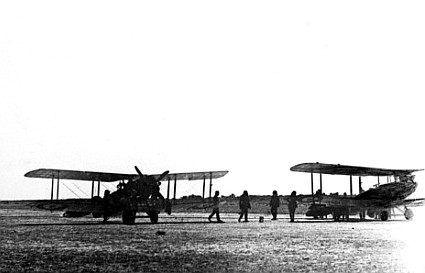
DH.9s of 40th Wing, 1918

Prior to the Battle of Megiddo in September 1918, No. 40 Wing consisted of the following units and equipment:

- Headquarters – Ramleh
- No. 1 Squadron AFC (Bristol F.2B, Handley Page Type O)
- No. 111 Squadron RAF (S.E.5)
- No. 144 Squadron RAF (DH.9)
- No. 145 Squadron RAF (S.E.5)

== See also ==
- List of Wings of the Royal Air Force
