= Francis Scarlett (RAF officer) =

Royal Air Force Air Vice-Marshal (1875-1934)

Air Vice Marshal Francis Scarlett CB DSO
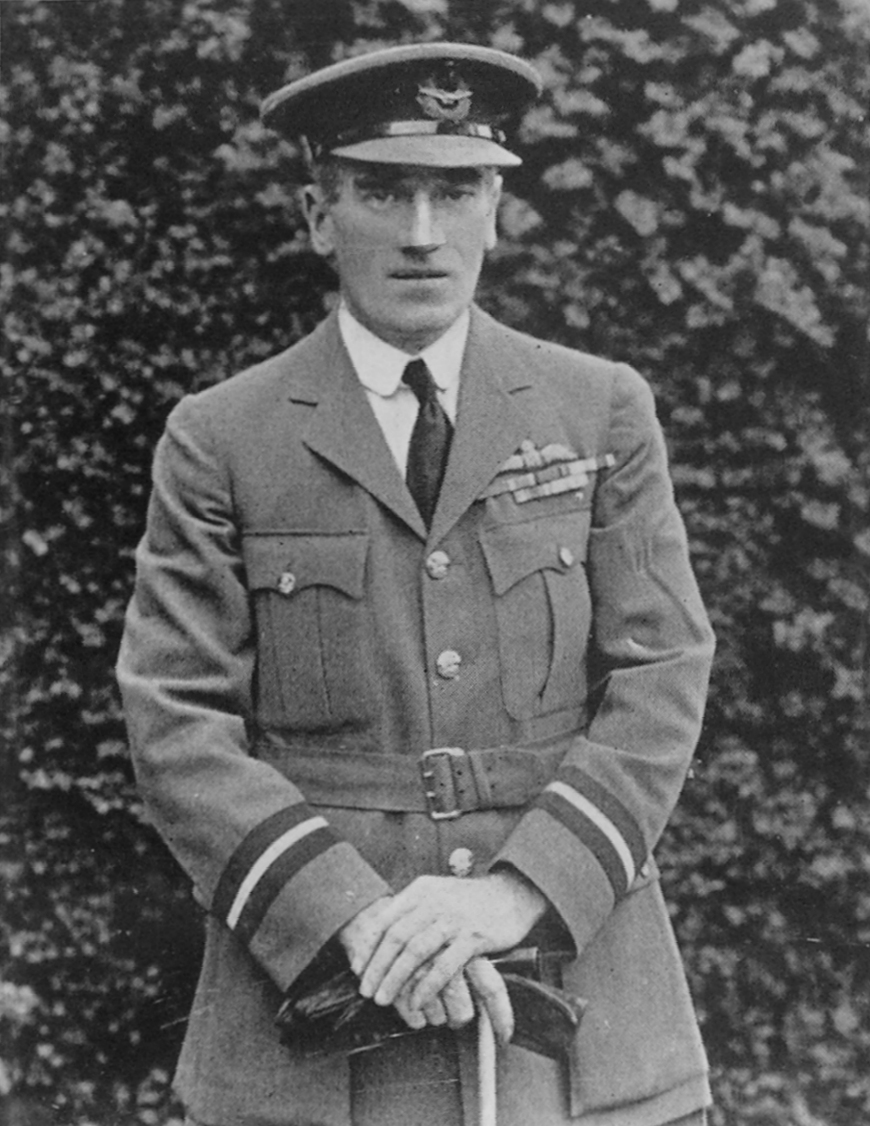
- Air Commodore Francis Scarlett c. 1919–1924
- Born: 18 May 1875
- Died: 15 April 1934 (aged 58)
- Military career
- Allegiance: United Kingdom
- Branch: Royal Navy (1889–1918); Royal Air Force (1918–1931)
- Service years: 1889–1931
- Rank: Air Vice Marshal
- Commands: RAF Middle East (1929–1931); Fighting Area (1929); Air Defence of Great Britain (1928–1929); Coastal Area (1924–1928); RAF Halton (1919–1924); No. 1 School of Technical Training (1919–1924); No. 12 Group (1919); RNAS Eastern Mediterranean (1916–1917)
- Conflicts: First World War
- Awards: Companion of the Order of the Bath; Distinguished Service Order; Mentioned in Despatches; Commander of the Order of the Redeemer (Greece)

Air Vice Marshal Francis Rowland Scarlett (18 May 1875 – 15 April 1934) was a senior Royal Air Force commander.

== Early and family life ==
Francis Rowland Scarlett was born on 18 May 1875, the son of Lieutenant Colonel William James Scarlett. At the age of 29 he married Dora Blakiston-Houston, the daughter of John Blakiston-Houston, an Irish Unionist Party politician. He was the father of Air Vice Marshal James Scarlett-Streatfeild who was killed serving in the Second World War.

== Military career ==
Scarlett joined the Royal Navy in (or around) 1891, and held the rank of lieutenant when in July 1902 he was posted as 1st lieutenant on the training ship HMS Caledonia, anchored at the Firth of Forth. In April 1913 he attended the Central Flying School, being awarded his Aviator's Certificate no. 468 on 4 April 1913. He served in the First World War as the Inspecting Captain of Aircraft, of Air Stations and then of Air Training, gaining a promotion to wing captain at the close of 1915. In February 1916 he became Commander of all Royal Naval Air Service units in the Eastern Mediterranean and in May 1919 he was given command of No. 12 Group. He was created a Commander of the Greek Order of the Redeemer.

In December 1919 became was made Officer Commanding the No. 1 School of Technical Training at RAF Halton and on 22 January 1920, he was awarded a permanent commission in the RAF. He went on to be Air Officer Commanding Coastal Area in 1924, Air Officer Commanding Air Defence of Great Britain (on a temporary basis) in 1928 and Air Officer Commanding Fighting Area in January 1929. His last appointment was as Air Officer Commanding Middle East Command in October 1929 before he retired in the rank of air vice marshal in December 1931.

Military offices
New post	Inspecting Captain of Air Training; 1915–1916	Succeeded by Harold Briggs
Preceded by Frederick Sykes	Officer Commanding RNAS Eastern Mediterranean; 1916–1917	Vacant Title next held by unknown
Preceded by Harold Briggs	General Officer Commanding No. 12 Group; 1919	Vacant Title next held by John Tyssen
New post	Commandant, No. 1 School of Technical Training; 1919–1924	Succeeded by Charles Lambe
Preceded by Vyell Vyvyan	Air Officer Commanding Coastal Area; 1924–1928	Succeeded by Charles Lambe
Preceded by Sir John Salmond	Commander-in-Chief Air Defence of Great Britain; 1928–1929	Succeeded by Sir Edward Ellington
Preceded by Tom Webb-Bowen	Air Officer Commanding RAF Middle East; 1929–1931	Succeeded by Cyril Newall
