= Philip Joubert de la Ferté =

Royal Air Force Air Chief Marshal (1887-1965)

Air Chief Marshal Sir Philip Joubert de la Ferté KCB CMG DSO
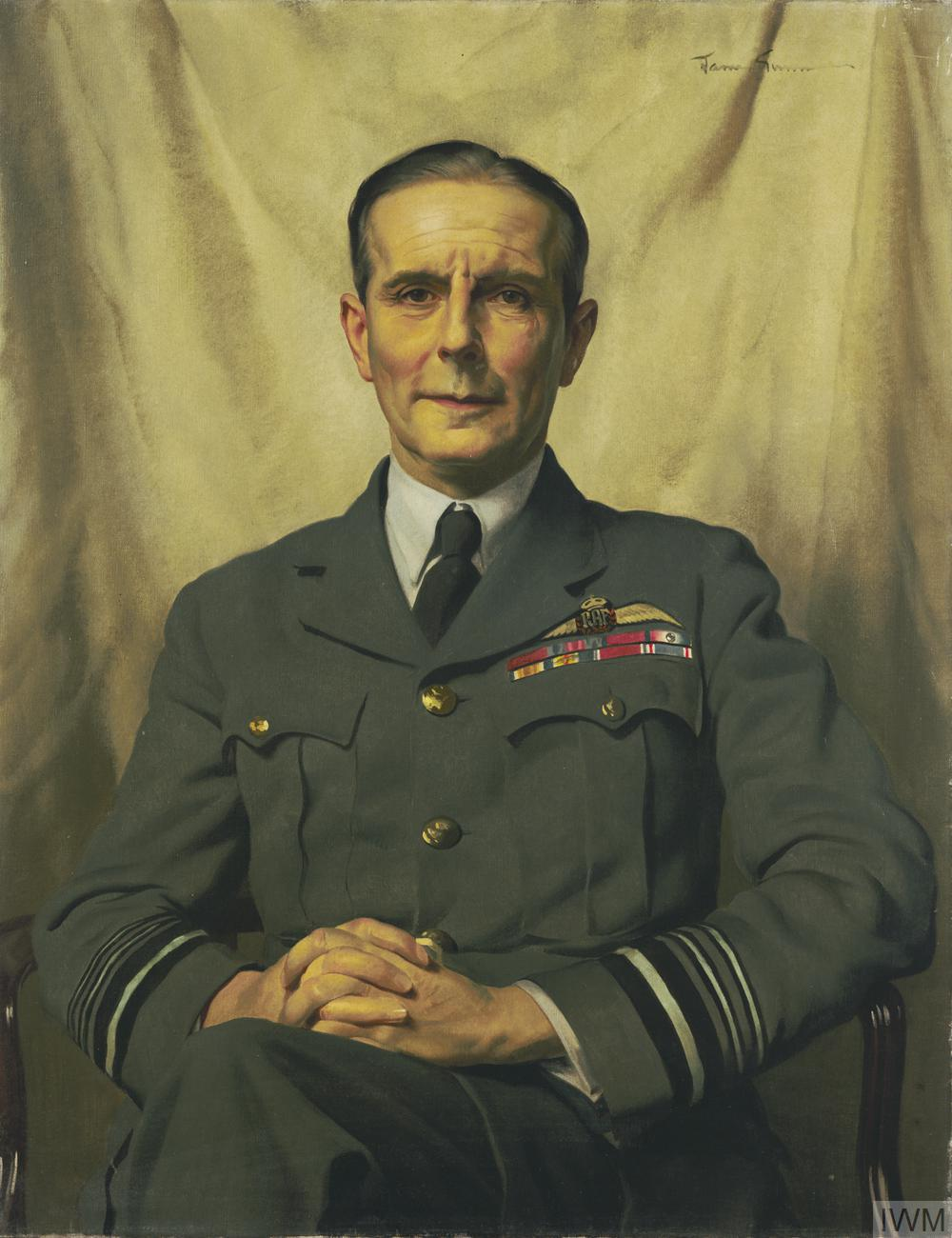
- 1940 portrait by Herbert James Gunn
- Born: 21 May 1887; Darjeeling, India
- Died: 21 January 1965 (aged 77); Uxbridge, England
- Military career
- Allegiance: United Kingdom
- Branch: British Army (1907–18); Royal Air Force (1918–43)
- Service years: 1907–43
- Rank: Air Chief Marshal
- Commands: Inspector-General of the RAF (1943); Coastal Command (1936–37, 1941–43); Air Forces in India (1937–39); No. 11 Group (1936); Fighting Area (1934–36); RAF Staff College, Andover (1930–33); No. 23 Group (1929–30); No. 2 (Training) Group (1919); RAF in Italy (1918–19); 14th (Army) Wing (1917–18); 21st Wing (1917); Fifth Wing (1916–17); No. 33 Squadron (1916); No. 1 Squadron (1915); No. 15 Squadron (1915)
- Conflicts: First World War; Second World War
- Awards: Knight Commander of the Order of the Bath; Companion of the Order of St Michael and St George; Distinguished Service Order; Mentioned in Despatches (5); Knight of the Order of Saints Maurice and Lazarus (Italy); War Cross for Military Valor (Italy); Commander of the Legion of Merit (United States); Knight Grand Cross of the Order of Orange-Nassau (Netherlands)
- Other work: Author

Air Chief Marshal Sir Philip Bennet Joubert de la Ferté, KCB, CMG, DSO (21 May 1887 – 21 January 1965) was a senior commander in the Royal Air Force during the 1930s and the Second World War.

== Early life ==
Joubert de la Ferté was born in Darjeeling, India to Colonel Charles Henry Joubert de la Ferté, IMS and Eliza Jane, eldest daughter of Philip Sandys Melvill of the Indian Civil Service. He was of partial French descent, his paternal grandfather having emigrated to England in 1840. He was sent to England as a child where he attended Elstree School and later Harrow School.

== RAF career ==
Joubert de la Ferté joined the British Army attending the Royal Military Academy Woolwich and gaining his commission in 1907. From 1907 to 1913 he served in the Royal Field Artillery, rising to the rank of lieutenant. In 1913 he attended the Central Flying School and went on to serve in the Royal Flying Corps. With the outbreak of the First World War in 1914, he joined the British Expeditionary Force flying one of the first two operational sorties of the war. In 1915 Joubert de la Ferté was appointed Officer Commanding, No. 15 Squadron RFC. Later that year he took up command of No. 1 Squadron. As the war progressed, Joubert de la Ferté commanded No. 33 Squadron and then several different wings. On 1 April 1918 Joubert de la Ferté transferred to the Royal Air Force in the rank of lieutenant colonel and by the end of hostilities in 1918 he had command of the Royal Air Force in Italy.

During the inter-war years, Joubert de la Ferté occupied several staff and command posts, rising through the ranks. Notably, he was appointed Air Officer Commanding No. 23 Group in 1929, Commandant of the RAF Staff College, Andover, in 1930 and Air Officer Commanding No. 11 Group in July 1936 before becoming Air Officer Commanding-in-Chief Coastal Command in September 1936.

At the start of the Second World War, Joubert de la Ferté was Air Officer Commanding Air Forces in India. On his return to Great Britain he occupied a number of senior staff appointments and returned to his former post as Air Officer Commanding-in-Chief Coastal Command. It was there that he pioneered several innovations. These included Planned Flying and Maintenance and the introduction of a torpedo version of the Beaufighter. In February 1943 he became an Inspector-General of the RAF.

On 23 November 1943, Joubert de la Ferté was appointed as the Deputy Chief of Staff (Information and Civil Affairs) at the South East Asia Command. Two years later on 14 November 1945, Joubert de la Ferté retired from the RAF.

== Personal life ==
In 1915 he married Marjorie Denison: they had two daughters. He married twice.

== Bibliography ==
The following books by Joubert de la Ferté were published:

- The Fated Sky: An Autobiography – Hutchinson (1952)
- The Third Service – Thames and Hudson (1955)
- Rocket – Hutchinson (1957)
- Look at Aircraft – H Hamilton (1960)
- Birds and Fishes - The Story of Coastal Command – Hutchinson (1960)
- The Forgotten Ones: The Story of the Ground Crews – Hutchinson (1961)
- Fun and Games – Hutchinson (1964)

Military offices
Preceded by Geoffrey Salmond	Officer Commanding No. 1 Squadron RFC; 1915–1915	Succeeded by G F Pretyman
Preceded by Geoffrey Salmond	Officer Commanding Fifth Wing, RFC; 1916–1917	Succeeded by Amyas Borton
Preceded by Edgar Ludlow-Hewitt	Commandant RAF Staff College, Andover; 1930–1933	Succeeded by Wilfrid Freeman
Vacant Title last held by Ian Bonham-Carter	Air Officer Commanding No. 11 Group; 1936– 1936	Succeeded by Leslie Gossage
Preceded by Sir Arthur Longmore	Commander-in-Chief Coastal Command; 1936–1937	Succeeded by Sir Frederick Bowhill
Preceded by Sir Edgar Ludlow-Hewitt	Air Officer Commanding RAF India post retitled AOC, Air Forces in India in 1938; 1937–1939	Succeeded by Sir John Higgins
Preceded by Sir Frederick Bowhill	Commander-in-Chief Coastal Command; 1941–1943	Succeeded by Sir John Slessor
