= Douglas Baulch =

Australian artist (1917-1996)

- Francesca (1970): oil on stretched canvas; full size 180.0 cm x 120.0 cm, Private Collection, Brisbane.
- Born: Ernest Douglas Baulch; 24 May 1917; Malvern, Victoria
- Died: 23 February 1996 (aged 78); Melbourne, Australia
- Known for: Artist
- Movement: Impressionism/Realism

Ernest Douglas Baulch (24 May 1917 – 23 February 1996) was an Australian artist.

Baulch studied at the Prahran Technical College, where his talent for landscapes and impressionism emerged. During World War I, he served in the Royal Australian Air Force. He was commissioned to produce various posters and signage related to the war effort. Baulch worked as a commercial artist for much of his career, producing personal art in his spare time. Many of his works featured landscapes with small children in the background. He exhibited at Government House, state libraries, universities, and banks. In addition, 20 pieces of works were on public display for over 20 years at his alma mater, Prahran Technical College. The need to support his family, and the theft of two of his works from a gallery early in his career, led to Baulch exhibiting less than his peers. However, after his children were grown, Baulch was able to devote more of his time to his work, as well as teaching from his home, on television, and at various colleges and universities. His works are currently held in numerous private collections.

== Early life and education ==
Baulch was born at Malvern, Victoria, Australia, the only youngest of three children of Ernest Stanley Baulch and Anne O'Connor. Before he turned 1, his father left to serve in France during World War 1, only to return hospitalised for the rest of his life being completely incapacitated til his death 8 years later. His illness and death affected the young Douglas. His father eventually died in 1926 when Baulch was only 9 years old.

Baulch began his training at the Prahran Technical College (modern day, Swinburne University) in 1931. He was strongly influenced by his tutor, Tom Carter who recognised Baulch's natural talent as an impressionist. Carter introduced him to William Dargie with whom he had a long-standing friendship. Douglas took a strong interest in Australian landscapes.

In 1934, Baulch won a school prize for intermediate art. The same year, he graduated as a qualified teacher, but continued part-time with post graduate studies from 1934. In 1935, he won a prize for fashion drawing.

== Career ==
Baulch worked as a commercial artist at Troedel and Cooper Pty Ltd from 1936 to 1938, then until 1940 with the fashion and society photographer, Athol Shmith. He completed his post graduate studies in Fine Arts and Commercial Arts in 1940.

However, Baulch became disillusioned soon after graduating when he supplied two of his favourite pieces to a private gallery in Melbourne that then claimed the pieces were stolen. The gallery closed and his paintings were never seen again. After that experience, Baulch became more guarded and exhibited significantly less than other friends, such as Sidney Nolan.

With the outbreak of the Second World War, Baulch signed on to the Royal Australian Air Force working predominantly in northern Australia and the Pacific as a commercial artist. Between 1943 and 1945, he was commissioned to produce various posters and signage related to the war effort. Subsequently, he painted a portrait of Sir Richard Williams, the first military pilot trained in Australia, who played a leading role in the establishment of the RAAF and became its first Chief of the Air Staff in 1922.

Douglas Baulch: Noon Retreat - Yarra Valley Metropolitan Park (1963), Private Collection, Brisbane.

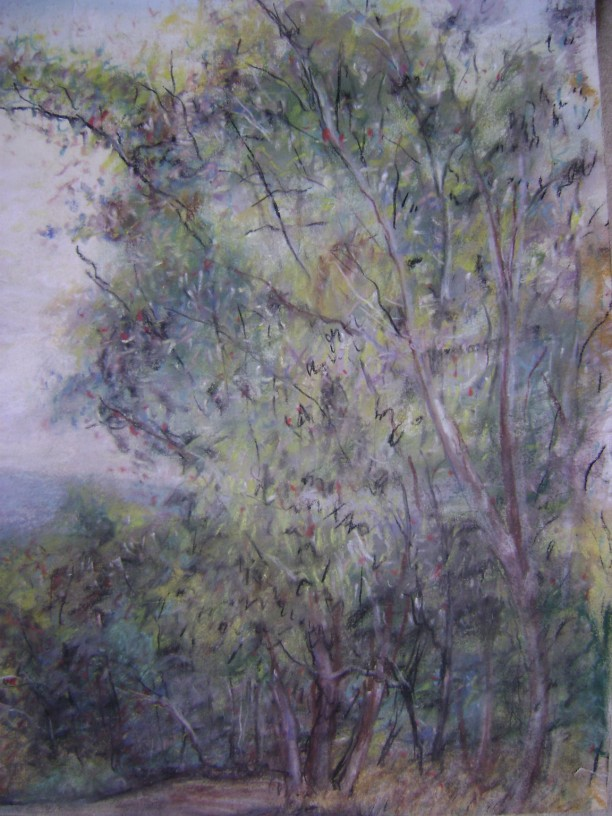
Douglas Baulch: Spring Eucalypts - Templestowe (1959), Private Collection, Brisbane.

Baulch married in 1944. In 1952, he moved to East Doncaster, using the Lower Templestowe and Warrandyte areas often as inspiration to portray the geography and rugged bush of the area at the time. He became good friends with Ernest Buckmaster who lived in Warrandyte.

Douglas Baulch: The Wise Tree - Birrarrung Park (1962), Private Collection, Brisbane.

By 1961, Baulch had eight children to support and was forced to continue working as a commercial artist with various companies, while pursuing his true interest in his own time. Many of his works at this time included landscapes with small children in the background.

Douglas Baulch: Dampier Blue (1965), Private Collection, Brisbane.

In 1965, he took a sabbatical to Western Australia around the Coral Coast and Dampier, north Wickham, Roebourne, south Karratha and Barrow Island.

Later in life, Baulch spend more time pursuing his own works while working as a teacher from his home "in East Doncaster, on television, at various TAFEs and at Monash University". He also illustrated the poetry book "Beside My Hearth".

Baulch's style changed somewhat later in life becoming more vivid and colourful.

Due to Baulch's demanding life and circumstances his total number of art works in existence is limited to several hundred individual pieces.

== Exhibitions ==
Baulch had 20 pieces of works on public display for over 20 years at Prahran Technical College from 1940 as a representative of excellence for the college. He also became an ongoing member of the Victorian Artists Society exhibiting numerous times with them.

He exhibited at Victoria Government House (for the Queens visits) in 1964. As well as multiple exhibits at locations around Melbourne, at various state libraries, universities, prize shows, (e.g. Archibald) and financial institutions. Some of his works were also exhibited at the Art Gallery of Western Australia.

His works are currently held in a number of private collections around the world in the UK, US, Belgium, Paris and Hong Kong.

== Personal life and death ==
Baulch married Lyla Foster in 1944. The couple lived at Glen Iris then Armadale.

When he returned from service in the RAAF, they began a large family, with their first child, Jeff, born in 1946. By 1961, Baulch had eight children - Jeff, Graeme, Madeleine, Michael, Francesca, Paul, Kevin and Lisa. However, his son Michael, died young.

After being hospitalised for a year, Baulch died of cancer in February 1996. He was 78.
