= William Mitchell (RAF officer) =

Royal Air Force Air Chief Marshal (1888-1944)

Air Chief Marshal Sir William Mitchell KCB, CBE, DSO, MC, AFC
- Born: 8 March 1888; Cumberland, Australia
- Died: 15 August 1944 (aged 56); Westminster, England
- Military career
- Allegiance: United Kingdom
- Branch: British Army (1906–1918); Royal Air Force (1918–1941)
- Service years: 1906–1941
- Rank: Air Chief Marshal
- Nickname: Mitch
- Commands: Inspector-General of the RAF (1940–1941); RAF Middle East (1939–1940); Air Member for Personnel (1937–1938); British Forces in Iraq (1934–1937); RAF Cranwell (1933–1934); Aden Command (1928–1929); No. 1 Flying Training School (1924–1925); No. 1 (Indian) Wing (1920–1924); No. 52 (Corps) Wing (1920); No. 20 Group (1918–19); 12th (Corps) Wing (1916–1918); No. 10 Squadron (1916)
- Conflicts: First World War: Battle of Loos; Battle of Arras (1917); Waziristan; Second World War
- Awards: Knight Commander of the Order of the Bath; Commander of the Order of the British Empire; Distinguished Service Order; Military Cross; Air Force Cross; Mentioned in Despatches (5)
- Other work: Commandant London Air Training Command; Black Rod

Air Chief Marshal Sir William Gore Sutherland Mitchell, KCB, CBE, DSO, MC, AFC (8 March 1888 – 15 August 1944) was a senior commander in the Royal Air Force (RAF) and the first RAF officer to hold the post of Black Rod.

== RAF career ==
Commissioned into the Devonshire Regiment in 1906, Mitchell spent his early military years as an infantry subaltern. He attended the Central Flying School in 1913, being awarded his Royal Aero Club Aviator's Certificate no. 483 on 17 May 1913, before becoming a pilot in the Royal Flying Corps. During the First World War he saw rapid advancement, serving as Officer Commanding No. 10 Squadron, Officer Commanding 12th (Corps) Wing and Officer Commanding No. 20 Group.

After the war he moved to India and commanded No. 52 (Corps) Wing and No. 3 (Indian) Wing (subsequently redesignated No. 1 (Indian) Wing). He was appointed Officer Commanding, No. 1 Flying Training School in 1924, Group Captain – Administration at RAF Halton in 1925 and Officer Commanding Aden Command in 1928. He went on to be Director of Training at the Air Ministry in 1929 before being made Air Officer Commanding RAF Cranwell in 1933, Air Officer Commanding British Forces in Iraq in 1934 and Air Member for Personnel in 1937.

Mitchell served in the Second World War as Air Officer Commanding-in-Chief RAF Middle East from March 1939, and then Inspector-General of the RAF before retiring in 1941.

In retirement Mitchell served as Gentleman Usher of the Black Rod. He held the post of Commandant of London Air Training Command from 1942 until his death in 1944 from a heart attack, at the age of 56 . He is buried in Putney Vale Cemetery, south west London.

Military offices
New title Command established	Commander, Aden Command; 1928–1929	Succeeded by Cuthbert MacLean
Preceded by Hugh Dowding	Director of Training; 1929–1933	Succeeded by Christopher Courtney
Preceded by Arthur Longmore	RAF College Commandant; 1933–1934	Succeeded by Henry Cave-Browne-Cave
Preceded by Charles Burnett	Air Officer Commanding British Forces in Iraq; 1934–1937	Succeeded by Christopher Courtney
Preceded by Frederick Bowhill	Air Member for Personnel; 1937–1938	Succeeded by Charles Portal
Preceded by Hazelton Nicholl; As Air Officer Commanding	Commander-in-Chief Middle East Command; 1939–1940	Succeeded by Sir Arthur Longmore
Government offices
Preceded by Sir William Pulteney	Black Rod; 1941–1944	Succeeded by Sir Geoffrey Blake
