= Air Defence of Great Britain =

Former command of the Royal Air Force

- Active: 1925–1936; 1943–1944
- Country: United Kingdom
- Branch: Royal Air Force
- Type: Command
- Role: Metropolitan air defence
- Garrison/HQ: Air Ministry, London (1925–1926); Hillingdon House, Uxbridge (1926–1936)

The Air Defence of Great Britain (ADGB) was a Royal Air Force (RAF) command comprising substantial army and RAF elements responsible for the air defence of the British Isles. It lasted from 1925, following recommendations that the RAF take control of metropolitan air defence, until 1936 when it became RAF Fighter Command.

== History ==
The ADGB was created as a command in 1925 as a result of the 1923 recommendation of the Steel–Bartholomew Committee, including their recommendation to transfer responsibility for home air defence from the War Office to the Air Ministry. It main initial elements were:

- The RAF's Metropolitan Air Force, initially comprising 25 squadrons (9 fighter), soon expanding to 52 squadrons (17 fighter)
- 264 heavy AA guns (Royal Artillery) and 672 searchlights (Royal Engineers)
- The new part-time volunteer Observer Corps

ADGB was organised into three defensive zones:

- Inner Artillery Zone (IAZ), over London.
- Air Fighter Zone (AFZ), divided into two areas controlling regular squadrons, the Wessex Bombing Area and the Fighting Area.
- Outer Artillery Zone (OAZ), a narrow belt along the coast from Suffolk to Sussex.

In 1936, ADGB was abolished; the Bombing Area becoming Bomber Command and the Fighting Area becoming Fighter Command and remaining responsible for the ADGB function. The OAZ was abolished and the AFZ expanded. The guns from the OAZ were used for port and base defence and were added to the London defences. The changing threat meant that AA defences were needed for many more potential targets in the British Isles, notably industries important for war production. The AA component became the 1st Anti-Aircraft Division and in 1937 the 2nd Anti-Aircraft Division was formed to defend the Midlands, with Anti-Aircraft Command created to replace the previous Army arrangements.

In 1937, light AA guns were added, the RAF's view that small-calibre artillery were unsuitable having been finally overturned. In 1940, searchlights were transferred from the Royal Engineers to the Royal Artillery. Unrotated Projectile (rocket) batteries were deployed at the beginning of the war. At its peak from 1941–1942, AA Command comprised I, II and III Anti-Aircraft Corps with twelve AA divisions, comprising several hundred regiments. GOC-in-C AA Command for most of the war was General Sir Frederick Pile, the equal in rank of his 'superior' AOC-in-C Fighter Command.

1943

ADGB was resurrected in 1943 for the rump of Fighter Command defending the United Kingdom after the formation of the RAF Second Tactical Air Force in 1943 and AA Command. It was Fighter Command in all but name, and this was finally reflected in 1944 with a return to the previous name.

== Air Officers Commanding-in-Chief 1925–1936 ==
Air Officers Commanding-in-Chief included:

From	To	Name
1 January 1925	26 May 1928	Air Vice Marshal Sir John Salmond
26 May 1928	1 January 1929	Air Vice Marshal Francis Scarlett (temporary appointment)
1 January 1929	5 September 1931	Air Marshal Sir Edward Ellington
5 September 1931	17 January 1933	Air Marshal Sir Geoffrey Salmond
17 January 1933	1 August 1935	Air Marshal Sir Robert Brooke-Popham
1 August 1935	13 July 1936	Air Marshal Sir John Steel

== See also ==
- List of Royal Air Force commands

== Bibliography ==
- Routledge, Brigadier N. W. (1994). A History of the Royal Regiment of Artillery–Anti-Aircraft Artillery, 1914–55. London: Brassey's. ISBN 1-85753-099-3.
