= Directorate of Military Aeronautics =

The Directorate of Military Aeronautics was the British War Office department responsible for military aviation before and during World War I. It functions were subsumed into the Air Ministry when the Royal Air Force was created in 1918.

The Directorate was headed by a Director-General. The following officers held the post:

- Sir David Henderson (1913–17)
- J M Salmond (1917–18)
- E L Ellington (1918)

In 1917 the post of Deputy Director-General of Military Aeronautics was established. The following held that post:

- W S Brancker (1917)
- E L Ellington (1917–18)
