= Edward Ellington =

British Army general and Marshal of the Royal Air Force (1877–1967)

Marshal of the Royal Air Force Sir Edward Ellington GCB CMG CBE
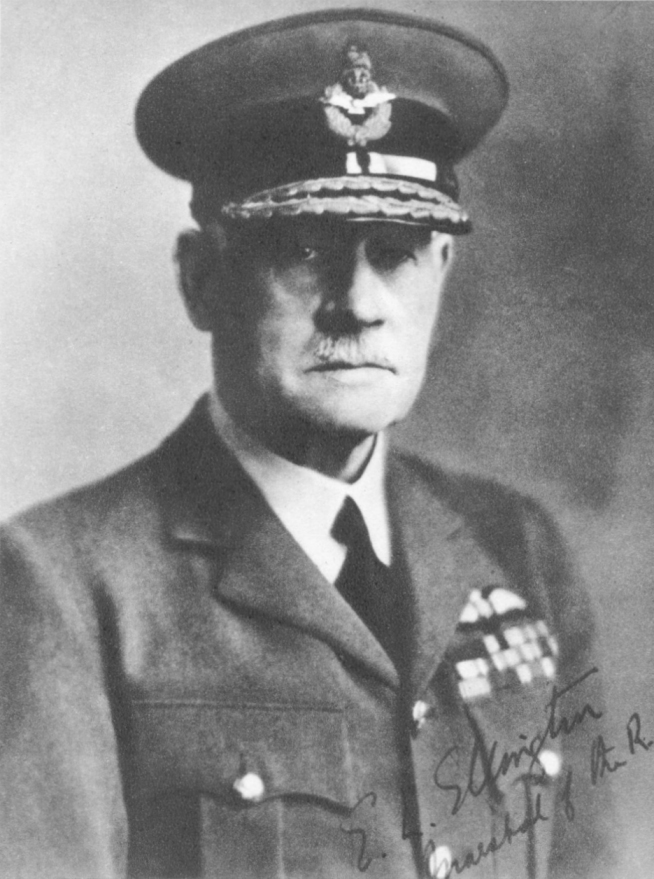
- Born: 30 December 1877; Kensington, London
- Died: 13 June 1967 (aged 89); Wandsworth, London
- Military career
- Allegiance: United Kingdom
- Branch: British Army (1897–1918); Royal Air Force (1918–1940)
- Service years: 1897–1940
- Rank: Marshal of the Royal Air Force
- Commands: Inspector-General of the RAF (1937–1939); Chief of the Air Staff (1933–1937); Air Member for Personnel (1931–1933); Air Defence of Great Britain (1929–1931); Iraq Command (1926–1928); RAF India (1923–1926); RAF Middle East (1922–1923)
- Conflicts: First World War; Second World War
- Awards: Knight Grand Cross of the Order of the Bath; Companion of the Order of St Michael and St George; Commander of the Order of the British Empire; Mentioned in Despatches (4); Knight of the Legion of Honour (France); Order of Saint Stanislaus, 2nd Class (Russia)

Marshal of the Royal Air Force Sir Edward Leonard Ellington, GCB, CMG, CBE (30 December 1877 – 13 June 1967) was a senior officer in the Royal Air Force. He served in the First World War as a staff officer and then as director-general of military aeronautics and subsequently as controller-general of equipment. In the inter-war years he held command positions in the Middle East, in India and then in Iraq. He served as Chief of the Air Staff in the mid-1930s and in that role he implemented a plan, known as 'Scheme F'. This scheme implemented an increase in the size of the Royal Air Force to 187 squadrons (five bomber squadrons for every two fighter squadrons, reflecting the dominance of the bomber strategy at the time) within three years to counter the threat from Hitler's Germany. He also broke up the command known as "Air Defence of Great Britain" to create RAF Fighter Command, RAF Bomber Command, RAF Coastal Command and RAF Training Command. He then served as Inspector-General of the RAF until his retirement in 1940.

== Early career ==
Born the son of Edward Bayzand Ellington and Marion Florence (née Leonard), Ellington was educated at Clifton College. After attending the Royal Military Academy Woolwich, Ellington was commissioned into the Royal Field Artillery on 1 September 1897. He was promoted to lieutenant on 1 September 1900 and to captain on 27 April 1904. After attending the Royal Naval War College, Portsmouth in 1908, he was posted to the War Office on 24 August 1909 and became a staff officer there on 9 August 1910. He learned to fly in 1912 and was awarded Royal Aero Club certificate No. 305 on 1 October 1912. He went on to be secretary to the Air Committee in November 1912 and a staff officer in the Directorate of Military Aeronautics in May 1913 and was then transferred to the Reserve of the Royal Flying Corps on 17 December 1913.

== First World War ==
When the First World War started, Ellington was under training at the Central Flying School. On 5 October 1914, he was sent, not to a flying post but to be the Deputy Assistant Quartermaster-General at the headquarters of the British Expeditionary Force in France. On 6 March 1915 he was granted a brevet promotion to lieutenant colonel and posted as the assistant adjutant and quartermaster-general of the 2nd Cavalry Division.

Ellington then served as a staff officer, from 22 July 1915 with the 2nd Army, then, from 5 February 1916 with the department of the Chief of the Imperial General Staff, and finally from 14 January 1917 with the General Staff of the VIII Corps. On 20 November 1917 he was made the deputy director-general of military aeronautics under Major General John Salmond at the War Office. Ellington succeeded John Salmond as director-general on 18 January 1918, holding the post until it was disestablished with the creation of the Royal Air Force in April 1918. He was promoted to the temporary rank of major general and appointed acting Controller-General of Equipment in April 1918, becoming substantive in that post in August 1918.

Ellington was appointed a Companion of the Order of St Michael and St George on 3 June 1916 and awarded the Russian Order of Saint Stanislaus, 2nd Class on 1 June 1917. He was appointed a Companion of the Order of the Bath for services during the war on 1 January 1919.

== Inter-war years ==
Ellington as the Director-General of Aircraft Production and Research.

Ellington's role was re-designated as Director-General of Supply and Research in April 1919 and, having been appointed a Commander of the Order of the British Empire on 3 June 1919, he was awarded a permanent commission in the Royal Air Force as a major general in August 1919 (shortly afterwards redesignated as an air vice marshal). Advanced to Knight Commander of the Order of the Bath in the 1920 Birthday Honours he became Air Officer Commanding RAF Middle East in March 1922. He went on to be Air Officer Commanding RAF India in November 1923 and put down a rebellion by Mahsuds on the North West Frontier in what became known as Pink's War. He became Air Officer Commanding RAF Iraq in November 1926, in which role he undertook peace keeping operations following a revolt led by Sheikh Mahmud Barzanji in 1927, and then became Air Officer Commanding-in-Chief Air Defence of Great Britain in February 1929 with promotion to air marshal on 1 July 1929. He was appointed Principal Air Aide-de-Camp to the King on 27 February 1930 and became Air Member for Personnel on 26 September 1931, receiving promotion to air chief marshal on 1 January 1933.

Ellington was appointed Chief of the Air Staff on 22 May 1933. He succeeded Marshal of the Royal Air Force Sir John Salmond, who was acting in the role following the sudden death of his brother Air Chief Marshal Sir Geoffrey Salmond, who had only become Chief of the Air Staff in April. In that role he implemented a plan, known as 'Scheme F', to increase the size of the Royal Air Force to 187 squadrons (five bomber squadrons for every two fighter squadrons reflecting the dominance of the bomber strategy at the time) within three years to counter the threat from Hitler's Germany. To facilitate expansion, he reorganized the Home RAF commands forming RAF Fighter Command, RAF Bomber Command and RAF Training Command from Air Defence of Great Britain, Inland Command, RAF Cranwell (RAF Cadet College), and RAF Halton (No 1 School of Technical Training (Apprentices)) and renaming Coastal Area as RAF Coastal Command. He was advanced to Knight Grand Cross of the Order of the Bath in the 1935 Birthday Honours. He attended the funeral of King George V in January 1936 and, having been promoted to marshal of the Royal Air Force on 1 January 1937, he attended the coronation of George VI in May 1937.

Following completion of his term as Chief of the Air Staff, Ellington became Inspector-General of the RAF on 1 September 1937. It was in his capacity as inspector-general that in 1938 Ellington visited Australia to investigate standards in the Royal Australian Air Force. His report strongly criticised the RAAF's operational capability and safety standards. Following the publication of the report in July 1938, the Australian Government dismissed Air Vice Marshal Richard Williams from his post as RAAF Chief of the Air Staff. In July 1939 Ellington was augmented in his post as inspector-general by Air Marshal Sir Charles Burnett, who would become the RAAF's Chief of the Air Staff in 1940.

Ellington retired on 4 April 1940, shortly after the start of the Second World War. He attended the coronation of Queen Elizabeth II in June 1953 and died on 13 June 1967 from coronary thrombosis at Scio House Hospital in London.

== Sources ==
- Probert, Henry (1991). High Commanders of the Royal Air Force. HMSO. ISBN 0-11-772635-4.
- Weston, Air Vice Marshal Brian (2003). "The Australian Aviation Industry – History and Achievements Guiding Defence and Aviation Policy" (PDF). Commonwealth of Australia.

Military offices
Preceded by Sefton Brancker	Deputy Director-General of Military Aeronautics; November 1917 – January 1918	Unknown
Preceded by John Salmond	Director-General of Military Aeronautics; 18 January 1918 – c. April 1918	Post disestablished
Preceded by Sefton Brancker	RAF Controller-General of Equipment; Acting Controller-General of Equipment from 10 April 1918; Post renamed Director-General of Aircraft Production and Research in February 1919; Post renamed Director-General of Supply and Research on 1 April 1919; 22 August 1918 – 23 February 1922	Succeeded by Sir Geoffrey Salmond
Preceded by Sir Geoffrey Salmond	Air Officer Commanding Middle East Area; AOC Middle East Command from 1 April 1922; 1922–1923	Succeeded by Oliver Swann
Preceded by Philip Game	Air Officer Commanding RAF India; 1923–1926	Succeeded by Sir Geoffrey Salmond
Preceded by Sir John Higgins	Air Officer Commanding Iraq Command; 1926–1928	Succeeded by Sir Robert Brooke-Popham
Preceded by Francis Scarlett	Commander-in-Chief Air Defence of Great Britain; 1929–1931	Succeeded by Sir Geoffrey Salmond
Preceded by Sir Tom Webb-Bowen	Air Member for Personnel; 1931–1933	Succeeded by Sir Frederick Bowhill
Preceded by Sir John Salmond	Chief of the Air Staff; 1933–1937	Succeeded by Sir Cyril Newall
Preceded by Sir Robert Brooke-Popham	Inspector-General of the RAF; 1937–1939	Succeeded by Sir Charles Burnett
