= John Tyssen =

Royal Air Force Air Vice-Marshal (1889–1953)

- Born: 20 June 1889
- Died: 4 January 1953 (aged 63)
- Military career
- Allegiance: United Kingdom
- Branch: British Army (1907–18); Royal Air Force (1918–42)
- Service years: 1907–42
- Rank: Air vice-marshal
- Commands: No. 16 Group (1940–42); British Forces in Iraq (1937– 39); No. 12 Group (1937); RAF Gosport (1930–35); RAF Tangmere (1926–28); No. 5 Wing (1923–24); No. 20 Squadron (1920–23); No. 58 Squadron (1918); No. 26 Squadron (1917–18)
- Conflicts: First World War; Second World War
- Awards: Companion of the Order of the Bath; Military Cross; Mentioned in dispatches

Air Vice-Marshal John Hugh Samuel Tyssen, CB, MC (20 June 1889 – 4 January 1953) was a British Royal Flying Corps pilot during the First World War and a senior Royal Air Force commander during the first half of the Second World War. He was Air Officer Commanding British Forces in Iraq (20 November 1937 – November 1939)

Military offices
Vacant Title last held by Francis Scarlett	Air Officer Commanding No. 12 Group (temporary appointment); 1937	Succeeded by Trafford Leigh-Mallory
Preceded by Reginald Marix	Air Officer Commanding No. 16 Group; 1940–1942	Succeeded by Ivor Lloyd
