= Frederick Halahan =

Air Vice-Marshal Frederick Halahan CMG CBE DSO MVO DL
- Born: 27 May 1880; Camberwell, Surrey
- Died: 17 October 1965 (aged 85); Battle, East Sussex
- Military career
- Allegiance: United Kingdom
- Branch: Royal Navy (1894–18); Royal Air Force (1918–31)
- Service years: 1894–1930, 1939-?
- Rank: Air Vice Marshal
- Commands: RAF College Cranwell (1926–29); No. 5 Group (1918)
- Conflicts: First World War; Second World War
- Awards: Companion of the Order of St Michael and St George; Commander of the Order of the British Empire; Distinguished Service Order; Member of the Royal Victorian Order; Mentioned in Despatches; Commander of the Order of the Crown (Belgium); Croix de guerre (Belgium); Officer of the Legion of Honour (France)

Air Vice-Marshal Frederick Crosby Halahan, CMG, CBE, DSO, MVO, DL (27 May 1880 – 17 October 1965) was a gunnery officer in the Royal Navy during the early years of the 20th century who became involved in early naval aviation efforts.

== Naval and Air Force service ==
Halahan served in the Royal Navy, and was promoted lieutenant on 15 December 1900. He later served through the First World War with the navy and in the Royal Air Force from its establishment in 1918 through to 1930, including posting as commandant of the Royal Air Force College Cranwell in 1926–29. During the Second World War, Halahan rejoined the RAF, serving on the staff of the Directorate of Personal Services.

== Screen portrayal ==
Halahan was portrayed by Walter Hudd in the 1956 film Reach for the Sky as the Cranwell commandant who gives a friendly reprimand to young Douglas Bader for his disregard for service discipline and flight rules. Despite that Bader successfully completed his training and was posted to No. 23 Squadron at RAF Kenley before he famously lost his legs.

Military offices
Preceded by Amyas Borton	Commandant Royal Air Force College Cranwell; 1926–1929	Succeeded by Arthur Longmore
