= Geoffrey Salmond =

Royal Air Force air marshal (1878–1933)

Air Chief Marshal Sir Geoffrey Salmond KCB KCMG DSO
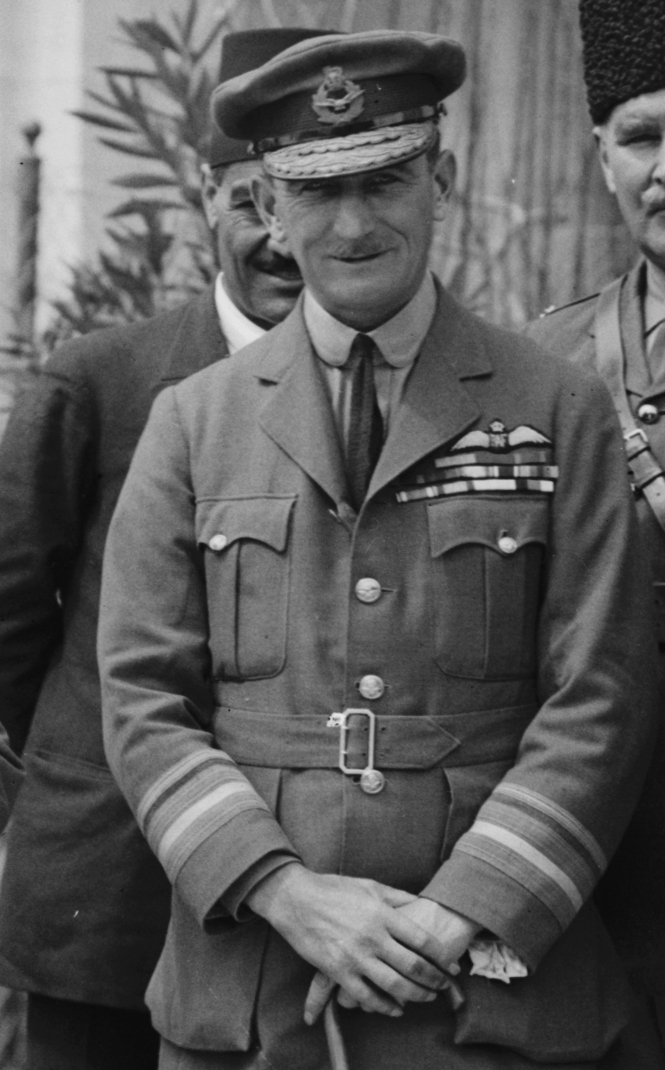
- Air Vice Marshal Sir Geoffrey Salmond in 1920
- Born: William Geoffrey Hanson Salmond; 19 August 1878; Hougham, Kent, England
- Died: 27 April 1933 (aged 54); King Edward VII Hospital for Officers, St. Marylebone, London, England
- Relatives: Major General Sir William Salmond (father); Marshal of the Royal Air Force Sir John Salmond (brother); Gwen Salmond (sister); Anne Baker (daughter)
- Military career
- Allegiance: United Kingdom
- Branch: British Army (1898–18); Royal Air Force (1918–33)
- Service years: 1898–1933
- Rank: Air Chief Marshal
- Commands: Chief of the Air Staff (1933); Air Defence of Great Britain (1931–33); RAF India (1926–31); Air Member for Supply and Research (1922–26); RAF Middle East Area (1917–22); Palestine Brigade RFC (1917); Middle East Brigade RFC (1916–17); 5th Wing RFC (1915–16); No. 1 Squadron RFC (1915)
- Conflicts: Second Boer War; First World War
- Awards: Knight Commander of the Order of the Bath; Knight Commander of the Order of St Michael and St George; Companion of the Distinguished Service Order; Mentioned in Despatches (7); Order of Saint Stanislaus, 3rd Class (Russia); Grand Officer of the Order of the Nile (Egypt); Grand Commander of the Order of the Redeemer (Greece)

Air Chief Marshal Sir William Geoffrey Hanson Salmond, KCB, KCMG, DSO (19 August 1878 – 27 April 1933) was a senior commander in the Royal Flying Corps during the First World War. Remaining in the Royal Air Force after the war, he held senior appointments in the Middle East, Great Britain, and India. In late 1928 and early 1929, he directed the evacuation from Kabul of British embassy staff and others, by air.

In 1933, Salmond served as Chief of the Air Staff for only a matter of days before being taken ill and subsequently dying from cancer.

== Early life and education ==
Geoffrey Salmond was born on 19 August 1878 to Major General Sir William Salmond and Emma Mary Salmond (née Hoyle). His siblings included a brother, John, and a sister Gwen. He was educated at Aysgarth School followed by Wellington College in Berkshire before joining the Army.

== Royal Artillery service ==
Salmond joined the British Army, undertaking his officer training at Royal Military Academy Woolwich around 1897. He was commissioned into the Royal Artillery on 23 June 1898 and saw active service during the Second Boer War. He took part in the relief of Ladysmith and the operations on the Tugela Heights. He received the Queen's Medal and seven clasps, then on 10 November 1900 he was sent to China and gained a medal for the operations during the Boxer Rebellion there. He was seconded to study Japanese on 2 May 1905 and promoted to captain on 2 December 1905. He was then appointed Adjutant with the Royal Field Artillery on 4 February 1908. Then in 1911 he attended the Staff College, Camberley.

== Royal Flying Corps service ==
Salmond was awarded Royal Aero Club Aviator's Certificate no. 421 on 18 February 1913, and then joined the reserve of the Royal Flying Corps on 17 April 1913. He became a staff office at the War Office on 31 July 1913, a staff officer in the Directorate of Military Aeronautics on 31 August 1913 and then a staff officer at Headquarters Royal Flying Corps in France on 4 August 1914.

Salmond went on to take up the post of Officer Commanding No. 1 Squadron RFC on 26 January 1915. In the First World War the squadron operated over the Western Front and Salmond and his squadron took part in the Battle of Neuve Chapelle, including the Battle of Hill 60 and the Battle of Aubers Ridge. He was appointed a wing commander on 18 August 1915 and sent to command the Fifth Wing in Egypt in November 1916. He was promoted to brevet lieutenant colonel on 3 June 1916.

In July 1916, Salmond was promoted to temporary brigadier general and given command of the RFC in the Middle East. He was appointed a Companion of the Distinguished Service Order on 3 March 1917:

for conspicuous ability and devotion to duty when personally directing the work of the Royal Flying Corps during the action. The striking success attained was largely due to his magnificent personal example.

The action referred to was during the operations in Sinai at the end of 1916. In this command he was responsible for providing air cooperation for General Jan Smuts's force in East Africa, for the forces in Salonika and Mesopotamia, for Allenby's conquest of Palestine, and for the RFC in India. He was promoted to the substantive rank of lieutenant colonel on 3 September 1918.

While holding the command of the Middle East, he had laid out an airway from Cairo to South Africa, clearing a chain of aerodromes in Central Africa. His idea was to send a demonstration flight or flights of RAF aircraft across Africa, thus providing the link of which Cecil Rhodes had dreamed in a Cape-to-Cairo railway. Salmond contemplated flights by both landplane and flying-boat. He was not destined to put his idea into execution, though his airway was used by Sir Pierre van Ryneveld and Sir Christopher Brand on their first flight to South Africa. In 1918, he flew the route from Cairo to Delhi in under two days. He was appointed a Grand Officer of the Egyptian Order of the Nile on 9 November 1918, a Companion of the Order of the Bath in the 1919 New Year Honours, and a Grand Commander of the Greek Order of the Redeemer on 5 April 1919. He was appointed a Knight Commander of the Order of St Michael and St George on 3 June 1919 and mentioned in despatches on account of his services in the Middle East on 28 June 1919.

== Royal Air Force service ==
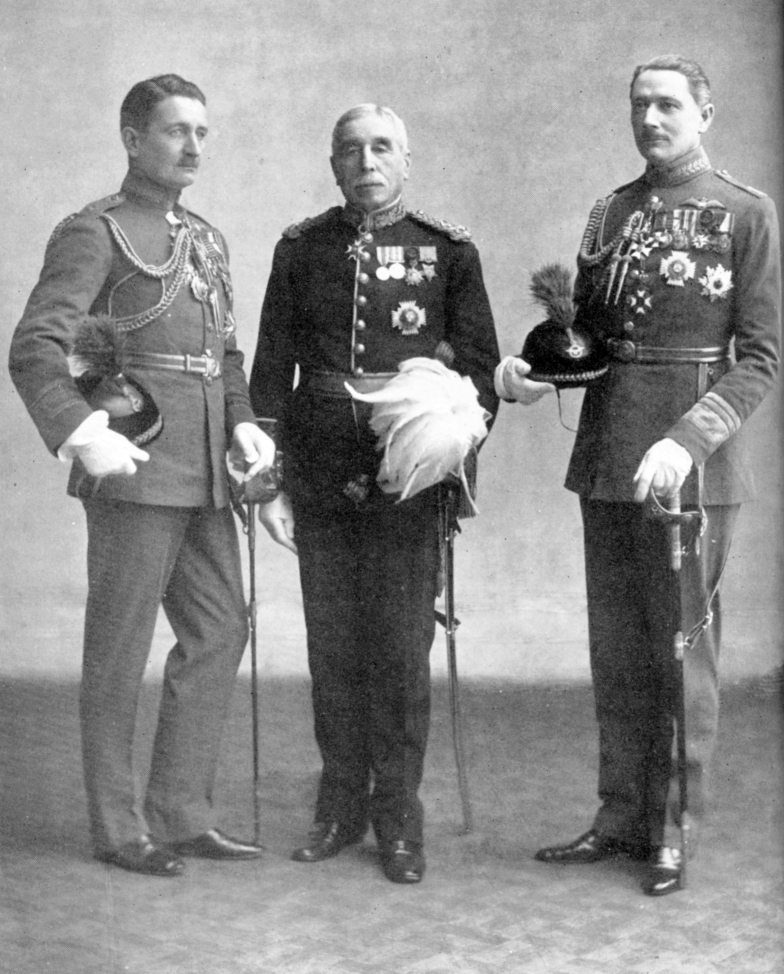
Geoffrey (pictured left) with his father and brother John

Salmond was awarded a permanent commission in the Royal Air Force as a major general in August 1919 (shortly afterwards redesignated as an air vice marshal). On 23 February 1922 Salmond returned to Great Britain to take up the post of Director-General of Supply and Research at the Air Ministry. The following year, his post was renamed Air Member for Supply and Research and he remained as the head of Supply and Research for the RAF until late 1926. He was advanced to Knight Commander of the Order of the Bath in the 1926 Birthday Honours.

Salmond's next appointment was as Air Officer Commanding India in December 1926. That month, eight years after producing the flight path from Egypt to India, he boarded Imperial's first planned passenger flight from Croydon to Karachi. In late 1928 and early 1929, he directed the evacuation from Kabul of British embassy staff and others. He was promoted to air marshal on 1 July 1929.

As Air Officer Commanding in India, Salmond submitted a 1927 report advocating for an independent Indian Air Force — a visionary proposal that predated the IAF's actual formation by five years. His role in laying the groundwork for indigenous air power in British India has been explored in retrospective analyses.

In September 1931, Salmond returned from India to take up command of the Air Defence of Great Britain organization which was responsible for British air defences, including both fighters and bombers. He was promoted to air chief marshal several months later on 1 January 1933.

On 1 April 1933, Air Chief Marshal Salmond took over from his brother John as Chief of the Air Staff. Salmond had become severely unwell and days later (5 April) arrangements were announced for Sir John Salmond to resume the RAF's senior post temporarily.

== Family ==
In 1910 he married Margaret Carr, daughter of William Carr; they had a son and three daughters. His daughter Anne wrote a biography of Salmond, published in 2003. She died aged 111 in 2025.

== Death ==
Salmond died on 27 April 1933 and Sir John carried on his duties as Chief of the Air Staff for several more weeks afterwards. Salmond had a large funeral procession with Trenchard as one of the pallbearers.

== Publications ==
- Salmond, Sir Geoffrey (1929). Report on the Air Operations in Afghanistan Between December 12th, 1928, and February 25th, 1929. London: Her Majesty's Stationery Office.

Military offices
Preceded by Charles Longcroft	Officer Commanding No. 1 Squadron RFC; January – August 1915	Succeeded by Philip Joubert de la Ferté
Unknown	Officer Commanding Fifth Wing, RFC; 1915–1916	Succeeded by Philip Joubert de la Ferté
New title Middle East Brigade established	General Officer Commanding Middle East Brigade; Post upgraded to GOC HQ RFC Middle East from October 1917; 1916–1917	Succeeded by Sefton Brancker
New title Palestine Brigade established	Officer Commanding Palestine Brigade; October – November 1917	Succeeded by Sefton Brancker
Preceded by Sefton Brancker	General Officer Commanding HQ RFC Middle East; From 1 April 1918 GOC RAF Middle East Area; From 18 March 1920 AOC Middle East Area; 1917–1922	Succeeded by Edward Ellington
Preceded by Sir Edward Ellington	RAF Director-General of Supply and Research; Post renamed Air Member for Supply and Research in 1923; 1922–1926	Succeeded by Sir John Higgins
Preceded by Sir Edward Ellington	Air Officer Commanding RAF India; 1926–1931	Succeeded by Sir John Steel
Preceded by Sir Edward Ellington	Commander-in-Chief Air Defence of Great Britain; 1931–1933	Succeeded by Sir Robert Brooke-Popham
Preceded by Sir John Salmond	Chief of the Air Staff; 1933	Succeeded by Sir John Salmond
