= Sefton Brancker =

British Army general (1877–1930)

Air Vice-Marshal Sir Sefton Brancker KCB AFC
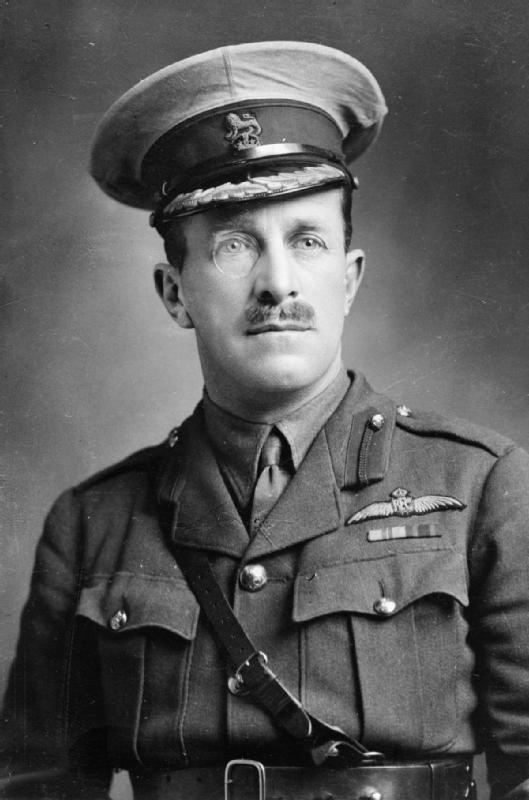
- Brancker, c. 1915–1918
- Born: William Sefton Brancker; 22 March 1877; Woolwich, Kent, England
- Died: 5 October 1930 (aged 53); Allonne near Beauvais, France
- Relatives: Wife: May Wynn Field
- Military career
- Allegiance: United Kingdom
- Branch: British Army (1896–1918); Royal Air Force (1918–1919)
- Service years: 1896–1919
- Rank: Air Vice-Marshal
- Commands: Master-General of Personnel (1918–1919); Controller-General of Equipment (1918); HQ RFC Middle East (1917); Palestine Brigade (1917); Northern (Training) Brigade (1915–1916); No. 3 Wing (1915)
- Conflicts: Second Boer War; First World War
- Awards: Knight Commander of the Order of the Bath; Air Force Cross; Officer of the Legion of Honour (France); Order of St. Vladimir, 4th Class (Russia); Order of Saint Stanislaus, 1st Class (Russia); Commander of the Order of the Crown (Italy); Commander of the Order of Leopold (Belgium)
- Other work: British Director of Civil Aviation

Air Vice-Marshal Sir William Sefton Brancker, KCB AFC (22 March 1877 – 5 October 1930) was a British pioneer in civil and military aviation and senior officer of the Royal Flying Corps and later Royal Air Force. He was killed in an airship crash in 1930, exactly 20 years after his first flight.

== Early life ==
Sefton Brancker was born in Woolwich, the eldest son of Col. William Godeffroy Brancker and Hester Adelaide, the daughter of Major General Henry Charles Russell. Brancker grew up as the elder of two brothers; their father died in 1885. From 1891 to 1894, the young Brancker attended Bedford School. His father was born in Hamburg to a British father and German mother; the Branckers were a long-established Anglo-German family that had lived in England for several generations.

On 7 April 1907, he married May Wynne, the daughter of Colonel Spencer Field of the Royal Warwickshire regiment; they had one son, also called William Sefton Brancker.

== Military career ==
Brancker was trained for the British Army at Woolwich, joining the Royal Artillery in 1896. He served in the Second Boer War and later in India, where he made his first flight in 1910. On 18 June 1913 he was awarded the Royal Aero Club's Aviator's Certificate no. 525.

During the First World War, Brancker held important posts in the Royal Flying Corps, including Director of Military Aeronautics. In late 1915 a brigade system was introduced in the RFC, and Brancker was promoted to brigadier general and appointed to command the Northern Training Brigade, with his headquarters in Birmingham. This appointment was to be short-lived, as in early 1916 he was appointed Director of Air Organisation in London. In 1917, he briefly served as the General Officer Commanding Royal Flying Corps's Palestine Headquarters and then its Middle East headquarters. Promoted to major general in 1918, he became Controller-General of Equipment in January of that year and Master-General of Personnel in August 1918. On 23 August 1918 he resigned his commission in the Army and was granted a permanent commission as major-general in the RAF. He was appointed Knight Commander of the Order of the Bath on 1 January 1919 and retired from the RAF with the rank of major-general on 13 January following. He was granted the rank of air vice-marshal in 1924.

== Civil aviation ==
On 11 May 1922 he was made Director of Civil Aviation, and worked assiduously to stimulate British interest in the subject among local authorities and flying clubs. He encouraged Manchester and other cities to construct municipal airports and airfields. He participated in several long-distance survey flights, notably with Alan Cobham. He was an ardent supporter of the development of British civilian air services connecting London to British colonies and dominions overseas.

Brancker was chairman of the Royal Aero Club's (RAeC) Racing Committee from 1921 to 1930, and his dynamic leadership led to the RAeC forming the Light Aero Club scheme in 1925, which helped provide the British clubs with examples of such new and improved aircraft types as the de Havilland Moth and Avro Avian.

== Death ==
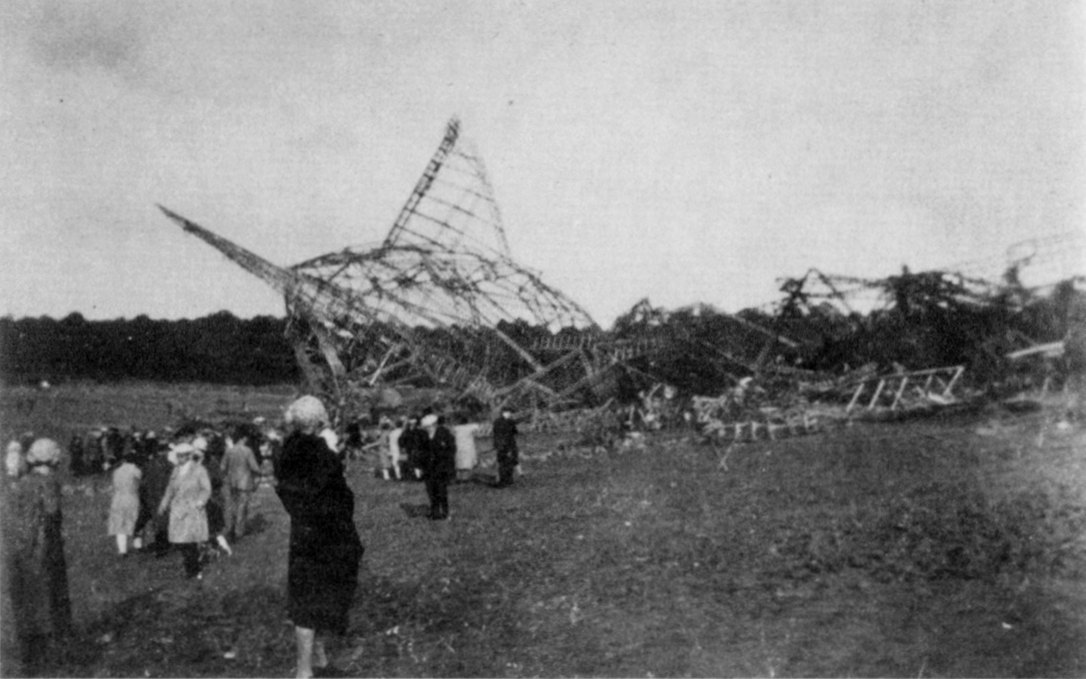
The wreckage of R101

Together with Lord Thomson, the Air Minister, Brancker was killed when the airship R101 crashed near Beauvais, France, on 5 October 1930, during its maiden voyage to India. His death occurred on the 20th anniversary of his first flight.

== Legacy ==
In 1952, British European Airways named its 'Pionair' (Douglas DC-3) G-AKNB "Sir Sefton Brancker" to mark his substantial contribution to the development of British aviation.

In 1996, British Airways (BA) named one of its newly delivered Boeing 777s (G-ZZZB) "Sir William Sefton Branker" [sic] in recognition of his work. Other 777s in the BA fleet were named after aviation pioneers, for example "Wilbur and Orville Wright" and "Sir Frank Whittle".

Kenmore Park housing estate in Kenton, Harrow, has a number of its roads named after aviators including Brancker.

Brancker Road in Plymouth was named in his honour during build in the mid 1930s.

Military offices
New title Directorate established	Assistant Director of Military Aeronautics; Deputy Director from March 1915; 1913–1915	Succeeded by John Fulton
Preceded by John Higgins	Officer Commanding No. 3 Wing; August – December 1915	Unknown
New title Brigade established	Brigadier-General Commanding Northern (Training) Brigade; December 1915 – February 1916	Unknown
New title Post created	Director of Air Organization; March 1916–1917	Succeeded by Lionel Charlton
New title	Deputy Director-General of Military Aeronautics; February – November 1917	Succeeded by Edward Ellington
Preceded by Geoffrey Salmond	Officer Commanding Palestine Brigade; November – December 1917	Succeeded by Amyas Borton
Preceded by Geoffrey Salmond	General Officer Commanding HQ RFC Middle East; November – December 1917	Succeeded by Geoffrey Salmond
New title Air Council established	RAF Controller-General of Equipment; January – August 1918	Succeeded by Edward Ellington
Preceded by Sir Godfrey Paine	RAF Master-General of Personnel; 1918–1919	Vacant Title next held by Cecil Lambert; As Director of Personnel
Government offices
Preceded by Sir Frederick Sykes; As Controller	Director of Civil Aviation; 1922–1930	Succeeded by Sir Francis Shelmerdine
Professional and academic associations
Preceded by Lord Weir	President of the Royal Aeronautical Society; 1926-1927	Succeeded by William Forbes-Sempill
Notes and references
1. A complete list of Brancker's military appointments can be found in Appendix I to Brancker, Sefton (1935). Macmillan, Norman, ed. Sir Sefton Brancker. London: William Heinemann Ltd. pp. 420 to 425.
