= William Maitland (civil servant) =

Scottish cricketer

Personal information
- Full name: William James Maitland
- Born: 22 July 1847; Edinburgh, Midlothian, Scotland
- Died: 8 May 1919 (aged 71); Westminster, London, England
- Batting: Right-handed

Domestic team information
- Years: Team
- 1868–1869: Marylebone Cricket Club

Career statistics
| Competition | First-class |
|---|---|
| Matches | 3 |
| Runs scored | 71 |
| Batting average | 23.66 |
| 100s/50s | –/1 |
| Top score | 57 |
| Catches/stumpings | 2/– |
- Source: Cricinfo, 2 August 2019

William James Maitland CIE (22 July 1847 – 8 May 1919) was a British civil servant in India and a Scottish first-class cricketer.

The son of Augustus Maitland and his wife, Elizabeth Jane Richards, he was born at Edinburgh in July 1847. He was educated in Edinburgh at the Edinburgh Academy. He made his debut in first-class cricket for the Marylebone Cricket Club (MCC) against Cambridge University at Lord's in 1868, scoring a half century with 57 on debut. He made two further appearances in first-class cricket in 1869, playing for the Gentlemen of England against Oxford University at Oxford, and for the MCC against Surrey at The Oval. He married Agnes Magdalene Neville-Grenville in August 1878, with the couple having two children, a son, Alexander, who died young, and a daughter, Marjorie, who married Air Chief Marshal Sir Arthur Murray Longmore. Maitland later moved to British India, where he served as the private secretary for the Secretary of State for India. He was made a Companion to the Order of the Indian Empire in February 1887. He later served as the deputy government director of the Indian Railways from 1892 to 1912. He died in a nursing home at Westminster in May 1919.
