= RAF Middle East Command =

Former command of the Royal Air Force

- Active: December 1941 – December 1943
- Country: United Kingdom
- Branch: Royal Air Force
- Type: Command
- Role: Control of RAF forces in the Middle East

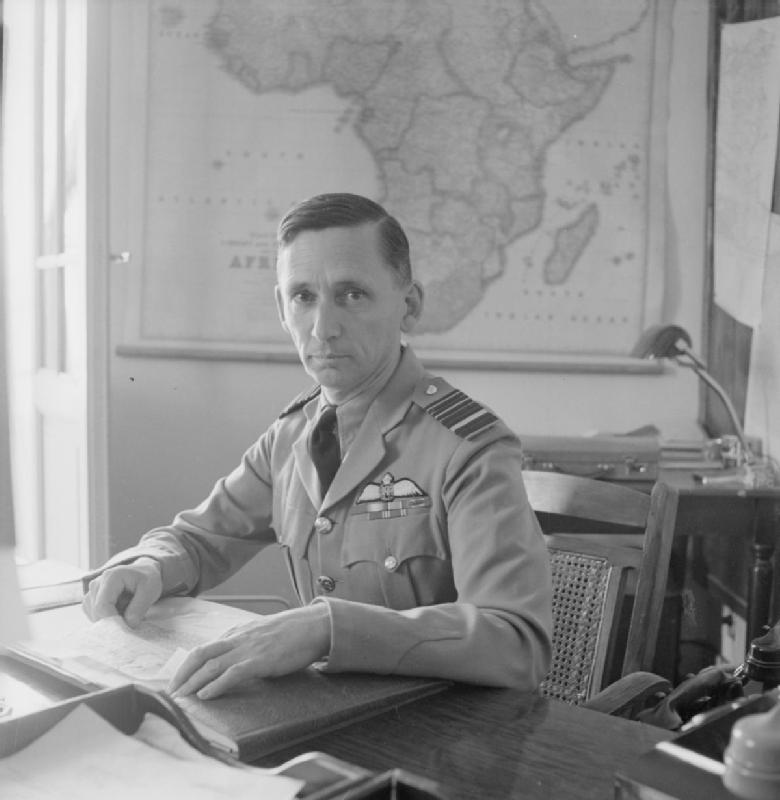
Air Commander-in-Chief of Middle East Command Air Chief Marshal Sir Arthur Tedder at Air House, his official residence in Cairo, Egypt, in March 1942.

Middle East Command was a command of the Royal Air Force (RAF) that was active during the Second World War. It had been preceded by RAF Middle East, which was established in 1918 by the redesignation of HQ Royal Flying Corps Middle East that had been activated in 1917 although a small Royal Flying Corps presence had been operational in the region since 1914.

RAF Middle East Command was formed on 29 December 1941 following the redesignation of RAF Middle East. During the early part of the Second World War, the Command was one of the three British commands in the Middle East, the others being the British Army's Middle East Command and the Royal Navy's Mediterranean Fleet. On 15 February 1943, RAF Middle East Command became a major sub-command of the Mediterranean Air Command (MAC), the Allied formation that also included non-RAF units.

== RAF history in the Middle East ==
The RAF presence in the Middle East from the time of the First World War was similar to that of the Middle East Command of the British Army, with operational responsibility for Egypt, the Sudan and Kenya, and administrative responsibility for Palestine and Transjordan. Separate RAF Commands held operational responsibility for Iraq and Aden while RAF Mediterranean held responsibility for Malta. However, interwar planning held that in times of war, Middle East Command would assume control over all of these commands.

A small Royal Flying Corps presence was deployed to the Middle East in late 1914. By 1 July 1916 this force had grown sufficiently to be raised to a brigade as Middle East Brigade. By December 1917 Middle East Brigade had grown to become HQ RFC Middle East which was renamed to RAF Middle East in April 1918. It renamed again to RAF Middle East Area in March 1920, then back to RAF Middle East in April 1922, and finally became RAF Middle East Command on 29 December 1941.

From mid-February until MAC was disbanded on 10 December 1943, the Command consisted of the following sub-commands with their initial commanders indicated:

- No. 201 (Naval Co-Operation) Group under Air Vice Marshal Thomas Langford-Sainsbury;
- Air Headquarters (AHQ) Air Defences Eastern Mediterranean under Air Vice Marshal Richard Saul;
- 9th Air Force under Major General Lewis H. Brereton;
- Headquarters (HQ) British Forces Aden under Air Vice Marshal Frank MacNamara VC (RAAF);
- Air Headquarters (AHQ) East Africa under Air Vice Marshal Harold Kerby;
- Air Headquarters (AHQ) Levant under Air Commodore Bernard McEntegart; and
- Air Headquarters (AHQ) Iraq and Persia under Air Vice Marshal Hugh Champion de Crespigny

However, during this period of the Second World War, Middle East Command was distinct from the other major sub-commands of MAC:

- Northwest African Air Forces under Lieutenant General Carl Spaatz;
- AHQ Malta under Air Vice Marshal Sir Keith Park; and
- RAF Gibraltar under Air Vice Marshal Sturley Simpson.

Accordingly, Middle East Command was primarily responsible for operations in the Eastern part of the Middle East during the war.

It was during the critical campaigns in Egypt and Libya during 1942 that Air Chief Marshal Sir Arthur Tedder, as Air Commander-in-Chief of RAF Middle East, successfully coordinated his strategic, coastal, and tactical air forces consisting primarily of No. 205 (Heavy Bomber) Group, No. 201 (Naval Co-operation) Group, and especially Air Vice Marshal Arthur Coningham's Air Headquarters (AHQ) Western Desert, respectively. The success of the Tedder-Coningham air interdiction during the desert war was the model upon which the Northwest African Air Forces were created at the Casablanca Conference in January 1943.

Earlier, Tedder had been Churchill's default choice as Air Officer Commanding in Chief of RAF Middle East when his first choice, Air Vice-Marshal Owen Boyd was captured. But soon after Tedder assumed command in June 1941, he made the following statement that not only characterized his mission in the Middle East, but the organization of the Mediterranean Air Command in early 1943 and nearly all future air forces:

"In my opinion, sea, land and air operations in the Middle East Theatre are now so closely inter-related that effective coordination will only be possible if the campaign is considered and controlled as a combined operation in the full sense of that term."

The concept itself was certainly not a new one, but putting it into practice under the military dogma and commander egos of the day was easier said than done. Throughout 1942 in particular, the coordination and flexibility exercised between Coningham's Western Desert Air Force (WDAF) and the 8th Army has been contrasted with the more rigid relationship between the Luftwaffe and German ground forces. During the first week of July, 1942, WDAF flew 5,458 sorties against Axis forces, using the innovative tactic of leap-frogging airfields, and Erwin Rommel informed Berlin on 4 July that he was abandoning his El Alamein offensive to concentrate on defence. Later, the tactic of bombing known as Tedder's carpet was developed.

=== 1943 ===
On 15 February 1943, the Command under Air Chief Marshal Sir Sholto Douglas became a major sub-command of the Mediterranean Air Command (MAC), the official Allied air force reorganisation established at the Casablanca Conference in January 1943. Douglas took over Middle East Command when its previous commander, Air Chief Marshal Sir Arthur Tedder was named Air Commander-in-Chief of MAC. For Middle East operations, Tedder reported to the British Chiefs of Staff.

=== 1945 ===
Middle East Command was absorbed into RAF Mediterranean and Middle East on 1 August 1945.

== Commanders-in-Chief ==
HQ RFC Middle East

- Major General Sir William Sefton Brancker, 14 December 1917
- Major General Sir William Geoffrey Hanson Salmond, 3 January 1918

RAF Middle East

- Major General/Air Vice Marshal Sir William Geoffrey Hanson Salmond, 18 March 1920

RAF Middle East Area

- Air Vice Marshal Sir William Geoffrey Hanson Salmond, 1 April 1918
- Air Vice Marshal Edward Ellington, 23 February 1922

RAF Middle East

- Air Vice Marshal Edward Ellington, 1 April 1922
- Air Vice Marshal Oliver Swann, 27 November 1923
- Air Vice Marshal Tom Webb-Bowen, 5 November 1926
- Air Vice Marshal Francis Scarlett, 12 October 1929
- Air Vice Marshal Cyril Newall, 26 September 1931
- Air Vice Marshal Cuthbert MacLean, 21 September 1934
- Air Vice Marshal Hazelton Nicholl, 10 March 1938

RAF Middle East (Air Officer's Commanding in Chief)

- Air Marshal - Air Chief Marshal Sir William Mitchell, 1 April 1939
- Air Chief Marshal Sir Arthur Longmore, 13 May 1940
- Air Marshal - Air Chief Marshal Sir Arthur Tedder, 1 June 1941
- Air Chief Marshal Sir Arthur Tedder, 29 December 1941

Middle East Command

- Air Chief Marshal Sir Sholto Douglas, 11 January 1943
- Air Marshal Sir Keith Park, 14 June 1944
- Air Marshal Sir Charles Medhurst, 8 February 1945

== See also ==
- List of Royal Air Force commands
