= Charles Burnett (RAF officer) =

Royal Air Force Air Chief Marshal (1882–1945)

Sir Charles Burnett
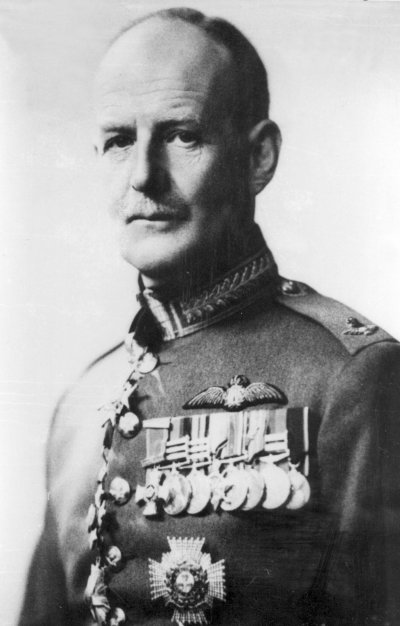
- Sir Charles Burnett in RAF full dress
- Born: Charles Stuart Burnett; 3 April 1882; Browns Valley, Minnesota, United States
- Died: 9 April 1945 (aged 63); RAF Halton, Buckinghamshire, England
- Military career
- Allegiance: United Kingdom
- Branch: British Army; Royal Air Force
- Service years: 1899–1909; 1914–1945
- Rank: Air Chief Marshal
- Commands: RAAF Chief of the Air Staff (1940–1942); Inspector-General of the RAF (1939–1940); Training Command (1936–1939); Inland Area (1935–1936); Iraq Command (1932–1934); Central Flying School (1927–1928); RAF Leuchars (1922); No. 29 Group (1921–1922); Mesopotamian Wing (1920); Fifth Wing, RFC (1917–1919); No. 12 Squadron RFC (1916–1917); No. 36 Squadron RFC (1916)
- Conflicts: Second Boer War; World War I; World War II
- Awards: Knight Commander of the Order of the Bath; Commander of the Order of the British Empire; Distinguished Service Order; Mentioned in Despatches (7); Commander of the Order of the Nile (Egypt); Knight of the Order of the Sword (Sweden)

Air Chief Marshal Sir Charles Stuart Burnett, KCB, CBE, DSO (3 April 1882 – 9 April 1945) was a senior commander in the Royal Air Force during the first half of the 20th century. He was Air Officer Commanding Iraq Command during the early 1930s. During the Second World War, he served as Chief of the Air Staff of the Royal Australian Air Force.

== Early life ==
Charles Burnett was born in Browns Valley, Minnesota, United States on 3 April 1882. He was the second son of John Alexander Burnett and Charlotte Susan Burnett. John Burnett was originally from the Scottish village of Kemnay in Aberdeenshire.

Burnett was educated at Bedford School in England. His younger brother was Robert Burnett who was later knighted and rose to the rank of admiral.

== Early career ==
In 1899, Burnett enlisted as a private in the Imperial Yeomanry to fight in the Second Boer War. Burnett claimed to be 18 when he was in fact only 17. He was discharged in 1901 that he might take a commission and he was gazetted as a second lieutenant in the Highland Light Infantry in October 1901. Burnett was then attached to the Imperial Yeomanry, where he temporarily held the rank of lieutenant in the 38th battalion from 26 April 1902 to 7 February 1903. He left South Africa for home on the SS Avondale Castle with other members of the battalion in late December 1902, and returned to his regiment in February 1903.

On 20 August 1904, Burnett was seconded to the West African Frontier Force. During the next five years Burnett saw action in Northern Nigeria, contracted blackwater fever, was promoted to lieutenant and was twice mentioned in despatches.

Burnett resigned his commission in September 1909 and then entered business as a part-owner of a shop in Portuguese Guinea. He did not meet with particular success as a businessman and by 1911 was employed by the British diplomatic service as the assistant resident in Ilorin, Nigeria.

== First World War ==
With the outbreak of hostilities in 1914, Burnett rejoined the British Army. After qualifying as a pilot in November 1914, he was commissioned as a lieutenant on 4 December 1914. Burnett married Sybil Pack-Beresford just six days before his first posting as a Royal Flying Corps wing adjutant, which brought a temporary promotion to captain. In May 1915, Burnett was posted as a flight commander on No. 17 Squadron where he flew BE2c from Fort Grange, Gosport and then Egypt. He became a substantive captain on 1 October 1916.

On 2 April 1916, Burnett was promoted to temporary major and appointed Officer Commanding of No. 36 Squadron, which was stationed in Cramlington. In October the same year Burnett was sent to the Western Front as Officer Commanding No. 12 Squadron. During his tour as Officer Commanding No. 12 Squadron, Burnett was once again mentioned in despatches.

With a promotion to temporary lieutenant colonel on 8 October 1917, Burnett was granted command of the Flying Corps' Fifth Wing which was operating in Palestine. Following his wing's contribution to the British victory in the Battle of Jerusalem in December 1917, Burnett was awarded the Distinguished Service Order. He was also awarded the Egyptian Order of the Nile, Third Class, and in the 1919 King's Birthday Honours he was made a Commander of the Order of the British Empire (CBE) in recognition of his wartime service in Egypt.

== Inter-war period ==
By the close of the war, Burnett had transferred to the newly formed Royal Air Force (RAF) and the next few years of his military career were to involve many changes of post. In 1919, Burnett was promoted to the temporary rank of brigadier general and appointed (again temporarily) as General Officer Commanding the RAF's Palestine Brigade. Later the same year, he accepted the offer of a permanent commission in the RAF with the rank of wing commander.

In April 1920, Burnett was given command of the RAF's Mesopotamian Wing and when the wing was upgraded to a group, he worked as a staff officer at the group's HQ. From February to October 1921, Burnett was a supernumerary, first at the HQ Middle East Area and then at No. 7 Group where he was sent pending his next posting. It was during this time that Burnett was promoted to group captain, although for some of the period he was on the half-pay list.

Burnett took up command of No. 29 Group in October 1921 but this was a short-lived appointment. In April 1922, Burnett was posted as station commander of RAF Leuchars which was a training base at that time. Once again Burnett did not spend long in post. By December 1922, he was a supernumerary once more, this time at the RAF Depot. From 1923-early 1927, Burnett served as the deputy director of Operations and Intelligence at the Air Ministry. He was made a Companion of the Bath (CB) in the 1927 New Year Honours. Burnett was then posted as the Commandant of the Central Flying School where he served until January 1929.

Having just been promoted to air commodore, Burnett's next tour saw him return to Iraq as the Senior Air Staff Officer at the HQ of Iraq Command where he served for the next two years. In early 1931, he returned to the United Kingdom and he was appointed to the double-hatted position of Deputy Chief of the Air Staff and Director of Operations and Intelligence. Burnett was promoted air vice-marshal the following July and he remained in post for a little under a year and a half.

In November 1932, Burnett returned to Iraq once more, this time as the Air Officer Commanding Iraq Command which placed him in charge of all British forces in Iraq. During his time in command Burnett was involved in the suppression of several tribal incursions near Kuwait and during one such occasion Burnett was wounded.

Burnett returned to Great Britain at the start of 1935 to take up command of the RAF's Inland Area. At the start of 1936, whilst Burnett was Air Officer Commanding Inland Area, he was promoted to air marshal and made a Knight Commander of the Order of the Bath (KCB) in the New Year Honours list. Later that year the RAF's command structure underwent a major reorganization. One of the changes was the redesignation of Inland Area as Training Command and Burnett became the command's first Air Officer Commanding-in-Chief. The next three years placed great demands upon Burnett and his command; as the threat from the German Luftwaffe increased, Training Command played a key role in the expansion of the RAF.

In July 1939, just prior to the outbreak of the Second World War, Burnett was appointed an additional Inspector-General of the RAF and in August he was a member of British military mission to the Soviet Union.

== Second World War ==
=== RAAF Chief of the Air Staff ===
Burnett continued in his role as Inspector-General of the RAF until 1940 when he was appointed Chief of the Air Staff of the Royal Australian Air Force. Burnett's appointment to the senior post in the RAAF was not without controversy. Apart from the fact that by 1940 Burnett was due for retirement and his health was not at its best, the choice of a British officer over an Australian one caused open resentment in many quarters of the RAAF. The Australian prime minister, Robert Menzies, had decided that a British officer should head the RAAF, believing that Australian officers lacked the necessary experience. After discussions between the British and Australian governments, Burnett was selected and given an acting promotion to air chief marshal, a rank he subsequently retained.

Air Chief Marshal Sir Charles Burnett arrives in Sydney, 13 February 1940

The vexed question of Australia's role in the Empire Air Training Scheme (EATS) had led to the resignation of Air Vice-Marshal Stanley Goble, the previous substantive RAAF Chief of the Air Staff. Unlike Goble and several other senior RAAF commanders, Burnett believed that his most important task was to implement EATS to the full and thereby increase Australia's ability to provide aircrew to the RAF. Under Burnett the RAAF expanded from a strength of 3,489 men just prior to the outbreak of war to 79,074 in May 1942. Of the approximately 80,000 personnel in the RAAF when Burnett was replaced, 42 per cent were EATS personnel.

Burnett also strove to increase the number of aircraft in the RAAF, although in this regard he was less successful than he was with increasing aircrew numbers. Under Burnett, RAAF units were placed in forward positions and priority was given to the aerial protection of Australian sea lanes. He also took a key role in the establishments of the Women's Auxiliary Australian Air Force (WAAAF) and RAAF health services, the latter having been provided by the Australian Army. He had an uneasy relationship with air minister John McEwen, with whom he frequently clashed over matters of expenditure. McEwen recalled in his memoirs that "Burnett wanted to spend amounts of money apparently without thought for where it was coming from while I was the one who had to accept responsibility for all expenditure".

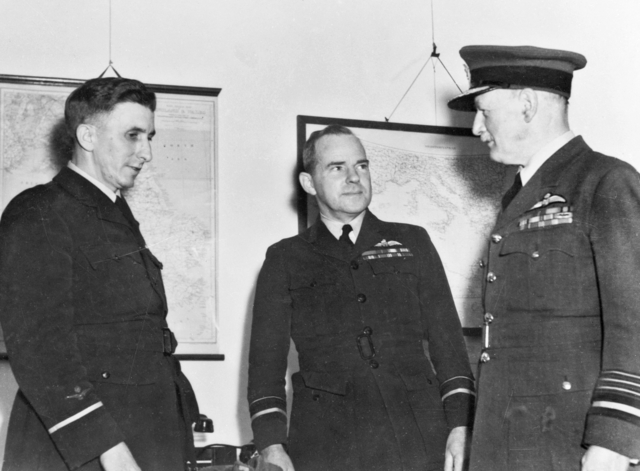
Burnett (right) with his replacement as RAAF CAS, AVM George Jones (left), and AVM William Bostock (centre), May 1942

Burnett also had a strained working relationship with Arthur Drakeford, who replaced McEwen as minister for air in October 1941 following the fall of the Fadden government. Burnett and Drakeford frequently clashed and when in early 1942 Burnett proposed sweeping organizational changes, including the abolition of the Australian Air Board, a breaking point was reached. It had also been widely argued that Burnett's focus on the European theatre resulted in the RAAF lacking sufficient defensive strength and by 1942 the threat of invasion by Japan was growing. Burnett was replaced in May 1942 by an Australian officer, Air Vice Marshal George Jones, who succeeded to the position despite Burnett's lobbying for his deputy, Air Vice Marshal William Bostock, to take over.

=== Return to United Kingdom and death ===
Burnett retired from the RAF shortly after his return to Britain, but in 1943 he worked full-time in the RAF's cadet organisation, the Air Training Corps, as the commandant of the ATC's Central Command. In this role, Burnett was responsible for ATC squadrons in Hertfordshire, Middlesex, Buckinghamshire, Oxfordshire, Berkshire and Bedfordshire. By 1945 Burnett remained as commandant but his health was declining and on 9 April 1945 he died of a coronary thrombosis at the Princess Mary Hospital at RAF Halton. Charles Burnett was survived by his wife and four daughters.

== Notes ==
Military offices
Preceded by Amyas Borton	Officer Commanding Fifth Wing, RFC; Later RAF; 1917–1919	Unknown
Preceded by S Grant-Dalton	Officer Commanding Arbitive Amalgamated HQ; January 1920 - March 1920	Succeeded by S Grant-Dalton; As Commanding Officer Palestine Group
Preceded by Wilfrid Freeman	Commandant of the Central Flying School; 1927–1928	Succeeded by Jack Baldwin
Preceded by Cyril Newall	Deputy Chief of the Air Staff and Director of Operations and Intelligence; 1931–1932	Succeeded by Edgar Ludlow-Hewitt
Preceded by Christopher Courtney	Air Officer Commanding Iraq Command; 1932–1934	Succeeded by William Mitchell (as Commander of British Forces in Iraq)
Preceded by H le M Brock	Air Officer Commanding Inland Area; 1935–1936	Renamed as Training Command
New title Command established	Commander-in-Chief Training Command; 1936–1939	Succeeded by Sir Arthur Longmore
Preceded by Sir Edward Ellington	Inspector-General of the RAF; 1939–1940	Succeeded by Sir Leslie Gossage
Preceded by William Anderson	Chief of the Air Staff (RAAF); 1940–1942	Succeeded by Sir George Jones
Other offices
Preceded by T W C Carthew	Commandant of the Air Training Corps' Central Command; 1943–1945	Unknown
