= Arthur Longmore =

British Royal Air Force officer (1885-1970)

Air Chief Marshal Sir Arthur Longmore GCB DSO DL
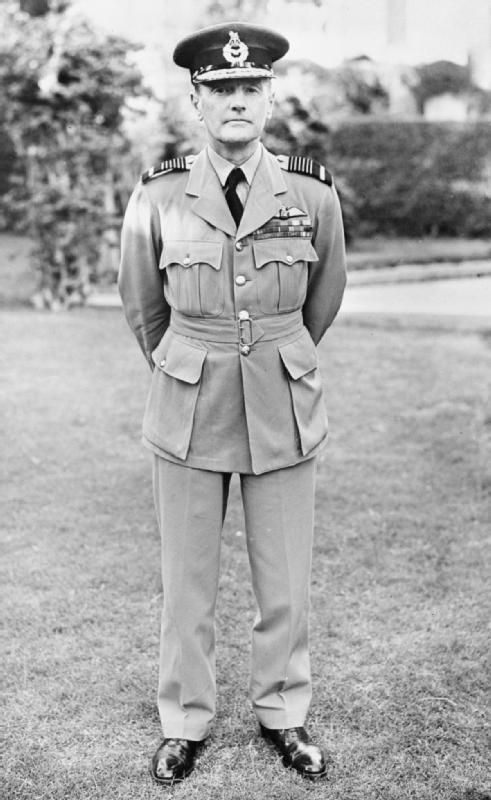
- Longmore in the gardens of Air Headquarters, Middle East Command, in Cairo, c. 1940–41
- Born: 8 October 1885; Manly, Australia
- Died: 10 December 1970 (aged 85); Surrey, England
- Military career
- Allegiance: United Kingdom
- Branch: Royal Navy (1900–18); Royal Air Force (1918–44)
- Service years: 1900–42; 1943–44
- Rank: Air Chief Marshal
- Commands: Inspector-General of the RAF (1941–42); Middle East Command (1940–41); Training Command (1939–40); Imperial Defence College (1936–39); Coastal Command (1936); Coastal Area (1934–36); RAF College Cranwell (1929–33); No. 7 Group (1924–25); No. 3 Group (1920–21); No. 1 Squadron RNAS (1914–15); No. 3 Squadron RNAS (1914)
- Conflicts: First World War; Second World War
- Awards: Knight Grand Cross of the Order of the Bath; Distinguished Service Order; Mentioned in Despatches; Officer of the Order of the Crown (Belgium); Knight of the Legion of Honour (France); Croix de guerre (France); Officer of the Order of Saints Maurice and Lazarus (Italy); War Cross for Military Valor (Italy); Grand Cross with Swords of the Royal Order of George I (Greece); War Cross (Greece)
- Other work: Vice-Chairman of the Commonwealth War Graves Commission

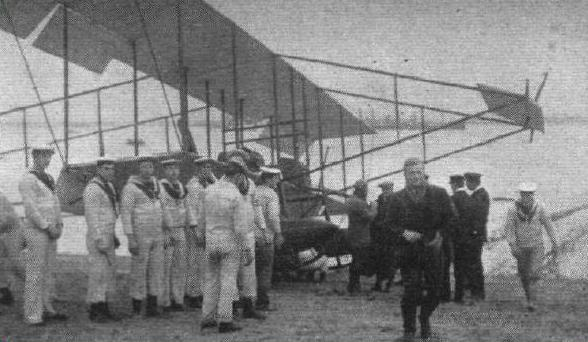
Then-Lieutenant Longmore (in dark coat walking toward camera on right) on 1 December 1911 immediately after he became the first person in the United Kingdom to take off from land and make a successful water landing, using the aircraft behind him, a Short Improved S.27 bearing Admiralty number 38, later often called the "Short S.38."

Air Chief Marshal Sir Arthur Murray Longmore, GCB, DSO, DL (8 October 1885 – 10 December 1970) was an early naval aviator, before reaching high rank in the Royal Air Force. He was Commander-in-Chief of the RAF's Middle East Command from 1940 to 1941.

== Early life ==
Born in Manly, New South Wales, the son of English parents Charles Croker Longmore and Janet Murray, he was educated at Benges School, Hertford, and Foster's Academy, Stubbington, before entering Dartmouth Naval College. He was commissioned into the Royal Navy in 1904. Having developed an interest in flying, he volunteered for pilot training when the Navy accepted an offer of training facilities by the Royal Aero Club, and was one of the four officers to be selected. He obtained flying certificate No.72 in April 1911 at an RAeC meeting that also awarded licences to the pioneer naval aviators C. R. Samson and Wilfred Parke. That year, assisted by Oswald Short of Short Brothers, he devised a way of mounting streamlined air bags on the undercarriage struts and under the tail of a Short Improved S.27 biplane with the construction number S.38—later often referred to as the "Short S.38"—and on 1 December 1911, using the air bags for flotation, then-Lieutenant Longmore became the first person in the United Kingdom to take off from land and make a successful water landing in a seaplane when he landed Improved S.27 No. 38 on the River Medway off Sheerness.

== Career ==
Longmore joined the Royal Naval Air Service in 1912. Before the outbreak of the First World War he served as a flight instructor at the newly formed Central Flying School, Upavon, and was then appointed commander of the seaplane base at Cromarty and later of the experimental seaplane establishment at Calshot. During the war he served as Officer Commanding No. 3 Squadron RNAS and then as Officer Commanding No. 1 Squadron RNAS before being transferred back to sea duties as an officer on the battlecruiser HMS Tiger in 1916; during his service aboard Tiger he took part in the Battle of Jutland. He obtained a permanent commission in the Royal Air Force in 1920 and was appointed Air Officer Commanding No. 3 Group later that year before being given command of the RAF Depot in 1921. He was made Air Officer Commanding No. 7 Group in 1924, Director of Equipment at the Air Ministry in 1925 and Chief Staff Officer at Headquarters Inland Area in 1929. Subsequent appointments included Commandant of the Royal Air Force College Cranwell in December 1929, Air Officer Commanding Inland Area in 1933 and Air Officer Commanding Coastal Area (which was renamed RAF Coastal Command under his leadership) in 1934. He went on to be Commandant of the Imperial Defence College in 1936.

The outbreak of the Second World War found Longmore an air chief marshal and in charge of RAF Training Command. On 2 April 1940, he was appointed Air Officer Commanding in the Middle East. He did not long enjoy the full confidence of Winston Churchill in that position and was relieved of his command in May 1941. His last role before his formal retirement in 1942 was as Inspector-General of the RAF.

The Oxford Dictionary of National Biography says the following of Longmore during the first few months of 1941:

Longmore's constant demands for reinforcements resulted in some unwelcome attention from Churchill, who hated pessimists and senior commanders who complained about their lack of resources. After some acerbic correspondence, in which Churchill accused Longmore of failing to make proper use of the manpower and aircraft he had, Longmore was recalled to London in May 1941. He was succeeded in the Middle East by Air Chief Marshal Sir Arthur Tedder.

In retirement he was vice-chairman of the Commonwealth War Graves Commission. Longmore's memoirs, From Sea to Sky 1910–1945, were published in 1946.

== Grantham by-election, 1942 ==
Longmore was the Conservative candidate at the Grantham by-election in 1942 caused by the ennoblement of the sitting Conservative MP, Rt Hon. Sir Victor Warrender, as Baron Bruntisfield.

Polling day was set for 25 March 1942. When nominations closed, it was to reveal a two-horse race, between the Conservative Longmore and the Independent Denis Kendall. Longmore received a joint letter of endorsement from all the leaders of the parties in the coalition.

Kendall had initially been supported by the Grantham Labour Party, which then withdrew support on orders from Labour Party headquarters. The party kept its collective head down during the campaign, though they did have to restrain Montague Moore, the previous Labour candidate and a few other local Labour members from actively supporting Kendall.

The war was not going well for the Allies; the Russians had been driven back, the Japanese had taken Singapore and many were calling for Britain to create a 'Second Front' in Europe. The popular Labour politician Sir Stafford Cripps, who had returned to Britain following a spell as Ambassador to Russia, was brought into Churchill's War Cabinet.

One of Kendall's campaign leaflets proclaimed that "Denis Kendall is another Stafford Cripps. Independent yet Churchillian."

Kendall revealed wartime production figures in his election hustings speeches to criticise the government, but in a way that breached the Official Secrets and the Defence of the Realm Acts.

The Grantham Communist party in line with the position taken by their national headquarters, circulated a leaflet that urged electors to vote for the Conservative Longmore, so as to show solidarity with the Red Army.

=== Result ===
Kendall won and became the first Independent to defeat a government candidate since the war started.

Grantham by-election, 1942 Electorate 54,317
| Party | Candidate | Votes | % | ±% |
|---|---|---|---|---|
| Independent | William Denis Kendall | 11,758 | 50.8 | n/a |
| Conservative | Air Chief Marshal Sir Arthur Murray Longmore | 11,391 | 49.2 | −8.9 |
| Majority | | 367 | 1.6 | |
| Turnout | | 23,149 | 42.6 | |
| Independent gain from Conservative | | Swing | | |

== Family ==
In 1913 Longmore married Marjorie Maitland, the daughter of William James Maitland C.I.E.; they had a daughter and three sons. One of their sons, Wing Commander Richard Maitland Longmore OBE, was killed in action on 4 October 1943, in the course of an attack on a U-boat. Richard's daughter Elisabeth married Nicholas Luard in 1963 and became a food writer. Another son, Captain Peter Maitland Longmore, M.C., was in Egypt and India with Field Marshal Archibald Percival Wavell, 1st Earl Wavell. Peter Longmore married Field Marshal Wavell’s daughter Lady Felicity Ann Wavell in Delhi on 20 February 1947.

Military offices
| Preceded by Edward Masterman | Air Officer Commanding No. 7 Group; 1924–1925 | Succeeded by Duncan Pitcher |
| Preceded by Frederick Halahan | RAF College Commandant; 1929–1933 | Succeeded by William Mitchell |
| Preceded by Napier Gill; Temporary appointment preceded by Robert Clark-Hall | Commander-in-Chief Coastal Area; 1934–1936 | Replaced by RAF Coastal Command |
| New command | Commander-in-Chief Coastal Command; 1936 | Succeeded by Philip Joubert de la Ferté |
| Preceded by Sir Robert Haining | Commandant of the Imperial Defence College; 1936–1939 | Succeeded by Sir Hugh Binney |
| Preceded by Sir Charles Burnett | Commander-in-Chief Training Command; 1939–1940 | Vacant Command split into: Flying Training Command; Technical Training Command Title next held by Sir John Davis |
| Preceded by Sir William Mitchell | Commander-in-Chief Middle East Command; 1940–1941 | Succeeded by Sir Arthur Tedder |
| Preceded by Sir William Mitchell | Inspector-General of the RAF; 1941–1942 | Vacant Title next held by Sir Arthur Tedder |
