= Peregrine Fellowes =

- Fellowes on 18 February 1933
- Born: Peregrine Forbes Morant Fellowes; 23 December 1883
- Died: 12 June 1955 (aged 71)
- Citizenship: British
- Occupations: pilot, military officer

Air commodore Peregrine Forbes Morant Fellowes (23 December 1883 – 12 June 1955) was a senior officer in the Royal Naval Air Service during World War I and senior commander in the Royal Air Force during the 1920s and early 1930s.
