= No. 5 Wing RAF =

No. 5 Wing RAF ~~Fifth Wing~~
- Active: 15 April 1915–1 April 1920; 1 April 1923–April 1924; 26 October 1935–14 August 1939; 13 December 1939–6 July 1940; 1 April 1953–September 1966
- Country: United Kingdom
- Branch: Royal Air Force; Royal Flying Corps
- Role: Corps Wing; Home Defence Wing; Signals Wing
- Engagements: Sinai and Palestine Campaign; Battle of France

Commanders
- Notable commanders: Lt-Col Lionel Charlton; Lt-Col Geoffrey Salmond; Lt-Col Philip Joubert de la Ferté; Lt-Col Amyas Borton; Lt-Col Charles Burnett; Wing CdrJohn Tyssen; Gp Capt Raymond Collishaw

No. 5 Wing of the Royal Air Force was a wing of aircraft squadrons which was originally established as the Fifth Wing of the Royal Flying Corps. Currently inactive, the wing has been formed and disbanded five times over the course of its history.

== First World War ==
The Fifth (Corps) Wing of the Royal Flying Corps was one of the earliest wings to be established. On 15 April 1915 No. 8 Squadron and No. 13 Squadron of the RFC were grouped together at Fort Grange, Gosport to form the 5th Wing. Major L.E.O. Charlton, No. 8 Squadron commander, temporarily took command of the Wing until he travelled to France.

=== Middle East ===
In November 1915 the 5th Wing, under the command of Lieutenant Colonel W. G. H. Salmond, arrived in the Middle East. At this time it consisted of No. 14 Squadron, No. 17 Squadron and an aircraft park. Between June 1916 and October 1917, No. 1 Squadron, Australian Flying Corps – which was known as 67 Squadron in British military circles (to avoid confusion with similarly named RFC and RNAS units) – was also part of the wing.

In February 1916, 5th Wing HQ was at Ismailia, with auxiliary aerodromes for Nos 14 and 17 Squadrons (flying mostly BE2c aircraft) at Heliopolis, El Qantara and Suez. X Aircraft Park for repair and supply was at Abbasia. Unusually, the Qantara flight of No. 14 Sqn was made self-sufficient by being given 80 camels to transport petrol, and a number of sand carts for hauling tents and aircraft spares.

At the opening of the Second Battle of Gaza (19 April 1917), 5th Wing was disposed as follows:

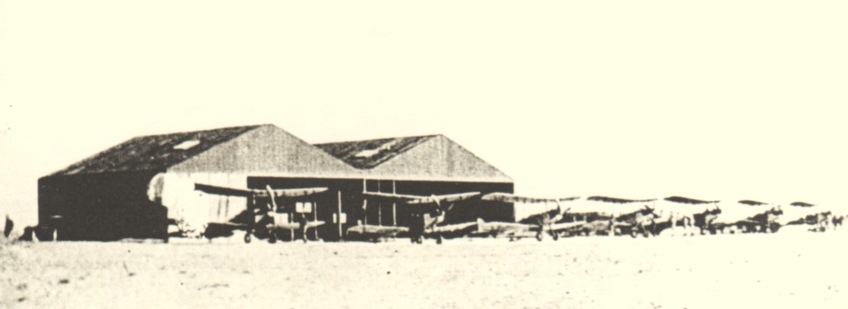
BE2cs at Ismailia aerodrome.

- Wing HQ at Rafah
- Advanced HQ at Deir al-Balah
- No 14 Sqn, HQ and A Flight at Rafah
  - B Flight at Deir el Balah
- No 67 Sqn, AFC, at Rafah
- X Aircraft Park at Abbasia
- Advanced Aircraft Park at El Qantara

The wing had 25 aircraft at its disposal: 17 BE2s and 8 Martinsydes. A further 5 aircraft were detached to Arabia. Although the Martinsydes were the best fighting machines available, they were prone to overheating in the hot climate, and were inferior to the two German Halberstadts that had caused several casualties during the First Battle of Gaza.

In October 1917, before the Third Battle of Gaza, 5th Wing consisted of Nos 14 (16 BE2e) and 113 Sqn (8 BE2e, 5 RE8) and was now under the command of Palestine Brigade, RFC. In September 1918, at the time of the victory of Megiddo, it comprised:

- Wing HQ at Er-Ramleh
- No 14 Sqn at Junction Station – 16 RE8s, 3 Nieuport Scouts
- No 113 Sqn at Sarona – 16 RE8s, 5 Nieuports
- No 142 Sqn at Sarona – 7 Armstrong-Whitworth F.K.8s
  - Detached flight at Jerusalem – 5 RE8s

When hostilities ended the Fifth Wing was headquartered at RAF Ramleh in Palestine. The 5th Wing was disbanded on 1 April 1920.

=== Commanders ===
- 15 April 1915 L E O Charlton
- November 1915 Lieutenant-Colonel W G H Salmond
- 1 July 1916 Lieutenant-Colonel P B Joubert de la Ferté
- 5 February 1917 Lieutenant-Colonel A E Borton
- 8 October 1917 Lieutenant-Colonel C S Burnett

== 1923 to 1924 ==
No. 5 Wing was reformed on 1 April 1923 and its function was to control all RAF fighter squadrons north of the River Thames. On 30 April, Wing Commander John Tyssen was appointed as the Officer Commanding. However, this period of the Wing's existence was short-lived and it was disbanded in April 1924.

=== Commanders ===
- 30 April 1923 Wing Commander J H S Tyssen

== 1935 to 1936 ==
Following the tensions surrounding the Abyssinia Crisis, the Wing was reformed on 26 October 1935. The Officer Commanding was Group Captain Raymond Collishaw. It controlled No. 3 Squadron RAF, No. 35 Squadron RAF, No. 47 Squadron RAF and No. 207 Squadron RAF during the Second Italo-Abyssinian War. The Wing was disbanded on 14 August 1936.

== Second World War ==
During the first year of the Second World War (13 December 1939 to 6 July 1940, after the Dunkirk evacuation) No. 5 Wing was responsible for controlling radar units based in France.

== 1953 to 1966 ==
No. 5 Wing was a Signals Wing within the RAF Second Tactical Air Force based in West Germany, its last base was RAF Butzweilerhof.

== See also ==
- List of Wings of the Royal Air Force

== External sources ==
- Air of Authority – A History of RAF Organisation
- RAF Museum
- No 8 Squadron
- No 113 Squadron
