= Wings over Kabul: The First Airlift =

Book about a 1920s evacuation

- First edition cover, William Kimber, 1975
- Author: Anne Baker; Air Chief Marshall Sir Ronald Ivelaw-Chapman
- Language: English
- Subject: Kabul airlift of 1928–1929
- Genre: History
- Publisher: William Kimber & Co. Limited
- Publication date: 1975
- Publication place: UK
- Pages: 191
- ISBN: 0-7183-0184-6

Wings over Kabul: The First Airlift, is a book by Anne Baker and Air Chief Marshall Sir Ronald Ivelaw-Chapman, detailing the Kabul airlift of 1928–1929. It was published in 1975 by William Kimber & Co. Limited with a foreword provided by William Dickson. Baker's father, Sir Geoffrey Salmond, was head of the Royal Air force in India at the time of the airlift, and directed the rescue.

Told mainly through official documents, letters and memoirs, including some from Sir Francis Humphrys, British minister in Kabul based at the British legation in 1928, the book pieces together the stories of the 84 air missions that successfully airlifted 586 civilians and officials from Kabul between 23 December 1928 and 25 February 1929, in what has been described by David Jordan, reader in defence studies at King's College, as the first significant use of airpower in an insurgency campaign.

Sir William Hildred noted it to be a well documented record of one of the Royal Air Force's historical landmarks, and James Stourton described it as a book to be celebrated. Airfix Magazine agreed that the book documented the rescue, but claimed it significantly underestimated the risks and dangers of the evacuation.

== Publication and background ==
Wings over Kabul: The First Airlift was written by Anne Baker and Air Chief Marshall Sir Ronald Ivelaw-Chapman, who in 1928 was a flight lieutenant. It was published by William Kimber & Co. Limited in 1975. Baker's father, Sir Geoffrey Salmond, was head of the Royal Air Force in India at the time of the evacuation. Sir Francis Humphrys was the British minister in Kabul based at the British legation, situated just outside Kabul.

Baker subsequently wrote a biography of her father titled From Biplane To Spitfire: The Life of Air Chief Marshal Sir Geoffrey Salmond (2004).

== Layout ==
The book begins with acknowledgements of sources including letters from Humphrys' and his wife's diaries, letters to and from Salmond and Lord Trenchard, memoirs of Flight Lieutenant G. Donaldson, documents from the HM Stationery Office, British Aircraft Corporation, Royal Air Force Museum London, Hendon, India Office and the Public Records Office, and information about later airlifts by No. 46 Group RAF. A foreword acknowledging Salmond's role in developing air routes to India is provided by William Dickson, who in 1929-30 was Salmond's staff officer and pilot.

The preface is written by Ivelaw-Chapman who points out that although a smaller scale evacuation had been carried out seven years earlier in Sulaymaniyah, the Kabul airlift of 1928-29 was the first major air evacuation of civilians and officials from one country to another at a time of political tension. In the preface and postscript, he contrasts the Afghanistan airlift with the Berlin airlift of 1948, and makes close parallels with the Dacca airlift of 1971 and the Cyprus airlift of 1974. One common lesson he draws from all three airlifts is that; "it [UK] must keep in being not only adequate air transport capacity for its own needs but, and here lies the rub, see to it that there is sufficient flexibility in their [aircraft] use for them to be diverted from the normal task to wherever in the world these 'mercy missions' call for their presence".

The book is in 20 chapters interspersed with photographs, and after the postscript the book ends with an appendix depicting a record of the number of British and foreign personnel evacuated; 268 men, 153 women and 165 children. There are a few footnotes, but no bibliography or index.

== Synopsis ==
The book records the 84 air missions that contributed to the successful evacuation of 586 civilians and officers from Kabul beginning in 1928, directed by Salmond who had been Air Officer Commanding RAF in India since 1927. The first chapter gives the background to the near decade development of the Air Force in India up to 1928, including the first civilian flight from England to India in early 1927. The next few chapters outline the make-up of the North West Frontier, and the infuriations for the Mullahs caused by the King of Afghanistan, Amanullah's series of political changes intended to bring about a more European way of life in 1928. By early-December, political tension in Afghanistan caused Humphrys to have concern, and fearing a massacre, he sent Salmond a message requesting the evacuation of all civilians from the Legation. According to the authors, it was possibly the memory of the 1842 retreat from Kabul during winter with temperatures reaching as low as -17 °C that prompted Humphrys to request that the evacuation take place by air.

Baker states that, Salmond in 1928, had in his command only one transport plane, the Hinaidi, but it was in Baghdad, and his 24 Airco DH.9As and two Westland Wapitis were not confirmed for use. In addition, she explains that Kabul is 6,000 feet above sea level, and that aircraft would be required to fly over and in-between hazardous mountains that peaked 10,000 feet. Recounted are the experiences of the many reconnaissance flights, including the first reconnaissance flight, of No. 27 Squadron. Humphrys left on the final flight from Kabul and arrived in Peshawar on 25 February 1929.

== Reviews and responses ==
In History.net, the book is suggested for further reading on the Kabul airlift. It was noted by reader in defence studies at King's College, David Jordan, to describe the first significant use of airpower in an insurgency campaign. This view was reiterated by James Stourton who describes it as a "celebrated book" of the first evacuation of its kind. Sir William Hildred in The Aeronautical Journal called it a "fascinating" account of one of the Airforce's historical landmarks with its "suicidal flights" now well documented in Baker's book. Hildred notes the useful inclusion of the first flight to India and describes the book as a good record of the flights, with plenty of photographs. He notes that the book shows Salmond's command of the rescue and Humphrys' protection of the Legation as equal feats of leadership.

Airfix Magazine appreciated the factual information in the book which "sets the record straight", but felt that the risks of using only one large passenger aircraft and flying in an open cockpit in freezing temperatures through some of the world's most dangerous mountain range were not reflected in the book, which "grossly understates the heroism and dangers of the whole affair".

Wings over Kabul provides a reference for Ivelaw-Chapman's flights to and from Kabul. Following the return of No. 70 Squadron RAF to Kabul after the Taliban insurgency, extracts from the book appeared in The Telegraph in 2009. It is cited frequently throughout British army officer, Andrew Roe's historical paper on the evacuation published in Air Power Review in 2012. The book is listed in K. S. McLachlan's A Bibliography of Afghanistan.

== Gallery ==
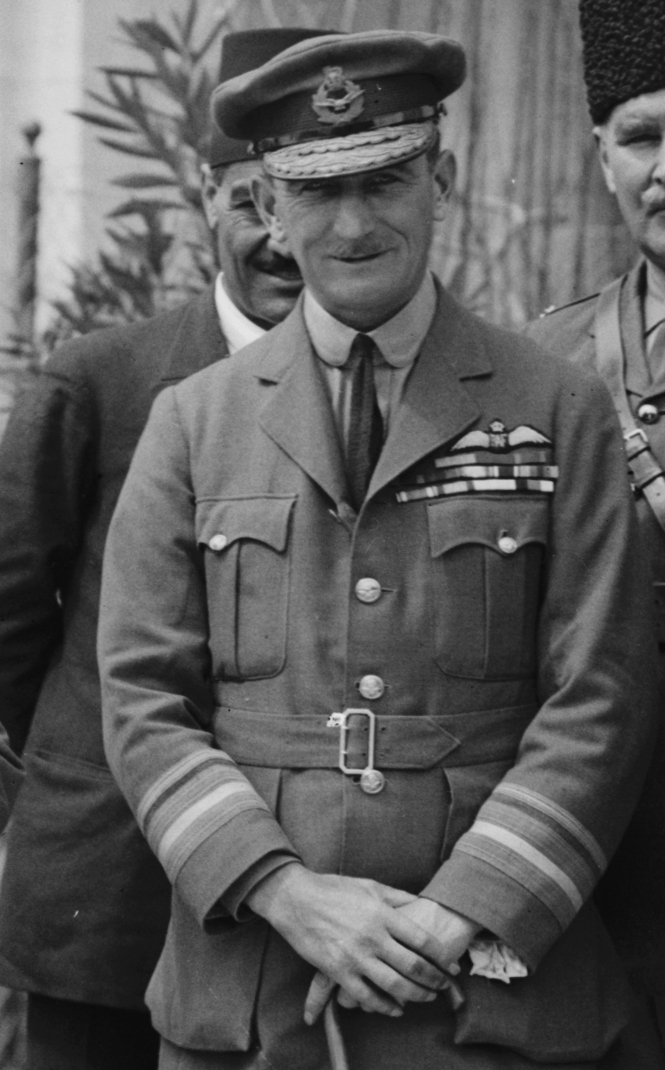
Sir Geoffrey Salmond

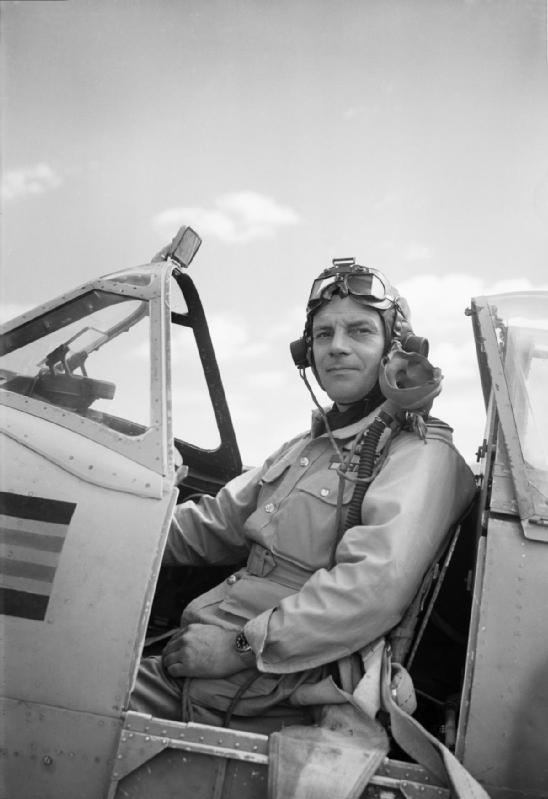
Air Vice Marshall Dickson sitting in the cockpit of his Spitfire

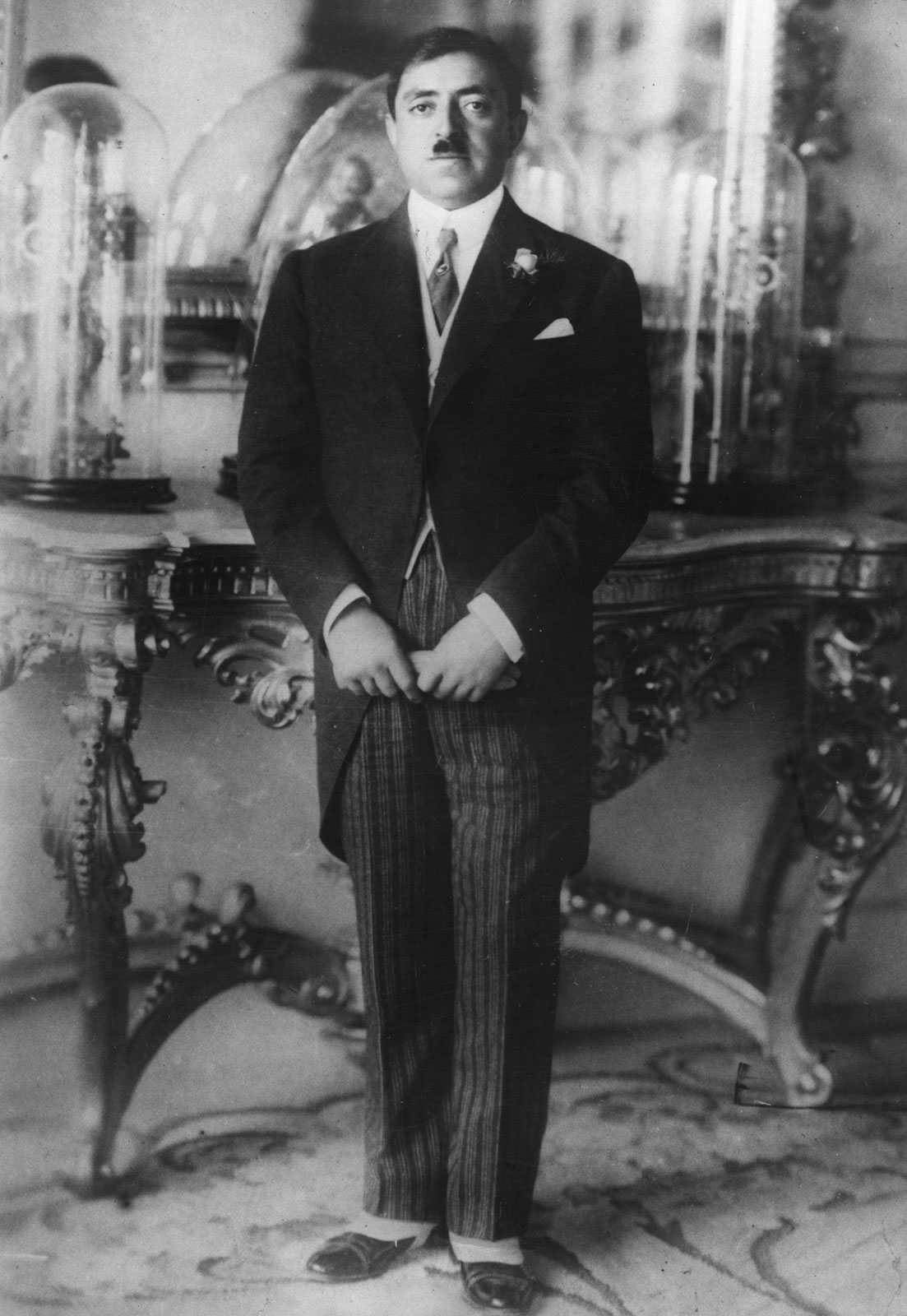
King Amanullah of Afghanistan

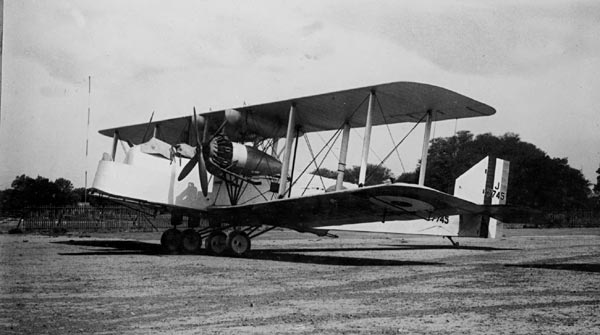
Hinaidi aircraft

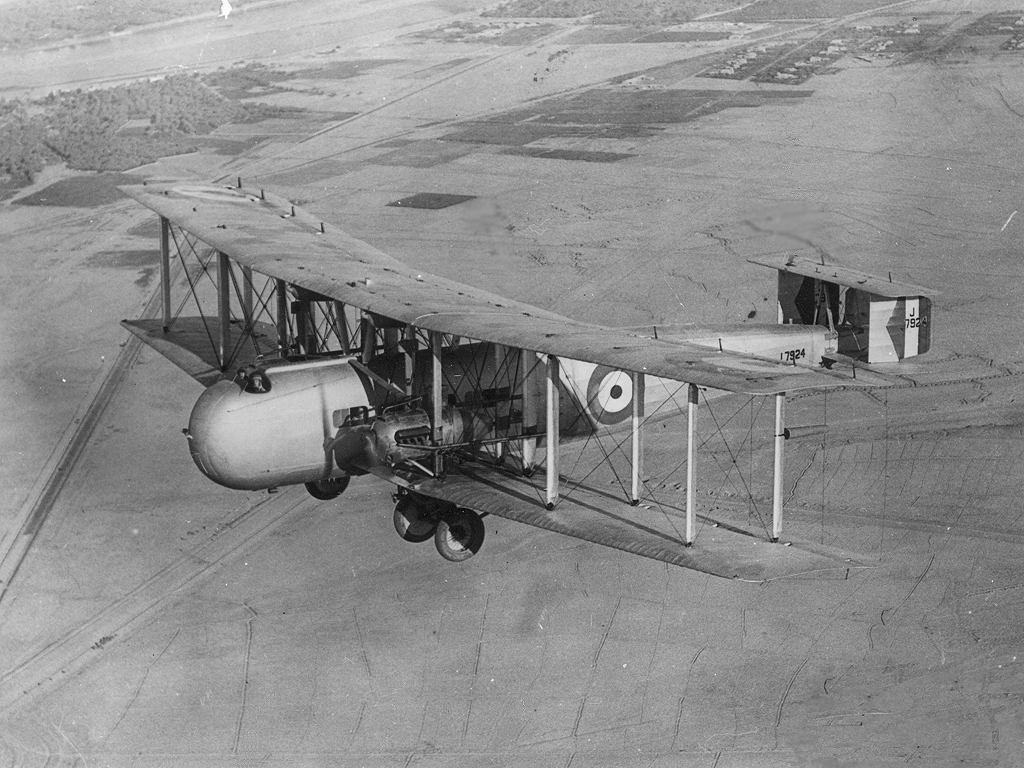
RAF Vickers Victoria J7924, photographed over Iraq
