= Popham panel =

Ground-to-air signaling device

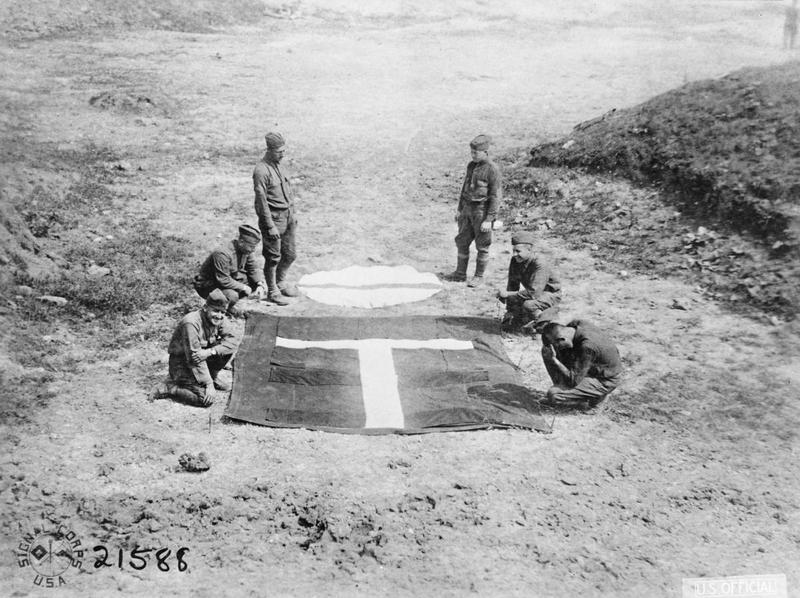
A Popham panel in use by the U.S. Army at Beauval, France, in 1918.

A Popham panel, or T-signalling panel, was a means of ground-to-air communication, in Morse code, developed during the First World War, before the introduction of radio communication. It was named for Robert Brooke-Popham and was used by the British and American armed forces.

Popham panels were used in the Waziristan campaign of 1919–1920, and in the Kabul Airlift of 1928, and remained in use as a reserve method of communicating with aircraft as late as just before the Second World War. They were eventually rendered obsolete by the development of effective radio communication with aircraft.

== Origin ==
The Popham panel, first introduced in 1918, was named for First World War Royal Air Force officer, Robert Brooke-Popham, and designed to communicate messages to aircraft from the ground, in Morse code, before the introduction of radio communication.

== Operation ==
British writer Anne Baker, described a Popham panel as the size of a "small Persian rug" and structured as a blind. The top of the slats were painted green and from the air, it appeared green when closed. Strong elastic held the slats closed and the operator could pull a cord against the tension of the elastic, to open the blind, showing a white background. The person on the ground could open the panel for a short time, indicating a "dot" in Morse code, or a longer time, indicating a "dash", and thereby had a method of producing a message. If the aircraft located the panel, the air crew could be able to read a message sent by the ground operator. It was aided with a numerical code system, with white numbers in broad strips. One example of a pre-arranged code was "XII", meaning ""come again tomorrow". Andrew Roe described a type that were made from dark blue waterproof American cloth. It weighed around 12 pounds (5.4 kg) and was about 8 by 10 feet (2.4 m × 3.0 m) in size, with a white T-shape stitched on. Branching off were further white panels with dark blue flaps, which were numbered one to nine.

== Deployment ==
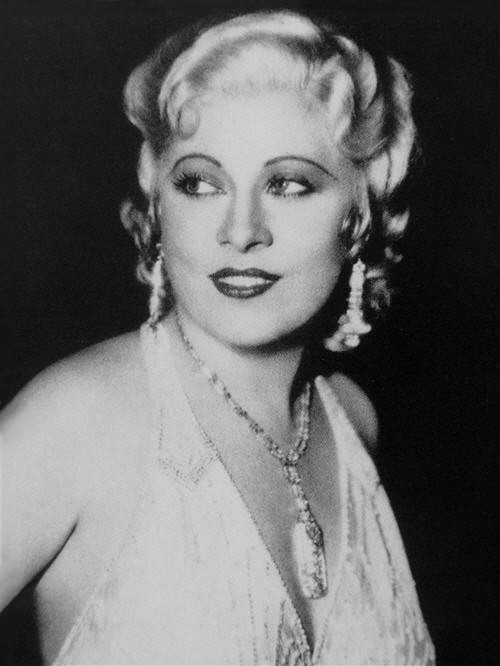
The actress Mae West was requisitioned by a British commander serving on the North-West Frontier of India using a Popham panel.

The panels were used by the British and in the United States, where they were given to battalions, brigades and regiments for communicating with aircraft.

They were used during the Waziristan campaign of 1919–20 on the North-West Frontier of India along with the simpler ground-based signals, but military historian Herman Watteville described them as "of no great value" in that fast-moving conflict. The slow transmission rate was also a problem when aircraft had limited fuel and had to circle for a prolonged period of time to read the more complicated messages, running the risk of having to make an emergency landing in hostile territory. According to Colonel Hugh Pettigrew, who served with the South Waziristan Scouts during the Waziristan campaign (1936–1939), they were aided frequently by the RAF at Miranshah. Often unable to land and sometimes with the wireless not functioning, they had to revert to using old-fashioned land-signals in the form of Popham panels. In his book he gave an account of how one bored base commander laboriously signalled to a pilot as a joke that he wanted the actress Mae West rather than the more usual supplies, and got into a great deal of trouble for doing so. According to Pettigrew the pilot was believed to be Subroto Mukerjee, who later became Chief of the Indian Airforce.

During the Kabul Airlift (1928–1929), on 18 December 1928, Flying Officer Trusk flew a DH.9A, with L. A. C. Donaldson, to Kabul to drop a Popham panel on the grounds of the British Legation in Afghanistan. They had less than 15 minutes to drop the panel, which was to be delivered in two halves; the second half to be dropped if the first was successful and was not captured by the enemy. The complete panel was eventually delivered to the legation by the Afghan Army, after the aircraft had to land nearby due to damage. Subsequently, further Popham panels were sent and were used to deliver messages such as "we are confined to the Legation".

They were still in use as a reserve method of communication prior to the Second World War despite their drawbacks when compared to radio communication.
