= Anne Baker (biographer) =

British writer and fundraiser (1914–2025)

Anne Baker MBE
- Born: Anne Isobel Salmond; 14 May 1914; London, England
- Died: 23 September 2025 (aged 111 years, 132 days); Salisbury, Wiltshire, England
- Education: Wirral Grammar School for Girls
- Alma mater: Lady Margaret Hall, Oxford
- Occupations: Writer, fundraiser
- Spouse: Valentine Baker (before 1979)
- Children: 5
- Father: Geoffrey Salmond

Anne Baker MBE (née Salmond; 14 May 1914 – 23 September 2025) was a British writer of historical biographies, fundraiser and supercentenarian.

== Biography ==
Baker was born Anne Isobel Salmond just before the outbreak of World War I, the daughter of Sir Geoffrey Salmond (1878–1933) who later became the professional head of the Royal Air Force. She was educated at Lady Margaret Hall, Oxford, and lived with her father and mother in both Egypt and India. She married Valentine Baker (1910–1979) and had five children. She lived in Salisbury and turned 100 in May 2014. Baker received a merit award from the National Society for the Prevention of Cruelty to Children (NSPCC) at the charity's Salisbury fundraising branch on 28 April 2017 for more than 50 years of volunteer work. In July 2019, she was reportedly still fundraising at the age of 105.

She was awarded an MBE in the 2021 New Year Honours for services to the NSPCC. In May 2024, she turned 110. She was deemed the oldest person in Wiltshire.

Baker died in Salisbury on 23 September 2025, at the age of 111 years and 132 days.

== Works ==
- Morning Star (1972), The life of Florence Baker, wife of the explorer Sir Samuel Baker
- Wings over Kabul: The First Airlift (1975), Account of the Kabul Airlift, co-written with Sir Ronald Ivelaw-Chapman
- A Question of Honour (1996), The Fall and Rise of Colonel Valentine Baker
- From Biplane to Spitfire: The Life of Air Chief Marshal Sir Geoffrey Salmond (2003)
