= Reginald Mills (RAF officer) =

British military officer

Reginald Percy Mills
- Born: 7 December 1885; Spalding, Lincolnshire, England
- Died: 4 July 1968 (aged 82); Hobart, Australia
- Military career
- Allegiance: United Kingdom
- Branch: British Army (1905–18); Royal Air Force (1918–42)
- Service years: 1905–1936; 1939–1942
- Rank: Air Vice Marshal
- Commands: Central Area (1933–34); 51st Wing RFC (1917–19); 14th Wing RFC (1916–17); No. 6 Squadron RFC (1915–16)
- Conflicts: First World War; Second World War
- Awards: Companion of the Order of the Bath; Military Cross; Air Force Cross; Mentioned in Despatches (2); Knight of Order of Saints Maurice and Lazarus (Italy); Officer of the Legion of Honour (France); Croix de guerre (France)

Air Vice Marshal Reginald Percy Mills, CB, MC, AFC (7 December 1885 – 4 July 1968), was a senior commander in the Royal Flying Corps and later the Royal Air Force during the First World War and the early years of the Second World War.

== Early life ==
Reginald Mills was born in Spalding, Lincolnshire, the son of William Henry Mills, an architect and Emily Wiles Quincey Mills (née Hobson). His siblings included William Hobson Mills, an organic chemist and winner of the Davy Medal. He was educated at Felsted School.

Between 1905 and 1912 he held reserve commissions in The Lincolnshire Regiment and the Royal Fusiliers, becoming a regular officer in the latter in 1912.

== Royal Flying Corps service ==
Mills was awarded Royal Aero Club Aviator's Certificate no. 377 on 17 December 1912, and was appointed a flying officer in the RFC on 14 August 1913, joining No. 4 Squadron. He was among the first RFC pilots to cross the English Channel at the beginning of the First World War and saw action at the Battle of Mons. On 22 January 1915 he is believed to have scored an air-to-air kill with a rifle fired from the cockpit of his plane. On 10 April 1915 he became a flight commander in No. 7 Squadron and was appointed commanding officer of No. 6 Squadron on 9 December 1915. He commanded 6 Squadron until September 1916, during which time it participated in the Battle of the Somme.

On 21 September 1916 Mills assumed command of 14th Wing in Italy, before transferring to the command of 51st Wing in October 1917, a position he held until the end of the war.

== Royal Air Force service ==
Mills was awarded a permanent commission in the Royal Air Force as a lieutenant colonel in August 1919 (shortly afterwards redesignated as wing commander). He held a variety of staff positions throughout the 1920s, including chief staff officer in the RAF in India. In late 1928 and early 1929, he superintended the rescue of British embassy staff and others in the Kabul evacuation by air operation.

He retired an air vice marshal in 1942.

== Family and later life ==
Mills married Helen Bulpett at Yatesbury Church on 29 April 1919. The marriage was later dissolved. He retired to Hobart, Tasmania, where he died in 1968.
