= Kabul airlift =

Kabul airlift may refer to:

- Kabul airlift of 1928–1929, during the Afghan Civil War
- 2021 Kabul airlift, during the Taliban offensive
