= H. R. C. Pettigrew =

British Army officer and memoirist

- Born: Hugh Rudolph Conway Pettigrew; 1912
- Died: 18 April 2001 (aged 88–89); Merton, Surrey, England
- Spouse: Patricia Maynard (m. 1938)
- Children: 2 sons
- Military career
- Branch: British Indian Army
- Rank: Colonel
- Other work: Frontier Scouts (1964); "It Seemed Very Ordinary": Memoirs of Sixteen Years in the Indian Army 1932–1947 (IWM)

Colonel Hugh Rudolph Conway Pettigrew (1912 – 18 April 2001) was an officer in the British Indian Army whose memoir of his service with the South Waziristan Scouts on India's North-West Frontier, Frontier Scouts (1964), is a primary source for the study of the military history of that region, as his memoir "It Seemed Very Ordinary": Memoirs of Sixteen Years in the Indian Army 1932–1947 is for the history of the British Indian Army generally.

After early service policing the Indian border, he served in Burma during the Second World War where he gained experience of jungle warfare during the loss of the colony to the Japanese. He then passed on his experience at the staff college in preparation for the successful Allied campaign to recover Burma. After retiring from the army, he taught, became the principal of a school, and coached school hockey. He produced his two memoirs and in 1994 recorded an oral history for the Imperial War Museum.

== Early life and family ==
Hugh Pettigrew was born in 1912. He married Patricia Maynard in Worthing, Sussex, in 1938. They had two sons.

== Army career ==
Pettigrew was commissioned second lieutenant in the British Indian Army in 1932. He was attached to the Gordon Highlanders in 1932–33 after which he was company second in command with the 2nd/14th Punjab Regiment in the Khyber Pass, and at Mir Ali and Kohat on India's North-West Frontier from 1933 to 1937. He left Kohat in April 1937 to join the South Waziristan Scouts. He was posted to the first wing at Sararogha. He served in Waziristan until 1938 where he was involved in actions against the Mahsud tribesmen. In his memoirs he observed that troops arriving from Britain had to quickly adapt to conditions on the frontier, and that if a regiment thought it was "too famous to have to learn, to think that the Highlands of Scotland bore any real resemblance to the mountains of Waziristan, that regiment might have trouble. And during its year in Waziristan it would be of little use to anyone, and often a liability."

He was an instructor at the officer training school in Belgaum from 1938 to 1940, and then became brigade major of 63 Indian Infantry Brigade (17th Indian Division) at Kohima and Imphal, from February 1942 to July 1943. Following that, he was an instructor with the rank of lieutenant colonel at Quetta until December 1944. He was one of the few there with experience of jungle warfare (based on the retreat from Burma) and had to teach the special techniques of that type of fighting as the focus turned from Western Desert style warfare and the mountain warfare of his early career to the fighting needed to recover Burma.

He was then appointed a staff officer with the 17th Division in Burma in 1945. He was a staff officer in the Directorate of Weapons and Equipment at Delhi until November 1947.

== Later life ==
After leaving the army, Pettigrew worked as a teacher and was principal of Highcliff Coaching Establishment in Selsey, West Sussex, near Chichester, which prepared boys for the Common Entrance Examination used by British private schools.

In 1964, he privately published his memoir of his service with the South Waziristan Scouts on India's North-West Frontier, titled Frontier Scouts which was reviewed in The Army Quarterly and Defence Journal and The Royal Air Forces Quarterly. His memoir "It Seemed Very Ordinary": Memoirs of Sixteen Years in the Indian Army 1932–1947 is held as part of his private papers in the Imperial War Museum, London. Both have become much-cited primary sources for the study of the military history of that region. The Museum also holds his oral history, recorded in 1994. Passages from "It Seemed Very Ordinary", covering the advance into Burma, were used as the prologue for part four of Robert Lyman's A War of Empires: Japan, India, Burma & Britain: 1941–45 (2021).

Pettigrew died in Merton, Surrey, on 18 April 2001.

== Works ==
- Frontier Scouts. Hugh Pettigrew, Kelsey Press Limited, Selsey, Sussex, 1964.
- "It Seemed Very Ordinary": Memoirs of Sixteen Years in the Indian Army 1932–1947. Pettigrew MSS, 84/29/1, Imperial War Museum.
