= No. 27 Squadron RAF =

Flying squadron of the Royal Air Force

- Squadron badge of No. 27 Squadron
- Active: 1915–1918 (RFC); 1918–1920; 1920–1942; 1942–1946; 1947–1950; 1953–1957; 1961–1972; 1973–1982; 1983–1993; 1993–present
- Country: United Kingdom
- Branch: Royal Air Force
- Type: Flying squadron
- Role: Helicopter heavy-lift support, Special Operations Air Task Unit (SOATU)
- Part of: Joint Aviation Command
- Station: RAF Odiham
- Mottos: Quam celerrime ad astra (Latin for 'With all speed to the Stars')
- Aircraft: Boeing Chinook HC5 and HC6A

No. 27 Squadron is a squadron of the Royal Air Force. It operates the Boeing Chinook from RAF Odiham in Hampshire. In July 2026, 27 Squadron took on the role of NATO's Special Operations Air Task Unit (SOATU), providing specialist aviation support to the NATO Allied Reaction Force's Special Operations Component.

== History ==
=== First World War (1915–1919) ===
No. 27 Squadron of the Royal Flying Corps (RFC) formed at Hounslow Heath Aerodrome in London on 5 November 1915, being split off from No. 24 Squadron. Initially using aircraft borrowed from No. 24 Squadron, No. 27 Squadron moved to Swingate Down outside Dover in late November 1915. In early February 1916, it received its initial operating equipment, the Martinsyde G.100 Elephant fighter aircraft. It transferred to France on 1 March 1916, serving as part of 9th Wing RFC. Initially the squadron was tasked with using its aircraft as escort fighters, but by the time the Battle of the Somme began, it was clear that the Elephant was unsuitable as a fighter. At the Somme, the squadron was initially tasked with mounting standing fighter patrols to protect British bombers and reconnaissance aircraft and with bomber-reconnaissance duties, taking advantage of the Martinsyde's good range and load carrying capacity, carrying out its first bombing mission on 1 July 1916. It was ordered to concentrate on bombing duties on 9 July.

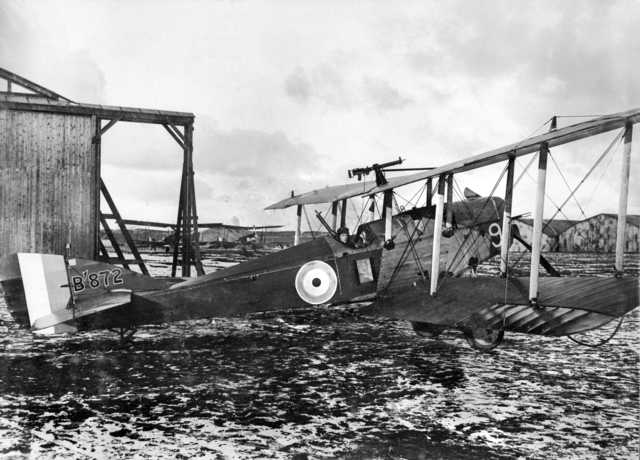
A Martinsyde G.100 Elephant in 1917, of the type operated by No. 27 Squadron

The squadron continued to operate the Elephant into 1917, taking part in the Battle of Arras in April to May, the Battle of Messines in June, where the squadron attacked German airfields, and from July that year the Battle of Passchendaele (also known as the Third Battle of Ypres), where the squadron attacked railway targets and airfields. It re-equipped with the Airco DH.4, which carried twice the bomb-load of the Elephant at greater speed and height, while carrying a gunner to defend against enemy fighters, from between September and December 1917, but was still equipped with the Elephant and the DH.4 when it flew in support of the British offensive at Cambrai.

In March 1918, the squadron moved to Villers-Bretonneux east of Amiens as part of a concentration of the RFC's resources against the likely route of a suspected German offensive. The morning of 21 March brought the start of Operation Michael, the opening part of the German spring offensive. At first the squadron was deployed against railway junctions, to slow the movement of German reinforcements. On 24 March, the squadron was forced to evacuate from Villers-Bretonneux, threatened by the German advance, to Beauvois-en-Cambrésis. On 25 March, as the Germans threatened to breakthrough near Bapaume, all available squadrons, including No. 27 Squadron, were ordered to carry out low level attacks against the German troops. The squadron continued to fly a mixture of low level attack against troop concentrations and high level attacks over the next few days, and on 29 March was forced to move airfields again, this time to Ruisseauville.

On 1 April 1918, the RFC merged with the Royal Naval Air Service to form the Royal Air Force, but this had little effect on the squadrons at the front, with No. 27 Squadron continuing to operate against the German offensive. On 9 April, the Germans launched the second stage of its offensive, an attack near the River Lys at the junction between the British First and Second Armies. The squadron was again deployed against the offensive attacking railway targets from 12 April. It started to receive Airco DH.9 bombers in July 1918, but as these proved to be inferior to the DH.4, managed to keep some of its DH.4s until the end of the war. The squadron was disbanded on 22 January 1920.

=== Inter-war period (1920–1938) ===
On 1 April 1920, No. 27 Squadron was reformed by re-numbering No. 99 Squadron which at the time was in India, flying Airco DH.9A light bombers from Risalpur over the North-West Frontier. Operations included Pink's War, an aerial bombardment campaign against militant Mahsud tribesmen in South Waziristan in March and April 1925, the first colonial policing action carried out solely by the RAF, without the participation of the British Army.

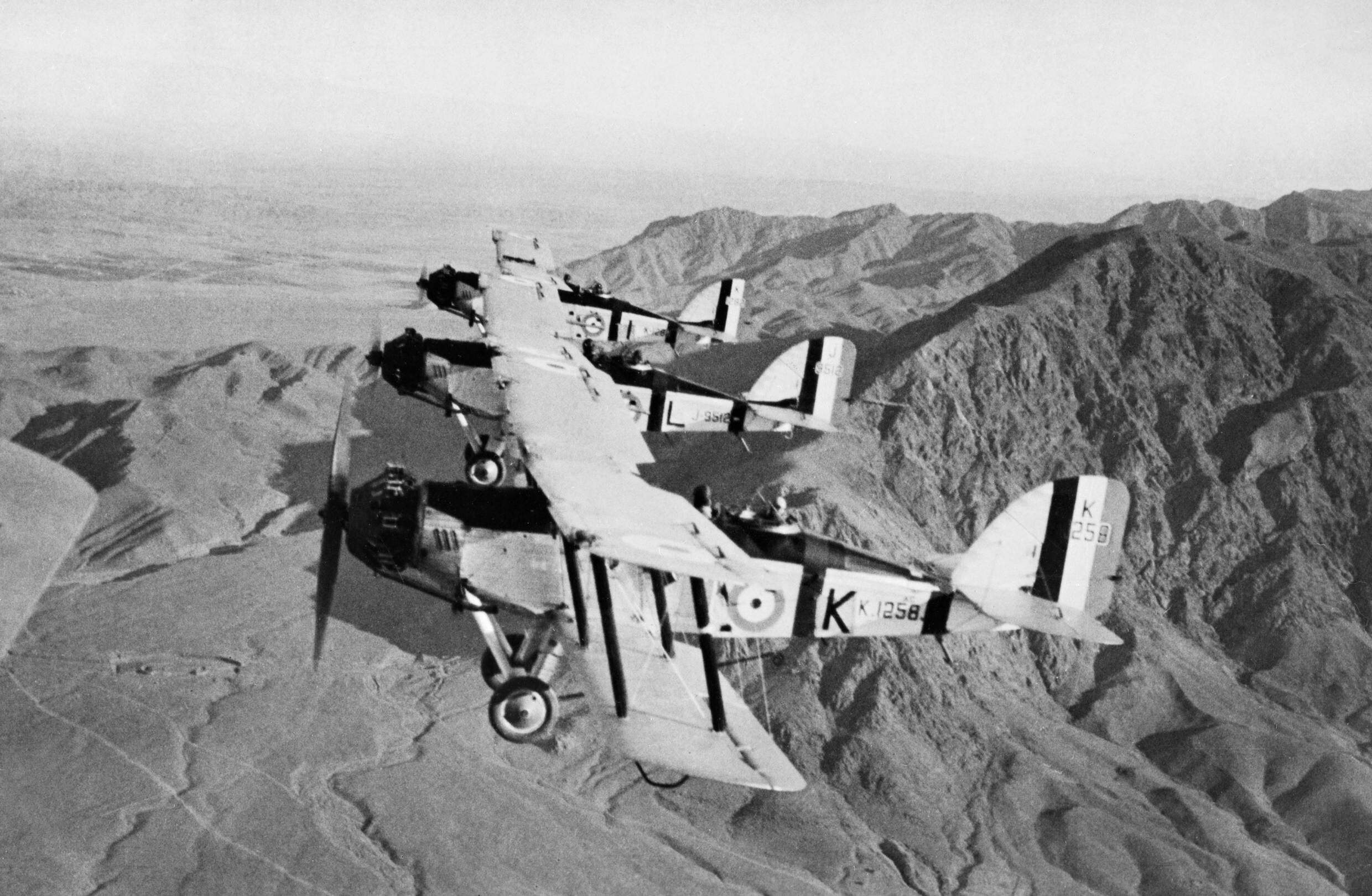
Westland Wapitis of the type operated by No. 27 Squadron, over India c. 1931

The DH.9A was eventually replaced by the Westland Wapiti in 1928, when the squadron moved to Kohat. In December 1928, Flying Officer Tusk and Leading aircraftman Donaldson (both of No. 27 Squadron), flew the first mission of the Kabul Airlift. Strictly a reconnaissance flight to ascertain the situation of the British Legation in Kabul during a civil war, they were shot at by local tribesmen and forced to land at a nearby airstrip. After this they managed to dash across no-man's land and arrived at the legation to set up communications with their home base of Risalpur.

=== Second World War (1939–1945) ===
The outbreak of the Second World War in Europe in September 1939 saw part of No. 27 Squadron deployed on coastal anti-submarine and anti-shipping patrols from Madras. On 1 October 1939, the squadron became a flying training school at Risalpur, training pilots for the Indian Air Force and operating de Havilland Tiger Moth and Hawker Hart biplanes as well as Wapitis.

Many of the squadron's former operational pilots were employed ferrying Bristol Blenheim medium-bombers from Egypt to India and the Far East. In January 1941, Blenheims started to be delivered to the squadron, allowing a Blenheim-equipped No. 27 Squadron to be split off from the training school in February and sent to Singapore. The squadron's Blenheims were Mk.IF variants, fitted with an under-fuselage gun-pack for use as a long-range and night fighter, and were the only RAF night fighters in the Far East.

The squadron moved to Butterworth in May 1941 and to Sungai Petani in August that year. Japan invaded Malaya on 8 December 1941, and that morning No. 27 Squadron launched eight Blenheims to attack Japanese invasion shipping. Poor weather prevented any Japanese ships from being located. Air attacks on the airfield at Sungai Petani damaged the airfield and left the squadron with only four airworthy aircraft. It was evacuated to Butterworth that evening. The remaining aircraft were pulled back to Singapore by 12 December, where they, together with a few Blenheims from other squadrons operated under the name of No. 27 Squadron. The remaining Blenheims based at Singapore, including those of No. 27 Squadron were evacuated to Sumatra from 23 January 1942, ending up operating from Palembang. On 14 February, four Blenheims attacked Japanese ships invading Sumatra, with the loss of two aircraft, with those that remained airworthy aircraft evacuating to Java on 15 February. Here the squadron effectively ceased to exist.

A new No. 27 Squadron was formed at RAF Amarda Road in India on 19 September 1942, although it initially had no aircraft, not receiving its first Bristol Beaufighter until 22 October and not having a full complement of Beaufighters until 21 December. It flew its first operation, an attack on Taungoo airfield in Burma, on 24 December 1942. The squadron moved to Kanchrapara in January 1943, and to Agartala in February, joining No. 169 Wing of No. 224 Group. The squadron used its Beaufighters for ground-attack missions over Burma and anti-shipping strikes.

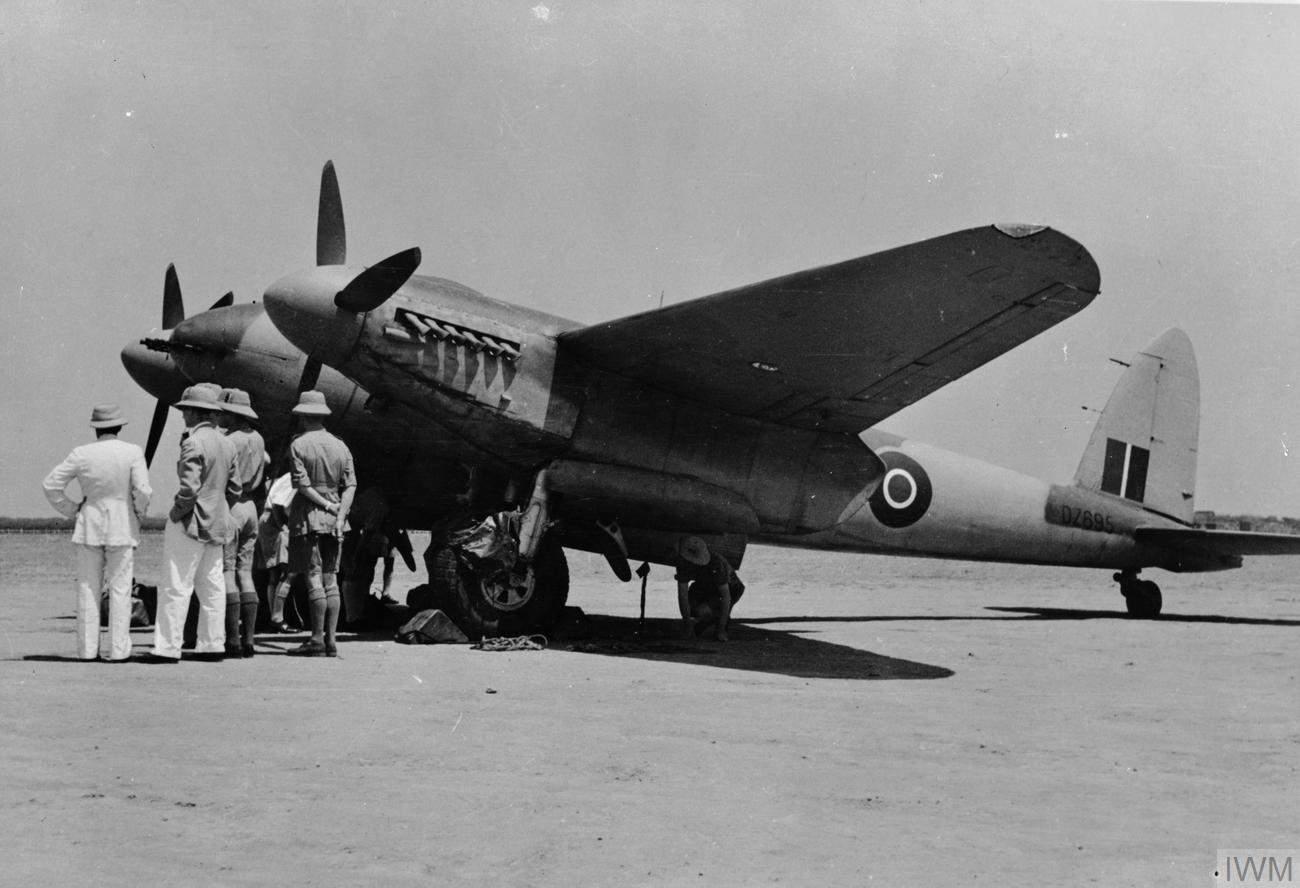
A de Havilland Mosquito Mk.II of No. 27 Squadron in India during the Second World War

In April 1943, the squadron received a number of de Havilland Mosquitoes for evaluation, and a flight was re-equipped with Mosquitoes in December that year. The glue-and-plywood construction of the Mosquito proved to be less than optimal for tropical Burma, and the operations were plagued by technical problems. They eventually relinquished the Mosquitoes to No. 680 Squadron, retaining the Beaufighter and continuing the squadron's ground attack and anti-shipping strikes, switching to air-jungle rescue in April 1945.

Following the Japanese surrender, it was deployed to Batavia during the Indonesian War of Independence, being disbanded on 1 February 1946.

=== Cold War (1946–1990s) ===
On 24 November 1947, No. 27 Squadron reformed at RAF Oakington, Cambridge in the transport role and equipped with the Douglas Dakota. It flew both scheduled transport routes and trained in glider towing, taking part in the Berlin Airlift in 1948 and 1949. It was disbanded on 10 November 1950.

On 15 June 1953, the squadron reformed at RAF Scampton, Lincolnshire as part of RAF Bomber Command, equipped with the English Electric Canberra bomber. It took part in the Suez Crisis in 1956, and was disbanded at RAF Waddington in Lincolnshire on 31 December 1957.

In April 1961, the squadron reformed again at RAF Scampton, as the first squadron to be equipped with the Avro Vulcan B.2 and forming part of the United Kingdom's strategic nuclear strike force, known officially as the V force. The squadron's Vulcans were equipped with the Blue Steel one megaton stand-off bomb until 1969 when their eight aircraft were each re-equipped with a WE.177B laydown bomb with a 450 kiloton yield. The squadron was assigned to NATO's Supreme Allied Commander Europe (SACEUR) in a low-level penetration role which would provide tactical support for ground forces resisting a Soviet land attack into Western Europe, by striking targets assigned by SACEUR, beyond the forward edge of the battlefield, and deep into enemy-held areas.

By the end of 1971, the squadron had relinquished its nuclear delivery role, and stood down until in December 1973 when it reformed at RAF Scampton, again with the Vulcan B.2 but in the maritime radar reconnaissance (MRR) role assigned to Supreme Allied Commander Atlantic.

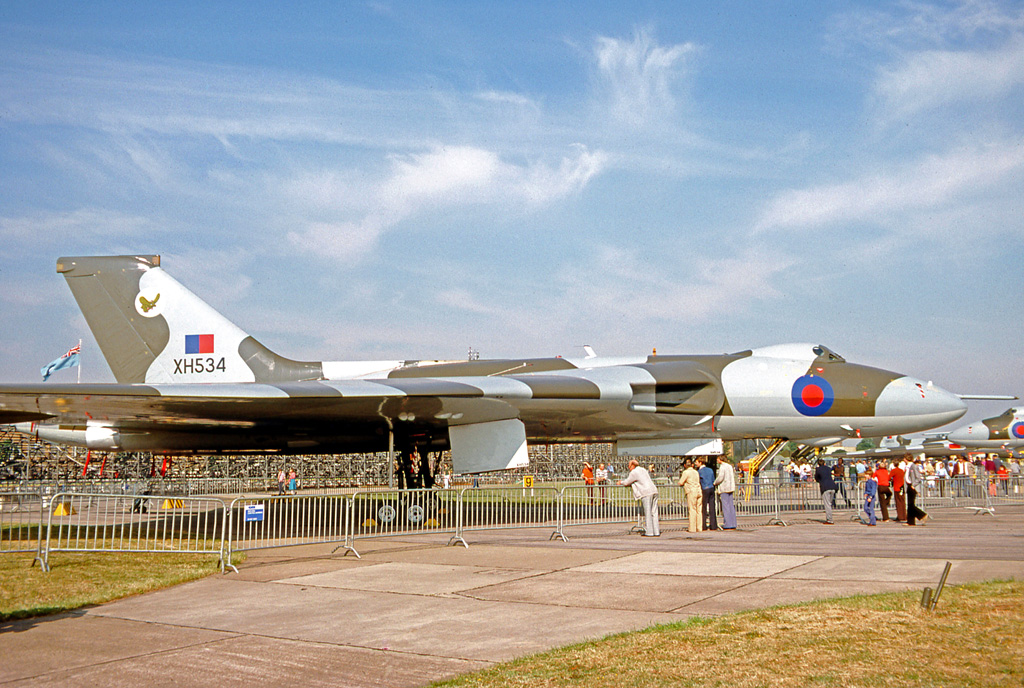
An Avro Vulcan B.2 (MRR) of No. 27 Squadron wearing the unit's elephant symbol on its fin in 1977

From 1973 to 1982 the squadron performed the duties of 'strategic reconnaissance' with onboard equipment to monitor the fall-out from air and ground-based nuclear tests being performed by emerging nuclear powers in the Indian sub-continent and Southeast Asia. The squadron's Vulcans were modified (and re-designated as "Vulcan B.2 (MRR)") to carry underwing 'sniffer' and collection equipment to detect and collect samples of airborne contamination for later analysis at the Atomic Weapons Research Establishment at Aldermaston, Berkshire. The samples were collected by flying through the high altitude dust cloud of a ground-based test or the downwind contamination of the upper atmosphere after an air burst. The squadron disbanded again at Scampton in 1982.

The squadron reformed again at RAF Marham, Norfolk in 1983 with twelve Panavia Tornado GR1 aircraft and eighteen WE.177 nuclear bombs, and once again assigned to SACEUR in 1984 in the same low-level penetration tactical support role.

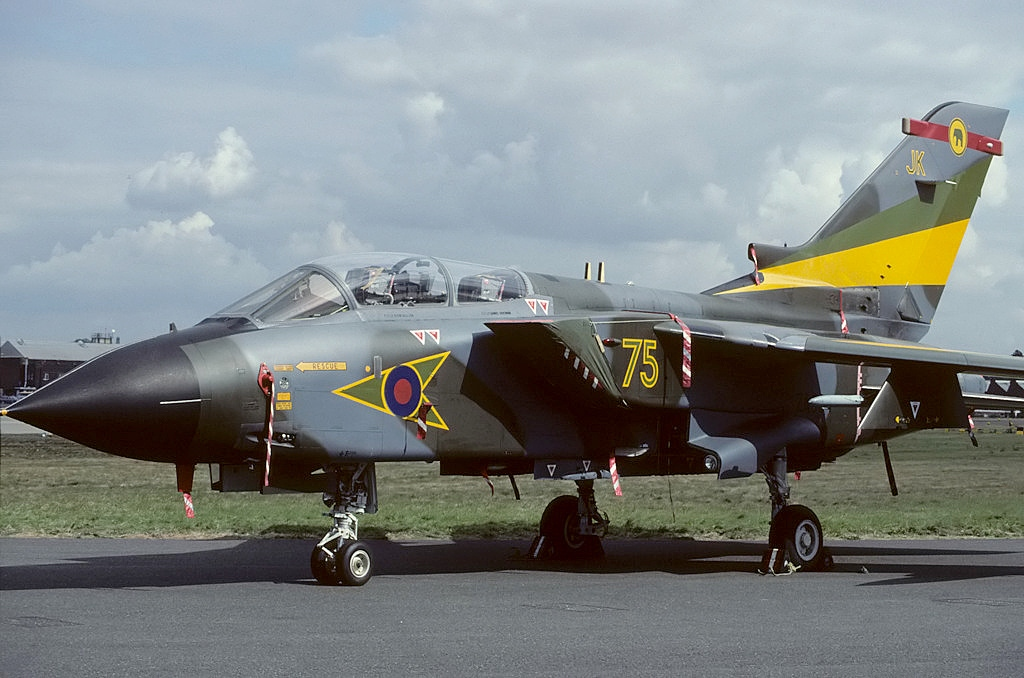
A Panavia Tornado GR1 wearing No. 27 Squadron 75th anniversary markings in 1990

The squadron's allocation of eighteen WE.177 weapons was because of the greater carrying capacity of the Tornado, which could carry two weapons. The apparent mismatch between twelve Tornado aircraft and eighteen nuclear weapons was because RAF staff planners expected up to one third attrition of aircraft in the conventional phase, with sufficient aircraft held back in reserve to deliver the squadron's full stock of nuclear weapons if the conflict escalated to the use of tactical nuclear weapons. In September 1993, the squadron's Tornado aircraft and personnel moved to RAF Lossiemouth, Moray and took on the number plate of No. 12 Squadron which had recently disbanded at RAF Marham.

The No. 27 Squadron number plate was transferred to No. 240 Operational Conversion Unit (OCU) at RAF Odiham in Hampshire and it became No. 27 (Reserve) Squadron, the Boeing Chinook and Westland Puma training squadron.

=== 21st century (2000–present) ===
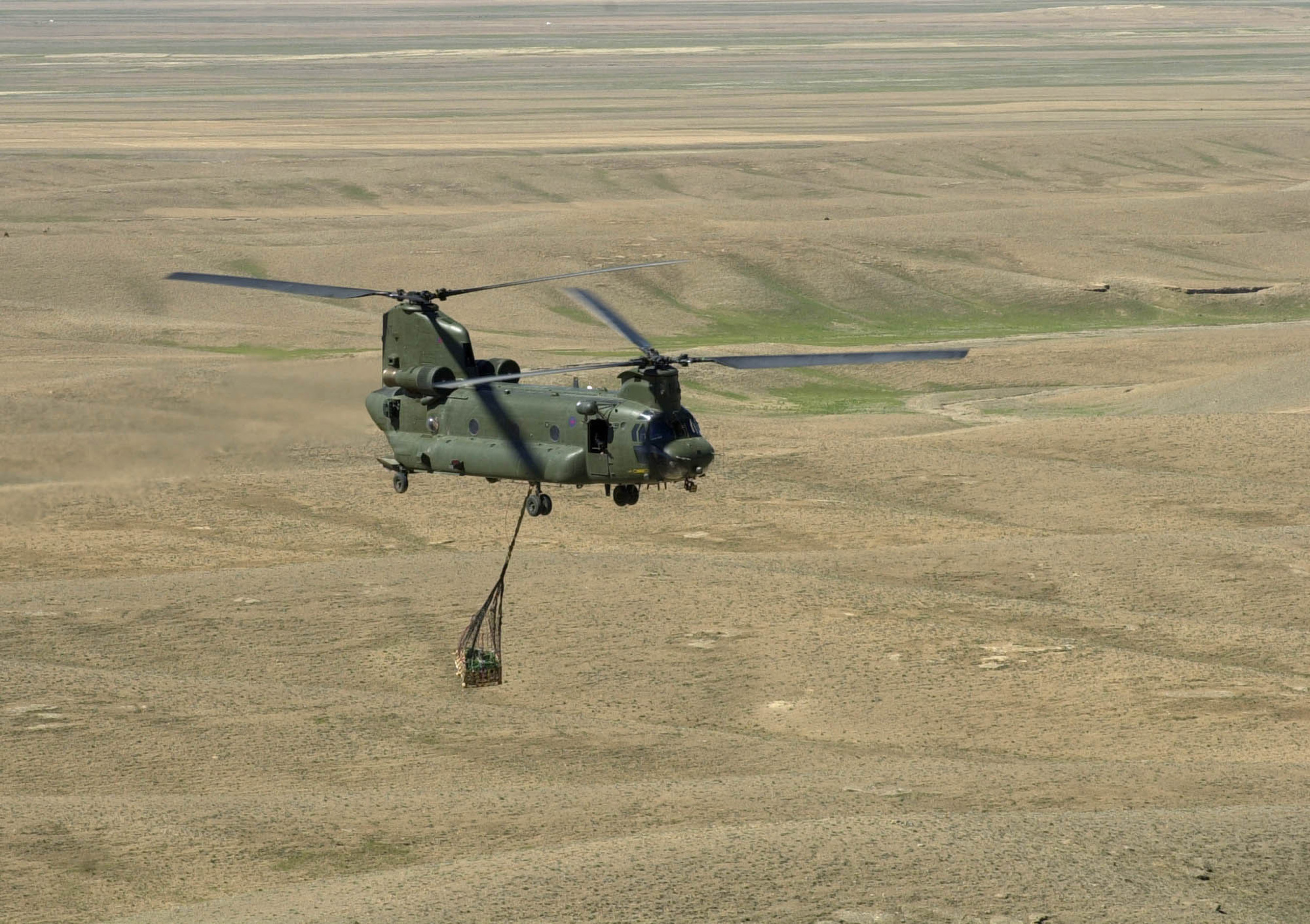
A No. 27 Squadron Boeing Chinook operating over the mountains of Afghanistan in 2002

In 2002, No. 27 Squadron's Chinooks saw service in Afghanistan as they transported Royal Marines from 3 Commando Brigade for Operation Jacana.

The squadron also served in a transport role during the 2003 invasion of Iraq and was stationed at Basra as part of No. 1310 Flight, supporting British operations in Iraq, known as Operation Telic. In July 2006, three Chinooks of No. 27 Squadron deployed to RAF Akrotiri in Cyprus to evacuate British citizens from Lebanon.

In 2007, the squadron featured in a BBC One television documentary Above Enemy Lines. It documented a two-month deployment to Helmand, Afghanistan during Operation Herrick. The squadron returned to Afghanistan in 2011.

In March 2020, the squadron was awarded the right to emblazon a battle honour on its squadron standard, recognising its role in the War in Afghanistan between 2001 and 2014.

On 1 July 2026, 27 Squadron became NATO's Special Operations Air Task Unit (SOATU), providing specialist aviation support to the NATO Allied Reaction Force's Special Operations Component.

== Heritage ==
The squadron's heraldic badge features an elephant. First used in 1934, it was approved by King Edward VIII in October 1936. The use of the elephant refers to the Martinsyde G.100, which was known as the 'Elephant' and was the squadron's first operational aircraft. The elephant is also a species native to India, reflecting the squadron's time there during the Second World War.

The squadron's motto is Quam celerrime ad astra (Latin for 'With all speed to the Stars').

== Aircraft operated ==
- Martynside G.100 and 102 (1916–1917)
- Airco DH.4 (1917–1918)
- de Havilland DH.9 (1918–1919)
- Westland Wapiti (1930–1940)
- de Havilland Tiger Moth (1939–1940)
- Hawker Hart (1939–1940)
- Bristol Blenheim Mk.IF (1940–1942)
- Bristol Beaufighter Mk.VIF (1942–1944)
- de Havilland Mosquito Mk.II (1943)
- de Havilland Mosquito Mk.VI (1943–1944)
- Bristol Beaufighter Mk.X (1943–1946)
- Douglas Dakota (1947–1950)
- English Electric Canberra B.2 (1953–1957)
- Avro Vulcan B.2 (1961–1972)
- Avro Vulcan B.2 (MRR) (1973–1983)
- Panavia Tornado GR1 (1983–1993)
- Boeing Chinook (1993–present)

== Battle honours ==
No. 27 Squadron has received the following battle honours. Those marked with an asterisk (*) may be emblazoned on the squadron standard.

- Western Front (1916–1918)*
- Somme (1916)*
- Arras (1916)*
- Ypres (1917)*
- Cambrai (1917)*
- Somme (1918)*
- Lys (1918)*
- Amiens (1918)*
- Hindenburg Line (1918)*
- Mahsud (1920)
- Waziristan (1920–1925)
- Mohmund (1927)
- North West Frontier (1930–1931)
- Mohmund (1933)
- North West Frontier (1935–1939)
- Malaya (1941–1942)*
- Arakan (1942–1944)*
- North Burma (1944)*
- Burma (1944–1945)
- Gulf (1991)
- Afghanistan (2001–2014)*
- Iraq (2003–2011)

== See also ==
- List of Royal Air Force aircraft squadrons
