= History of the Royal Air Force =

The history of the Royal Air Force, the air force of the United Kingdom, spans a century of British military aviation.

The RAF was founded on 1 April 1918, towards the end of the First World War by merging the Royal Flying Corps and the Royal Naval Air Service. After the war, the RAF was greatly reduced in size and during the inter-war years was used for policing operations in the British Empire. The RAF underwent rapid expansion prior to and during the Second World War. During the war it was responsible for the aerial defence of Great Britain, the strategic bombing campaign against Germany and tactical support to the British Army around the world.

During the Cold War, the main role of the RAF was the defence of the continent of Europe against potential attack by the Soviet Union, including holding the British nuclear deterrent for a number of years. After the end of the Cold War, the RAF took part in several large scale operations, including the Gulf War, the Kosovo War, the War in Afghanistan, and the Iraq War.

== Formation and the inter-war years ==
=== Formation ===
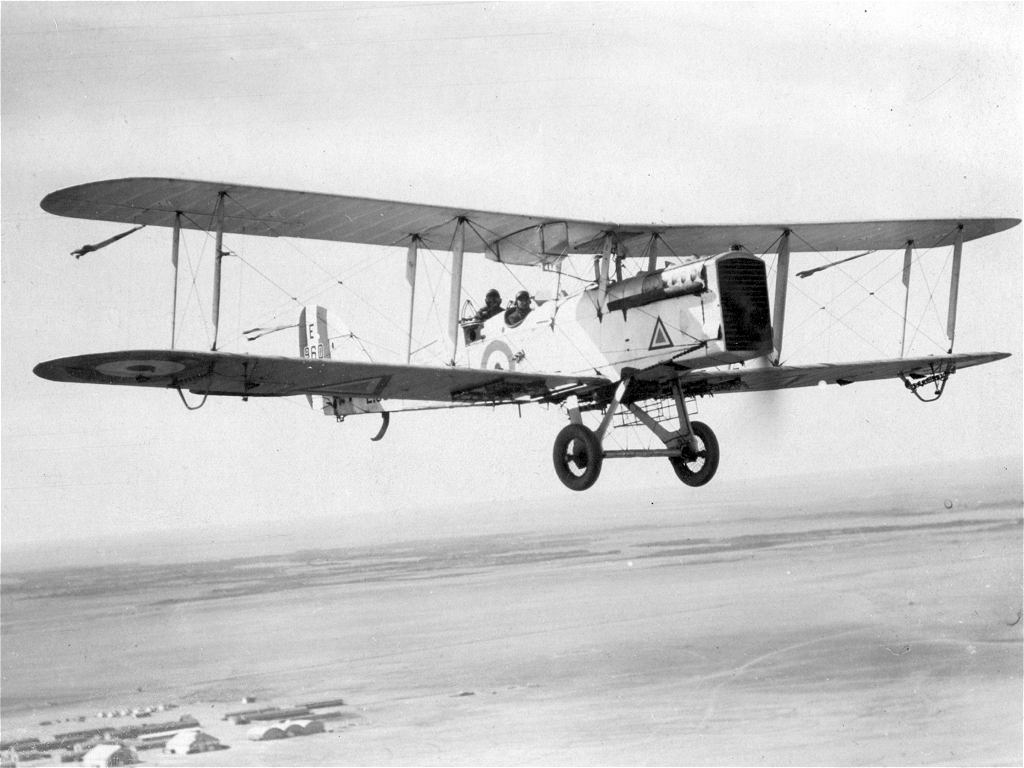
Airco DH.9A

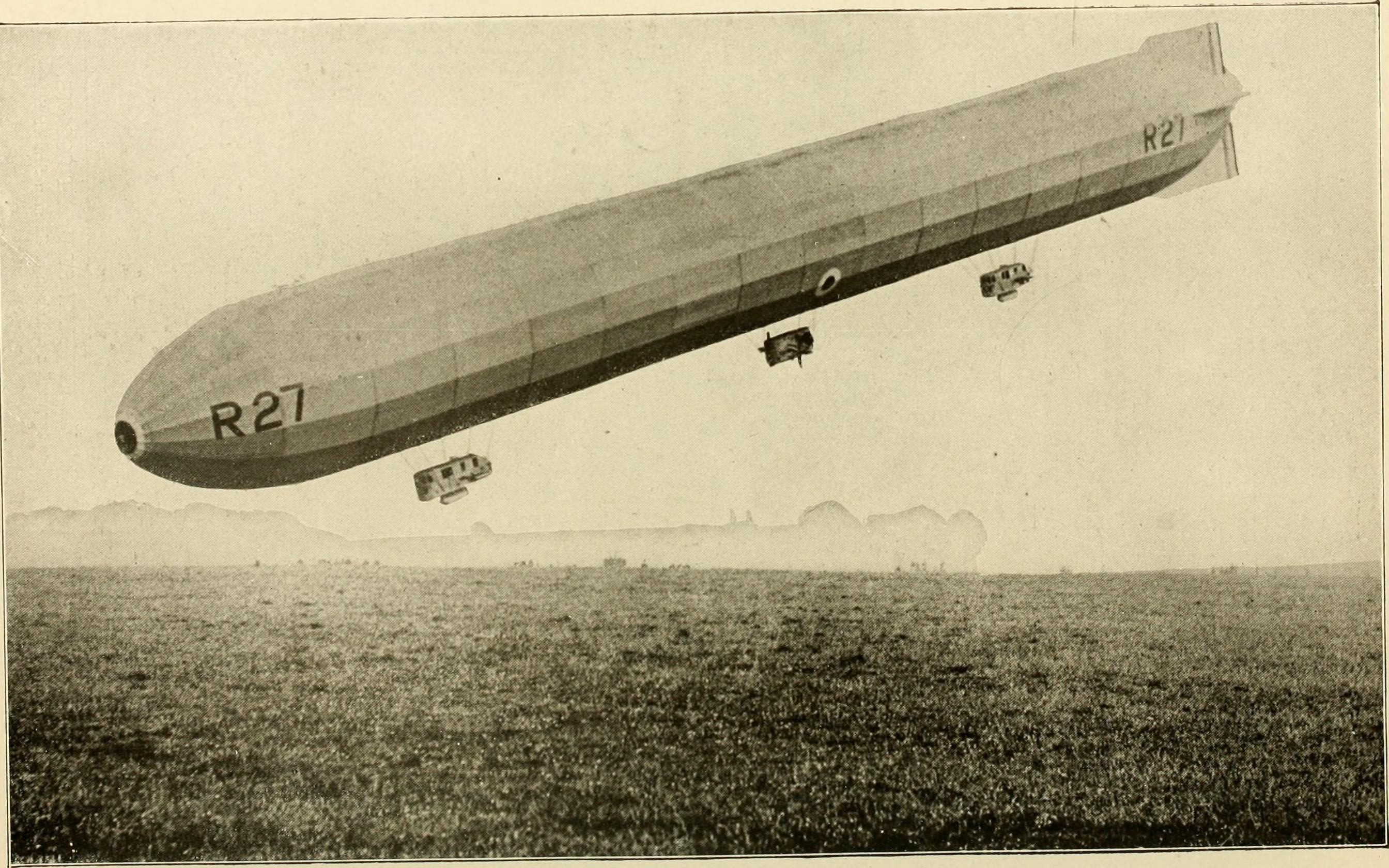
R 27 airship 1918

While the British were not the first to make use of heavier-than-air military aircraft, the RAF is the world's oldest independent air force: the first air force to become independent of army or navy control. The RAF was founded on 1 April 1918 by the amalgamation of the Royal Flying Corps and the Royal Naval Air Service and was controlled by the British Government Air Ministry which had been established three months earlier. The Royal Flying Corps had been born out of the Air Battalion of the Royal Engineers and was under the control of the British Army. The Royal Naval Air Service was its naval equivalent and was controlled by the Admiralty. The decision to merge the two services and create an independent air force was a response to the events of World War I, the first war in which air power made a significant impact. The creation of the new force was based on the Smuts Report prepared by Field Marshal Jan Smuts for the Imperial War Cabinet on which he served.

To emphasise the merger of both military and naval aviation in the new service, many of the titles of officers were deliberately chosen to be of a naval character, such as flight lieutenant, wing commander, group captain, and air commodore.

The newly created RAF was the most powerful air force in the world on its creation, with over 20,000 aircraft and over 300,000 personnel (including the Women's Royal Air Force). The squadrons of the RFC kept their numerals while those of the RNAS were renumbered from 201 onwards. At the time of the merger, the Navy's air service had 55,066 officers and men, 2,949 aircraft, 103 airships and 126 coastal stations. The remaining personnel and aircraft came from the RFC. A memorial to the RAF was commissioned after the war in central London. The RAF's last known surviving founder member was the World War I veteran Henry Allingham who died in 2009 aged 113.

The contact patrols flown by RAF fighter aircraft were key to stopping the Imperial Germany Army's spring offensive in 1918. Smuts and Hugh Trenchard believed that aircraft could achieve a breakthrough on the Western Front by attaining air supremacy over the front lines, but this strategy was never fully implemented.

Following the end of World War I and the accompanying British defence cuts, the newly independent (and still temporary) RAF waited nine months to see if it would be retained by the Cabinet. 6,500 officers, all holding temporary commissions or seconded from the Army and Navy, applied for permanent commissions. The Cabinet sanctioned a maximum of 1,500 and the Air Ministry offered 1,065 to the applicants, publishing the first list on 1 August 1919, 75% of them short-term (two to five years). The service as a whole had been reduced in strength to 35,500.

=== Policing the Empire ===
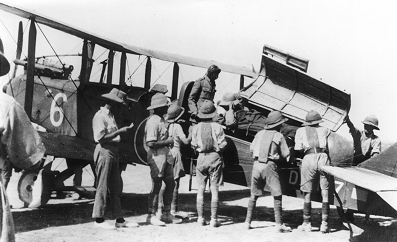
An RAF aircraft in Somaliland

The RAF took up the task of policing the British Empire from the air. It was argued that the use of air power would prove to be a more cost-effective way of controlling large areas than by using conventional land forces. Sir Hugh Trenchard, the Chief of the Air Staff, had formulated ideas about the use of aircraft in colonial policing and these were first put into practice in 1920 when the RAF and imperial ground units defeated rebel Somaliland dervishes. The following year, in 1921, the RAF was given responsibility for all British forces in Iraq with the task of 'policing' the tribal unrest. The RAF also saw service in Afghanistan in 1925, where they were employed independently for the first time in their history, then again in 1928, when following the outbreak of civil war, the British Legation and some European diplomatic staff based in Kabul were cut off.

=== Activities in Great Britain ===
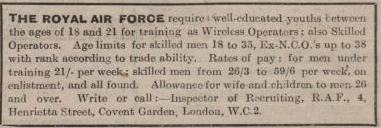
An RAF advertisement recruiting radio operators, from the 21 December 1923 edition of The Radio Times

It was during the inter-war years that the RAF had to fight for its survival – some questioned the need for a separate air force, especially in peacetime. To prevent itself being disbanded and its duties returned to the Army and the Navy, the RAF spent considerable energies keeping itself in the public eye by such things as the annual Hendon Air Show, supporting a team for the Schneider Trophy air racing competition, and by producing documentary films. In 1936, a reorganisation of RAF command saw the creation of Fighter Command, Bomber Command and Coastal Command.

=== Naval aviation ===
The creation of the RAF removed all aircraft and flying personnel from the Navy, although the Admiralty remained in control of aircraft carriers. On 1 April 1924, the Fleet Air Arm of the Royal Air Force was formed under Air Ministry control. It consisted of those RAF units that were normally embarked on aircraft carriers and fighting ships. The Chief of the Air Staff, Lord Trenchard, his air staff and his successors argued that "air is one and indivisible" and hence that naval aviation was properly the responsibility of the RAF. The Admiralty took the opposite view and, during the first half of the 1920s, pressed hard for the return of naval aviation to their control. It has been argued that the British defence arrangements in the inter-war years had a serious impact upon the doctrinal development of British naval air power as the Navy lacked experienced naval aviators.

During the 1920s and first half of the 1930s, Government spending on the RAF was limited and the air staff put a higher priority on strategic bombing than on naval aviation. The result of this was that by the late 1930s the Fleet Air Arm was equipped with outdated aircraft – like the Fairey Swordfish three-man biplane torpedo bomber, among others – in limited numbers, as the rival Imperial Japanese Naval Air Service began using the Nakajima B5N all-metal low-winged monoplane torpedo bomber from the IJN's aircraft carriers by 1938 as one example of how the Fleet Air Arm's aviation technology was literally "being left behind" by one of its future foes. By 1936, the Admiralty were once again campaigning for the return of naval aviation to their control. This time they were successful and on 30 July 1937, the Admiralty took over responsibility for the administration of the Fleet Air Arm. Under two years later, on 24 May 1939, the Fleet Air Arm was returned to full Admiralty control under the Inskip Award and renamed the Air Branch of the Royal Navy.

=== Strategic bombing ===
The RAF developed its doctrine of strategic bombing after taking influence from the bombing of Britain during World War I by the German Luftstreitkräfte. Trenchard established the Independent Air Force, the world's first strategic bombing unit, to carry out similar British air raids on the German Empire. This led to the construction of long-range bombers and became the basic philosophy in the Second World War.

== World War II (1939–1945) ==
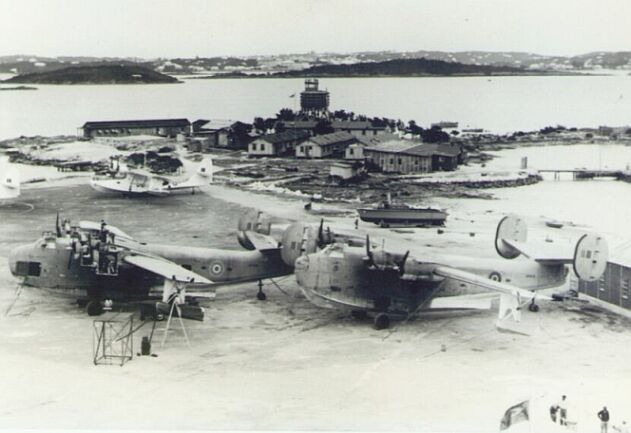
RAF Darrell's Island, in the Imperial fortress colony of Bermuda, during WWII. This was the pre-war civil airport taken over by the RAF for staging trans-Atlantic Ferry Command and Transport Command flights, including that of Prime Minister Winston Churchill on his return from the United States aboard BOAC Boeing 314 "Berwick" in 1942. The Royal Air Force had also operated Royal Naval Air Station Bermuda until 1939, and Transport Command facilities moved to Kindley Field in 1943 for landplane operations.

The RAF underwent rapid expansion following the outbreak of war against Nazi Germany in 1939. This included the training of British aircrews in British Commonwealth countries under the British Commonwealth Air Training Plan, and the secondment of many whole squadrons, and tens of thousands of individual personnel, from Commonwealth air forces. For example, by the end of the war, Royal Canadian Air Force personnel had contributed more than 30 squadrons to service with RAF formations; almost a quarter of Bomber Command's personnel were Canadian. Similarly, about nine percent of the personnel who served with the RAF in Europe and the Mediterranean were seconded from the Royal Australian Air Force. To these and other British Commonwealth personnel were later added thousands of men from other countries, including many who had fled from German-occupied Europe.

A defining period of the RAF's existence came during the Battle of Britain. Over the summer of 1940, the RAF held off the Luftwaffe in perhaps the most prolonged and complicated air campaign in history. This arguably contributed immensely to the delay and cancellation of German plans for an invasion of the United Kingdom (Operation Sea Lion). Of these few hundred RAF fighter pilots, Prime Minister Winston Churchill famously said in the House of Commons on 20 August, "Never in the field of human conflict was so much owed by so many to so few". Although, he first spoke these words upon exiting the Battle of Britain Bunker at RAF Uxbridge on 16 August. However, in recent years some military historians have controversially suggested that the RAF's actions would not have prevented an invasion and that the key deterrent was the Royal Navy's command of the sea.

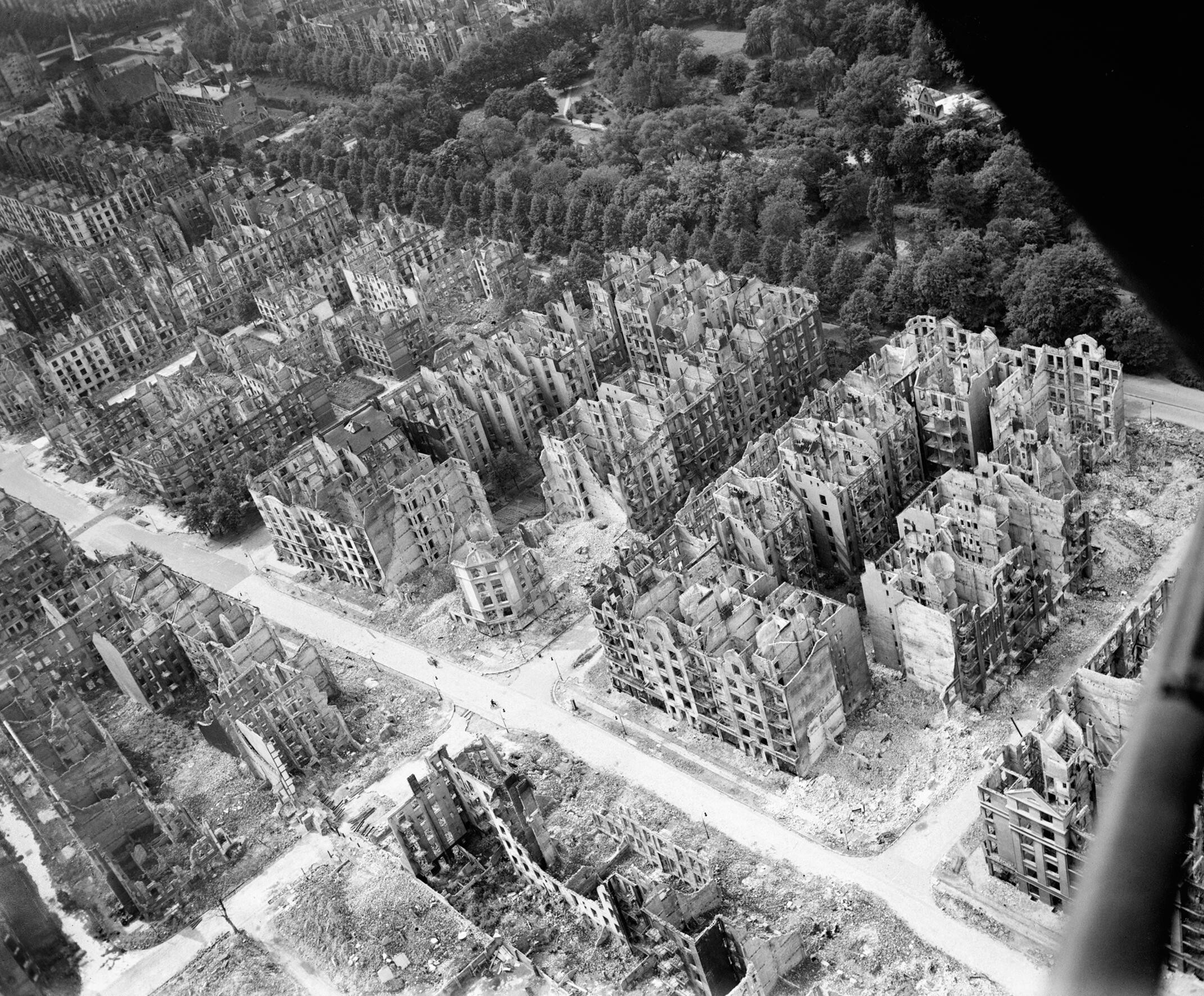
Residential area of Hamburg after the 1943 RAF attack (Operation Gomorrah)

The main RAF effort during the war was the strategic bombing campaign against Germany. From 31 May 1942 RAF Bomber Command was able to mount large-scale night raids, sometimes involving up to 1,000 aircraft. From mid-1942 increasing numbers of these aircraft were heavy four-engined bombers such as the Handley-Page Halifax and the Avro Lancaster. Noteworthy raids include Operation Millennium against Cologne, the first 1000-bomber raid; Operation Chastise, the 'Dambusters' raids on targets in the Ruhr Valley; Operation Gomorrah, the destruction of Hamburg; and the 'Battle of Berlin'. The lighter, fast two-engine de Havilland Mosquito fighter-bomber was used for tactical raids like Operation Carthage, a raid on the Gestapo headquarters in Copenhagen, as well as a night-fighter.

There exists considerable historical controversy about the ethics of large-scale firebombing attacks against German cities during the last few months of the war, such as the bombing of Dresden, the bombing of Pforzheim, the bombing of Heilbronn, and other German cities.

== 1948 Arab–Israeli War ==
Following the end of the British Mandate of Palestine, the State of Israel was founded on 14 May 1948. Egyptian forces crossed into Israeli territory as part of a wider Arab League military coalition, with the Royal Egyptian Air Force providing light bombers as well as Spitfires. On 22 May, the Egyptians attacked RAF Ramat David, believing the base had already been taken over by Israeli forces. Two Royal Egyptian Air Force Spitfire LF.IXs strafed RAF Spitfire FR.XVIIIs of No. 32 Squadron and No. 208 Squadron on the ground. Flying Officers Geoff Cooper and Roy Bowie of 208 Squadron. then took off in their Spitfire FR.XVIIIs to mount a standing patrol. Three Egyptian Spitfire LF.IXs launched a second attack, two of which were shot down by Cooper and Bowie. Flying Officers McElhaw and Hully, also of 32 Squadron, took over the standing patrol before the third wave of Egyptian Spitfires arrived. Flying Officer McElhaw shot both of these down.

Due to the confused circumstances of the 1948 Middle East conflict, the RAF found itself fighting the Jewish militias, and later, the nascent Israeli Air Force. Royal Air Force bases in the region were attacked by both sides and reconnaissance aircraft were shot down. Among others, on 7 January 1949, Flying Officer McElhaw, who participated in the action against Egyptians described above, and two other pilots, were shot down by Israeli Spitfires while reconnoitering the aftermath of air attack on an Israeli column by Egyptian aircraft.

== Cold War (1947–1990) ==
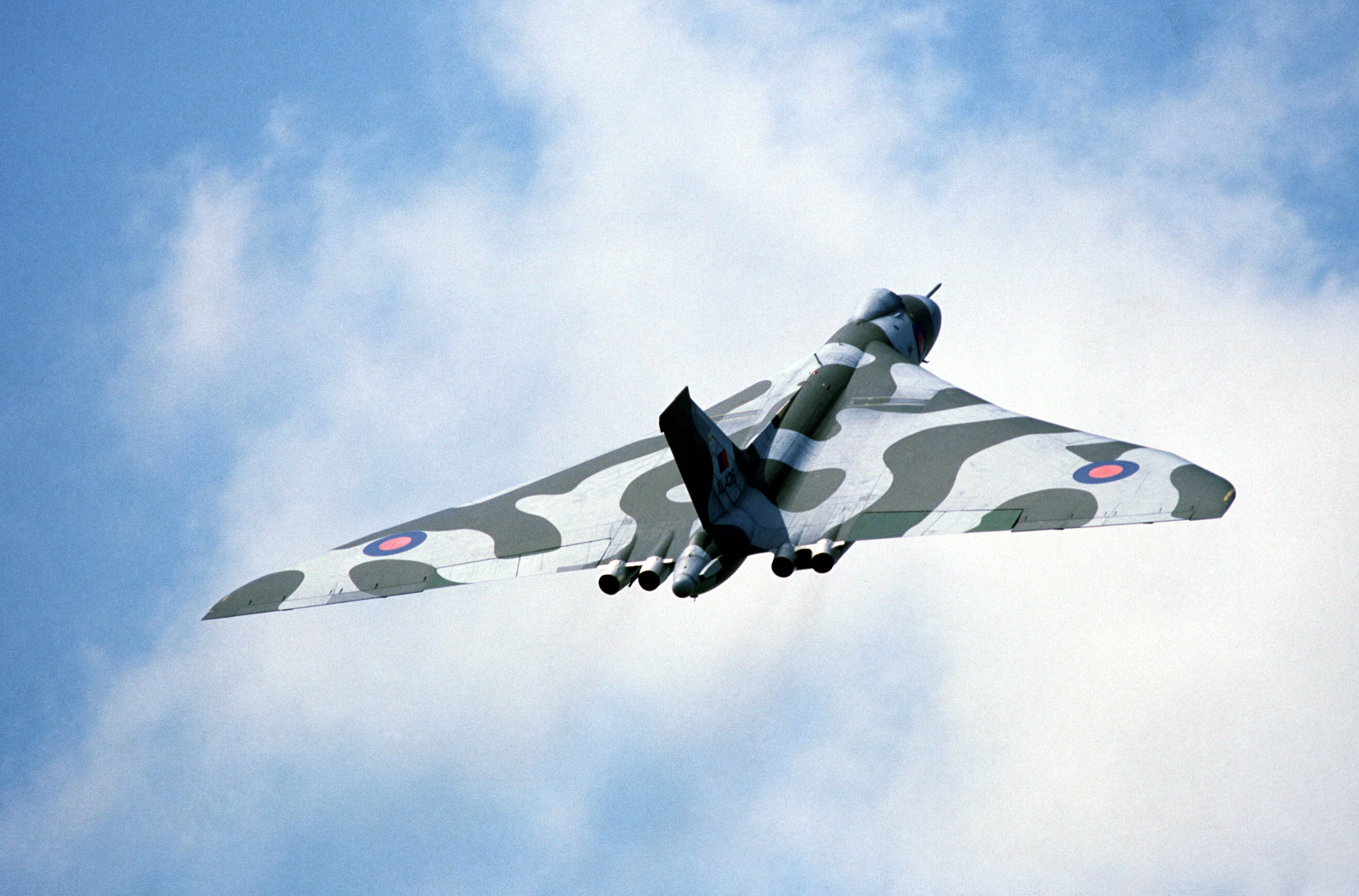
The Avro Vulcan was a strategic bomber used during the Cold War to carry conventional and nuclear bombs.

After victory in World War II, the RAF was to be further re-organized, as technological advances in air warfare saw the arrival of jet fighters and bombers. The first significant Cold War action of the RAF was its support to the Berlin Airlift in 1948 and 1949 which was originally designated Operation Knicker and Operation Carter-Paterson and later titled Operation Plainfare.

Although the United Kingdom did not base any RAF squadrons in Korea during the Korean War, the Independent reported that 41 RAF officers seconded to serve with the United States Air Force, several RAF pilots saw action while on exchange with the USAF, mainly flying F-86 Sabres, they were credited with seven kills. At least one pilot was killed when his F-84E Thunderjet was shot down by anti-aircraft fire on 2 January 1952 as he attempted to strafe a column of trucks near Sunsan, a village north of Pyongyang. Other RAF pilots flew Meteors in Royal Australian Air Force squadrons on ground support attacks. Two flights of Army Cooperation aircraft flew in support of artillery spotting and reconnaissance. In addition, three RAF squadrons of flying boats based in Singapore detached one squadron at a time on a monthly rotational basis to Japan and flew maritime and meteorological reconnaissance missions in the Yellow Sea and Tushima Straits.

To complement the UK nuclear weapons which were difficult to manufacture quickly, in 1958 the RAF and other NATO nations were provided with American nuclear weapons under Project E as a stopgap measure. The UK had manufactured less than 50 of the 200 atomic and hydrogen bombs it required at that stage. The RAF V bomber squadrons took sole responsibility for carrying the UK's nuclear deterrent until the development of the Royal Navy's Polaris submarines. Following the introduction of Polaris in 1968 the RAF's strategic nuclear role was reduced to a tactical one, using the WE.177 gravity bombs. This tactical role was continued by the V bombers into the 1980s and until 1998 by Tornado GR1s.

The primary role of the RAF in the Cold War years was the defence of Western Europe against potential attack by the Soviet Union, with many squadrons based in West Germany. With the decline of the British Empire, global operations were scaled back, and RAF Far East Air Force was disbanded on 31 October 1971.

Despite this, the RAF fought in many battles in the Cold War period. In June 1948 the RAF commenced Operation Firedog against Malayan terrorists during the Malayan Emergency. Operations continued for the next 12 years until 1960 with aircraft flying out of RAF Tengah and RAF Butterworth. The RAF played a minor role in the Korean War, with flying boats taking part. From 1953 to 1956 the RAF Avro Lincoln squadrons carried out anti-Mau Mau operations in Kenya using its base at RAF Eastleigh. The Suez Crisis in 1956 saw a large RAF role, with aircraft operating from RAF Akrotiri and RAF Nicosia on Cyprus and RAF Luqa and RAF Hal Far on Malta as part of Operation Musketeer. The Konfrontasi against Indonesia in the early 1960s did see use of RAF aircraft, but due to a combination of deft diplomacy and selective ignoring of certain events by both sides, it never developed into a full-scale war.

=== Belize (1975–1994) ===
Belize (the former British Honduras) had been threatened for a number of years by Guatemala which claimed rights to the territory. In 1975 following the breakdown in negotiations between the United Kingdom and Guatemala, Guatemalan troops were active close to the border, and in October 1975 three Westland Puma helicopters were flown out to Belize Airport as the British garrison was reinforced to a 1,000 troops. In November six Hawker Siddeley Harriers of 1 Squadron were flown to Belize to provide some defence of the border and support the troops. By April 1976 the threat had reduced the Harriers were flown back to the United Kingdom. Further negotiations failed to come to an agreement and in June 1977 the garrison was again reinforced with six Harriers returning in July. Although Belize was not invaded the Pumas and Harriers were kept in Belize, the three Pumas as 1563 Flight (manned in rotation from 33 and 230 Squadrons, and 1417 Flight with four Harriers (manned in rotation from 1, 3 and 4 Squadrons). The airfield was defended by the RAF Regiment with Rapier and Bofors L40/70 detachments. While there was a civil war in Guatemala in the 1970s and 1980s, the British forces provided a deterrent as well as using the country for jungle warfare training. In 1991 Guatemala recognised Belize and the Harriers left in July 1993 and the Pumas in 1994.

=== Falklands War ===
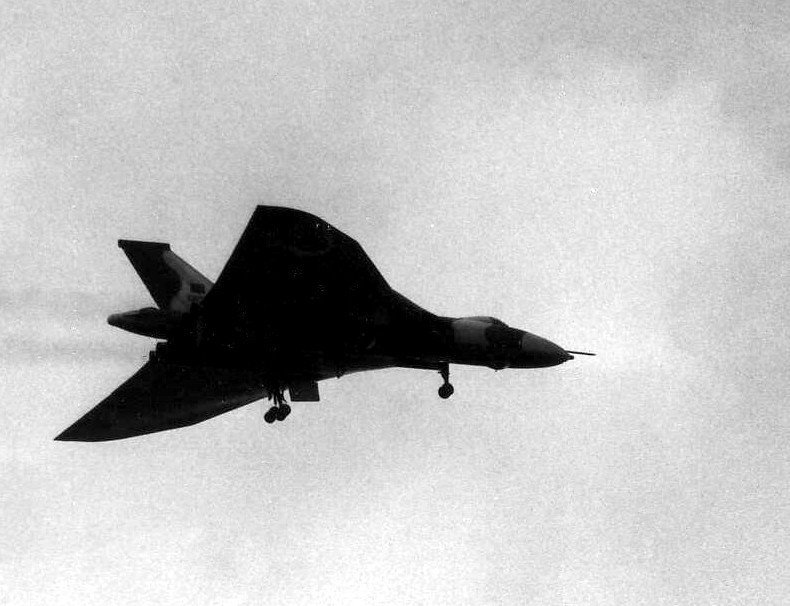
Vulcan over Ascension Island on 18 May 1982

The Falklands War in 1982 was mainly fought by the Navy and Army due to the distance of the battlefield from friendly airfields; however RAF aircraft were deployed in the mid-Atlantic at RAF Ascension Island and on board the Navy's aircraft carriers alongside aircraft of the Fleet Air Arm. A detachment from No. 1 Squadron was deployed to the British Fleet during the War, operating from HMS Hermes and flying ground attack missions against Argentine forces. RAF pilots also flew Royal Navy Sea Harriers in the air-to-air combat role and four RAF pilots shot down five Argentine aircraft.

The most high-profile RAF missions in this conflict were the famous Black Buck raids using Avro Vulcans flying from Ascension Island. However, the Service did many other things during the conflict, with its helicopters in the Falklands themselves, its Harrier GR3s flying from HMS Hermes, its fighter aircraft protecting Ascension, Nimrod MR2 maritime patrol aircraft scanning the South Atlantic, and tanker and transport fleet helping in the enormous logistical effort required for the war.

After the war, the RAF remained in the South Atlantic to provide air defence to the Falkland Islands. The mid-Atlantic base on Ascension Island continued to be used as a staging post for the air bridge between Great Britain and the Falkland Islands. In 1984 RAF Mount Pleasant was built to provide a fighter and transport facility on the islands thereby strengthening the defence capacity of the British Forces. Various radar sites were established and a detachment of the RAF Regiment provided anti-aircraft support until that role was transferred to the Royal Artillery. In 2009 the air defence F3s were replaced by four Typhoons which are based at RAF Mount Pleasant.

== 1990–2000 ==
=== Gulf War ===
During the build-up to the Gulf War, RAF fighters were based in Saudi Arabia and Kuwait. On 17 January 1991, the main air campaign began and over 100 RAF aircraft took part in virtually every conceivable role. It marked an important turning point in the RAF's history as it was the first time the service had used precision-guided munitions in significant amounts. In the years following the end of the war, the RAF were involved in operations to enforce the no-fly zones over Iraq and the Service took part in the Bombing of Iraq in 1998.

=== Balkans ===
In 1993, RAF Tornado F3s and AWACS aircraft contributed to Operation Deny Flight, NATO's operation to restrict airspace movements over Bosnia and Herzegovina. The operation continued until late 1995.

The Kosovo War in 1999 saw the RAF fight over Europe for the first time since World War II. During the bombing of Yugoslavia, the RAF operated the Harrier GR7 and Tornado ground attack jets as well as an array of support aircraft.

== 2001–present ==
=== "War on Terror" ===
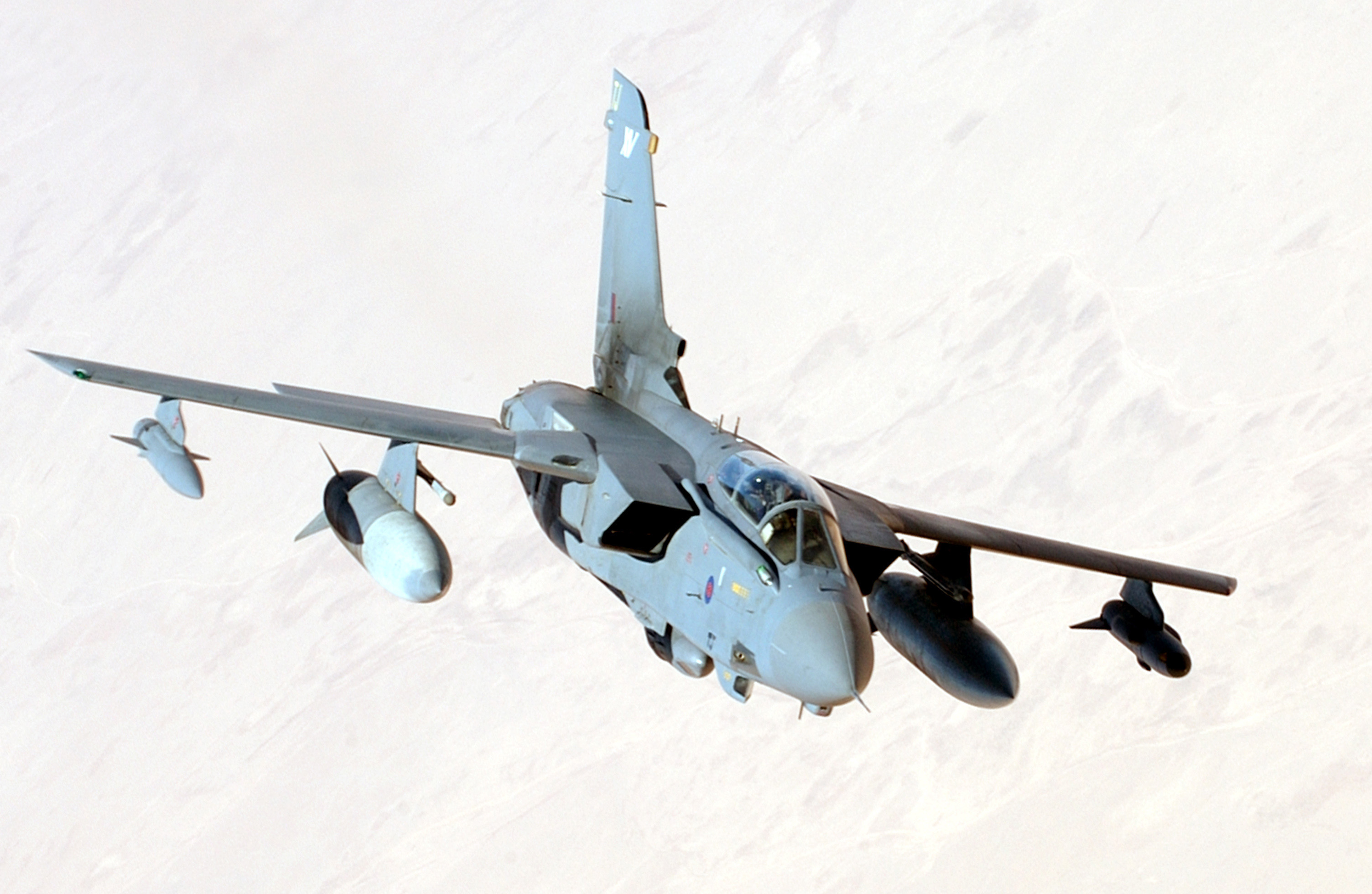
RAF GR4 Tornado fighter on a combat mission over Iraq during Operation Telic.

As part of the British contribution (codenamed Operation Veritas) to the 2001 invasion of Afghanistan at the start of the War in Afghanistan, the RAF provided support to the United States by operating air-to-air refuelling tankers and reconnaissance aircraft as well as proving the use of its bases. Chinook helicopters have provided airlift support to coalition forces. In late 2004, as part of Operation Herrick, RAF Harriers were based at Kandahar Airfield in Afghanistan, operating in the close air support role against the Taliban. The Harriers were replaced by an equivalent force of Tornados GR4 in spring 2009. From March to May 2002, No. 39 Squadron took part in Operation Ramson, looking for terrorist threats in Somalia.

The 2003 invasion of Iraq saw a large RAF deployment to the Gulf, including RAF strike aircraft. The RAF also staged the base for the 4 US B-52 Bombers which attacked Iraq almost every night. The only RAF losses were a friendly fire incident when an RAF Tornado jet was shot down by a US Patriot missile killing both pilot and Weapons Systems Officer due to the Patriot missile mistakenly recognising the Tornado as a Mig, and a Hercules transport plane shot down by ground fire killing the ten personnel on board just after takeoff from the US controlled airfield. Following the invasion occupation of southern Iraq by British Forces, the RAF was deployed at Basra. As part of Operation Telic, Merlin, Puma and Chinook helicopters operated from Basra, protected by the RAF Regiment, forming 903 Expeditionary Air Wing.

In January 2013, the BBC reported that the RAF supported Operation Serval- the French-led operation against Islamist militants in Mali. The UK's contribution was codenamed Operation Newcombe, C-17 Globemasters from No. 99 Squadron transported French armoured vehicles from French Évreux Air Base to Bamako. The BBC also reported that the RAF deployed a Sentinel R1 aircraft at the request of the French for surveillance support.

The Guardian reported that the RAF conducted Operation Turus in response the Chibok schoolgirls kidnapping by Boko Haram in Nigeria in April 2014. A source involved with the Operation told the Observer that "The girls were located in the first few weeks of the RAF mission," and that "We [RAF] offered to rescue them, but the Nigerian government declined," this was because it viewed any action to be taken as a "national issue," and for it to be resolved by Nigerian intelligence and security services, the source added that the girls were then tracked by the aircraft as they were dispersed into progressively smaller groups over the following months. As of 4 March 2017, 195 out of the 276 of the girls kidnapped are still missing.

The RAF is currently participating in the International military intervention against ISIL, the British participation is codenamed Operation Shader. Flying out of RAF bases in Cyprus, they have been known to have destroyed multiple ISIL targets and deliver humanitarian aid in Iraq (2014–present) as well as carry out surveillance missions in Syria.

In 2015, RAF Pumas deployed to Afghanistan as part of Operation Toral, to provide helicopter support to NATO forces conducting the ongoing training and advisor mission with the Afghan Security forces.

In September 2018, Forces.net reported that RAF Chinook helicopters and personnel had been deployed to Mali to support Operation Barkhane- the continued French counter-terrorist operation in Mali.

=== Libyan civil war ===
In 2011 the RAF played a significant role in the NATO intervention in Libya. The British participation was codenamed Operation Ellamy and the RAF contribution involved the deployment of Typhoon multirole fighters, Tornado GR4 interdictor/strike aircraft, Sentry AEW.1 AWACS aircraft, a Nimrod R1 signals intelligence aircraft, (Note: From Jane's Defence Weekly, 16 March 2011, operational requirements forced the Royal Air Force to deploy one of its two remaining Nimrod R1s two weeks before they were due to be withdrawn.) a Sentinel R1 airborne standoff radar aircraft, VC10 air-to-air refuelling tankers and TriStar air-to-air refuelling tankers.

=== Other operations and activities ===
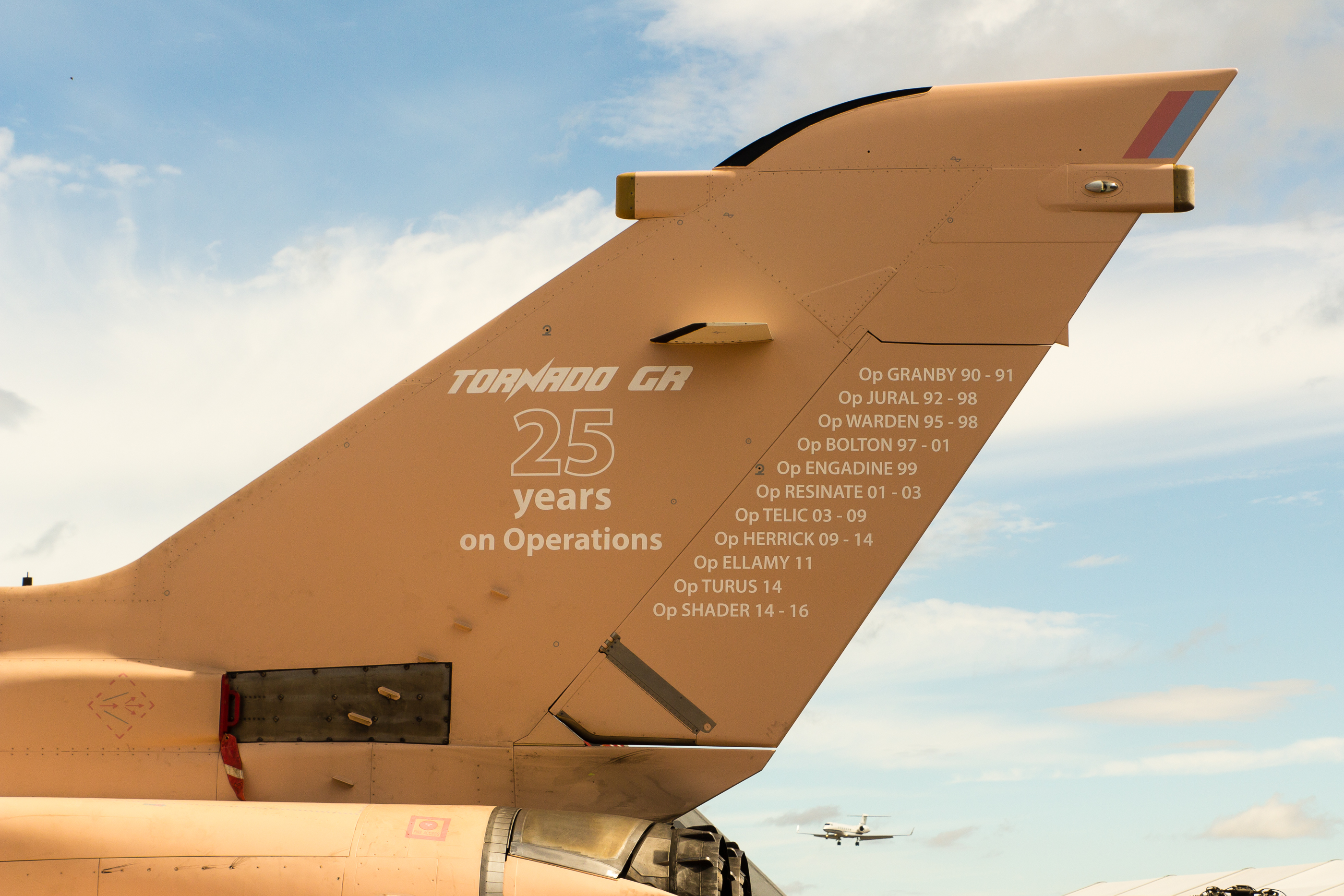
Tail of Tornado GR4 ZG750, marking 25 years of Tornado GR operations, at the 2016 Farnborough Airshow.

In 2004, four RAF Panavia Tornado F.3s deployed to the Baltic States for three months to provide the British contribution to the NATO-led Baltic Air Policing operation and in 2005 support and transport aircraft were dispatched to South East Asia following the 2004 Indian Ocean earthquake disaster to provide aid relief support.

The RAF's 90th anniversary was commemorated on 1 April 2008 by a flypast of 9 Red Arrows and 4 Typhoons along the Thames, in a straight line from just south of London City Airport Tower Bridge, the London Eye, the RAF Memorial and (at 13.00) the Ministry of Defence building.

In September 2016, it was reported that four RAF Typhoon fighter jets from No. 2 Squadron (with supporting Voyager aircraft from No. 10 and 101 Squadrons, as well as C-17 Globemaster transport aircraft) were deployed to South Korea to take part in Exercise Invincible Shield: which marked the first time that South Korea hosted a major air exercise with an air force other than the United States. The Exercise's goal was to enhance interoperability between the RAF, Korean Air Force and USAF, whilst deepening the UK and Republic of Korea's partnership in security and defence. In October 2016, it was reported that they were also deployed to Japan as part of Invincible Shield where they took part in their first-ever joint exercise drills with the Japanese air self-defence force, South Korean and USAF air assets also took part in the exercises. The Japan's defence ministry said to the Guardian that "The purpose of this exercise is to enhance tactical skills of Japan air self-defence force unit and strengthen Japan-UK defence cooperation. We have no specific country or region in our mind," South Korean and US officials said the drill would improve the allies' ability to strike key targets in North Korea, including military facilities and those linked to the regime's leader, Kim Jong-un; the drill in Japan was also known as Exercise Guardian North 16 and it ended in early November. The exercises in South Korea included the first UK-Republic of Korea Fighter exercise, that took place from 4 to 11 November.

The RAF celebrated its 100th anniversary on 1 April 2018 and to commemorate the achievement, a range of special events and celebrations will take place throughout the year.

Shorter range, tactical-airlift transport was provided by the Lockheed Martin C-130J Hercules, known as the Hercules C4 (C-130J-30) and Hercules C5 (C-130J) in RAF service, based at RAF Brize Norton and flown by No. 47 Squadron. Twenty-five C-130Js were originally ordered in December 1994 (fifteen C4s and ten C5s), the first Hercules C4 to be delivered was ZH865 in August 1998, with the first Hercules C5 (ZH881) in May 1999. The 2010 SDSR called for the retirement of the Hercules fleet by 2022, with the 2015 SDSR amending this to maintaining the fourteen Hercules C4s until 2030. The draw-down of the Hercules C5 fleet began in 2016, with two left in service by December 2020. The fourteen C4 extended variants were scheduled to retire on 31 March 2035. However, due to the crash of Hercules C4 ZH873 in August 2017, one Hercules C5 was retained to keep the fleet at 14 aircraft. The 2021 Defence Command Paper brought forward the retirement of the Hercules fleet to 2023. The Hercules was retired from RAF service on 30 June 2023.

On 9 May 2026, a RAF A400M dropped a specialist UK military team that executed a first-of-its-kind emergency humanitarian mission, parachuting onto Tristan da Cunha - an archipelago in the South Atlantic Ocean considered to be among the world's most remote islands - to treat a British national with suspected hantavirus. A local island resident who disembarked from the virus-hit cruise ship MV Hondius. Oxygen supplies at the island's hospital had reached a critical level. The territory normally operates with just a two-person medical team. Six paratroopers and two military clinicians from the 16 Air Assault Brigade launched the mission. Because of the specialised medical care required, an intensive care nurse and an intensive care doctor were strapped to paratroopers for tandem jumps. The team flew 6,788 km from RAF Brize Norton to Ascension Island. They then flew over 3,000 km to the drop zone, supported by mid-air refuelling from an RAF Voyager. Medics battled winds exceeding 25 mph to land safely on the island's rocky golf course. Simultaneously, an RAF A400M aircraft air-dropped 3.3 tonnes of vital medical aid and oxygen.

== Number of personnel ==
Following the end of World War I, the RAF was greatly reduced in size and only rebuilt in significant number in the years immediately preceding World War II. At its peak during World War II, there were over one million RAF servicemen. Following the demobilisation after World War II, the RAF has steadily declined in numbers.

Year	1918	1951	1975	1985	1993	1997	2005/2006	2009	2011	2012	2015
Regular	316,170	148,900	95,000	93,400	80,900	56,900	48,700	43,800	40,090	38,930	31,830
National Service	N/A	88,900	N/A	N/A	N/A	N/A	N/A	N/A	N/A	N/A	N/A
Regular Reserve	N/A	N/K	N/K	29,800	46,100	45,400	35,000	35,160	6,900	6,660	2,220
Volunteer Reserve	N/A	18,100	N/K	1,200	1,800	1,400	1,400	1,480	1,360	1,360	2,220

== See also ==
- List of Royal Air Force operations
- List of all aircraft current and former of the United Kingdom
- Future of the Royal Air Force
- Royal Air Force Museum London and Royal Air Force Museum Cosford, museums dedicated to the history of aviation, and the Royal Air Force in particular.
- Structure of the Royal Air Force

== Sources and further reading ==
- Bowyer, Chaz (1988). RAF Operations 1918–1938. London: William Kimber. ISBN 0-7183-0671-6.
- Finn, C. J. et al. (2004). Air Publication 3003 - A Brief History of the Royal Air Force. HMSO
- Flintham, Vic (2009). High Stakes - Britain's Air Arms in Action 1945-1990 Pen and Sword ISBN 978 1 84415 815 7
- Chant, Christopher (1993). The History of the RAF. Regency House Publishing. ISBN 1-85361-126-3
- Ferté, Philip Joubert de la. The Birds and the Fishes: The Story of Coastal Command. Hutchinson. 1960. (No ISBN) OCLC 223965469.
- Halpenny, Bruce, To Shatter the Sky: Bomber Airfield at War (ISBN 978-0-85059-678-6)
- Halpenny, Bruce Fight for the Sky: Stories of Wartime Fighter Pilots (ISBN 978-0-85059-749-3)
- Orange, Vincent (1990). Coningham: A Biography of Air Marshal Sir Arthur Coningham Methuen Publishing (ISBN 978-0413145802)
- Robinson, Derek (2005). Invasion 1940: The truth about the Battle of Britain and what stopped Hitler Constable ISBN 1845291514
- Till, Geoffey (1979). Air Power and the Royal Navy, 1914–1945: An historical survey Macdonald's and Janes ISBN 0354012045

=== Historiography ===
- MacKenzie, S. P. "Per Ardua: Achievements, issues, and opportunities in writing the history of the Royal Air Force." War & Society 39.4 (2020): 310-325.
