= Ronald Ivelaw-Chapman =

Royal Air Force Air Chief Marshal (1899-1978)

Sir Ronald Ivelaw-Chapman
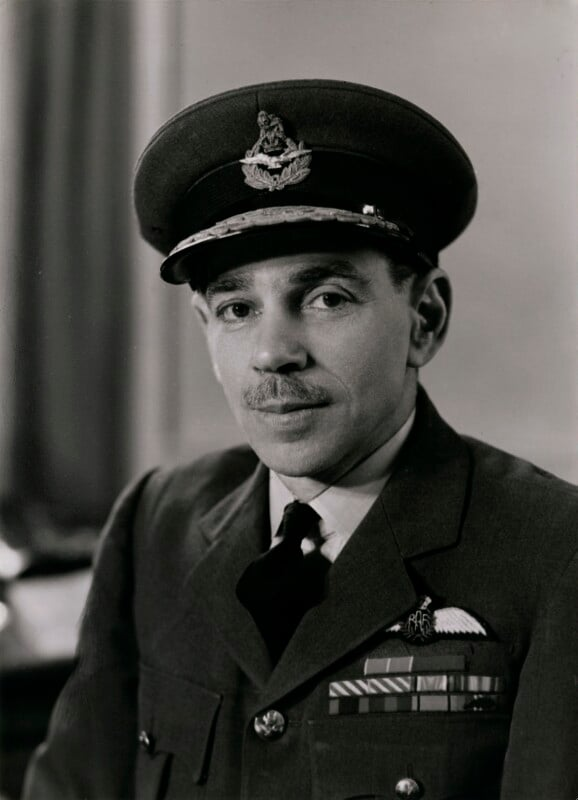
- Ivelaw-Chapman in 1952
- Born: 17 January 1899; British Guiana
- Died: 28 April 1978 (aged 79)
- Military career
- Allegiance: United Kingdom
- Branch: British Army (1917–18); Royal Air Force (1918–57)
- Service years: 1917–1957
- Rank: Air Chief Marshal
- Nickname: Chaps
- Commands: Home Command (1952); Indian Air Force (1950–51); No. 38 Group (1945–46); RAF Elsham Wolds (1943–44); RAF Linton-on-Ouse (1940–41)
- Conflicts: First World War; Kabul Airlift; Second World War
- Awards: Knight Grand Cross of the Order of the Bath; Knight Commander of the Order of the British Empire; Distinguished Flying Cross; Air Force Cross; Mentioned in Despatches
- Other work: Director of Resettlement at the Ministry of Labour; President of the Council of Cheltenham College

Air Chief Marshal Sir Ronald Ivelaw-Chapman, GCB, KBE, DFC, AFC (17 January 1899 – 28 April 1978) was a senior commander in the Royal Air Force (RAF) in the middle of the 20th century and the penultimate RAF commander-in-chief of the Indian Air Force.

== Early life and the First World War ==
Ronald Ivelaw-Chapman was born on 17 January 1899 in British Guiana. He came to England with his parents in 1903 and attended Cheltenham College. He joined the Royal Flying Corps in 1917 and served as a Bristol Fighter pilot on the Western Front with 10 Squadron in the last eleven months of the First World War.

== Between the wars ==
In January 1929, then a flight lieutenant in the RAF, Ivelaw-Chapman participated in the Kabul Airlift, a successful evacuation of the British Legation in Kabul amidst the Afghan Civil War and a bitter winter. On 27 January a Kabul-bound Vickers Victoria, piloted by Ivelaw-Chapman, was forced to make an emergency landing in the mountainous Surobi District. Rescued by an Afghan royalist officer, Ivelaw-Chapman was awarded the Air Force Cross for his handling of the incident.

== Second World War ==
At the outbreak of the Second World War Ivelaw-Chapman, now a wing commander, was part of the operations staff of RAF Bomber Command headquarters. In June 1940 he was promoted to group captain and was appointed station commander at RAF Linton-on-Ouse, a No. 4 Group bomber station near York. In 1941 he returned to a staff job at the Air Ministry involved in D-Day planning. In 1943 he was again appointed a station commander at RAF Elsham Wolds, a No. 1 Group bomber station.

On the night of the 6/7 May 1944, Ivelaw-Chapman was flying as second pilot of a No. 576 Squadron Avro Lancaster on a mission to bomb an ammunition dump at Aubigne in France. His aircraft was shot down by a Luftwaffe night fighter and Ivelaw-Chapman went on the run. Because of his experience and knowledge British prime minister Winston Churchill ordered the French Resistance to do all they could to help him return to England, he was to be killed if he was in danger of being captured by the Germans. He was captured by the Gestapo on 8 June 1944, the most senior Bomber Command officer to have been captured by the Germans. Churchill's fear was unfounded as the Germans did not realise his importance and he was treated as an ordinary prisoner of war.

== Post war ==
After the war Ivelaw-Chapman was promoted to air vice marshal and assumed command of No. 38 Group at Marks Hall, Earls Colne, Essex. In 1950 he became an air chief marshal and accepted the post of Commander-in-Chief of the newly formed Indian Air Force. On his return to the UK he became Air Officer Commanding-in-Chief at Home Command in March 1952, Deputy Chief of the Air Staff in November 1952 and Vice-Chief of the Air Staff in 1953 before he retired in 1957.

As an anecdote recently discovered, Sir Ronald was found leading the V-Force planning during Russian premier Nikita Kruschevs tenure - both Sir Ronald and Kruschev met in the UK at an Air Trade show.

"A December 1955 meeting chaired by Dickson discussed the possibilities. It agreed plans could be re-examined on the basis of mounting just one strike from dispersal airfields, and having the “serviceable element of one squadron” operating from the Class Is. The Vice-Chief of the Air Staff, Air Marshal Sir Ronald Ivelaw-Chapman, felt the “chances of getting off quickly” from those bases “with their superior facilities would be greater than from dispersal airfields”, while stressing the need for the dispersal scheme, “to convince the enemy of the inevitability of a counter-strike”.

== Family ==
In 1930 Ivelaw-Chapman married his fiancée Margaret. He had 2 children Adrianne Later Adrianne Coombes , and John "Jack" also frontline strike command and queens flight RAF.

Military offices
Preceded by Sir Thomas Elmhirst	Commander in Chief, Indian Air Force; 1950–1951	Succeeded by Sir Gerald Gibbs
Preceded by Sir Robert Foster	Air Officer Commanding-in-Chief Home Command; March – November 1952	Succeeded by Sir Harold Lydford
Preceded by Sir John Baker	Deputy Chief of the Air Staff; 1952–1953	Succeeded by Sir Thomas Pike
Preceded by Sir John Baker	Vice-Chief of the Air Staff; 1953–1957	Succeeded by Sir Edmund Hudleston
