= Kabul airlift of 1928–1929 =

Kabul Airlift
- Part of Afghan Civil War (1928–1929)
- Location: Afghanistan
- Commanded by: Sir Geoffrey Salmond
- Objective: Evacuation of British and other diplomatic staff
- Date: 23 December 1928 – 25 February 1929
- Executed by: United Kingdom
- Outcome: 586 people evacuated
- Casualties: None killed

The Kabul Airlift was an air evacuation of British and a number of European diplomatic staff and their families conducted by the Royal Air Force from Kabul between 23 December 1928 and 25 February 1929, the first large-scale air evacuation, with a total of 586 people of eleven different nationalities being rescued and taken to India. The evacuation was conducted after forces of a bandit, Habibullah Kalakani, attacked Kabul in opposition to the Afghan king, Amanullah, leading to British fears that its legation would be isolated and cut off.

Directed by Sir Geoffrey Salmond, by 15 February 1929, aircraft types available for the airlift of passengers and baggage, included seven Vickers Victoria aircraft, one Handley Page Hinaidi, 24 Airco DH.9As and two Westland Wapitis. The airlift was challenging as it required aircraft to fly over and in-between the Hindu Kush mountains that peaked 10,000 feet, and it also occurred during the bitterly cold winter, but the operation was ultimately successful.

== Background and the Afghan civil war ==
In 1928, the British Legation in Afghanistan was situated outside Kabul. Kabul is 6,000 feet above sea level. Aircraft would be required to fly over and in-between mountains that peaked 10,000 feet. In addition, it was winter and temperatures could reach as low as -17°C.

At that time, the King of Afghanistan, Amanullah introduced a series of political changes intended to bring about a more European way of life in his country. Having created a parliament, Amanullah made several speeches to his legislature in September and October 1928 which were directly opposed in the chamber by conservative factions. In the country there were protests from the mullahs and Amanullah was denounced as a kafir or unbeliever.

With increasing rumours of civil war, the British Minister at Kabul and former RAF pilot, Sir Francis Humphrys, became concerned about the safety and lines of communication to the Legation. On 3 December Humphrys sent a message to the Air Officer Commanding RAF India, Geoffrey Salmond, asking him to maintain the air mail service to Kabul and prepare extra aircraft in case of an emergency. Salmond agreed with Humphrys assessment but he lacked suitable aircraft for transporting large numbers within his command, although he did have 24 two-seater World War I vintage Airco DH.9As and two Westland Wapitis. Salmond's only appropriate aircraft, a Handley Page Hinaidi, was in Baghdad as it had temporarily been assigned to transporting Sir Denys Bray, the Indian Foreign Secretary. Salmond did request that a single Vickers Victoria be detached from the RAF in Iraq and flown to India.

The first open rebellion against Amanullah's rule came from the Shinwari tribe who were angered by the imposition of various laws, including the requirement to wear European dress, the rule that required them to send a quota of their daughters to Kabul for education and the impositions of taxes (they had never previously paid tax). The Shinwari attacked Jalalabad, cutting off Peshawar road. Amanullah responded by using his fledgling Air Force, including Russian refugee pilots, to bomb the Shinwari. The use of foreign "infidels" to subjugate Muslims roused other tribes to revolt and the country descended into civil war.

== Effects on British Legation ==
In the situation of turmoil, an opportunist leader called Habibullah Kalakani and his 3,000 disaffected tribesmen entered the conflict. They attacked Kabul on 14 December 1928, capturing the forts to the north-west of the city. Habibullah then advanced on the Asmai Heights, to the west of the Legation, and although checked by Amanullah's forces, Habibullah was not prevented from turning towards Kabul on a route which took him past the British Legation. Sir Francis met Habibullah at the gates of the Legation. With the Legation situated between the rebel army and Government-controlled city, the British were effectively isolated. The Legation lost wireless communications with British India, having sent their last message on 16 December which requested the evacuation of women and children.

== Air actions ==
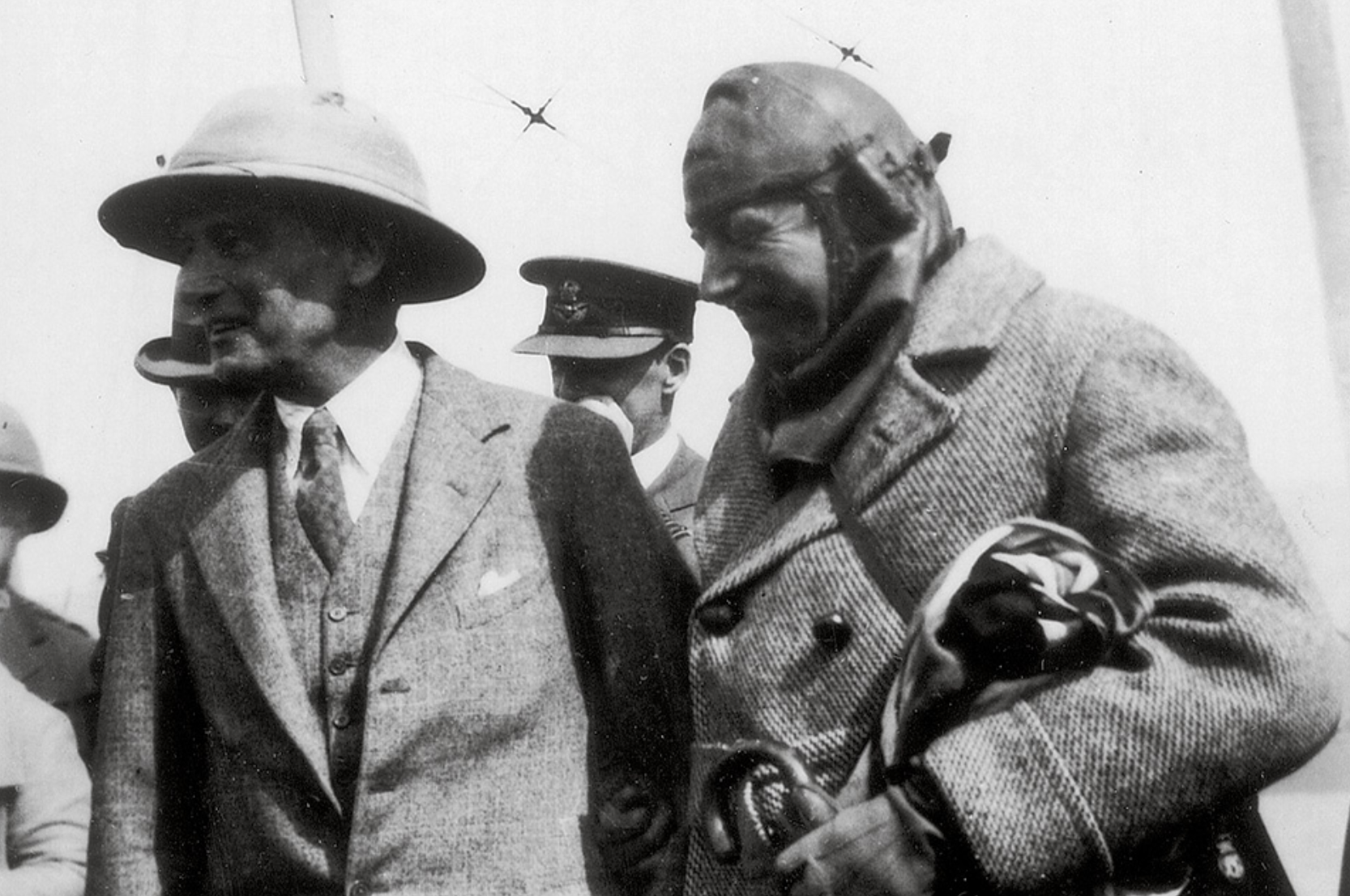
Sir Francis Humphry disembarking at Peshawar with Union Jack under his arm, 25 February 1929

The requested Victoria departed Iraq, arriving in Karachi on 17 December. The following day it travelled to Quetta and after a local check flight had been carried out, it arrived in Risalpur on 19 December. The previous day an unarmed DH.9A of No. 27 Squadron piloted by Flying Officer C. W. L. Trusk and accompanied by Leading Aircraftman G. Donaldson flew a reconnaissance mission from Kohat to the Legation with the intention of dropping a Popham panel which would enable ground-to-air signalling. However, before they could carry out their mission, small arms fire damaged their aircraft and they were forced to land at the nearby Afghan Air Force landing ground at Sherpur. Trusk and Donaldson decided to attempt to get to the Legation on foot and they ran between the opposing armies (who were exchanging fire) carrying a generator with them. Both airmen eventually made it to the Legation where they used the generator to power its wireless and re-establish intermittent communications with Peshawar and Miranshah.

From 19 to 22 December, several DH.9As flew over the Legation. Although no landing was attempted, a fully working wireless set and other items were dropped by parachute. Evacuation began on 23 December, when a Vickers Victoria and a few smaller planes landed on Sherpur. That day, the women and children were escorted to the aerodrome and airlifted to Peshawar.

Situation deteriorated on January 14 when Habibullah entered Kabul city, and a decision was made to evacuate the remaining British personnel, along with expatriates from other nations as well as members of the Afghan royal family. The last planes left Sherpur airfield on 25 February, taking Sir Francis Humphrys to Peshawar.

The whole evacuation was done in 84 sorties.

== Aviators ==
The operation was commanded by Sir Geoffrey Salmond. It was superintended by Group captain R. P. Mills. Air Vice-Marshal Robert Brooke-Popham, air officer commanding Iraq, had arranged for the Victoria aircraft.

Squadron leader Reginald Maxwell, flight lieutenants D. F. Anderson and R. Ivolaw-Chapman, and flying officers L. H. Anness and C. W. L. Trusk, received the Air Force Cross. Leading aircraftsman G. Donaldson received the Air Force Medal.

== Published accounts ==
Sir Geoffrey Salmond's account was published in 1929. In it he confirmed that by 15 February 1929, aircraft types available for the airlift of passengers and baggage, included seven Vickers Victoria aircraft, one Handley Page Hinaidi, 24 Airco DH.9As and two Westland Wapitis. The operation was accomplished in four stages. Between 18 and 22 December 1928, communications were established, as part of the first phase. The second phase focussed on evacuating women and children of the British and foreign legations. Between 2 January and 19 January 1929, the Royal family were evacuated, in the third phase. Between 20 January and 25 February 1929, the fourth phase concentrated on evacuating other foreign nationals and withdrawal of British, German, French and Italian legations.

In 1975, Sir Geoffrey Salmond's daughter, Anne Baker, published the story of the airlift in Wings over Kabul – The First Airlift.

== Historical significance ==
The Kabul Airlift is notable as the first large-scale air evacuation in history, with a total of 586 people of eleven different nationalities being rescued. Considering the limitations of aircraft at the time, operating amidst a civil war, bitter cold, and mountainous terrain, the Kabul Airlift was a remarkable feat of endurance for both the airmen and the civilians involved.

== See also ==
- 1928 in Afghanistan
- 1929 in Afghanistan
- Operation Allies Refuge - An American military operation to evacuate American and selected Afghan nationals from Afghanistan in 2021
- Operation Pitting - A British military operation to evacuate British nationals and eligible Afghans from Afghanistan in 2021
