= Salmond =

Salmond is a Scottish and English surname that is a variant of the surname Salmon. Notable people with the surname include:

- Anne Salmond (historian) (born 1945), New Zealand historian, anthropologist and writer
- Alex Salmond (1954–2024), Scottish politician, First Minister of Scotland from 2007 to 2014
- Charles Salmond (1853–1932), Scottish minister and ecclesiastical author
- Felix Salmond (1888–1952), English cellist
- James Salmond (1536–1545), Prior of Blantyre in Scotland
- George Salmond (born 1969), Scottish cricketer and football referee
- James Salmond (minister) (1898–1976), leader in the Presbyterian Church of New Zealand
- J. B. Salmond (James Bell Salmond; 1891–1985), Scottish journalist, poet and novelist
- James Louis Salmond (1868–1950), New Zealand architect
- Sir John Maitland Salmond (1881–1968), senior commander in the Royal Air Force and brother of William Geoffrey Hanson Salmond
- Sir John William Salmond, (1862–1924), legal scholar based in New Zealand
- Kathleen Salmond (1895–1946), New Zealand artist
- William Salmond (disambiguation):
  - Major-General Sir William Salmond (British Army officer) (1840–1932)
  - Sir William Geoffrey Hanson Salmond (1878–1933), senior commander in the Royal Air Force, brother of John Maitland Salmond, son of Major-General Sir William Salmond
  - William Salmond (Presbyterian minister) (1835–1917), New Zealand Presbyterian minister, university professor and writer

== See also ==
- Salmond College, formerly Salmond Hall, at the University of Otago in New Zealand
