= John Salmond (judge) =

New Zealand judge

Sir John Salmond KC
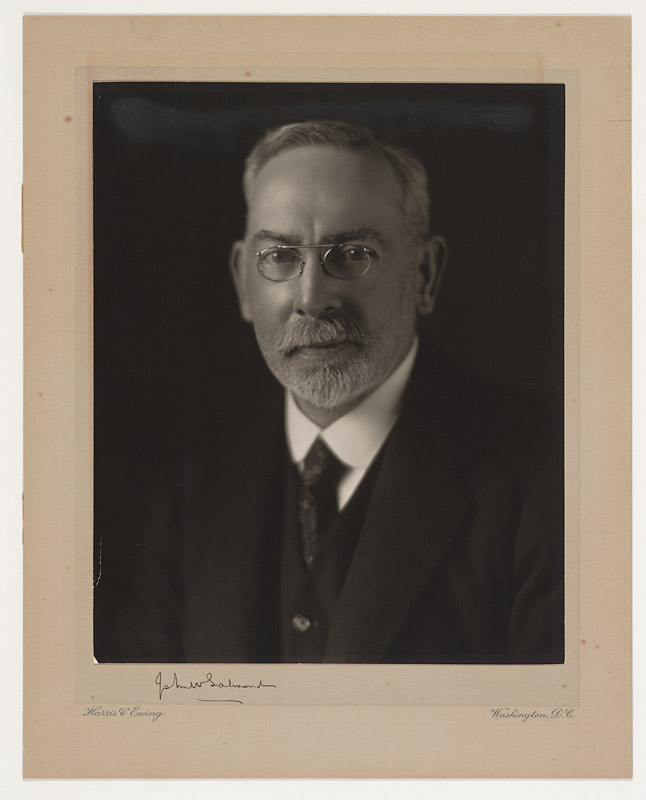
- Born: 3 December 1862; North Shields, Northumberland, England
- Died: 19 September 1924 (aged 61); Wellington, New Zealand
- Spouse: Anne Bryham Guthrie (m. 1891)
- Children: 3
- Relatives: William Salmond (father); Louis Salmond (brother); Kathleen Salmond (niece); Robin Allan (nephew); Jeremy Salmond (great-nephew)

Sir John William Salmond KC (3 December 1862 – 19 September 1924) was a legal scholar, public servant and judge in New Zealand.

== Biography ==
Salmond was born in North Shields, Northumberland, England, the eldest son of William Salmond (died 1917), a Presbyterian minister and professor. His family emigrated to Dunedin, New Zealand, in 1876 where he attended Otago Boys' High School (1876–79). Salmond graduated from the University of Otago in 1882 with a Bachelor of Arts degree and later a Master of Arts. He then obtained a Gilchrist scholarship to study at University College, London, where he graduated in law and became a fellow.

Returning to New Zealand in 1887, he was admitted as a barrister and solicitor of the Supreme Court, and practised in Temuka in South Canterbury. In 1897 he was appointed professor of law at the University of Adelaide, South Australia, and in 1906 he returned to New Zealand to take up the founding chair in law at Victoria University College, Wellington. In 1907 Salmond was appointed as Counsel to the Law Drafting Office where he remained for four years, until his appointment in 1911 as Solicitor-General. He was made a King's Counsel in 1912, knighted in 1918, and appointed a judge of the Supreme Court of New Zealand (now known as the High Court) in 1920.

Salmond represented New Zealand at the Washington Naval Conference from November 1921 to February 1922. Upon his return to New Zealand he resumed his judicial duties but died, following a heart attack, in Wellington, and was buried in Karori Cemetery.

Salmond married Anne Bryham Guthrie (c.1861–1941), daughter of James Guthrie of Newcastle upon Tyne, England, in 1891 in Dunedin. They had two sons and a daughter, of whom the eldest, Captain William Guthrie Salmond, was killed in action in France in July 1918.

== Publications ==
He was the author of several legal texts:

- Jurisprudence or the Theory of the Law (1902) (for which Salmond was awarded the Swiney Prize in 1914 by the Royal Society of Arts)
- The Law of Torts (1907) (for which Harvard University in 1911 awarded Salmond the James Barr Ames Prize for the best legal treatise published in the world over five years)
- Principles of the Law of Contracts (1927) with P. H. Winfield.

Two of these in particular, Salmond on Jurisprudence and Salmond on Torts, are regarded as legal classics.

== Legacy ==
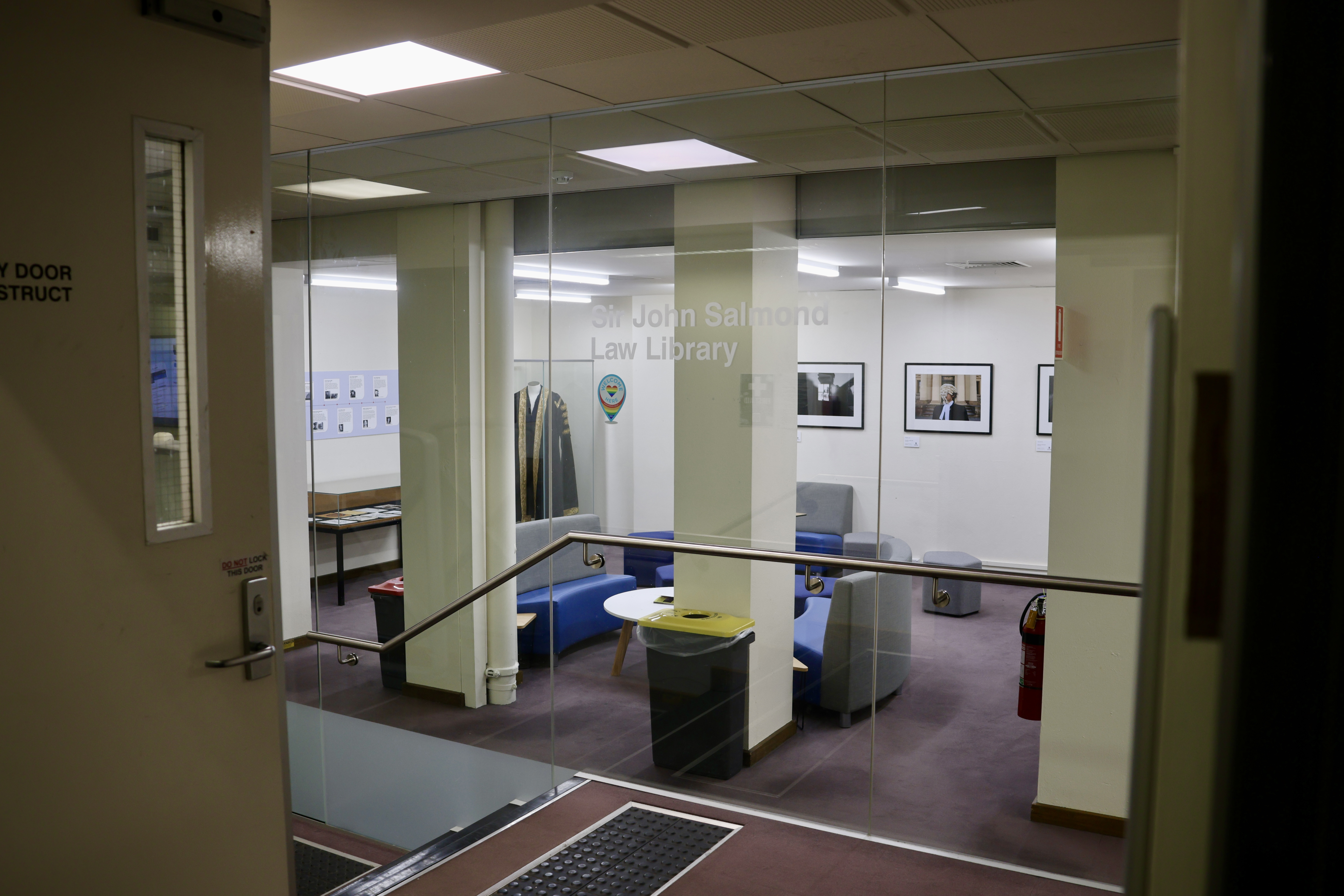
Sir John Salmond Law Library, 2025

The Law Library at the University of Adelaide Law School is named in his honor.

The function room at the Victoria University of Wellington Law School in the Old Government Buildings, Wellington is called the Salmond Room, and contains a selection of Salmond-related memorabilia.
