= Kathleen Salmond =

New Zealand artist

- Born: Kathleen Lucy Salmond; 21 August 1895; Dunedin, New Zealand
- Died: 5 May 1946 (aged 50); Dunedin, New Zealand
- Education: Dunedin Art School, Slade School of Fine Art, St Martin's School of Art
- Known for: Painting – Watercolour
- Notable work: The Sunlit Farm
- Relatives: Louis Salmond (father); John Salmond (uncle); William Salmond (grandfather); Jeremy Salmond (nephew); Robin Allan (cousin)

Kathleen Lucy Salmond (21 August 1895 – 5 May 1946) was a New Zealand artist, born in Dunedin.

== Early life and education ==
Salmond was born in Dunedin, the eldest daughter of architect Louis Salmond. She studied at the Dunedin Art School (now Otago Polytechnic). She travelled to the UK and spent a year at the Harvey-Proctor Art School in Cornwall (run by Ernest Procter and Harold Harvey), and the one year at the Slade School of Fine Art and St Martin's School of Art.

== Career ==
Salmond worked primarily with watercolour. She exhibited with:

- Auckland Society of Arts
- Canterbury Society of Arts
- New Zealand Academy of Fine Arts
- Otago Art Society
- The Group (1934)

Her work The Sunlit Farm was included in the New Zealand and South Seas Exhibition, Dunedin, 1925–6. She also exhibited works in London at the British Empire Art Exhibition and the Coronation Exhibition.

Works by Salmond are held in the collection of the Dunedin Public Art Gallery.

Salmond died in Dunedin on 5 May 1946, and she was buried at Andersons Bay Cemetery.
