= Jeremy Salmond =

New Zealand architect (1944–2023)

Jeremy Salmond QSO
- Born: Laurence Jeremy Elder Salmond; 2 January 1944; Dunedin, New Zealand
- Died: 3 January 2023 (aged 79); Auckland, New Zealand
- Education: University of Auckland
- Occupation: Conservation architect
- Spouse: Anne Salmond (m. 1971)
- Children: 3
- Relatives: Louis Salmond (grandfather); William Salmond (great-grandfather); Kathleen Salmond (aunt); John Salmond (great-uncle)
- Awards: NZIA Gold Medal (2018)
- Practice: Salmond Reed Architects

Laurence Jeremy Elder Salmond QSO (2 January 1944 – 3 January 2023) was a New Zealand conservation architect. He received the NZIA Gold Medal, the highest honour in New Zealand architecture, in 2018.

== Early life and family ==
Salmond was born in Dunedin on 2 January 1944, the son of George McCrea Salmond and Dorothy Salmond (née Smith), and grew up in Gore. After leaving school, he completed his architecture intermediate year at the University of Otago and undertook work experience at the Ministry of Works, before completing his Bachelor of Architecture degree at the University of Auckland. He later returned to the University of Auckland, earning a Master of Architecture degree in 1983. His master's thesis was titled The New Zealand house, 1800–1910.

In February 1971, Salmond married anthropologist Anne Thorpe at Holy Trinity Church, Gisborne, and the couple went on to have three children, including anthropologist Amiria Salmond.

== Career ==
From 1979 to 1983, Salmond was a senior architect at Gillespie, Newman, West and Pearce, where he worked on projects including Mount Albert Library and a retirement centre at Te Kauwhata. The completion of his master's thesis coincided with a period of sabbatical leave for his wife in England, and so he lived and worked in that country with his family for a time. After returning to New Zealand, he worked in sole practice specialising in heritage architecture from 1983 to 1986, and in 1986 his book, Old New Zealand Houses 1800–1940, based on his master's thesis, was published. As of 2023, the book was in its eight edition.

Salmond returned as a partner to Newman Pearce in 1986, the firm becoming Newman Pearce Salmond Architects, but in 1988 he returned to sole practice as Salmond Architects, based in the Auckland suburb of Devonport. In 1999, he was joined by Peter Reed, forming Salmond Reed Architects Ltd.

During his career as a conservation architect, Salmond was involved in the restoration of many of New Zealand's most important historic buildings. His first major project was the restoration of the Auckland synagogue (now University House), which received a New Zealand Institute of Architects (NZIA) national award. From 1990, he was involved as a heritage architect at Auckland War Memorial Museum, culminating in the redevelopment of the museum's south atrium, completed in 2020 (in association with Jasmax, fjmt and Design Tribe Architects), which won the Inside: Public Buildings Award at the 2022 World Architecture Festival. Other significant projects that Salmond worked on that received NZIA national awards include the restoration of Pompallier House (1995), the restoration of the Civic Theatre in Auckland (with Jasmax, 2000), and the restoration of Eichardt's Hotel in Queenstown (with Michael Wyatt Architects, 2002).

== Honours and awards ==
In 1991, Salmond was elected a Fellow of the New Zealand Institute of Architects, and in 2002 he was named a Fellow of Auckland War Memorial Museum. He was appointed a Companion of the Queen's Service Order for public services in the 2007 New Year Honours. In 2018, he was awarded the NZIA Gold Medal, the New Zealand Institute of Architecture's highest honour, and in 2021 he received a distinguished alumnus award from the University of Auckland.

== Death ==
Salmond died in Auckland on 3 January 2023, one day after his 79th birthday.

== Selected publications ==
- Salmond, Jeremy (1986). Old New Zealand houses 1800–1940. Auckland: Reed Methuen. ISBN 0474000494.
- Reynolds, Patrick; Hansen, Jeremy; Salmond, Jeremy (2009). Villa: from heritage to contemporary. Auckland: Godwit. ISBN 9781869621711.
