= William Salmond =

William Salmond may refer to:

- Sir William Salmond (British Army officer) (1840–1932), British Army general
- Sir Geoffrey Salmond (William Geoffrey Hanson Salmond, 1878–1933), British commander in the Royal Flying Corps during WWI
- William Salmond (Presbyterian minister) (1835–1917), New Zealand Presbyterian minister, university professor and writer

== See also ==
- William Salmon (disambiguation)
