= Vera Cuningham =

British artist

- Born: Vera Irene Walpole Martin Cuningham; 6 November 1897; Goffs Oak, Hertfordshire, England, United Kingdom
- Died: 3 May 1955 (aged 57); Hampstead, London, England, United Kingdom
- Education: Central School of Arts and Crafts
- Known for: Painting; Modelling

Vera Cuningham (also known as Vera Cunningham) (6 November 1897 – 3 May 1955) was a British artist. Cuningham modelled for and had relationships with fellow artists Bernard Meninsky and Matthew Smith. She lived and exhibited her works in London and Paris, where she fled with Smith at the beginning of their affair. Some of her works are in public collections in England.

== Early life and education ==
Vera Irene Walpole Martin Cuningham was born in 1897 at Goffs Oak, Hertfordshire to Scottish parents. Cuningham attended Central School of Arts and Crafts, where she studied painting. In 1922, she began exhibiting her work with The London Group and became a member of the organization in 1927.

== Early career and love interests ==
Cuningham modelled for and was in a relationship with Bernard Meninsky when she met Matthew Smith in 1922 or 1923. At the time, Smith was married to Gwen Salmond, but Cuningham and Matthew Smith left their partners and moved to Paris, where they lived at 6 bis Villa Brune. The British Museum states that they both exhibited in 1922 at the Société des Artistes Indépendants and at the Amis de Montparnasse. Smith's paintings of her between 1923 and 1926 include Vera Cuningham, Head and Shoulders, Vera Cuningham in a Chair, Vera Reclining in a Pink Slip, and Vera in a Yellow Dress, all of which are in the Corporation of London Collection. The paintings of her generally fill the canvas, emphasizing her voluptuous figure. Malcolm Yorke described her in his book as "a guffawing, red-haired, rosy-cheeked, plump-bodied, highly sexed young woman who was determined to become a professional artist." Her demeanour may have been in opposition to her family background. For instance, her mother had connections with aristocrats. She had given much of her time to modelling for Smith, but became singularly focused on her own paintings in 1925 and soon after their relationship ended.

== Career ==
In 1929, she had her first solo exhibition at the Bloomsbury Gallery. She was with Smith in Woolhope, near Hereford, in 1932. In the late 1930s, Cuningham produced several theatre designs. She participated in Colling Galleries Civil Defence Artists' shows during World War II. Exhibitions were held in 1948, 1951, and 1954 by Raymond Creuze, her Paris dealer.

She lived in Hampstead, London, and at the time of her death on 3 May 1955 she lived at Logs Cottage on Well Road. She had never married, but it has been reported that Cuningham died in the arms of Matthew Smith. A retrospective of her work was held in 1985 by the Barbican Art Gallery.

== Collections ==
- Susannah and the Elders, 1934, Pallant House Gallery, Chichester
- Woman Wearing a Large Hat, early 20th century, gouache painting, Victoria and Albert Museum
- Landscape, 1949, Victoria and Albert Museum
- Exhuberant Flower, 1954, Manchester City Galleries
- Still Life with Mackerel, City of London Corporation
- Guildhall Gallery, London
