= University of Otago Clocktower complex =

Historic buildings in the University of Otago campus, New Zealand

Coordinates: 45.86475°S 170.51499°E

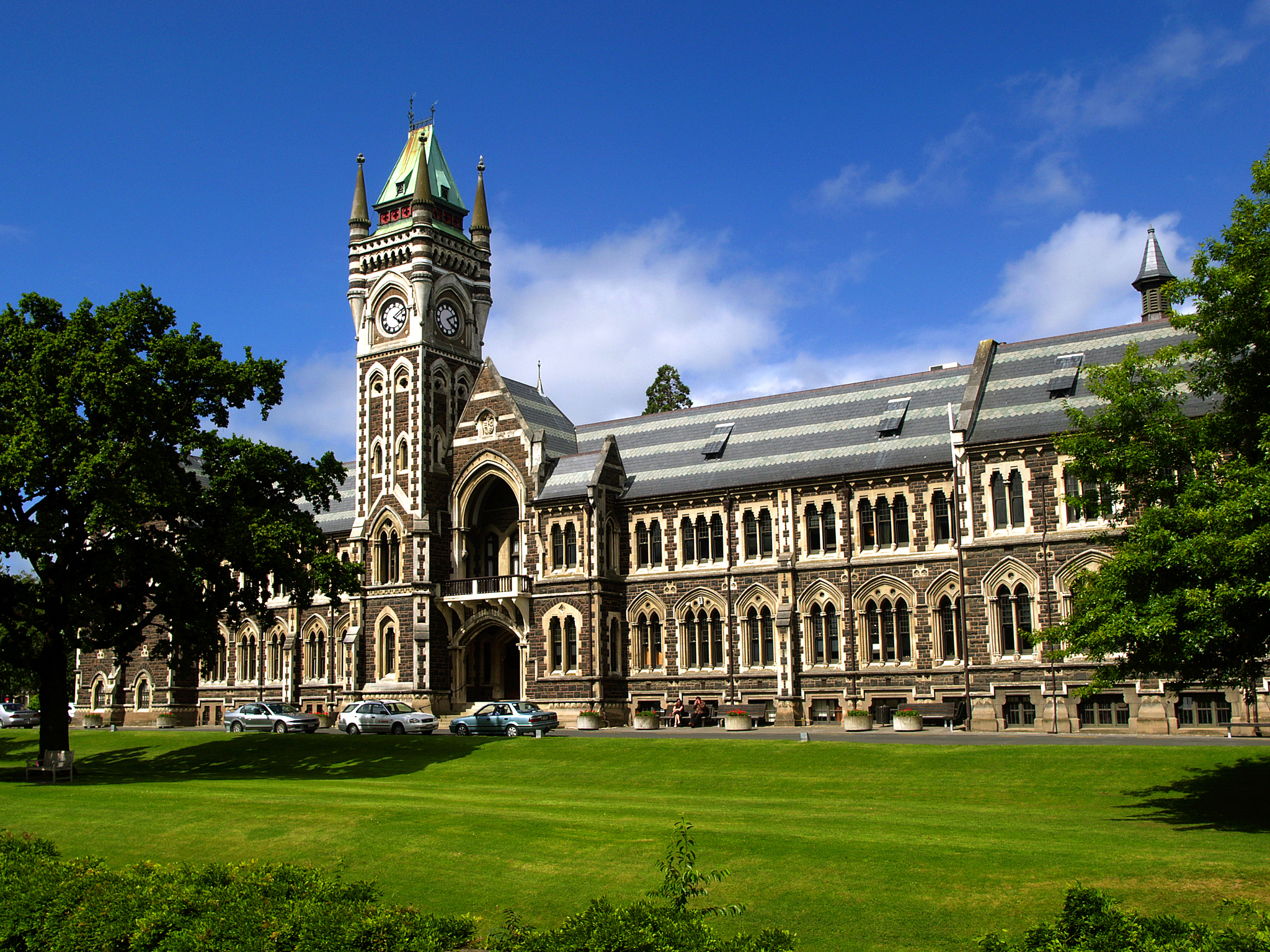
The University of Otago Registry Building, west side

Map of the Clocktower complex: 1. Registry/Clocktower building; 2. Geology Block; 3. Professorial Houses (2); 4. Staff Club; 5. Marama Hall; 6. School of Mines / Archway building; 7. Allen Hall Theatre; 8. Home Science; 9. St David Street footbridge; 10. Union Street bridge; Chequered streets are pedestrian only.

The University of Otago Clocktower complex is a group of architecturally and historically significant buildings in the centre of the University of Otago campus. Founded in Dunedin, New Zealand, in 1869, the University of Otago was the expression of the province's Scottish founders' commitment to higher education. They were also the inheritors of a strong architectural tradition and gritty determination. Defending the decision to build in expensive materials in an elaborate historicising manner, the chancellor, Donald Stuart, said "the Council had some old-world notions and liked to have a university with some architectural style". This attitude persisted for over 50 years and resulted in an impressive group of buildings.

== Building history ==
The university was originally housed in William Mason’s post office in what is now the Exchange area of the central city. It was decided the building and the location was unsuitable and the university managed to acquire the site then housing the Botanic Gardens in North Dunedin beside the Water of Leith.

This was two of the city blocks surveyed by Charles Kettle bounded by St David Street in the north, Albany Street to the south, Leith Street to the east, and Castle Street on the west side. It was bisected west to east by Union Street. The Water of Leith traversed it from the north running along its Castle Street margin though turning to flow eastward beyond the Union Street crossing. Architectural opinion of the day favored the site now occupied by Otago Boys' High School. The university authorities were under the misapprehension that the city had given up the stretch of Union Street bisecting the site.

An architectural competition was held and was won by Maxwell Bury (1825–1912). His plans to build in brick in the Classical style were changed to build in the Gothic style in stone. His conception was of two parallel ranges running north and south in the more northerly of the two city blocks. One range with a clock tower would face west across the Leith to Castle Street. (University of Otago Clocktower Building.) The other behind it, now called the Geology Block, would run close along the eastern Leith Street boundary. There would be four professorial houses in two semidetached blocks, in brick in the Queen Anne Style, immediately to the north, facing St David Street.

Construction began in 1878 and it seems the north part of the Geology Block was completed that year while the north part of the Clocktower Building and the Professorial Houses were completed in 1879. Costs to that date were 31,275 pounds. In 1883 Bury was called back to oversee a southward extension of the Geology Block. With this his work on the complex ended.

The resulting two large ranges were of bluestone with Oamaru stone facings and slate roofs on foundations of Port Chalmers breccia. A contemporary described them as “Domestic Gothic, somewhat severe” and as “a venerable pile”.

The reference to “Domestic” Gothic was perhaps inspired by the oriel window and the clock tower on the Clocktower Block but the rows of lancet windows give the structures an ecclesiastical air. They were clearly intended to evoke the ancient university buildings of England and Scotland which represent a domestic type of church architecture. The use of corbels, turrets, and undressed masonry give the buildings a specifically Scottish Baronial feeling.

It has been pointed out the tower shows the influence of Sir George Gilbert Scott’s (1811–1878) University of Glasgow completed in 1870. It does but even at this early stage there were significant differences. Scott’s building was a hilltop monument while this is a low-lying structure in a riverside setting. Bury’s surviving drawings show he intended the ranges to be extended and the Clocktower Block to have a symmetrically balanced principal western facade. In the event the whole group and this particular feature developed differently.

After a long pause, a building for the Dental School was completed on the corner of Castle and Union Streets in 1907 to the design of J.Louis Salmond (1868–1950). (It is now the Staff Club.) In 1908 the School of Mines was constructed, designed by Edmund Anscombe (1874–1948). He now conceived and carried out a different development of the whole complex.

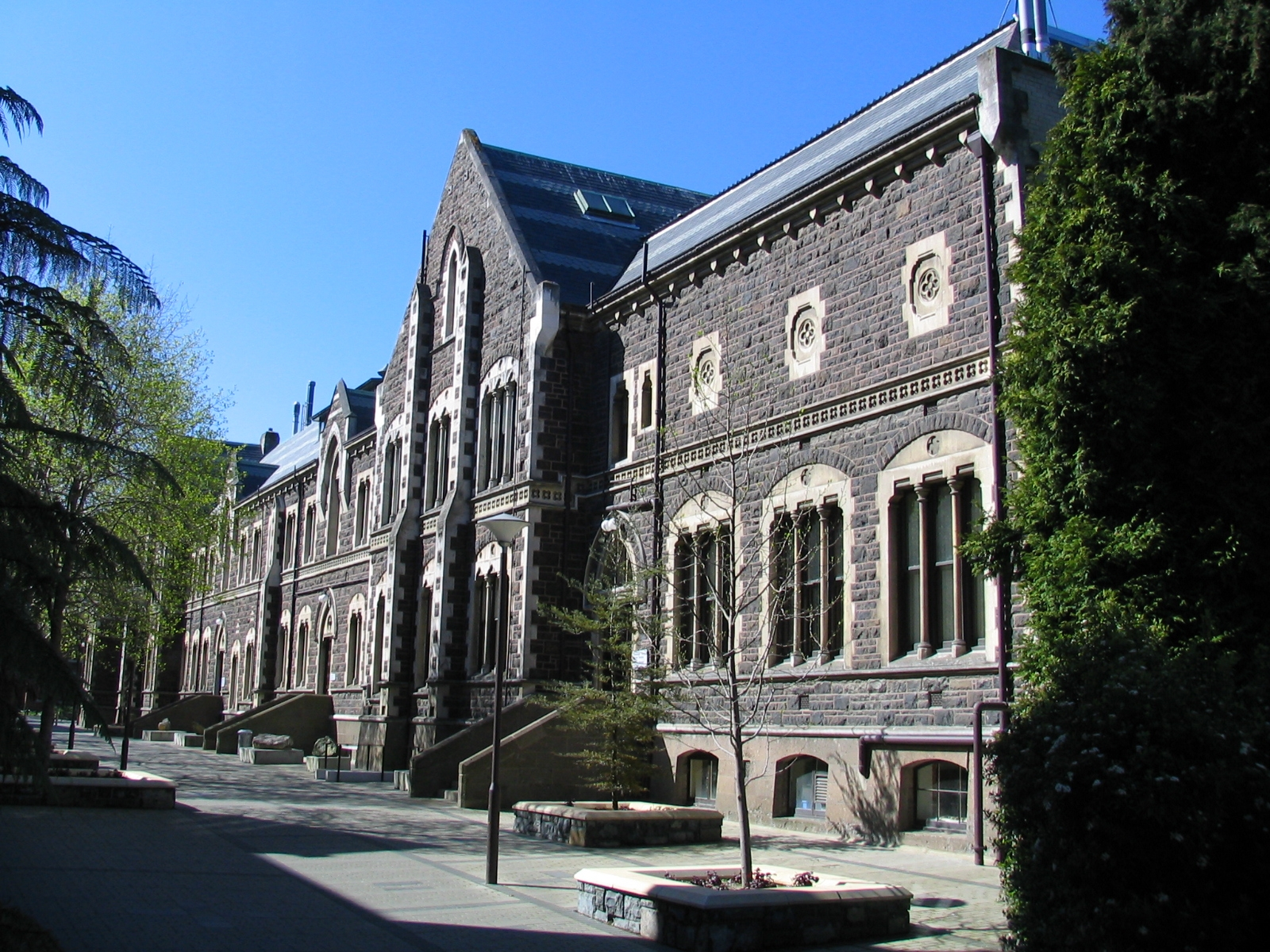
Geology Block building

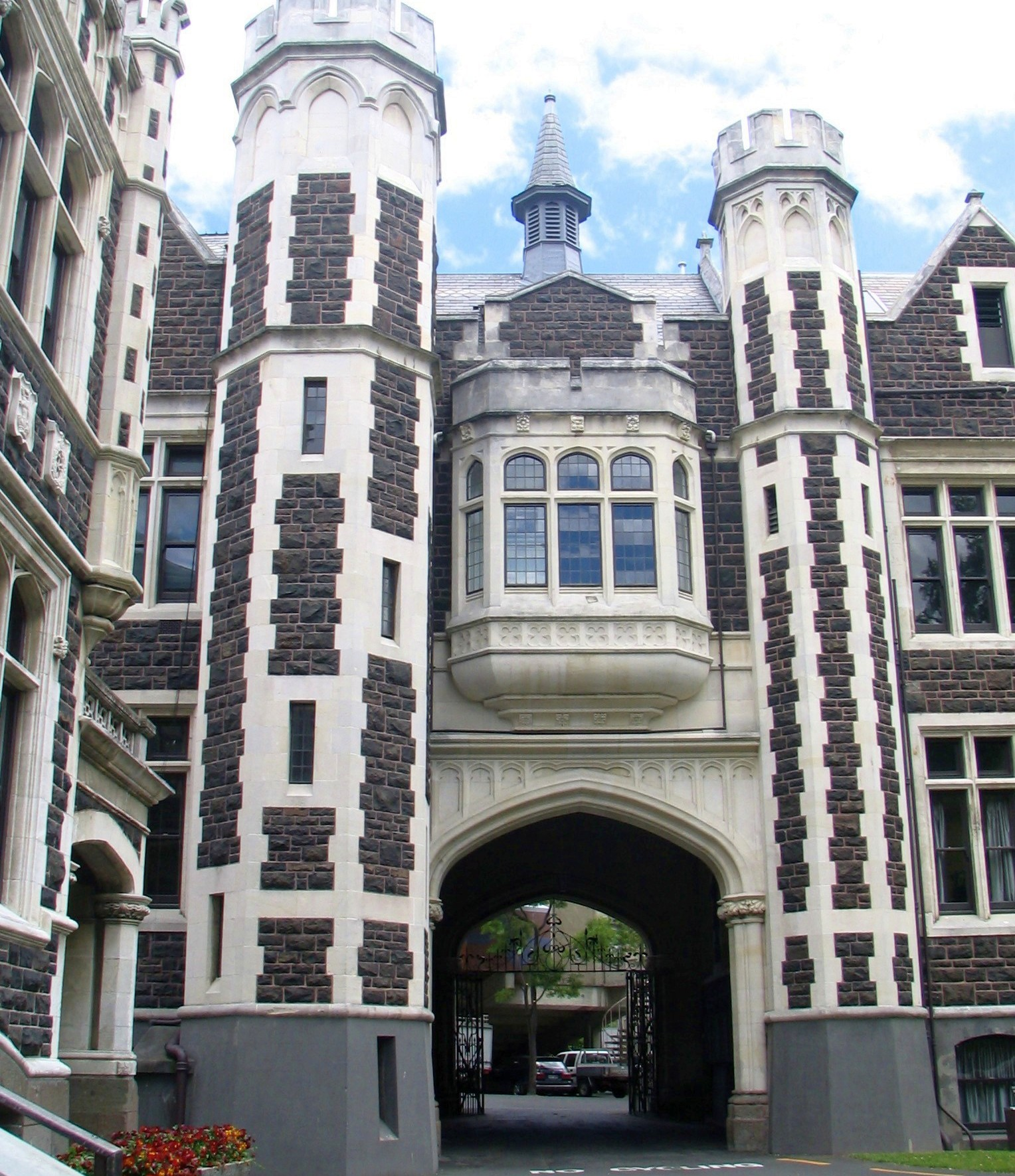
Archway Building, looking south through the arch

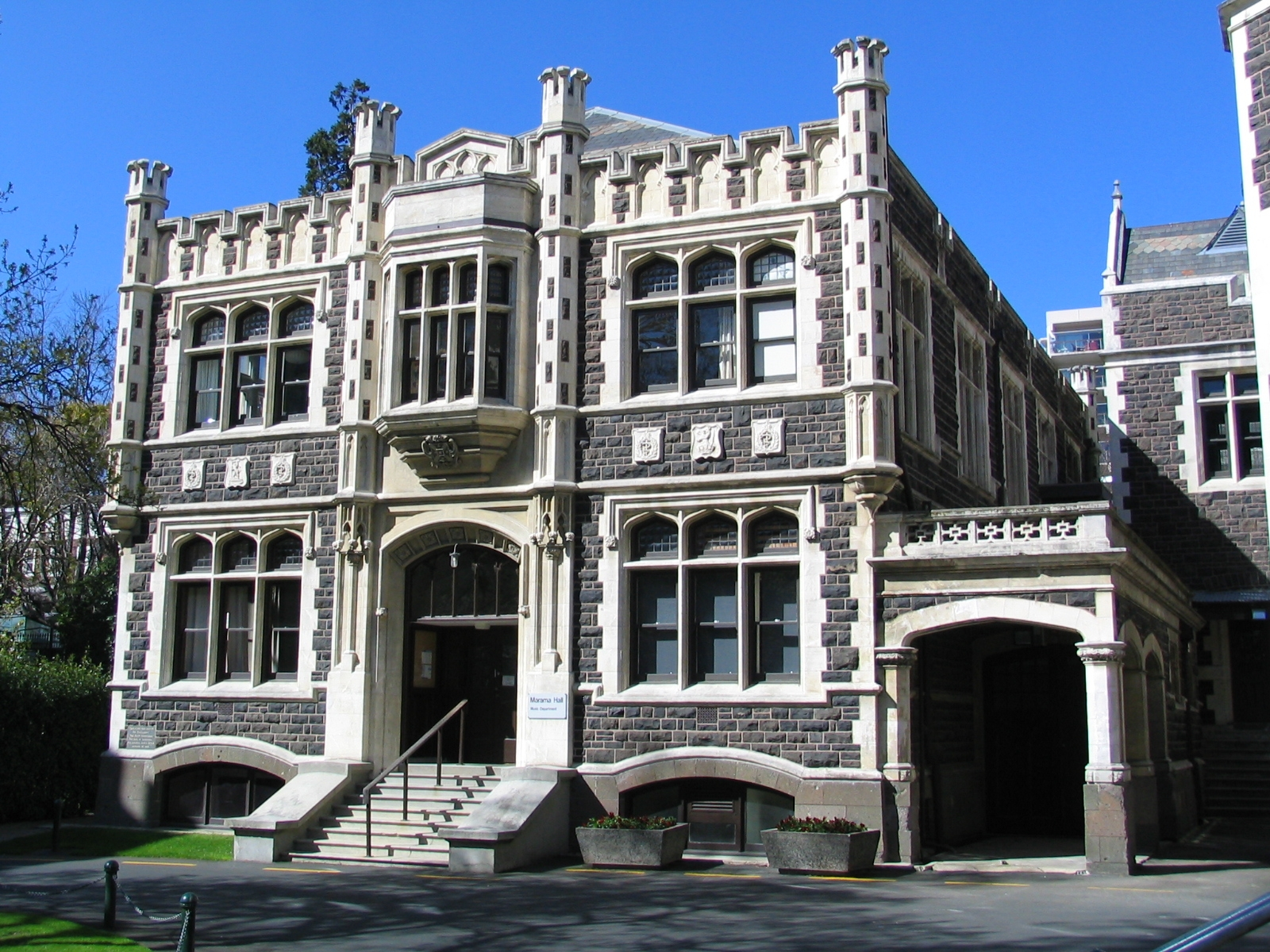
Marama Hall

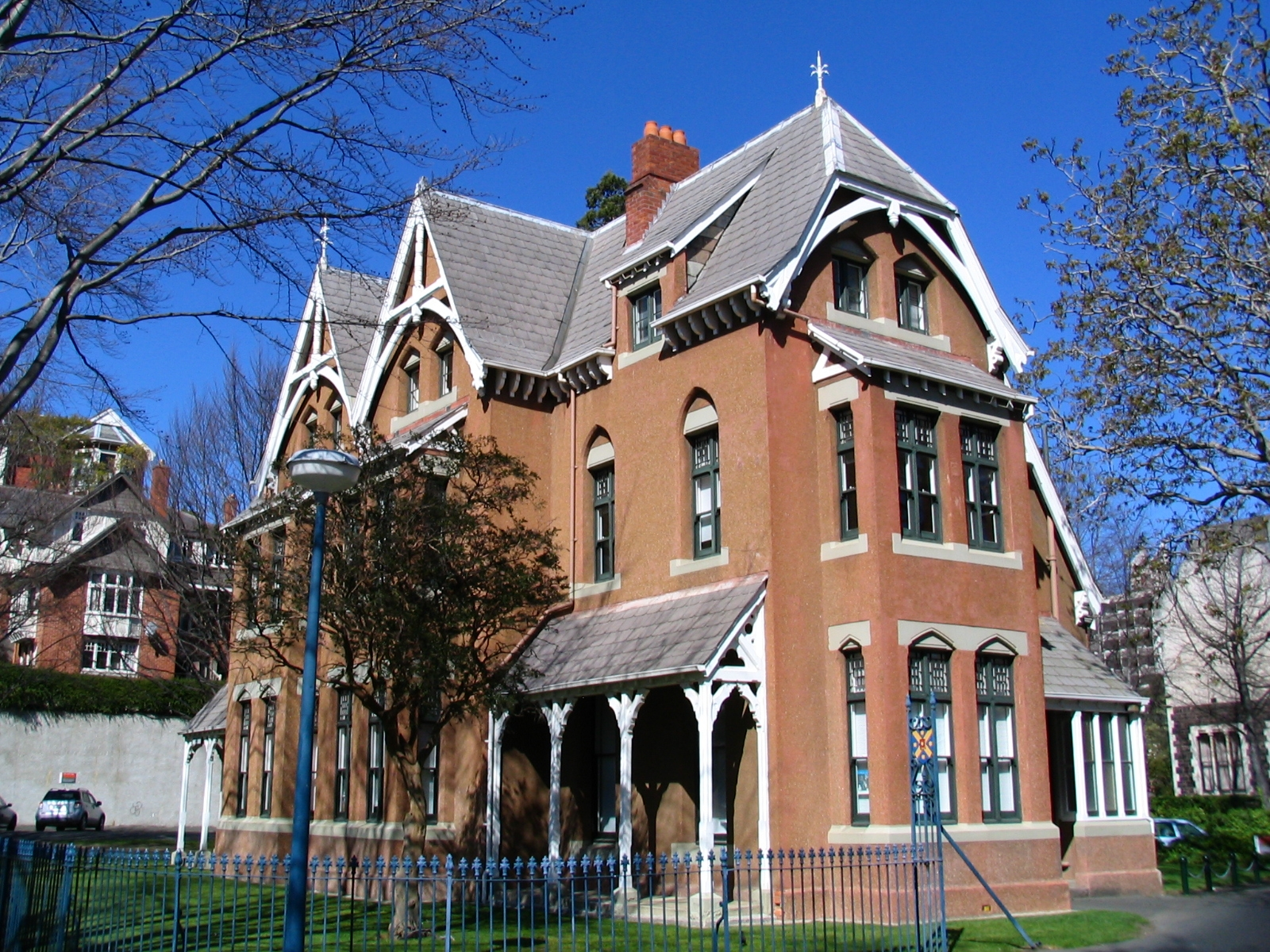
One of two identical Professorial House buildings

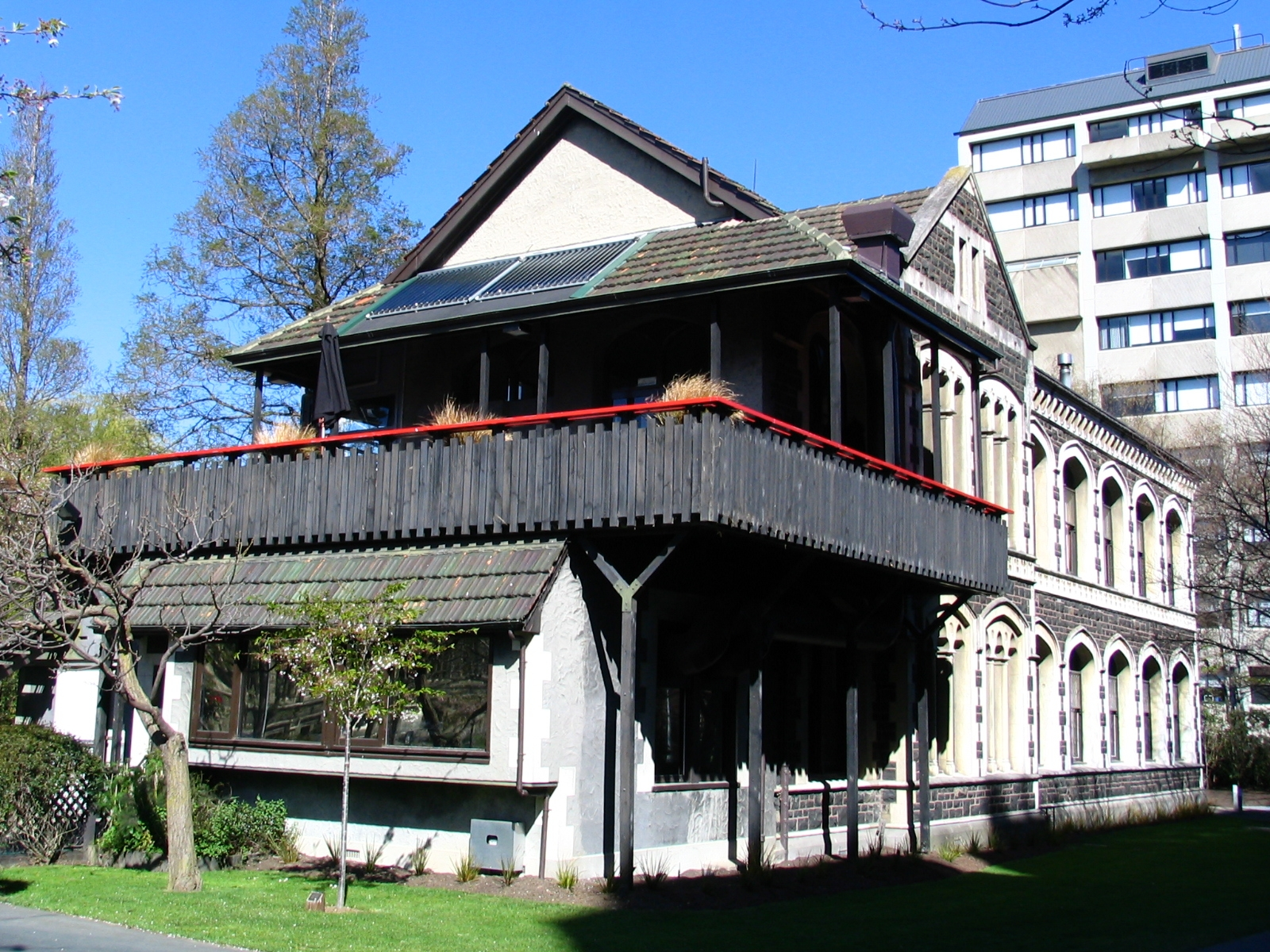
Staff Club

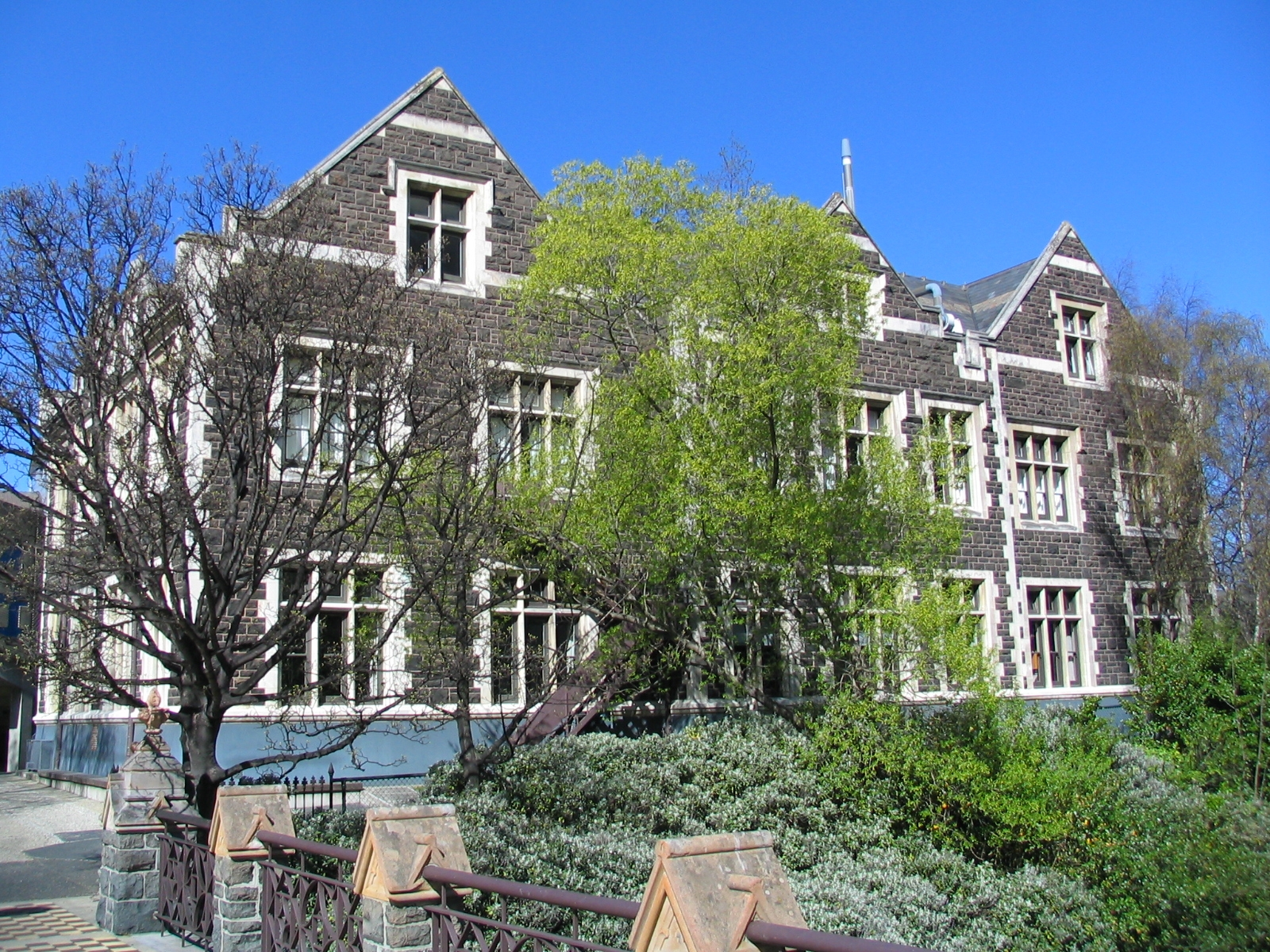
Home Science Block

In 1913 he extended the Geology Block. In 1914 he completed a southward extension of the Clocktower Block. The same year he completed the "Students’ Union": Allen Hall and another block which were linked to the School of Mines by an archway opening to Union Street. In 1920 his Home Science School was completed across Union Street to the south. The Home Science Building is a Category 1 historic place, Heritage New Zealand Pouhere Taonga (List no. 2226).

In 1922 he completed the Clocktower Block with a further southward extension. The following year his Marama Hall, between the Geology Block and Allen Hall, was opened. He also extended the Dental School. All of these structures were built in complementary bluestone with Oamaru stone facings in the now thematic Gothic style. The cost of this new burst of the building was substantially more than 30,000 pounds.

An ornamental footbridge had been put across the Leith at St David Street in 1903. Following severe flooding in 1923 and 1929 the stream was extensively channeled where it passes the Clocktower Block. After the 1929 flood, which damaged the Union Street vehicle bridge, it was repaired and furnished with ornamental bluestone and ironwork to match the buildings. It provided new access to what had become the complex's formal entrance at the Archway. The whole northerly city block was surrounded by decorative cast iron railing.

Anscombe had effectively extended Bury's two parallel ranges into a notional quadrangle with a formal entrance from the south. Across Union Street from that he started another quadrangle, its west flank formed by the Home Science Building set high on a cliff above the Leith. He also subtly recomposed the Clocktower Block with the double gables of its western façade's southernmost extremity balancing the asymmetry created by the further extension of this reach from the tower which had originally been intended as the centre of the composition. Even Anscombe's infill buildings and blind walls contrive to seem not haphazard, utilitarian interventions but manifestations of the slow, organic evolution of centuries. The unity of the whole was nicely underlined by the bridges, channeling, and railing.

The building was such that it formed an enclosed courtyard with turrets and a clock tower that could be seen from Castle Street and the Water of Leith. The courtyard is designed in Collegiate Gothic style using bluestone construction.

That the effect was appreciated is clear from the frequency with which it was photographed and otherwise reproduced from this time. (The gargoyles above the Union Street Archway entrance have been one of several favored subjects.)

The cost of building this way was increasingly high. The university had started a satellite campus in King Street. For decades the clock tower complex remained essentially unchanged.

In that time revivalist architecture fell out of fashion and by the late 1950s, it was being suggested by the Ministry of Works that the Clocktower Building should be demolished as an earthquake risk. The university council responded by reinforcing the building instead. But when it did, at last, extend the complex it placed a standard Education Department teaching block at right angles to the Home Science School, forming the southern flank of Anscombe's next intended quadrangle, but now in Modernist design. It had fascias of rusticated concrete blocks, made of bluestone aggregate mixed with coloured cement, to contextualize it. The first two floors were completed in 1961. Two more were added later. It was then named the Gregory Wing.

The university now, at last, acquired the intervening stretch of Union Street, closed it to traffic, and in 1973 paved and planted the Union Street bridge which became the Bank of New Zealand Plaza, named after its sponsor. The same year saw the completion of the Archway Lecture Theatres designed by E.J.McCoy (Ted McCoy) (b. 1925). These extended onto the Union Street carriageway and were set very close to the Anscombe Home Science Building. (This was apparently in anticipation of the latter's demolition and the demolition of the Archway Building.)

The theatre block is a Modernist structure with a cruciform plan and fair-faced concrete walls patterned with ribs to break up their surface. It contrasts with the bluestone buildings and is more dynamically designed and finished than the 1960s Home Science extension. The block also forms small, enclosed courtyards. Its layout allows vehicles to approach the complex's formal entrance, Anscombe's Archway, along the line of Union Street.

In the 1980s the university acquired and closed the stretch of Castle Street along the whole west boundary of its original property. The iron railings from St David Street to Union Street were removed. The university's architect, Colin Pilbrow, designed a new approach to the western side of the channel of the Leith.

That remained within its earlier walls, which describe an arc with its crown flattened where it grazes the flank of Castle Street, a characteristic constraining of nature within the formal grid of Kettle's street plan. But now Mr. Pilbrow allowed the echo of the full curve to be seen in a raised simulacrum of the wall's topmost coping swerving into and out of the former carriageway and providing a step from there down to the level of the channel walls with a semi-circular lawn between.

In the 1990s there was a contentious plan to build a new vehicular bridge at this point across the Leith to the Clocktower Block and then another for one further upstream which would have necessitated removing the St David Street footbridge. These plans were abandoned by a new Vice-Chancellor in the early 2000s. But consent has been granted to broaden the river channel into Castle Street and to replace the old, formally modeled, high retaining walls with more fluid, lower, Modernist ones. The future of the complex's buildings now seems fairly secure but not that of their long-established setting.

The buildings, especially the clock tower, have become a symbol of the university. The tower has been used at times in New Zealand as a signifier of academic life. The complex is the most substantial and best-realized group of Gothic revival buildings in the country. In these respects, it is comparable with the notable assembly inaugurated by Edmund Blacket’s (1817-1883) 1861 range for the University of Sydney. The complex has been the subject of artworks.

== Comparisons and Contrasts ==
As noted the complex’s main building and its tower resemble Gilbert Scott’s new building for the University of Glasgow of 1870, or at least the Glasgow structure’s principal range. Scott’s edifice was a Victorian re-interpretation of an older building, the University of Glasgow’s “Nova Erectio” (new building), two quadrangles constructed in the mid 17thC with a clock tower. Scott reproduced the two quadrangles on a larger scale. Later structures were added to this in Gothic revival style. Bury's original twin ranges for Otago were probably also intended to be developed as a quadrangle but the form this actually took was Anscombe's and is not very much like Scott's.

While Scott's building was emulated elsewhere, and revivalist buildings and complexes for universities and their colleges built in the 19thC and later are numerous, they do not represent a very specific type. For example, they do not all have clock towers or archways. Even so, these ecclesiastic-seeming collegiate groups are a recurring phenomenon and may be compared.

As also noted the clear parallel in New Zealand is the group built for Canterbury College in Christchurch, now the Christchurch Arts Centre which is more modest in scale and less picturesque in its setting. There are also some school and college groups, such as those of Christ's College in Christchurch and Selwyn College, Otago and Knox College, Otago in Dunedin and St John's College, Auckland – the latter interesting for being constructed of timber. But none of these is on the scale of the Otago complex or so architecturally ambitious. Indeed, directly comparable complexes to the Otago and Canterbury ones, intended to accommodate university institutions and aiming to emulate medieval cloisters, were never built in Auckland and Wellington, the sites of New Zealand's other two 19thC tertiary foundations. There single buildings exist, but not elaborated complexes.

In Australia, the college and other buildings developed behind Blacket's principal building for the University of Sydney form a group more extensive than Otago's, though not so self-contained. There is a smaller group around the University of Melbourne’s Old Arts Building which has a clock tower. It was designed in the Tudor Gothic style by S.C. Brittingham and built between 1919 and 1924. The University of Adelaide’s Mitchell Building is also part of a group with Elder Hall, built from 1898 to 1900, and Bonython Hall, constructed between 1919 and 1924, both in Gothic revival style, the latter designed by Woods Bagot.

More distant in time is the group centred on Winthrop Hall in Perth for the University of Western Australia which was opened in 1932, designed by Conrad Sayce in what has been called a Romanesque Revival style. And, in Brisbane, the group centred on the University of Queensland’s Forgan Smith Building, completed in 1939 but extrapolated to 1979 is another. This has been called “Art Deco” but is fundamentally a revived Romanesque. The first building was designed by Hennessy, Hennessy & Co of Sydney.

In the United States Cornell University in Ithaca, New York, has a comparable core, its McGraw Hall and Tower (McGraw Hall (Cornell University)) built from 1868 and at least partly designed by William Henry Miller. Yale University is noted for its principally Collegiate Gothic campus and has a number of such buildings, constructed of unreinforced stone, between 1917 and 1931, including Harkness Tower. These were designed by Henry Austin, Charles C. Haight and Russell Sturgis and form an imposing group.

In Canada the old part of the University of Toronto’s campus has University College’s building completed in 1858 in Gothic revival style and designed by Frederick Cumberland. There are courtyards and the buildings are mostly Romanesque and Gothic revival built between then and 1929, including Knox College, University of Toronto finished in 1915.

In Britain, apart from the grand complex of which Scott's building for Glasgow is the core there are several comparable groups to Otago's built for the Redbrick Universities (Red brick university).

The University of Manchester’s Old Quadrangle is impressive, the first part opened in 1873, another part, the Manchester Museum building, opened in 1888, and yet another, the former Christie Library, 1898, all designed by Alfred Waterhouse. It also includes Whitworth Hall built between 1895 and 1902, designed by his son Paul Waterhouse. These are all constructed of stone with red tile roofs in a matching revived the Gothic style and form a coherent whole. There is an archway and a large tower.

The University of Leeds’s Clothworkers Court was also designed by Alfred Waterhouse, in a revived Tudor Gothic style, though built-in brick and completed in 1879. It is connected to the Baines Wing started in 1882 and embraces the Great Hall designed by Cuthbert Brodrick and opened in 1894, all in a similar manner. This is another large group.

The Victoria Building, University of Liverpool was constructed in brick between 1889 and 1892 in revived Gothic style, again by Alfred Waterhouse and is backed by a quadrangle of other Gothic revival buildings. It too is impressive although its effect is not assisted by an immediately adjoining building in dissonant materials and style.

At the University of Sheffield Firth Court was completed in 1905 and a library in 1909, both designed by Edward Mitchell Gibbs (1847–1935). They are designed in the same revived Tudor Gothic style in brick and make an attractive group linked to the modernist Alfred Denny Building.

The University of Birmingham has its Chancellor's Court whose original buildings and Great Hall were designed by Aston Webb and built between 1900 and 1909. Others in a similar manner, including a clock tower built in 1908, were designed by Ingress Bell. These domed brick buildings are said to have been inspired by the Palazzo Pubblico in the Piazza del Campo in Siena and were conceived as a walled city of scholars rather than as a cloister. But they are impressive and somewhat exotic, the domes suggestive of Venice or even Istanbul.

And the University of Bristol’s Wills Memorial Building which has a Great Tower, a quadrangle and a large hall, represents a grand finale for university groups as ecclesiastic cloisters in Britain. Designed by Sir George Oatley in the Perpendicular Gothic style it was built of reinforced concrete faced with stone between 1915 and 1925, the protracted length of construction caused by the First World War, and was praised by Sir Nikolaus Pevsner for its scale, competence and conviction.

From about this time forms of classical revival architecture tended to be favored for university groups, projecting a different fiction, that of a Temple of the Muses or of an ancient Greek Academy. After the Second World War revivalism was generally displaced by modernism with the favored conception becoming that of an office block.

The Otago group is distinguished by its stone construction, its scale in the Australasian context, its setting, completeness, and relative freedom from other elements, and also by the austerity of its treatment. Its enclosed space creates a world of its own while its exterior views conjure belief in its unlikely fiction.
