= Matthew Smith (painter) =

British painter (1879–1959)

Fitzroy Street Nude No. 2. 1916. 1015×760 mm

Sir Matthew Smith, CBE (22 October 1879 – 29 September 1959) was a British painter of nudes, still-life and landscape. He studied design at the Manchester School of Art and art at the Slade School of Art. Smith studied under Henri Matisse in Paris and acquired an interest in Fauvism. During World War I, he was wounded at the Battle of Passchendaele. In 1949, Smith was appointed a Commander of the Order of the British Empire (CBE). He was knighted in 1954.

He married Gwen Salmond and their relationship broke up when he entered into an affair with Vera Cuningham. Smith lived, worked, and exhibited in England and France.

== Early life ==
Matthew Arnold Bracy Smith was born on 22 October 1879 in Halifax, West Yorkshire to Frederic and Frances Smith. His father was a wire-manufacturer and musician who invited visiting musicians to his home. Matthew went to Giggleswick School. At seventeen he went to a Bradford wool mill and a year later into the family works, where he worked for four years.

== Education ==
He studied design at the Manchester School of Art from 1901 to 1905 and painting at the Slade School of Art in London from 1905 to 1907.

In 1908, Smith went to Pont-Aven in Brittany, France. In 1911 he was in Paris where he studied under Henri Matisse at his short-lived school and was influenced by him and other Fauves. This influence can be seen in paintings such as Fitzroy Street Nude No. 1 (1916) and his series of Cornish landscapes.

He showed at Société des Artistes Indépendants in 1911.

== Personal life ==
Smith met fellow artist Gwen Salmond in 1907 in Whitby and she became his "greatest mentor". They married and had two sons together. The marriage was short and it was Salmond who raised the boys, Frederic Mark Smith and Dermott Smith, born in 1915 and 1916 respectively. Smith left his wife and sons because he felt that they were "stifling his career." Both sons served in the Royal Air Force during World War II and were killed during the war.

Smith met fellow artist Vera Cuningham in 1922 or 1923 and moved to Paris, where they lived at 6 bis Villa Brune. The British Museum states that they both exhibited in 1922 at the Société des Artistes Indépendants and at the Amis de Montparnasse. Smith and Cuningham were in Woolhope, near Hereford, in 1932. Smith's paintings of Vera between 1923 and 1926 include Vera Cuningham, Head and Shoulders, Vera Cuningham in a Chair, Vera Reclining in a Pink Slip, and Vera in a Yellow Dress, all of which are in the Corporation of London Collection. She died in 1955.

== Career ==
Smith stayed in France until the outbreak of World War I in 1914, which prevented him from returning to England, but was able later to get to Cornwall, England. He trained for the army in Hertfordshire in 1916. He was made temporary second lieutenant for the Labour Company. He was wounded in September 1917 at the Battle of Passchendaele. After having been hospitalised, he returned to active duty in 1918, was made lieutenant, and was posted at the Abbeville prisoner-of-war camp.

Between World War I and World War II he lived often in Paris and Aix-en-Provence, France. During this period he had poor mental and physical health. His work, however, reflects use of "colour in a bold, unnaturalistic manner echoing the Fauves."

In 1920 he became a member of The London Group. The family summered in Cornwall in 1920. He lived and painted landscapes in St Columb Major by the autumn of 1920. The following year he lived in Brittany, Paris and London. He then spent the winter with his family in Grez, Oise, France.

He was treated near Lake Geneva at Clinique Valmont and then by Dr. d'Espiney in Lyon, France. The following year he began a relationship with Vera Cuningham and she moved with him to his house in Paris, Villa Brune. It is said of Smith in The Obstacle Race: The Fortunes of Women Painters and Their Work:

Early in the twenties the normal shortcomings of his health allied with the sense of something unfulfilled in his personal life to produce a serious breakdown; and it was not until he found in Vera Cuningham the ideal model for his art that he recovered and, indeed redoubled his ability to work.

His first one-person show was at Tooth's Gallery, London, in 1926. He had shows at London Group, the Carnegie International Exhibition, Lefevre Gallery, and Mayor Gallery. His works were bought by Roger Fry and the Tate Gallery.

In 1944, "The Penguin Modern Painters" paperback series printed an illustrated biography written by Philip Hendy which included his works.

His work was shown at the Venice Biennale in 1938 and 1950. In 1949 he was awarded a Commander of the Most Excellent Order of the British Empire (CBE). He was knighted in 1954.

== Death ==
He died on 29 September 1959, in London.
