= Maxwell Bury =

British architect (1825-1912)

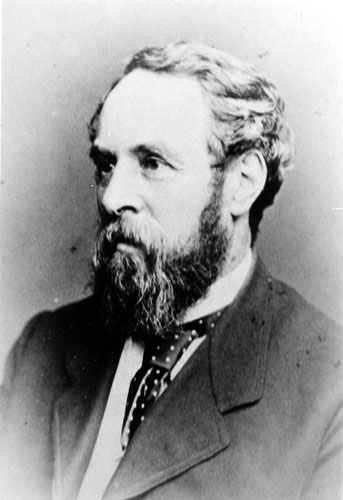
Maxwell Bury

Maxwell Bury (28 July 1825 – 9 September 1912) was an English-born architect who was active in New Zealand in the 19th century. He is best remembered for his buildings for the University of Otago.

== Life ==
Born in Nottinghamshire on 28 July 1825, Bury was the son of an Anglican clergyman and spent part of his youth in Cambridgeshire. He trained as an engineer near Derby and is thought to have been familiar with Aston Hall near Birmingham which has been seen as the inspiration of some of his New Zealand work, notably the Nelson Provincial Government Buildings. He also served as an engineer in the merchant marine.

He married Eleanor Sarah Deighton on 11 August 1853 at Ellesmere in Shropshire and in 1854 sailed with her to Australia in the Zingari a steam-assisted ship he had had a hand in building. After a brief time in Melbourne the ship and the couple arrived at Nelson in New Zealand on 12 December 1854.

Bury got a contract to provide a postal service between Nelson and Wellington using the Zingari while his wife ran a school in Nelson. He offered his services as an engineer and a land agent, played a role in public life and was involved in Nelson Anglican church affairs. No doubt this facilitated his being commissioned to design the Māori chapel at Wakapuaka. It is thought he may have been the first architect of the house begun by Bishop Edmund Hobhouse, Bishopdale. He designed the Nelson Provincial Council's principal building which was erected in 1859. In 1863 he moved with his wife and their children to Christchurch.

There he designed the Torlesse building in Cathedral Square, an orphanage at Addington and the church of St John the Baptist in Latimer Square, the latter in early 1864, as well as some private houses. He went into partnership with Benjamin Mountfort in 1864, designing St Mark's in Opawa, St James' in Cust, St Joseph's in Lyttelton, and an extension to Chippenham Lodge in St Albans with him before leaving with his family for England in March 1866. Bury returned, but when he did it seems he was alone.

He resumed his architectural career in Nelson in 1870 and in 1877 designed the Chapel of the Holy Evangelists on the hill at Bishopdale. He won the competition to design buildings for the University of Otago in Dunedin and soon moved there. He did other work in Dunedin, including commercial premises for Smith & Smith in The Octagon, but returned to Christchurch. In 1883 Bury had more work from the University of Otago and, it seems, was in Dunedin again. About the middle of 1885 he moved back to Nelson.

After 1890 he went to Sydney, returned to England in 1908 and died there at Ledbury, Herefordshire on 9 September 1912.

== Buildings ==
Time has not been kind to some of Bury's work. His Nelson Provincial Government Building was an ambitious structure for New Zealand in the 1850s. It was in the Jacobean style with an E-shaped plan like Aston Hall. It had ogee-roofed towers, bays and prominent nipped and curving gables and was made of wood decorated to resemble stone and was thus unusual as well as striking. Nevertheless, it was demolished in 1969. Some of his churches have fared better but some commercial commissions have been demolished or obscured. His domestic work has not been much explored. But in his buildings for the University of Otago Bury produced one of colonial New Zealand’s most successful groups which became the core and template for a greater complex.(University of Otago Clocktower complex, University of Otago Clocktower Building.)

Stacpoole considered Bury’s principal university building an improvement on what is usually taken to be its inspiration, Sir George Gilbert Scott’s Glasgow University, pointing to its livelier detail and better fenestration and tower. He called the main stairway "unquestionably the work of a very able designer" and said Bury’s professorial houses were "remarkably advanced for the 1870s". The first buildings of the complex remain, substantially intact, as testimony to the architect’s ability.

== Sources ==
- Knight, H. & Wales, N., Buildings of Dunedin. John McIndoe Limited, Dunedin, 1988.
- Marchant, Anne. "Bury, Maxwell 1825 - 1912". Dictionary of New Zealand Biography. Ministry for Culture and Heritage.
- O'Brien, Rebecca (2003). "Former Provincial Buildings Fire Engine House". New Zealand Historic Places Trust.
- Otago Daily Times, Dunedin 1861- [ODT].
- Stacpoole, John, Colonial Architecture in New Zealand, A.H. & A.W. Reed, Wellington, Sydney, London, 1976. ISBN 0-589-00930-3.
