= William Salmon (disambiguation) =

William Salmon (1644–1713) was an English writer on medical topics.

William Salmon may also refer to:

- William Salmon (politician) (1802–1868), lawyer, judge and politician in Upper Canada
- William Salmon (cricketer) (1846–1907), New Zealand businessman and cricketer
- William Charles Salmon (1868–1925), American politician
- William E. Salmon (died 1883), American politician from Maryland
- William Salmon (painter) (1928–2018), Australian painter

== See also ==
- Bill Sammon, American journalist
- William Salmond (disambiguation)
