= St John the Baptist Church, Christchurch =

Church in Christchurch, New Zealand

St John the Baptist Church
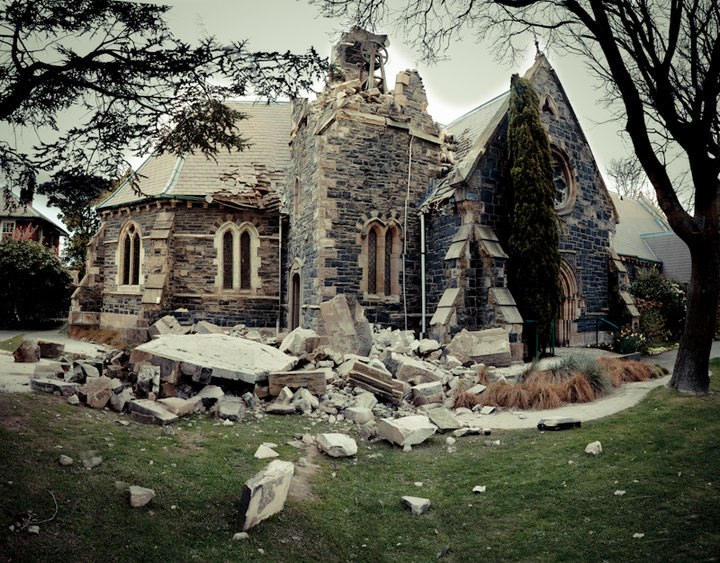
- Ruins of St John the Baptist Church, following the 2011 Christchurch earthquake
- St John the Baptist Church
- 43°31′56.1″S 172°38′34.3″E
- Address: Latimer Square, Christchurch
- Country: New Zealand
- Previous denomination: Anglican

History
- Status: Church (former)
- Founded: 24 June 1864
- Dedication: John the Baptist
- Consecrated: 27 December 1865
- Events: 2011 Christchurch earthquake

Architecture
- Functional status: Demolished
- Architects: Benjamin Mountfort; Maxwell Bury
- Architectural type: Church (former)
- Closed: February 2011

Specifications
- Materials: Stone

St John the Baptist Church is a former Anglican church that was located in Latimer Square, Christchurch, New Zealand.

Founded on 24 June 1864, the church was designed by Benjamin Mountfort and Maxwell Bury and consecrated on 27 December 1865.

The stone church was severely damaged during the 2011 Christchurch earthquake and subsequently demolished. On its section the Transitional Cathedral was constructed, made out of cardboard by the architect Shigeru Ban.

The St. John's parish offered the land for the transitional cathedral in return for use of the building and receiving it in the event of a permanent cathedral being constructed.

In 2018, most of the congregation voted to disaffiliate from Christchurch Diocese following the Anglican Church's vote to allow blessings of same-sex marriages. The congregation is now Latimer Church, part of the Church of Confessing Anglicans, and meets in Northwood.

The St. John's parish was dissolved in 2023.
