= Gwen Salmond =

English painter

Mary Gwendoline Salmond, also known as Gwen Salmond (1877–1958), was a British artist. She was the daughter of Major General William Salmond and wife of Sir Matthew Smith.

== Early life ==
Salmond was the daughter of Major General William Salmond and Lady Emma Mary H. Hoyle Salmond. She became an artist against the "strictly bourgeois plans" of her parents. Her siblings were Emma, Gladys, Geoffrey, and John.

== Education ==
Salmond studied at Slade School of Art where her friends included Gwen John and Ursula Tyrwhitt. Other students in the class of 1895, aside from Salmond and John, were Ida Nettleship and Edna Waugh.

"Being immersed in the Parisian artistic milieu the three young women were particularly drawn by the desire to participate in the creation of a new feminine artistic identity."

— Maria Tamboukou

She went to Paris in the winter of 1898–1899 with Nettleship and John to further their education. They studied at the Académie Carmen, where James Abbott McNeill Whistler taught and Salmond paid John's fees. While there, the women made paintings of each other and self-portraits. Gwen John painted Nettleship and Salmond in Interior with Figures, which has been said to be "symbolic of modern Parisian life." Brian Louis Pearce and Nettleship lived in a flat on Rue Froidveau.

Augustus John, Gwen John's brother, said that these women were the "stars of his generation."

== Marriage and children ==
Salmond met fellow artist Matthew Smith in 1907 in Whitby and she became his "greatest mentor." In 1912, she married Smith and they had two sons together, Mark (1915–1940) and Dermot (1916–1941). Their marriage was not happy; he left her permanently in 1922 but they never divorced, and he was always a strong supporter of her work. It was Salmond who raised the boys. Smith left his wife and sons because he felt they were "stifling his career."

Both sons served in the Royal Air Force during World War II and were killed during the war.

== Career ==
Her works were exhibited at Leicester Galleries, Royal Academy and the New English Art Club (NEAC).

Her considerable skills as a draughtswoman made her much in demand as a teacher of drawing. Salmond taught at the Chelsea Art School, which was managed by her friends Augustus John and William Orpen from the Slade, London County Council and Clapham Art School.
