= Anne Salmond =

New Zealand anthropologist and writer

Dame Anne Salmond ONZ DBE FRSNZ
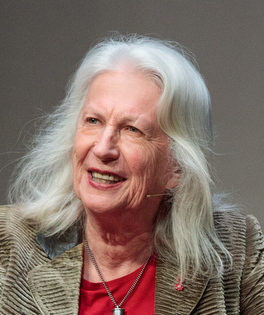
- Salmond in 2018
- Born: Mary Anne Thorpe; 16 November 1945 (age 81); Wellington, New Zealand
- Spouse: Jeremy Salmond (m. 1971; died 2023)
- Children: 3
- Relatives: James McDonald (great-grandfather)

Academic background
- Education: University of Auckland; University of Pennsylvania
- Thesis: Hui – a study of Maori ceremonial gatherings (1972)

Academic work
- Discipline: New Zealand anthropology and history
- Institutions: University of Auckland
- Website: Profile, University of Auckland webpage

Dame Mary Anne Salmond ONZ DBE FRSNZ (née Thorpe; born 16 November 1945) is a New Zealand anthropologist. She was New Zealander of the Year in 2013. In 2020, she was appointed to the Order of New Zealand, the highest honour in New Zealand's royal honours system.

== Early life and family ==
Born in Wellington in 1945, Mary Anne Thorpe was raised in Gisborne, before being sent to board at Solway College in Masterton, where she was dux in 1961. In 1962 and 1963, she attended Cleveland Heights High School in the US as an American Field Service scholar.

At the University of Auckland, Salmond graduated with Bachelor of Arts in 1966 and Master of Arts in anthropology in 1968. In the same year at Auckland Secondary Teachers' College, she received a Teaching Diploma with Distinction. Salmond later attended the University of Pennsylvania, where she gained a PhD in 1972. Her thesis was titled Hui – a study of Maori ceremonial gatherings.

Salmond was inspired to research early Māori history during her time in the United States as a teenager. When asked to talk about New Zealand, she realised she did not know much about the Māori side of the story. Her family’s links with the Māori world go back to her great-grandfather, James McDonald, a noted photographer, film-maker and artist who worked with Māori leaders, including Sir Āpirana Ngata and Sir Peter Buck.

Salmond married conservation architect Jeremy Salmond in 1971. They had three children, including anthropologist Amiria Salmond, and lived in Auckland until Jeremy's death on 3 January 2023.

== Career ==
In 2001, Salmond became Distinguished Professor of Māori Studies and Anthropology at the University of Auckland. From 2002 to 2007, Salmond served on the boards of the Foundation for Research, Science and Technology, the Museum of New Zealand, and was chair of the New Zealand Historic Places Trust. She was Pro-Vice-Chancellor (Equal Opportunity) at the University of Auckland from 1997 to 2006. She is the project sponsor for the Starpath Partnership for Excellence, which aims to ensure that Māori, Pacific and low-income students achieve their potential through education.

=== Key publications ===
Salmond had a close relationship with Eruera Stirling and Amiria Stirling, noted elders of Te Whānau-ā-Apanui and Ngāti Porou. Their collaboration led to three books about Māori life:

- Hui: A Study of Maori Ceremonial Gatherings (1975) – awarded the Elsdon Best memorial gold medal for distinction in Māori ethnology in 1976. In his review of the book, American anthropologist Thomas Fitzgerald noted: "Hui is a theoretical work, being in the tradition of emic anthropology, sociolinguistics, and the situational analysis of Erving Goffman ... [and] ... relies on these theoretical guidelines to achieve its seemingly simple, free-flowing, novel-like quality."
- Amiria: The Life of a Maori Woman – winner of a Wattie Book of the Year Award in 1977.
- Eruera: Teachings of a Maori Elder – first prize in the Wattie Book of the Year Awards in 1981.

Salmond's work then turned to cross-cultural encounters in New Zealand, resulting in two works, which, according to Encyclopædia Britannica, challenged the "common historical narrative which cast indigenous peoples as the passive subjects of colonialism...[and]...depicted the Māori as equally active participants in an event of mutual discovery".

- Two Worlds: First Meetings Between Maori and Europeans 1642–1772 (1991) – winner of the National Book Award (Non-Fiction) in 1991, and recipient of an Australian History Award, the Ernest Scott Prize, in 1992.
- Between Worlds: Early Exchanges Between Maori and Europeans 1773–1815 (1997) – winner of the Ernest Scott Prize, in 1998.

Afterwards, she began to explore early exchanges between Pacific Islanders and European explorers in the Pacific, leading to the publication of three books:

- The Trial of the Cannibal Dog: The Remarkable Story of Captain Cook’s Encounters in the South Seas (2003) – winner of the history category and the Montana Medal for Non-Fiction at the 2004 Montana New Zealand Book Awards. Published by the Yale University Press, the book focuses on how the relationships between Captain James Cook and Polynesians, which initially promised so much, became hostile, ultimately resulting in his death. The blurb concluded that Salmond's account showed the lasting impact of the collision between two different worlds.
- Aphrodite's Island: the European Discovery of Tahiti (2010). In this book, Salmond was said to have provided insight into Tahitian society in the 18th century that set the voyages of Cook and others into a context of complicated relationships with Europeans, but created a narrative of Tahitians as active participants in these interactions. Another reviewer said the book offered well-researched explanations for the clashes that often occurred due to ignorance or lack of respect by Europeans to Tahitian values and traditions.
- Bligh: William Bligh in the South Seas (2011). The New Zealand Herald in its review of the book said that Salmond challenged the commonly held portrayals of William Bligh as either brutal or the "misunderstood saint of some revisionist accounts" rather, describing him as an excellent seaman and cartographer who perceptively observed different cultures. Salmond concluded the mutiny of the Bounty may have been down to poor “people skills” by Bligh and his temper, but was more likely due to having such a small ship and insufficient officers. Another reviewer also concluded that while Salmond closely examined Bligh's conduct and how this may have brought about his downfall, there was an acknowledgement of other factors outside of his control that contributed to the mutiny.

Her book about exchanges between different realities (ontologies) Tears of Rangi: Experiments between Worlds appeared in July 2017. In a prelude to an interview with Salmond, one reviewer noted that the title referred essentially to the "grief and agony of separation", and the book analysed the role of history in creating myths and realities that needed to be reconciled in New Zealand. Salmond explained that it was about different worlds (ao) – "te ao Māori, te ao Pākehā, te ao tawhito...ways of being, ways of existing, which have assumptions about reality built into them" that can change by people being genuine, taking care of others and acknowledging their ideas as gifts.

In 2018, she presented a six-part history series Artefact, which screened on Māori Television.

Salmond wrote a five-part series in 2021 exploring possible new "institutional forms of order" for New Zealand. She made the case that acknowledging the interwoven "ancestral lines of descent" in whakapapa would allow a reimagining of relations between all people in the country, and a re-focus on the promise of the partnership between Māori and the Crown in the Treaty of Waitangi. Salmond argued that the country needed to move beyond the "binary logic" which divided the world – including how people lived and thought – into "mutually exclusive units", but with a "chain of being...[where]...the world was framed as a cosmic hierarchy" with all life forms and living systems seen as being created for human use. Salmond contended that this mind set was threatening the world and human survival requiring different systems and networks to understand how the world works, which in Aotearoa was about "experimenting with bringing together mātauranga Māori with cutting edge science...[and people]...seeking to free their thinking from disciplinary silos by focusing on relations among and between different living systems and life forms".

In 2023 Salmond published Knowledge is a Blessing on Your Mind: Selected Writings, 1980–2020, a collection of her writings that traced her "journey as an anthropologist, as a writer and activist, as a Pākehā New Zealander, as a friend, wife and mother". Reviewing the collection, Alison Jones said it was not possible to "overstate the social and political value of [the] book", suggesting that the key message in the work was that people in New Zealand can live and stand together in "the context of two worlds...[by sensing and appreciating]...the entanglements of [both] worlds, including tensions and differences". Salmond acknowledged that the idea for the collection came from her husband, who had also felt that the contemporary, personalised introductions to each piece would add context about "what was happening at the time".

== Public policy positions ==
Based on her research and writing, Salmond has frequently commented about cultural interactions in New Zealand. In the Otago Daily Times, in 2019 she stated: "White supremacy is a black strand woven through our history as a nation", but that at the time of early arrivals to New Zealand there were "ideas of justice and kindness, equality and mutual respect". She later re-examined the narrative around the landing of Captain Cook in New Zealand in October 1769 and noted that while there were clearly casualties inflicted on local Māori that could have been avoided, there was evidence that Cook was not a "white supremacist, contemptuous of Māori and willing to kill them at random". This conclusion was challenged by academics who said that her approach had been too "frugal with the concept of white supremacy", rather than using it as an analytical framework for "understanding colonialism...and the part that individuals play in perpetuating that system". Salmond responded and disputed the doctrine of discovery was uncontested at the time and that prior to leaving, conflicting instructions were given to Cook. One set said he was to show respect to the "Natives of several lands where the ship may touch...[and]...no European Nation has a right to occupy any part of their country or settle among them without their voluntary consent", and another which said he was to be civil to peoples he encountered, but, "with the consent of the natives, to take possession of convenient situations in the country in the name of the King of Great Britain". Salmond noted that in his journal, Cook admitted to an "error of judgement".

In December 2020 Salmond expressed optimism that a worldview for New Zealand based on key concepts such as aroha (‘love’) and kaitiakitanga (‘guardianship’) could build relationships, not just between people, but also with the living world. In 2020, when the New Zealand media outlet Stuff apologised for its inequitable treatment of Māori and tikanga Māori, Salmond made the case that under the Treaty of Waitangi, this was "living up to the Queen's promise of equality and mutual respect for different tikanga, and weaving these together in ways that benefit all New Zealanders".

Seeking to build understandings of different cultural beliefs about the relationship between people, land, rivers and the ocean, Salmond speaks and writes widely on environmental challenges. She was elected Deputy Chair of the Parks and Wilderness Trust in 1990, and in 2000, with her husband Jeremy, initiated the restoration of what would become the Waikereru Ecosanctuary near Gisborne. She has been involved in a number of environmental organisations and is the 'Patron of Te Awaroa: 1000 Rivers', a project that aims to "restore 1000 [New Zealand] rivers by 2050." When there were discussions in New Zealand in 2017 about "royalties for the commercial use of freshwater", Salmond held this need not undermine the generally accepted maxim that 'everyone owns the water', but instead acknowledge that "iwi have special relationships with ancestral waterways" which have been recognised in legislation following settlements under the Treaty of Waitangi. In making the case for the New Zealand Government taking a trustee role in protecting waterways, Salmond cited initiatives in Hawaii and the USA that recognised the public interest could be maintained when customary rights were respected and that there was "a uniquely Kiwi way" of doing this based on kaitiakitanga (‘guardianship’). She concluded that those who made private profit from using the waterways should "contribute to their preservation and enhancement...[because]...rivers, lakes, springs and aquifers are the lifeblood of the land. We pollute and destroy them at our own peril". An article co-authored by Salmond in 2019, said that protecting waterways in New Zealand involved "[exploring] deep underlying assumptions about relationships between people and the planet, and how these translate into very different ways of relating to waterways in Aotearoa New Zealand".

Salmond called for "nature based solutions" to tackle climate change in New Zealand if the country's indigenous forests that supported important diversity of plants and animals and store high amounts of carbon were to be restored. She noted however, that this was at variance with the current approach that "incentivises the mass planting of monocultural exotic tree plantations", often resulting in plantations of pines on steep land that was susceptible to erosion with adverse effects on topsoils allowing "sediment and slash [to] choke waterways...and wreck estuaries and harbours". In the same piece, Salmond suggested that the New Zealand Government "should be listening to ecologists and modellers who understand the complex links between climate, forests, waterways and other ecosystems, and weighing the impacts on local communities and economies in their decision-making", and not be driven by the Emissions Trading Scheme (ETS) which privileged a forestry industry that was "largely owned overseas". On 17 July 2023, Salmond questioned how effective the ETS was in reducing global emissions and claimed that it actually "[emitted] about twice as much carbon as it sequesters." In developing her position that the ETS was in need of a "major overhaul", Salmond claimed that while the system did benefit forestry, the industry could be seen as greenwashing, and there was a risk that the New Zealand ETS process could be accused of the same. Salmond noted how "pine plantations had been displacing other land uses, including food production through sheep and beef farming, while increasing the risks of fire, disease, wildling pines, erosion with clear fell harvesting, and flooding with forestry slash", and this was evident in the devastation caused to the environment and communities by forestry debris during Cyclone Gabrielle.

As New Zealand prepared for a general election in 2023, Salmond questioned whether either Chris Hipkins or Christopher Luxon as leaders of the two main political parties in the country were being "honest and long-sighted, or cynical or expedient...[in developing policies]...to address climate change at pace and scale".

== Honours and awards ==
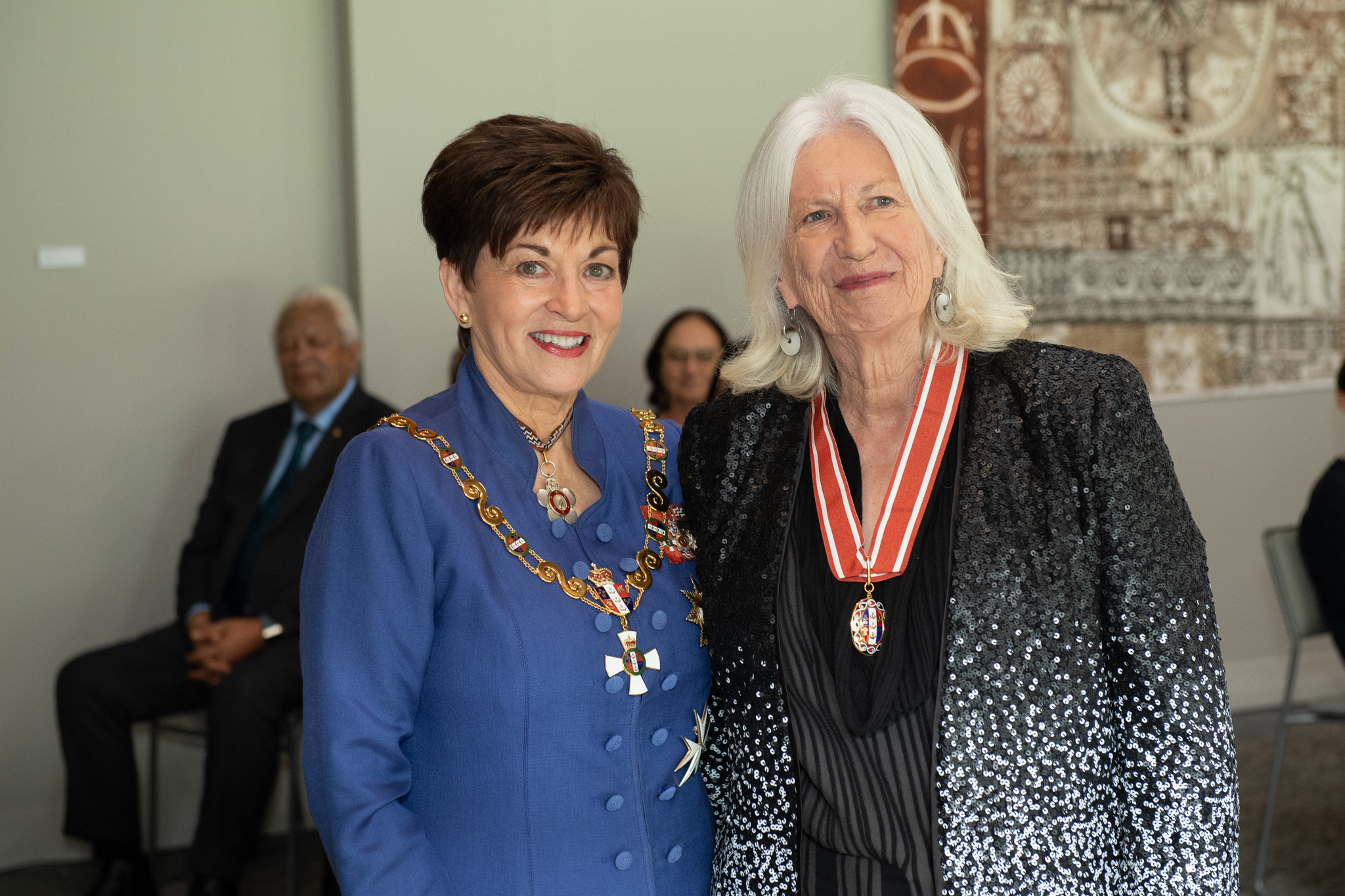
Salmond (right), after her investiture as a Member of the Order of New Zealand by the governor-general, Dame Patsy Reddy, at Government House, Auckland, on 19 April 2021

In the 1988 Queen's Birthday Honours, Salmond was appointed a Commander of the Order of the British Empire, for services to literature and the Māori people, In the 1995 New Year Honours, she was promoted to Dame Commander of the Order of the British Empire, for services to historical research.

Salmond received the Prime Minister's Award for Literary Achievement for non-fiction in 2004.

In November 2007, she was elected as an inaugural Fellow of the New Zealand Academy for the Humanities.

Salmond was elected a Corresponding Fellow of the British Academy In 2008, and in 2009, a Foreign Associate of the National Academy of Sciences – the first New Zealander known to have achieved this double distinction.

In 2013, the Royal Society of New Zealand awarded her the Rutherford Medal. She was also named New Zealander of the Year for her work on cultural history.

She was elected an international member of the American Philosophical Society in 2015.

In 2017, Salmond was selected as one of the Royal Society Te Apārangi's "150 women in 150 words", celebrating the contributions of women to knowledge in New Zealand.

In 2018, she was awarded a Carl Friedrich von Siemens Research Award, Alexander von Humboldt Foundation, Germany, in recognition of lifetime achievements in research; and was a finalist for the Al-Rodhan prize for Global Cultural Understanding, British Academy, for Tears of Rangi.

During the annual Blake Awards ceremony in Auckland in 2020, Salmond received the Blake medal in recognition of her work to build intercultural understanding between Māori and Pākehā. James Gibson, CEO said that "Dame Anne Salmond is one of New Zealand's most outstanding leaders and trail-blazers...[and]...her life-long study of Māori culture, and her efforts to improve intercultural understanding between Māori and Pākehā has improved New Zealanders' understanding of their own history". In the 2021 New Year Honours, Salmond was appointed to the Order of New Zealand for services to New Zealand.

Salmond was the 2024 Honoured Writer at the Auckland Writers Festival.
