= Charles Salmond =

Scottish minister of the Free Church of Scotland

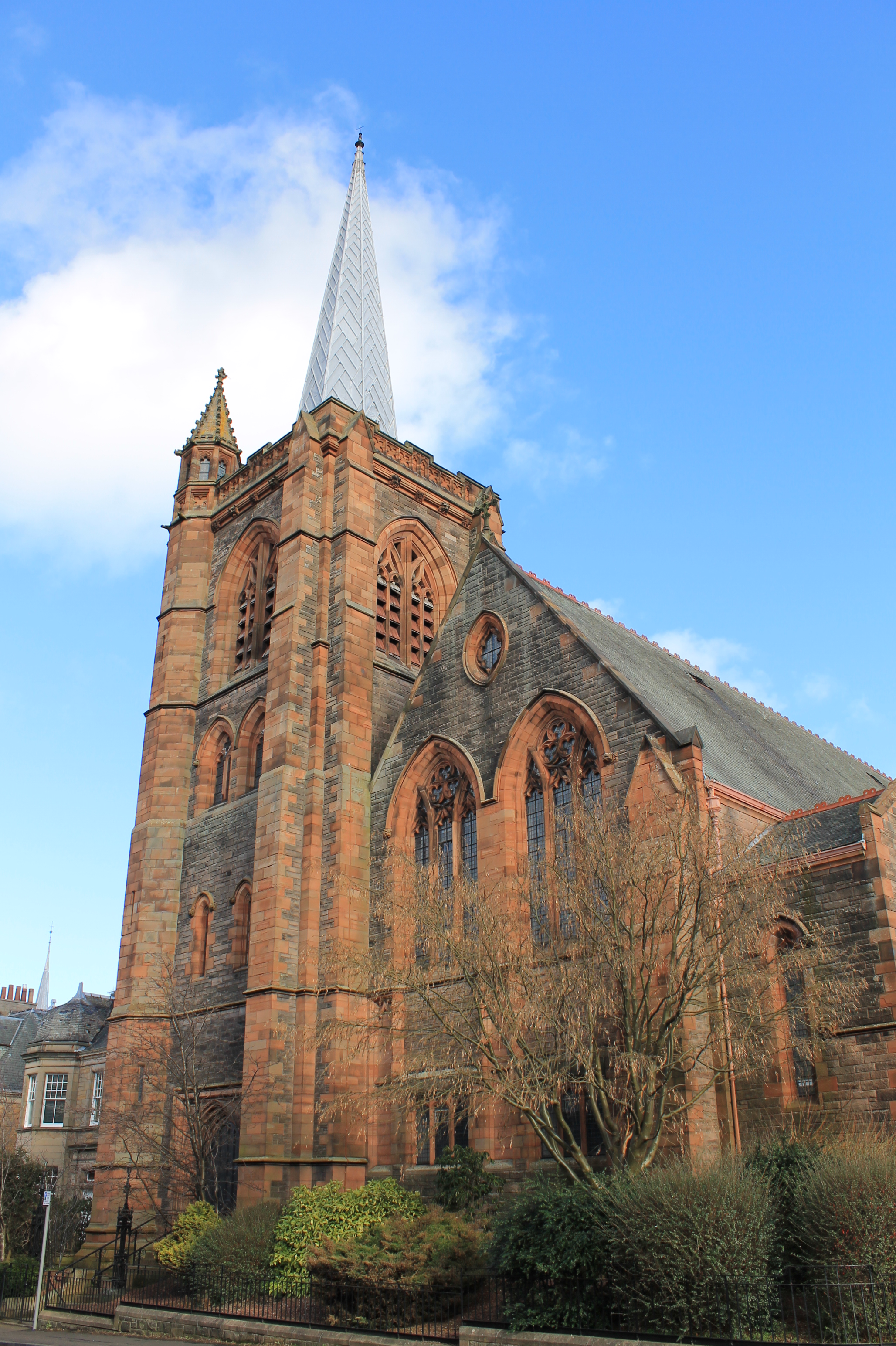
South Morningside Free Church, Braid Road

Charles Adamson Salmond (1853–1932) was a Scottish minister of the Free Church of Scotland and ecclesiastical author.

== Life ==
He was born in Arbroath. He studied divinity at the University of Edinburghthen trained as a Free Church minister at New College, Edinburgh. He did a postgraduate year at Princeton University in America.

He was ordained at the Free Church in Cults, Aberdeen in 1879. He was translated to St Matthew's Free church in Glasgow in 1881. He was then living at 4 Royal Crescent (West). In 1887 he translated to the West Free Church in Rothesay and finally in 1890 he settled at the newly built South Morningside Free Church on Braid Road in Edinburgh. Salmond was the first minister of this spectacular church, designed by Sir Robert Rowand Anderson.

In Edinburgh he lived very close to the church at 9 Cluny Drive.

In 1900 he and his church joined the Union in creating the United Free Church of Scotland, usually just referred to as the UF Church. In the same year he visited Princeton University again.

He is buried in the Western Cemetery in Arbroath.

== Family ==
In 1883 he was married to Margaret Hamersly Johnston (1862-1908).

== Publications ==
- Vaticanism: An Exposition and Defence of Prince Bismarck's Anti-Ultramontane Policy (1876)
- A Woman's Work: Memorials of Eliza Fletcher (1884)
- Princetoniana: A Table Talk with Hodge the Younger (1888)
- J A Wylie as I Knew Him (1890)
- For Days of Youth (1896)
- The Religious Question in France (1905)
- The Protestant Institute of Scotland (1911)
- The Romanising Movement in the Church of England (1917)
- Pilgrims Towards Plymouth
- Perfectionism: The False and the True
- Sermonettes for the Young
