= Robin Allan =

New Zealand geologist and university professor (1900–1966)

Robin Sutcliffe Allan (7 September 1900 – 5 July 1966) was a New Zealand geologist and university professor. The university professor William Salmond was his grandfather.

Allan was the geologist on the 1924 Chatham Islands Expedition.

In 1953, Allan was awarded the Queen Elizabeth II Coronation Medal. The Allan Hills in Antarctica, mapped by the New Zealand party (1957–58) of the Commonwealth Trans-Antarctic Expedition, were named in his honour.
