= William Salmond (British Army officer) =

Major-General Sir William Salmond KCB
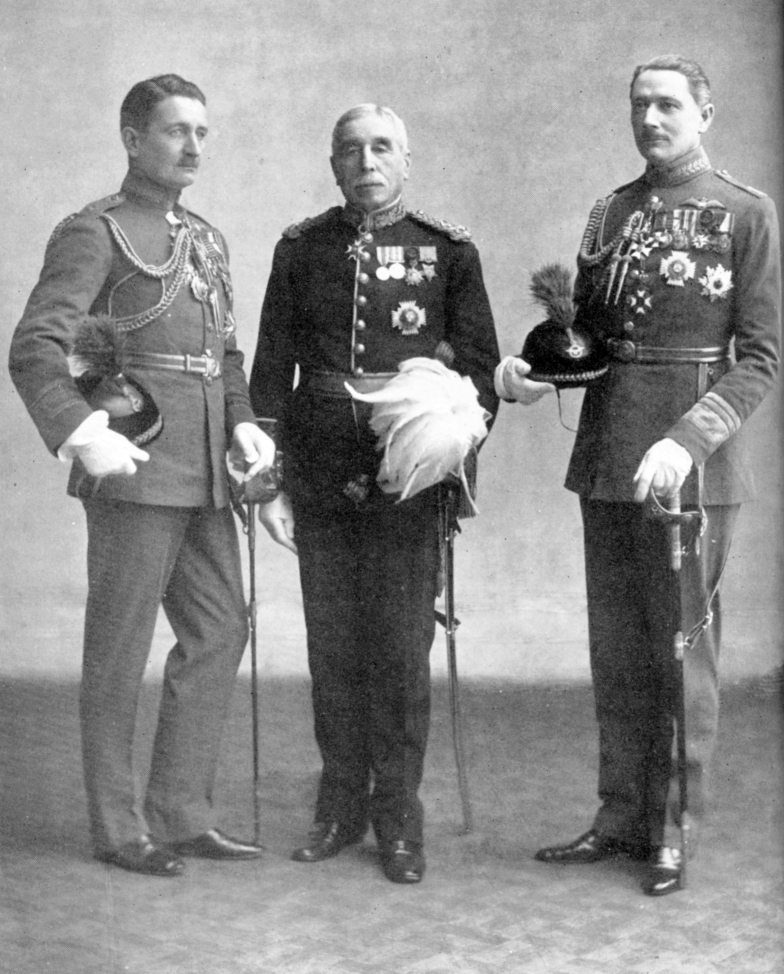
- Sir William Salmond (centre) with his sons
- Born: 25 August 1840; York, England
- Died: 8 November 1932 (aged 92); Bruton, Somerset, England
- Relatives: Gwen Salmond (daughter); Sir Geoffrey Salmond (son); Sir John Salmond (son)
- Military career
- Allegiance: United Kingdom
- Branch: British Army
- Service years: 1857–1902
- Rank: Major-General
- Conflicts: Anglo-Egyptian War; Second Boer War
- Awards: Knight Commander of the Order of the Bath; Mentioned in Despatches

Major-General Sir William Salmond, KCB (25 August 1840 – 8 November 1932) was a British Army officer.

== Military career ==
Grandson of Major General James Hanson Salmond, Military Secretary to the East India Company and author of The Mysore War, William Salmond was born the son of Lieutenant Colonel James Salmond (1805–1880) and Emma Isabella Coke (d. 1886), daughter of D'Ewes Coke (1774–1856) and Harriet Wright. He studied at the Royal Military Academy, Woolwich, and was commissioned into the Royal Engineers in October 1857.

Salmond was appointed an Instructor in Musketry in November 1872 and took part in the Anglo-Egyptian War in 1882, during which he was mentioned in despatches. He became Assistant Director of Works (Barracks) at the War Office in April 1883, Assistant Adjutant-General for the Royal Engineers in October 1884 and Assistant Quartermaster-General in April 1886. He went on to be Commander, Royal Engineers for the Home District in July 1890, Deputy Inspector-General of Fortifications at the War Office in May 1891 and finally Deputy Adjutant-General for the Royal Engineers in 1896. He continued in this role during the Second Boer War and stepped down as it ended in June 1902, retiring from the army on 25 August. In the October 1902 South African Honours list, he was promoted to a Knight Commander of the Order of the Bath (KCB), and he was invested with the insignia of the order by King Edward VII at Buckingham Palace on 18 December 1902.

Salmond died at his home at Whaddon House near Bruton in Somerset on 8 November 1932.

== Family ==
In 1874 Salmond married Emma Mary Hoyle; they had two sons, Geoffrey and John, and a daughter, Maizie. His daughter Mary Gwendoline was an artist.
