= Louis Salmond =

New Zealand architect (1868–1950)

James Louis Salmond (1868 – 12 March 1950) was a New Zealand architect active in the late 19th and early 20th centuries. Many of his buildings remain, particularly in Otago. He established a practice carried on by his son and grandson into the 21st century.

== Life ==
Born in North Shields in 1868 the son of the Reverend Dr William Salmond he emigrated as a child with his family when his father was appointed the first Professor of Theology at the Theological Hall in Dunedin. He attended Otago Boys' High School and was articled to R.A. Lawson. Through that association he met the artist George O'Brien in 1888 and left an impression of him. He went into practice on his own account but later formed a partnership with Lawson when the latter returned to Dunedin in 1900. The practice later became Salmond and Vanes.

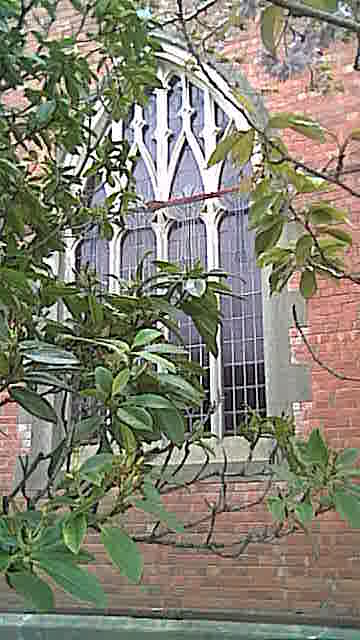
West window. Waikouaiti Presbyterian Church. Built 1914.

Salmond designed more than twenty churches in Otago including the Presbyterian churches at Roslyn, Kaikorai and Waikouaiti. He also designed the terrace houses on upper Stuart Street and Moray Place in Dunedin, the Bristol Piano Company building and the Queen's Buildings, both on Princes Street and the first Dental School building for the University of Otago (now part of its Clocktower complex). He was also responsible for work on Knox College and designed the Grand Pacific Hotel in Suva, Fiji. There were also many domestic commissions.

Salmond's work is sober and solid. He used several of the revived styles current at the time, including the Gothic, the Classical and the Baroque, the latter in the Bristol Piano Company building. What his buildings lack in flamboyance they make up in good proportions, sound construction and dignity. Salmond's son Arthur Louis Salmond (1906–1994) went into partnership with him. James Louis Salmond died in Dunedin in 1950, and was buried in Andersons Bay Cemetery. A number of his close relations had distinguished careers, some in Law and Theology. His grandson Arthur John Salmond (1940–2008) carried on the practice until 2008. Another grandson is Auckland conservation architect Jeremy Salmond.

Salmond's work is included in the Salmond Anderson Architects Records, a UNESCO New Zealand Memory of the World archive held at the Hocken Collections.

== Sources ==
- Entwisle, Peter, William Mathew Hodgkins & his Circle, Dunedin Public Art Gallery, Dunedin, 1984.
- Knight, Hardwicke & Wales, Niel, Buildings of Dunedin, John McIndoe Limited, Dunedin, 1988.
- Otago Daily Times, Dunedin, 1861-.
- Salmond, AJ, Knox College Conservation Plan 2004, Salmond Anderson Ltd, Dunedin, 2003, pp. 13–14.
