= William Salmond (Presbyterian minister) =

New Zealand minister, university professor

William Salmond (9 February 1835 – 6 March 1917) was a notable New Zealand presbyterian minister, university professor and writer. He was born in Edinburgh, Midlothian, Scotland in 1835. The geologist Robin Allan was his grandson. Salmond taught theology at the University of Otago.
