= Hugh Fraser =

Hugh Fraser may refer to:

== Entertainment ==
- Hugh Fraser (actor) (born 1945), contemporary English actor
- Hugh Fraser (musician) (born 1958), Canadian jazz trombonist and composer
- Hugh Fraser, founder of Fraser's Magazine with William Maginn

== Politics ==
- Hugh Fraser (Australian politician) (1837–1900), politician in the Colony of South Australia
- Hugh Fraser (diplomat) (1837–1894), British diplomat to Japan
- Hugh Fraser (colonial administrator) (1891–1944), British colonial administrator
- Hugh Fraser (British politician) (1918–1984), British Conservative politician
- Hugh Fraser, 1st Baron Fraser of Allander (1903–1966), British peer and former chairman of House of Fraser
- Hugh Fraser, 1st Lord Lovat, Scottish peer
- Hugh Fraser, 3rd Lord Lovat (1494–1544), Scottish peer
- Hugh Fraser, 5th Lord Lovat, Scottish peer
- Hugh Fraser, 7th Lord Lovat (1591–1645), Scottish landowner.
- Hugh Fraser, 9th Lord Lovat (1649–1672), hereditary chief of the Clan Fraser
- Sir Hugh Fraser, 2nd Baronet (1936–1987), chairman of House of Fraser

== Other ==
- Hugh Fraser (athlete) (born 1952), Canadian Olympic sprinter and judge
- Hugh Fraser (Australian judge) (born 1957), Appeals Court justice at the Supreme Court of Queensland
- Hugh Fraser (East India Company officer) (1808–1858), British military officer in India in the 1850s
- Hugh Fraser (British judge) (1860–1927), British judge
- Hugh Fraser (retailer) (1815–1873), founder of House of Fraser

== See also ==
- Hugh Fraser, Baronet of Allander (disambiguation)
- Hugh Frazer (disambiguation)
