= Freda Thompson =

Australian pioneer aviator (1909–1980)

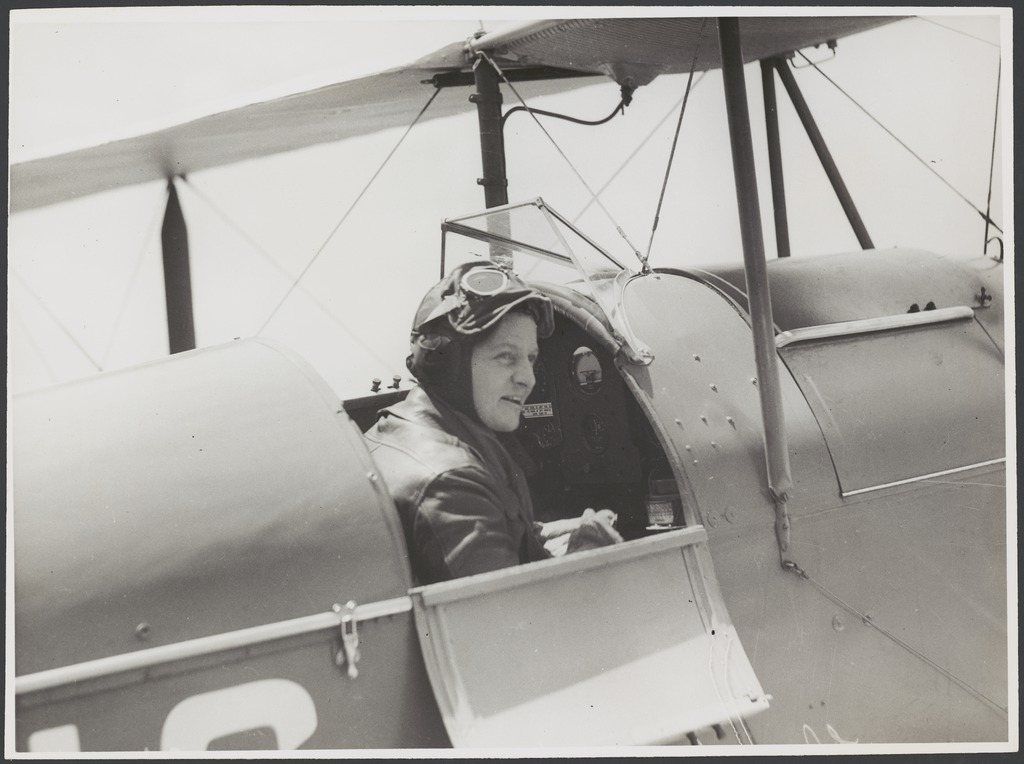
- Freda Thompson in her de Havilland DH.60G-III Moth Major
- Born: Freda Thompson
- Aviation career
- Famous flights: first Australian woman to fly solo from the United Kingdom to Australia

Freda Thompson OBE (5 April 1909 – 11 December 1980) was a pioneer aviator, the first Australian woman to fly solo from the United Kingdom to Australia.

== Early life ==
Born at South Yarra, Melbourne Victoria to parents Frederick and Martha Thompson. Thompson was educated at Toorak College in Melbourne leaving with Honours, Proficiency Certificates Pianoforte and Ice Skating.

== Flying qualification and early career ==
On 28 May 1930 Thompson took her first flight as a pilot and later that year obtained her A Licence. In 1932 she became the fifth woman in Australia to gain a 'B' Commercial Pilot licence. She qualified as a flying instructor in 1933 and was reported as the first woman in the British Empire to receive an instructors licence.

In April 1934 Thompson sailed for England to collect a new De Havilland Moth Major, which she named Christopher Robin. It had been fitted with long range fuel tanks for the journey to Australia. Thompson had accumulated over 250 hours of flying experience by this time. On 28 September 1934 Thompson left Lympne, Kent for Australia, flying solo. The trip took 39 days with the actual flying time being 19 days. Thompson damaged her aeroplane G-ACUC (VH-UUC) when she made a precautionary landing at Megara, Greece, and was delayed for 20 days waiting for a spare part for a damaged wing. Thompson arrived in Darwin on 6 November, and at Mascot, Sydney on 20 November 1934.

== WWII ==
Thompson was commandant of the Woman's Air Training Corps in Victoria from 1940–1942. During the course of WWII she applied to join the Women's Auxiliary Australian Air Force but did not receive a response and in 1942 she enlisted in the Australian Women's Army Service.

== Later career ==
Following WWII Thompson bought a de Havilland Hornet Moth, and named it Christopher Robin II. She flew extensively within Australia, and in 1952 to the Territory of Papua and New Guinea. She competed in air races and formation-flying events. She won forty-seven trophies. She was president in 1948 of the Royal Victorian Aero Club. By 1980 she had logged 3330 flying hours.

== Death ==
Thompson died at Malvern in 1980 and was cremated.

== Awards & Legacy ==
In 1937 Thompson was awarded King George VI's coronation medal and in 1953 she was awarded Queen Elizabeth II's coronation medal. In 1937 Thompson was appointed an Officer of the Order of the British Empire (OBE).

Thompson's papers were donated to the National Library of Australia in 1990, and the collection includes her 1930s air pilot's cap and goggles.

In 1994 she was honoured by the issue of a postage stamp by Australia Post, one of a series depicting Australian aviators also including Stanley Goble and Ivor McIntyre, Lawrence Hargrave, Sir Keith and Sir Ross Macpherson Smith. Thompson was inducted onto the Victorian Honour Roll of Women in 2001.

== Sources ==
- "Thompson, Freda (1906–1980)". Australian Women.
- Thompson's papers were donated to the National Library of Australia in 1990 her sister, Claire Embling "Papers of Freda Thompson (1906–1980)". National Library of Australia.
- Dennis, Val (2002). "Thompson, Freda Mary (1906–1980)". Australian Dictionary of Biography. National Centre of Biography, Australian National University. ISBN 978-0-522-84459-7. ISSN 1833-7538. OCLC 70677943.
