= History of Australian naval aviation =

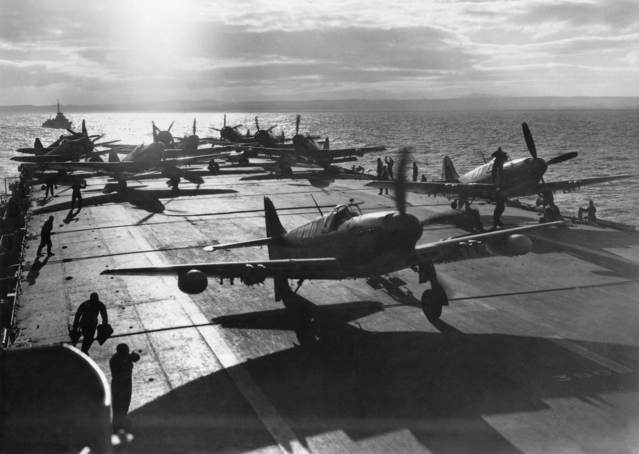
Firefly aircraft on board HMAS Sydney during her Korean War deployment

The first involvement Australia had with naval aviation was in 1911, when an Australian-born Royal Navy officer became one of the first four naval officers to receive pilot qualifications. During World War I, the Royal Australian Navy (RAN) experienced several forms of airborne operation, with HMAS Brisbane operating a seaplane, while HMA Ships Sydney and Australia were used for experiments with aircraft launch platforms. An aircraft embarked aboard Sydney was also involved in one of the first naval air battles. Several Australians also flew as part of the Royal Naval Air Service.

After the war's end, attempts to establish a naval aviation capability were met with opposition, and naval aviation fell under the control of the Royal Australian Air Force (RAAF). During the late 1920s and early 1930s, amphibious aircraft were operated from the seaplane carrier HMAS Albatross, with a new aircraft, the Supermarine Walrus, designed for operation from this platform. Albatross was removed from service in the mid-1930s, with the focus of naval aviation transferred to the RAN's five-ship cruiser force. Although useful for reconnaissance, improvements in carrier-based aviation and anti-aircraft defence saw the Walrus fall out of use during World War II. The impact of carrier aviation during the war prompted the foundation of a RAN-controlled Fleet Air Arm and the acquisition of two light fleet carriers, with the first, HMAS Sydney, entering service in 1948.

Sydney was the only non-US, non-UK aircraft carrier to be involved in the Korean War. The operation of a United States helicopter aboard Sydney during the war prompted the development of helicopter aviation in the Australian military. The RAN's second aircraft carrier, HMAS Melbourne, had encountered delays while upgrading to the latest technology, and the British aircraft carrier HMS Vengeance was loaned to the RAN from 1952 until 1955, when Melbourne was commissioned. Sydney was decommissioned and converted into a troop transport during the late 1950s, and the obsolescence of Melbourne's British-designed aircraft saw her reduced to helicopter operations until the mid-1960s, when new aircraft were purchased from the United States. Melbourne did not participate in the Vietnam War, although RAN pilots were used to support RAAF and United States Army helicopter units.

Following the decommissioning of Melbourne without replacement in the early 1980s, the Fleet Air Arm was reorganised to focus on helicopter operations from frigate-size ships, although fixed-wing aviation within the RAN continued with land-based aircraft used for patrols, electronic warfare training, transport, and hydrographic survey.

== Early 20th century and World War I ==
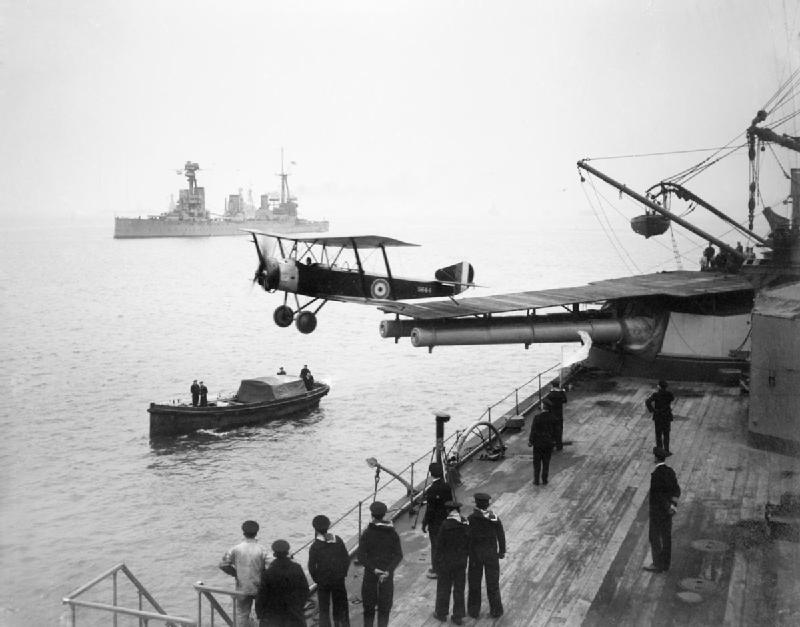
A Sopwith 1½ Strutter scout plane launching from one of Australia's turrets

One of the pioneers of naval aviation was Australian-born Royal Navy officer Arthur Longmore, who, on 25 April 1911, was among the first four naval officers to receive pilot qualifications. In the following years, Longmore conducted the first water landing in Britain, and the first deployment of a torpedo from an aircraft.

During the hunt for the merchant raider SMS Wolf in 1917, a Sopwith Baby seaplane was transferred from HMS Raven II to the light cruiser HMAS Brisbane. Brisbane's commanding officer, Claude Cumberlege, was impressed with the aircraft's operational capability and requested that several be acquired by the RAN, but when the Australian Commonwealth Naval Board expressed interest to the British Admiralty, they were rebuffed with claims that the use of seaplanes for naval aviation was "dying out".

In August 1917, HMAS Sydney was the first warship to be fitted with a rotatable aircraft launch platform. The cruiser was initially fitted with a Sopwith Pup, which was replaced in 1918 with a Sopwith Camel. On 1 June 1918, the Camel was launched to intercept two German aircraft, one of which is believed to have been shot down: naval historian David Hobbs calls it "one of the first naval air battles".

In December 1917, HMAS Australia became the first Australian warship to launch an aircraft from aboard ship (as opposed to Brisbane, which placed the seaplane in the water before launch), when a Sopwith Pup took off from the battlecruiser's quarterdeck. From March 1918 onwards, the battlecruiser HMAS Australia was used to test a new method of aircraft launch; this time from platforms secured on top of a gun turret and its barrels. Following the successful launch of a fully laden Sopwith 1½ Strutter scout plane on 14 May, the first aircraft launch from a turret platform, Australia was fitted with platforms over her two midships turrets and started carrying two aircraft—a Strutter for reconnaissance, and a Sopwith Camel fighter—and operated them until the end of the war.

Over the course of World War I, over 80 Australians served as part of the Royal Navy Air Service (RNAS), including Australia's top flying aces of the war, Roderic Dallas and Robert A. Little. In April 1919, just before the end of the war, the RNAS and the Army-operated Royal Flying Corps were merged to form the Royal Air Force: Australian personnel were absorbed into the new organisation, with many transferring to the RAAF on its foundation in March 1921.

== Between the wars and World War II ==
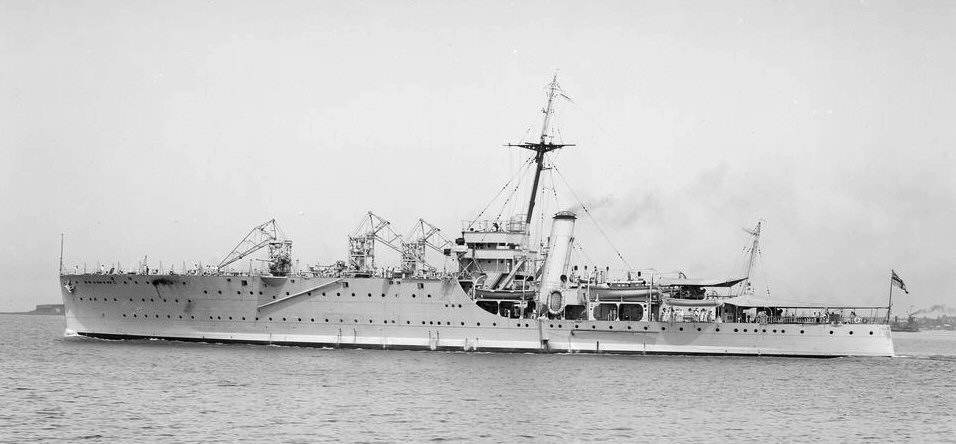
HMAS Albatross

In July 1920, Dumaresq, now Rear Admiral Commanding HM Australian Fleet, organised the loan of two Avro 504L seaplanes from the Australian Flying Corps to the RAN. Preliminary tests aboard the battlecruiser Australia showed promise, but were foiled when the ship was reduced to non-seagoing status by budget cuts, while trials aboard the cruiser HMAS Melbourne failed because the aircraft had trouble operating in the tropics, and was damaged when being loaded back aboard. The RAN ordered six Fairey IIID amphibious aircraft in 1920, but these were placed under RAAF control. Pilots were supplied by the RAAF, while observers and telegraphist air gunners were RAN personnel. In 1924, Stanley Goble and Ivor McIntyre, both RNAS veterans now serving with the RAAF, circumnavigated Australia in one of the amphibians, while another was assigned to HMAS Geranium to assist in hydrographic surveying. Another two Fairey IIIDs were assigned to hydrographic surveying operations, but these were shore-based. The amphibious aircraft were assigned to No. 101 Flight RAAF in 1926.

During the mid-1920s, the RAN attempted to acquire government support for an Australian Fleet Air Arm, modelled loosely on the RNAS and its Royal Air Force-controlled successor, the Fleet Air Arm. This was approved as part of improvements to Australia's military, but opposition by the RAAF prompted the Cabinet to rescind its approval in favour of continuing RAAF control of naval aviation. In 1925, the Governor-General Lord Stonehaven announced the construction of a seaplane carrier, to the surprise of both the RAN and RAAF. Laid down in 1926, HMAS Albatross was commissioned into the RAN shortly after the Fairey IIID, the aircraft she had been designed to operate with was removed from service. The Faireys were replaced by the Supermarine Seagull Mark III in 1926, which had been employed on surveys of the Great Barrier Reef while Albatross was completed. The Mark IIIs were unsuited for operations with Albatross, particularly as the aircraft were not durable enough to withstand catapult launches. Specifications for a new aircraft design were drawn up to the RAN and RAAF, and Supermarine designed the Seagull V (later to be called the Walrus). Designed for catapult launches and to survive rougher weather and sea conditions, the Walrus entered service two months after Albatross was reduced to non-seagoing status. Albatross was transferred to the Royal Navy in 1938 as part payment for the cruiser HMAS Hobart.

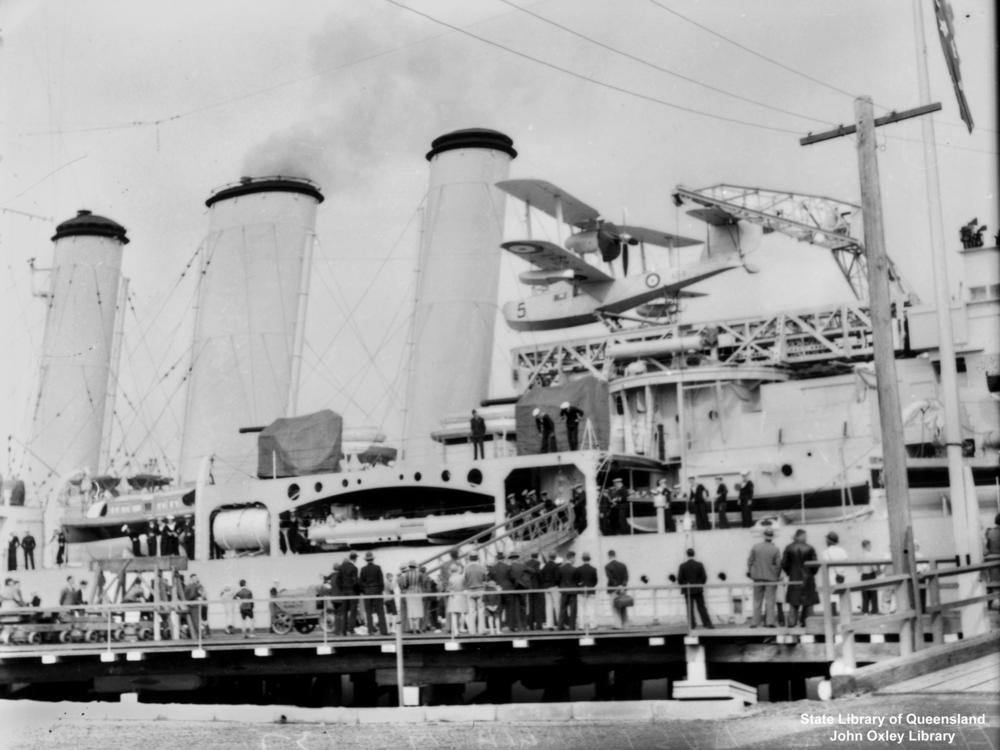
A Supermarine Walrus stowed on the catapult of the heavy cruiser HMAS Australia

From 1935, naval aviation was focused on the RAN's cruiser force: two County-class heavy cruisers and three Town-class light cruisers, each operating a single Supermarine Walrus amphibious aircraft from a deck-mounted catapult. In 1936, No. 101 Flight was expanded and redesignated No. 5 Squadron, then redesignated No. 9 Squadron at the start of 1939. During World War II, Walruses were used to increase the surveillance range of each ship, particularly during hunts for German commerce raiders. Four aircraft were lost during the war; two shot down by Axis aircraft, one damaged beyond repair by British fighters, and one destroyed on deck during the battle between HMAS Sydney and the German auxiliary cruiser Kormoran. During the Pacific campaign, the prevalence of United States Navy aircraft carriers negated the need for cruiser-based aircraft, and the growing improvements in both ship-based anti-aircraft weaponry and other aircraft compared to the Walrus meant the amphibian saw less and less use. By 1944, all Walruses had been removed from Australian ships, and No. 9 Squadron was disbanded at the end of the year. The lack of opportunity for naval aviation service in the RAN meant that many interested personnel went overseas to serve with the British Fleet Air Arm, including Victor Smith, or transferred to the RAAF.

== Foundation of the RAN Fleet Air Arm ==
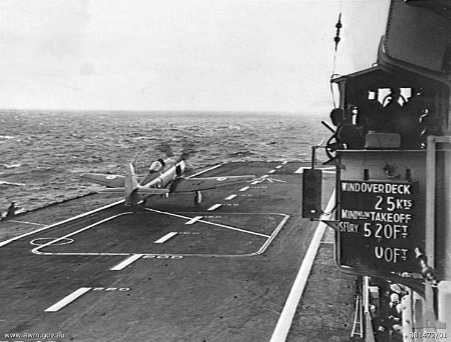
A Hawker Sea Fury on the flight deck of the carrier HMAS Sydney, during the ship's 1949 flight trials

The successes of naval aviation during World War II reignited the idea of a RAN-controlled aviation force, with suggestions that Australia provide the personnel to operate a British aircraft carrier and the attached squadrons voiced by the government in 1944 as part of a broader offer to help address the Royal Navy's personnel shortage. The Admiralty deemed a Colossus-class light fleet carrier to be the most appropriate vessel, and Venerable was initially proposed for transfer to the RAN as a gift or on loan. The plan was deferred on the Australian end until a review of manpower requirements across the entire war effort was completed. The ship manning proposal was revisited in mid-1945, but the surrender of Germany in May meant that British shortages were not as problematic; as a counteroffer, the purchase of the Colossus-class carrier Ocean by Australia was suggested. The Australian government decided against the purchase of Ocean in June.

A review by the Australian Government's Defence Committee held after World War II recommended that the post-war forces of the RAN be structured around a Task Force incorporating multiple aircraft carriers. Initial plans were for three carriers, with two active and a third in reserve, although funding cuts led to the purchase of the Majestic-class light fleet carriers, Majestic and Terrible from the Royal Navy in June 1947. A Fleet Air Arm was established on 3 July 1947 by the Commonwealth Defence Council to operate aircraft from these two carriers, and also maintain two former RAAF bases as support facilities: these became HMAS Albatross at Nowra, New South Wales, and HMAS Nirimba at Schofields, New South Wales. As Terrible was the closer of the two ships to completion, construction was finished without major modification. The ship was commissioned into the RAN as HMAS Sydney on 16 December 1948. Sydney's maiden voyage saw the delivery of the first two squadrons operated by the Fleet Air Arm: 805 Squadron with Hawker Sea Furies, and 816 Squadron with Fairey Fireflies. The two squadrons operated as the 20th Carrier Air Group (CAG). Sydney returned to England in 1950 to collect the 21st CAG: 808 and 817 Squadrons, with Sea Furies and Fireflies, respectively.

== Cold War carrier aviation ==
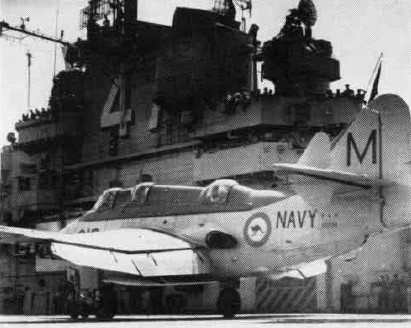
RAN Gannet aboard USS Philippine Sea

During the Korean War, Sydney was deployed to Korean waters in late 1951, with a wartime CAG of 805, 808, and 817 Squadrons embarked. The Fleet Air Arm operated in a strike, ground support, and escort role during the deployment, which saw three RAN pilots killed and a fourth seriously wounded, while thirteen aircraft were lost. Nine of these were shot down by North Korean flak artillery, with aircraft damaged by flak on at least ninety other occasions. The other four were lost in deck accidents, or crashed because of foul weather. Meanwhile, Majestic was undergoing major upgrades during construction to operate jet aircraft, including the installation of an angled flight deck, steam catapult, and a mirror landing aid. To allow the RAN to operate as a two-carrier force while Majestic was completed, the Royal Navy loaned the Colossus-class light carrier HMS Vengeance to the RAN in late 1952. Vengeance arrived in Australia with three Bristol Sycamore helicopters for the Fleet Air Arm. Although not the first helicopters to see military service in Australia (that title belonging to a Sikorsky S-51 of the RAAF), the Sycamores formed the first Australian military helicopter squadron, and prompted the establishment of Australia's first helicopter pilot school.

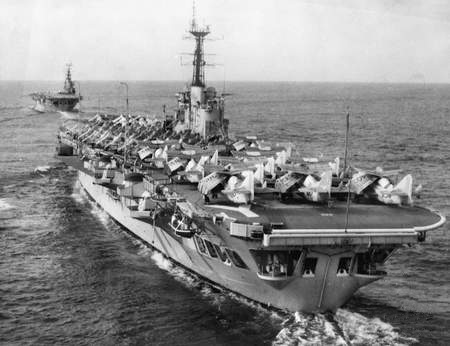
Sydney (background) leading Melbourne (foreground) during the latter's 1956 arrival in Australian waters

Vengeance was returned to the United Kingdom in 1955, with the crew transferred to Majestic, which was commissioned into the RAN as HMAS Melbourne on 28 October 1955. The new carrier delivered new aircraft to the Fleet Air Arm: the de Havilland Sea Venom jet fighter-bomber for 805 and 808 Squadrons, and the turboprop-driven Fairey Gannet anti-submarine aircraft for 816 and 817 Squadrons. These aircraft were due to become obsolete in the late 1950s, and the RAN considered purchasing modern aircraft of French or Italian design, which were smaller than British developments and better suited to light carrier operations. By the end of the 1950s, with Sydney decommissioned from service and refitted as a troop transport, it was decided that fixed-wing naval aviation would be replaced by a force of 27 Westland Wessex anti-submarine helicopters, to operate from Melbourne. This decision was rescinded in 1963, with Grumman S-2E Tracker anti-submarine aircraft and McDonnell Douglas A-4G Skyhawk fighter aircraft ordered for the Fleet Air Arm. Although Melbourne and her air group played no role in the Vietnam War, Australian naval aviators saw action as part of Royal Australian Navy Helicopter Flight Vietnam (a component of the joint Australian-American Experimental Military Unit) and the RAN Detachment, 9 Squadron Vietnam (attached to No. 9 Squadron RAAF).

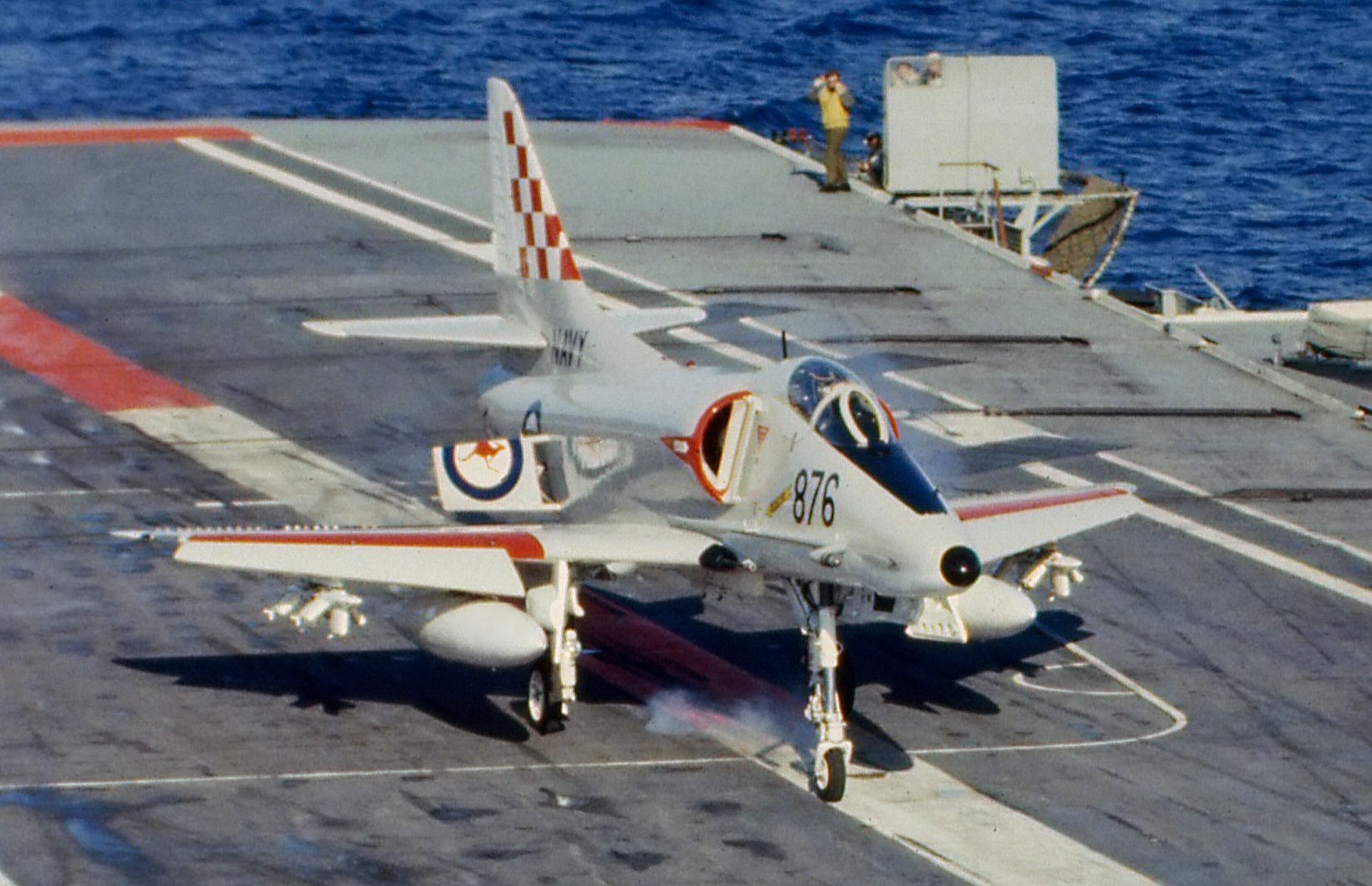
A-4 Skyhawk lands on Melbourne

In 1972, the Fleet Air Arm's Wessex helicopters were replaced with Westland Sea King anti-submarine helicopters, although a small number of Wessexes continued to serve in utility and search-and-rescue roles. Melbourne remained in service until mid-1982, when she was placed in reserve. Planning for a replacement began in 1981, and after considering American, Italian, and Spanish designs, the Australian government accepted a British offer to sell HMS Invincible, which would be operated with Harriers and helicopters. However, the Royal Navy withdrew the offer after the ship's performance in the Falklands War disproved the argument that she was surplus to requirements, and the 1983 election of the Australian Labor Party led to the cancellation of plans to replace Melbourne. With no aircraft carrier, carrier-borne fixed-wing aviation in the RAN ended on 30 June 1983 with the decommissioning of several squadrons, and many RAN pilots joined the Army and RAAF, or transferred to the aviation branches of other nations' navies. The RAN Skyhawks were sold to the Royal New Zealand Air Force, and the Trackers were removed from service and sold to a private company for disposal. Before being sold off, the RAN Trackers were flown from land bases as patrol and surveillance aircraft, and HS 748 aircraft continued on in the electronic warfare training and transport roles after all other fixed-wing assets were disposed of.

== Helicopters to the fore ==
The shift from full, carrier-embarked squadrons to single- or two-helicopter flights operating from frigates forced overhauls of the management and organisational style of the FAA, with squadrons made to act with increasing independence and less experienced junior officers taking greater responsibility for the aviation activities of their assigned ship. During the 1980s, the Eurocopter Ecureuil (Squirrel) and Sikorsky S-70 Seahawk were acquired to operate from the Adelaide-class frigates. During the early 1990s, these helicopters operated aboard Australian ships deployed to support the international coalition during the Gulf War; they were used for anti-air surveillance and surface search, to deliver boarding parties to interdicted ships, and provide search-and-rescue capabilities. During 1992, FAA Sea Kings were embarked aboard HMAS Tobruk for Operation Solace, part of the famine-relief operation in Somalia.

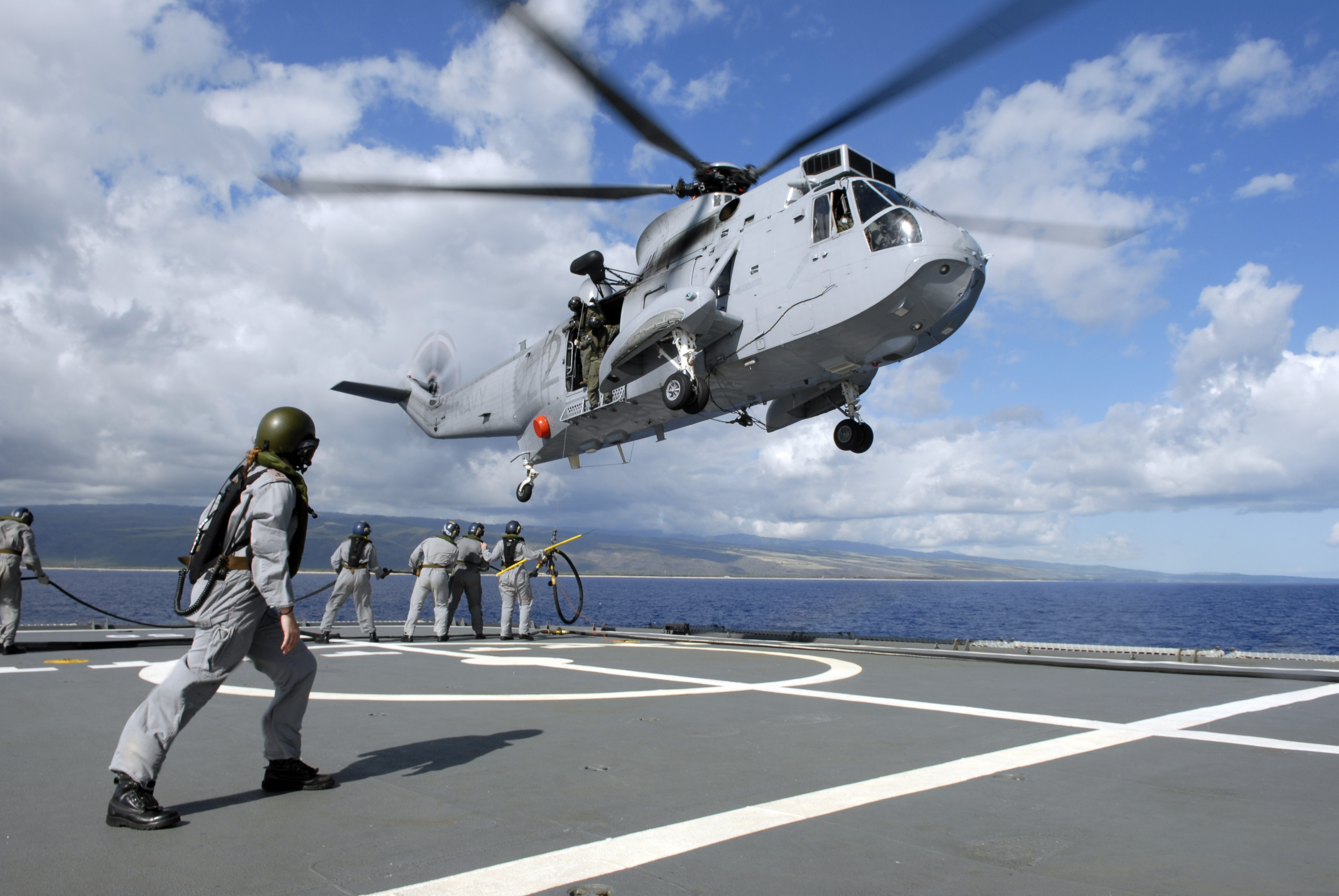
A Sea King hovering above the flight deck of HMAS Tobruk in 2008, prior to a helicopter in-flight refuel exercise

During the 1990s, the FAA ordered several refurbished Kaman SH-2G Super Seasprite helicopters to operate from the Anzac-class frigates in the anti-submarine and anti-surface roles. Although due to enter service in the early 2000s, the helicopters were not operational until 2006, and were grounded shortly after with concerns over their airworthiness, flight control system, crash survivability, and inability to operate in poor weather. The delays and problems with the acquisition led to the cancellation of the project in March 2008, and the completed helicopters were returned to Kaman.

Since 2000, when the last pair of HS 748s were retired, the Fleet Air Arm has been an entirely rotary-winged force, although the RAN continues to operate a Bombardier Dash 8 aircraft under the control of the Australian Hydrographic Service. The Fleet Air Arm became responsible for the operation and maintenance of the RAN's helicopter force from the frigates of the Adelaide and Anzac classes and from the RAN's amphibious and support ships.

== See also ==
- Fleet Air Arm Museum (Australia)
