= Hugh Fraser, Baronet of Allander =

Hugh Fraser, Baronet of Allander may refer to:

- Hugh Fraser, 1st Baron Fraser of Allander (1903–1966), 1st Baronet
- Sir Hugh Fraser, 2nd Baronet (1936–1987), his son

== See also ==
- Hugh Fraser (disambiguation)
