= Baron Fraser of Allander =

Extinct barony in the Peerage of the United Kingdom

Baron Fraser of Allander, of Dineiddwg in the County of Stirling, was a title in the United Kingdom. It was created on 30 December 1964 for the Scottish businessman Hugh Fraser, grandson of Hugh Fraser of the House of Fraser department store group. He had previously been created a Baronet, of Dineiddwg in the County of Stirling, in the Baronetage of the United Kingdom on 19 January 1961. He was succeeded by his only son, the second Baron, who disclaimed the peerage for life in 1966. Known thereafter as Sir Hugh Fraser, 2nd Baronet, he only sired daughters, so at his death in 1987 both the peerage and baronetcy became extinct.

== Barons Fraser of Allander (1964) ==
- Hugh Fraser, 1st Baron Fraser of Allander (1903–1966)
- Hugh Fraser, 2nd Baron Fraser of Allander (1936–1987) (disclaimed 1966)

== Arms ==
Coat of arms of Baron Fraser of Allander
Motto By Courage and Endeavour
