= Ivor McIntyre =

Australian Air Force pilot (1899–1928)

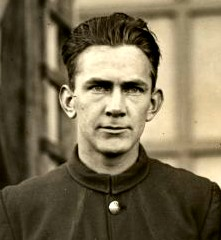
- Ivor McIntyre in the 1920s
- Born: 6 October 1899; Kent, England
- Died: 12 March 1928 (aged 28); Adelaide, South Australia
- Military career
- Allegiance: United Kingdom; Australia
- Branch: Royal Naval Air Service; Royal Air Force; Royal Australian Air Force
- Service years: 1917–28
- Rank: Flight Lieutenant
- Conflicts: World War I
- Awards: Commander of the Order of the British Empire; Air Force Cross & Bar

Ivor Ewing McIntyre (6 October 1899 – 12 March 1928) was an Australian pilot who served in the Royal Australian Air Force (RAAF). He gained national recognition in 1924, when he and Wing Commander Stanley Goble became the first men to circumnavigate Australia by air. Two years later, under the command of Group Captain Richard Williams, McIntyre piloted the first international flight undertaken by an RAAF plane and crew; this feat earned him the first Air Force Cross awarded to an RAAF member. Born and raised in England, McIntyre had served with the Royal Naval Air Service and Royal Air Force in World War I before joining the RAAF. He left the Air Force in 1927 to become an instructor with the South Australian branch of the Australian Aero Club, and died after a plane crash the following year.

== Early career ==
Ivor Ewing McIntyre was born on 6 October 1899 in Kent, England, the son of Captain Duncan McIntyre. He joined the Royal Naval Air Service (RNAS) in 1917, and saw action in World War I as a flight sub-lieutenant. McIntyre transferred to the Royal Air Force (RAF) on its creation as an independent service in 1918, and was a lieutenant when awarded the Air Force Cross in the 1919 New Year Honours. He was granted a short-service commission in the RAF as a flying officer on 12 December 1919.

McIntyre joined the Royal Australian Air Force (RAAF) in 1923. In November that year, he piloted a survey flight between Melbourne and Sydney, and carried out a similar mission between Melbourne and Hobart in February 1924. In July 1925, McIntyre was tasked by the Chief of the Air Staff with intercepting a squadron of the United States Pacific Fleet as it approached Melbourne on a flag-waving visit; he succeeded in doing so despite poor weather and not without, according to the official history of the inter-war RAAF, "an enormous element of luck, not to mention risk".

== Pioneering flights ==
=== Circumnavigation of Australia ===
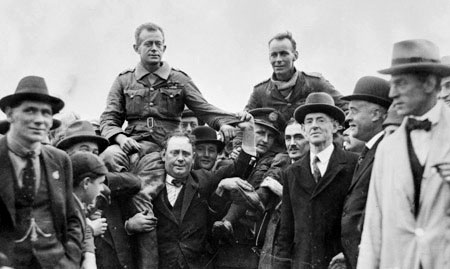
Ivor McIntyre (right) and Stanley Goble (left) chaired by the crowd on St Kilda Beach after their round-Australia flight in 1924

In 1924, McIntyre and Wing Commander (later Air Vice Marshal) Stanley Goble, another veteran of the RNAS, became the first men to circumnavigate Australia by air. McIntyre was lead pilot while Goble, who was Chief of the Air Staff at the time, acted as commander and navigator. The pair took off from Point Cook, Victoria, on 6 April 1924 in a single-engined Fairey IIID floatplane. They flew anticlockwise along the eastern coast to Thursday Island, Queensland, then crossed the Gulf of Carpentaria to Darwin, Northern Territory, and continued along the Western Australian and South Australian coasts. Along the way they faced adverse weather, fatigue and illness, and had to deal with engine problems and fuel leaks.

McIntyre and Goble returned to Victoria after covering 8,450 miles (13,600 km) in 44 days. As they flew over Point Cook, 12 RAAF aircraft took off to escort them to their landing place at St Kilda Beach, where a crowd of 10,000 people was waiting to welcome them. Prime Minister Stanley Bruce called the journey "one of the most wonderful accomplishments in the history of aviation"; his government presented McIntyre with a gift of £250, while mission commander Goble received £500. The British Royal Aero Club awarded the duo the annual Britannia Trophy, and they were appointed Commanders of the Order of the British Empire (CBE) in the 1924 Birthday Honours. McIntyre was also awarded the Oswald Watt Gold Medal for 1924, and promoted to flight lieutenant effective from 31 March that year.

=== Pacific Islands flight ===
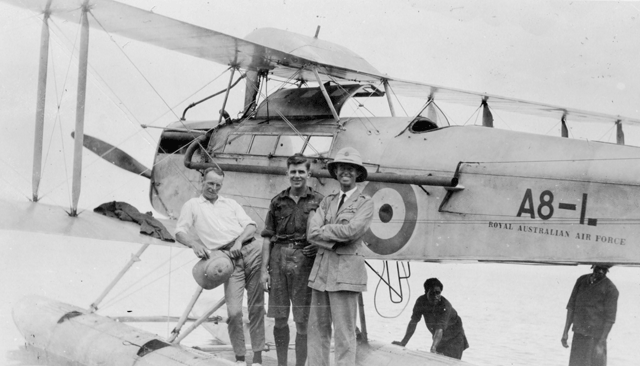
McIntyre (left), Les Trist (centre) and Richard Williams (right) on their Pacific Islands flight in 1926

In 1926, McIntyre was selected as lead pilot on another pioneering Australian flight under the command of the then-Chief of the Air Staff, Group Captain (later Air Marshal Sir) Richard Williams, to study the South Pacific region as a potential theatre of operations. In company with Flight Sergeant Les Trist, they took off from Point Cook on 26 September 1926 and made a 10,000-mile (16,000 km) round trip to the Solomon Islands in a De Havilland DH.50A floatplane. The DH.50's fuselage bore the words "Royal Australian Air Force", the first aircraft to do so. Like the circumnavigation of Australia in 1924, this flight was not without its difficulties. Approaching Southport, Queensland, on 29 September, the DH.50 lost power and had to land in the ocean; after making repairs, McIntyre was twice thrown clear of the aircraft while taxiing to the beach in heavy surf. The expedition returned on 7 December to a 12-plane RAAF escort and a 300-man honour guard.

Though subsequently described as partly a "matter of prestige" owing to rumours of other countries planning such a journey, as well as a "reaction" by Williams to the 1924 expedition led by Goble, Williams' rival at the time for leadership of the young Air Force, this was the first international flight undertaken by an RAAF plane and crew. McIntyre was awarded a second Oswald Watt Gold Medal, and a Bar to his AFC in the 1927 Birthday Honours, for his part in the flight; it marked the first occasion that the AFC was awarded to a member of the RAAF. Trist received the Air Force Medal, and Williams was appointed a CBE.

== Death and legacy ==
McIntyre left the RAAF in November 1927 to become a flying instructor for the newly formed South Australian section of the Australian Aero Club. He died in an Adelaide hospital on 12 March 1928 of injuries received the previous day, when he crashed the club's Moth trainer while giving an aerobatics display at Parafield. Goble said of him:

"That he did sterling work with our air force is well known, but it is doubtful whether the majority of the people in Australia have a true appreciation of the greatness of this man and the magnitude and difficulties of many of the tasks he performed."

In 1994, McIntye and Goble were honoured by the issue of a postage stamp by Australia Post, one of a series depicting Australian aviators that also included Freda Thompson, Lawrence Hargrave, Sir Keith and Sir Ross Macpherson Smith.
