= Stanley Goble =

Royal Australian Air Force chief (1891–1948)

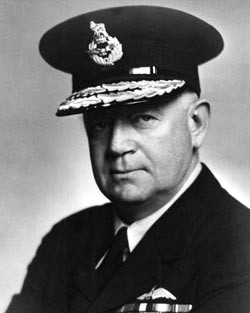
- Official RAAF portrait of Air Vice-Marshal Stanley Goble
- Born: 21 August 1891; Croydon, Victoria
- Died: 24 July 1948 (aged 56); Heidelberg, Victoria
- Military career
- Allegiance: Australia
- Branch: Royal Australian Air Force
- Service years: 1915–46
- Rank: Air Vice-Marshal
- Unit: No. 8 Squadron RNAS (1916–17)
- Commands: No. 5 Squadron RNAS (1917–18); Chief of the Air Staff (1922–25, 1932–34, 1939–40); No. 2 Group RAF (1936–37)
- Conflicts: World War I World War II
- Awards: Commander of the Order of the British Empire; Distinguished Service Order; Distinguished Service Cross; Mentioned in Despatches (2); Croix de Guerre (France)

Air Vice-Marshal Stanley James Goble, CBE, DSO, DSC (21 August 1891 – 24 July 1948) was a senior commander in the Royal Australian Air Force (RAAF). He served three terms as Chief of the Air Staff, alternating with Wing Commander (later Air Marshal Sir) Richard Williams. Goble came to national attention in 1924 when he and fellow RAAF pilot Ivor McIntyre became the first men to circumnavigate Australia by air, journeying 13,600 kilometres (8,500 mi) in a single-engined floatplane.

During World War I, Goble flew fighters on the Western Front with the British Royal Naval Air Service. He became an ace with ten victories, commanded No. 5 Squadron (later No. 205 Squadron RAF), and was awarded the Distinguished Service Order and the Distinguished Service Cross. Returning to Australia, Goble assisted in the formation of the RAAF as an independent branch of the Australian armed forces. On an exchange posting to Britain in the 1930s, he led No. 2 (Bomber) Group RAF, and was promoted to air vice-marshal in 1937.

As Chief of the Air Staff at the onset of World War II, Goble clashed with the federal government over implementation of the Empire Air Training Scheme, which he believed would be detrimental to the defence of Australia. He stepped down as leader of the RAAF in early 1940, and spent the rest of the war in Ottawa as Air Liaison Officer to Canada. Goble died in 1948 at the age of fifty-six, two years after retiring from the military.

== Early career ==
Born in Croydon, Victoria, Stanley James (Jimmy) Goble was one of four sons to an Australian father, George, and an English mother, Ann. He apparently received little schooling, and began his working life as a clerk with the Victorian Railways when he was sixteen. By twenty-three he was, like his father, a stationmaster, the youngest appointed in the department, and a footballer with Brunswick in the Victorian Football Association.

Goble was prevented from joining the Australian Imperial Force at the beginning of World War I after failing the stringent medical criteria; he wrote later that "only applicants of the finest physiques were considered suitable for the first contingent of Australian troops". With his three brothers already on active service, he decided to travel to England at his own expense and enlist in the British armed forces.

== World War I ==
Goble was accepted for flying training with the Royal Naval Air Service (RNAS) in July 1915. After graduating as a flight sub-lieutenant on 20 October 1915, he became a test pilot and undertook anti-submarine patrols out of Dover. Goble commenced operations with only three hours' solo flying experience. Towards the end of the year he was posted across the Channel to Dunkirk, flying Caudron reconnaissance-bombers and Sopwith Pup fighters.

... I was detailed to carry out what was termed a fighting patrol in a twin-engined Caudron. My armament was a Very pistol and my gunner was supplied with a rifle ... I discovered that my gunner had never been in the air, had never fired a rifle in his life ... I had not seen a twin-engined Caudron until after dark on the previous evening and could not even obtain a map of the front ... Fortunately this highly efficient fighting combination found nothing to fight.

— Goble on his introduction to operations at the Western Front, 1915

Goble was a founding member of No. 8 Squadron RNAS in 1916, during the latter part of the Battle of the Somme, where he flew both Pups and Nieuport fighters. He earned the Distinguished Service Cross for his actions on 24 September 1916, when he engaged two enemy fighters near Ghistelles in West Flanders, "and brought one of them down on fire in a spiral nose-dive", according to the citation in The London Gazette. This victory was the first confirmed "kill" achieved by an Allied pilot flying the Pup. Goble was promoted to flight lieutenant on 1 October, and won the French Croix de Guerre later that month.

On 17 February 1917, Goble was awarded the Distinguished Service Order (DSO) for his "conspicuous bravery and skill" in three separate actions while operating with No. 8 Squadron: on 7 November 1916 when he forced a hostile fighter down in a field, where it crashed attempting to land; on 27 November when he engaged four enemy aircraft, destroying one; and on 4 December when, in repeated combats while escorting Allied bombers, he helped drive off attacking fighters and shot down one of them. The same month that he was awarded the DSO, Goble was posted to No. 5 Squadron RNAS at Petite-Synthe near the Franco-Belgian border, flying Airco DH.4 two-seat light bombers.

Goble was promoted twice in 1917, to flight commander in June, then squadron commander in December. He led No. 5 Squadron for the latter part of the year and into 1918. His unit supported the British Fifth Army as it bore the brunt of the German spring offensive, and he had to evacuate his airfield when it was shelled by advancing enemy artillery. Relocating twice to other landing grounds, he kept his squadron on the attack, and was subsequently recognised by a commendation circulated to all RNAS combat units. When the RNAS merged with the British Army's Royal Flying Corps on 1 April 1918, Goble became a major in the newly formed Royal Air Force. Twice mentioned in despatches, he finished the war an ace, with ten victories. Although forced to crash land on two occasions, he had avoided any injury during his active service.

== Inter-war years ==
=== Establishment of the Royal Australian Air Force ===
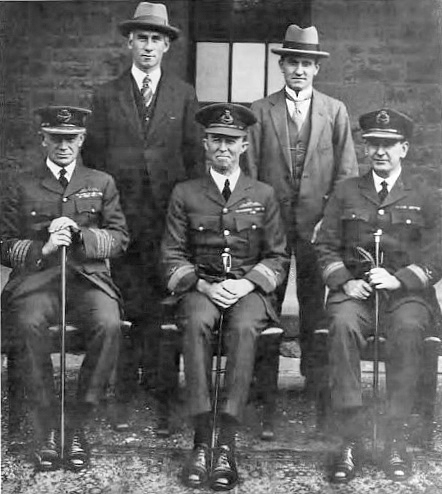
RAAF Air Board in 1928: Group Captain Goble, Director of Personnel and Training (front, left), with Air Commodore Williams, Chief of the Air Staff (front, centre)

Goble returned to Australia on HT Gaika in November 1918. He was appointed an Officer of the Order of the British Empire in the 1919 New Year Honours, and made an acting lieutenant colonel in May that year. He received a permanent commission as a squadron leader and honorary wing commander in the RAF on 1 August 1919, and was seconded to the Royal Australian Navy.

When a temporary Air Board was set up to examine the feasibility of an Australian Air Force (AAF), Goble was assigned as a Navy representative, and Lieutenant Colonel Richard Williams, an Australian Flying Corps veteran of World War I, acted as an Army spokesman. The permanent Australian Air Board was established on 9 November 1920, and recommended creation of the AAF as an independent branch of the armed services. The AAF came into being on 31 March 1921—the 'Royal' prefix being granted five months later—and Goble resigned his commission in the RAF the same day to transfer to the new service as a wing commander.

The Navy had nominated Goble as First Air Member (later Chief of the Air Staff), but Williams took the post and Goble became Second Air Member and Director of Personnel and Training. Williams and Goble would serve as Chief of the Air Staff (CAS) three times each between 1922 and 1940. One motive suggested for the rotation was a ploy by Army and Navy interests to limit Williams's autonomy. Instead, according to RAAF historian Alan Stephens, the arrangement "almost inevitably fostered an unproductive rivalry" between the two officers, which was "exacerbated by the personality differences between the pedantic, autocratic Williams and the cheerful, easy-going Goble". Although in a legal sense the Air Board led the RAAF rather than the CAS alone, Williams dominated the board to such an extent that Goble would later complain that his colleague appeared to consider the Air Force his personal command.

=== Chief of the Air Staff ===
The rivalry between Goble and Williams was such that it was later alleged that government practice was to ensure that they were never in the country at the same time. In October 1921, Goble was posted to Britain for a naval co-operation course; his place on the Air Board was taken by Squadron Leader Bill Anderson. Goble married Kathleen Wodehouse in London on Anzac Day, 1922, and returned to Australia later that year. His first term as CAS began when Williams left the country in December 1922 for study in England. Goble developed a plan to establish a small seaplane base at Rushcutters Bay in Sydney, but Williams cancelled this shortly after he returned to Australia in February 1925 to resume the position of CAS. Goble's suggestion of a separate Fleet Air Arm fostered suspicions that he was too closely aligned with naval interests. He departed for England to undertake study at the British Army Staff College in Camberley and RAF Staff College, Andover, as Williams had done two years before. Goble also served as Air Liaison Officer with the Australian High Commission in London from May 1926 to September 1927. He was promoted to group captain on 1 April 1928.

Raised to temporary air commodore, Goble took over as CAS for the second time between December 1932 and June 1934, while Williams attended the Imperial Defence College in London. On secondment to the RAF from 1935 to 1937, Goble was attached to the British Air Ministry as Deputy Director of Air Operations. In this capacity he attended a conference in 1936 to examine a Commonwealth-wide air training plan, a concept that would be revived in World War II as the Empire Air Training Scheme. Continuing his exchange posting, on 1 September Goble took over as Air Officer Commanding No. 2 (Bomber) Group, based in Hampshire. The group comprised fifteen squadrons, putting him in charge of a force stronger than the entire RAAF. On 28 February 1937, Goble was raised to temporary air vice-marshal. He succeeded Williams as Chief of the Air Staff for the last time in February 1939, when the latter was dismissed from his position in the aftermath of the Ellington Report criticising the standards of training and air safety observed by the RAAF. When he replaced Williams, Goble was Air Member for Personnel and might therefore have been considered more closely responsible for such standards; he maintained that Williams had personally overseen the service's air training since 1934.

=== Circumnavigation of Australia ===
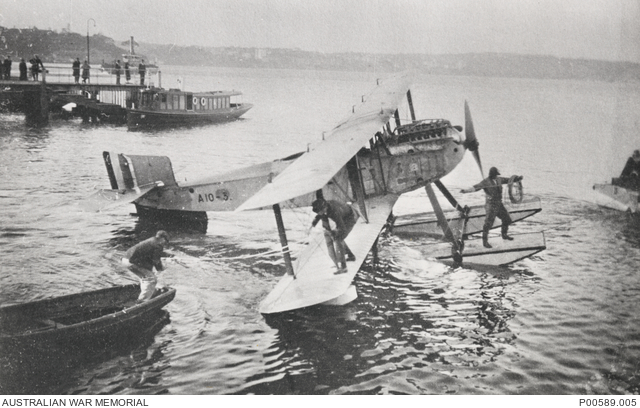
Fairey IIID seaplane flown by Wing Commander Goble and Flying Officer McIntyre on their 1924 circumnavigation of Australia

The young air force was a small, close-knit organisation comparable to a flying club, although several pioneering flights were undertaken by its members. One of the most notable was made by Goble and Flying Officer (later Flight Lieutenant) Ivor McIntyre in 1924, when they became the first men to circumnavigate Australia by air, in a single-engined Fairey IIID floatplane. The English-born McIntyre, who was lead pilot while Goble acted as commander and navigator, was also a World War I veteran of the Royal Naval Air Service. The purpose of the flight was to survey the northern coastline of Australia for defence planning, and to test the capabilities of the Fairey IIID.

Goble and McIntyre took off from Point Cook, Victoria, on 6 April 1924 and flew 8,450 miles (13,600 km) in 44 days, in often arduous conditions. Though well-prepared with fuel stocks and spare parts pre-positioned along the intended route, they had to contend with illness and tropical storms, as well as mid-air engine trouble and fuel leaks. Their journey took them anticlockwise around the continent, along the Eastern Australian coast through Sydney, Southport, Townsville and Thursday Island, crossing the Gulf of Carpentaria to Darwin, and then continuing along the coast through Broome, Carnarvon, Perth, Albany and Port Lincoln, before arriving back in Victoria. As they flew above Point Cook, twelve RAAF aircraft took to the air to escort them to their landing place at St Kilda Beach, where they were welcomed by a crowd of 10,000 people.

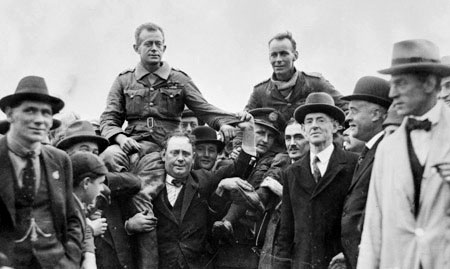
Goble (left) and McIntyre on St Kilda Beach

Prime Minister Stanley Bruce called the expedition "one of the most wonderful accomplishments in the history of aviation", his government presenting Goble with a gift of £500, and £250 to McIntyre. The British Royal Aero Club awarded them the annual Britannia Trophy, and they were appointed Commanders of the Order of the British Empire in the King's Birthday Honours. Though the flight is still acknowledged as one of the most important in Australian aviation, the necessity for the Air Force chief to personally command such a journey has been questioned, suggesting that it was motivated by the one-upmanship that characterised the Williams-Goble relationship. Two years later Williams would make a three-month, 10,000-mile (16,000 km) round trip from Point Cook to the Pacific Islands, the first international flight undertaken by an RAAF plane and crew, amid similar suspicions.

== World War II ==
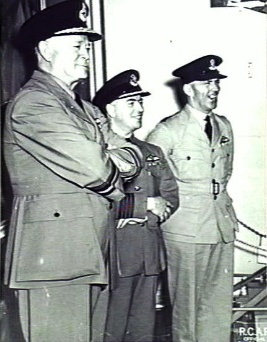
Air Vice-Marshal Goble (left) as Air Liaison Officer to Canada, 1941

As Chief of the Air Staff at the outbreak of World War II, Goble planned the expansion and decentralisation of the RAAF to meet the needs of home defence and Australia's obligations in Europe, which included the transfer of No. 10 Squadron to Britain. The Federal Government abandoned his concept of an autonomous Air Expeditionary Force in favour of full commitment to the Empire Air Training Scheme, which Goble considered detrimental to local defence. His proposal to organise the RAAF along functional lines, with Home Defence, Training, and Maintenance Commands, was similarly rejected. Goble also came into conflict with his deputy, Air Commodore John Russell, an RAF officer on exchange in Australia. These issues led Goble to tender his resignation as CAS, taking effect in January 1940. The Argus in Melbourne reported that "Goble wishes to resign 'on a matter of high principle'. It is known that he has been dissatisfied for some time with his relations with the Federal Government."

Prime Minister Robert Menzies had in any case been looking for a British officer to head the RAAF and confided to the UK High Commissioner, Sir Geoffrey Whiskard, that Goble's resignation was "undoubtedly very convenient". Following the interim appointment of Air Commodore Anderson, the Royal Air Force's Air Chief Marshal Sir Charles Burnett became Chief of the Air Staff; among other things, Burnett proceeded to reorganise the Air Force into a geographically based "area" system of command and control. Goble had offered to submit his resignation from the RAAF as well as from the position of CAS, and was considering a return to Britain for service with the RAF. Menzies persuaded him to remain and take on the role of Australian Air Liaison Officer to Canada, based in Ottawa. Raised to substantive air vice-marshal, Goble stayed at this post for the duration of the war and was the RAAF's representative at the Ottawa Conference in May–June 1942 that negotiated the Joint Commonwealth Air Training Plan.

== Retirement and legacy ==
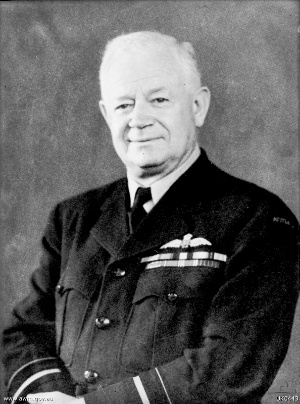
Jimmy Goble in 1943

In January 1946, Goble presided over the court-martial of Australia's top-scoring fighter ace, Group Captain Clive Caldwell. Charged with alcohol trafficking on the island of Morotai in 1945, Caldwell was found guilty and reduced to the rank of flight lieutenant; he left the Air Force soon after. Goble was himself forced into retirement in February 1946, despite being five years below the mandatory age of sixty. The Chief of the Air Staff, Air Vice-Marshal George Jones, in recommending Goble's dismissal, wrote that "this officer has a sound Service knowledge and an alert mind, but suffers from certain nervous characteristics which make continuous application to a task impossible". Other senior RAAF commanders who were veterans of World War I, including Richard Williams, were also retired at this time, ostensibly to make way for the advancement of younger officers.

Goble suffered from hypertensive cerebrovascular disease and died in Heidelberg, Victoria, on 24 July 1948. He was cremated, leaving his wife Kathleen, and three sons. His son John (born 1923) joined the Royal Australian Navy and qualified as a pilot in the Fleet Air Arm, rising to the rank of commodore and commanding 817 Squadron, the naval air station HMAS Albatross, and the aircraft carrier HMAS Melbourne. Goble Street in Hughes, Australian Capital Territory, was named for Jimmy Goble. In 1994 he and Ivor McIntyre were honoured with the issue of a postage stamp by Australia Post, in a series depicting Australian aviators that also included Freda Thompson, Lawrence Hargrave, and Sir Keith and Sir Ross Macpherson Smith.

== Notes ==
Military offices
Preceded by Richard Williams	Chief of the Air Staff; 1922–1925	Succeeded by Richard Williams
Preceded by Richard Williams	Chief of the Air Staff; 1932–1934	Succeeded by Richard Williams
Preceded by William Anderson	Air Member for Personnel; 1934	Succeeded by Hazelton Nicholl
Preceded by Bertine Sutton	Air Officer Commanding No. 2 Group RAF; 1936–1937	Succeeded by Charles Blount
Preceded by Hazelton Nicholl	Air Member for Personnel; 1938–1939	Succeeded by John Russell
Preceded by Richard Williams	Chief of the Air Staff; 1939–1940	Succeeded by William Anderson
