= Victor Warren =

Sir Victor Dunn Warren DL JP (1903–1953) was a 20th century Scottish explosives manufacturer who served as Lord Provost of Glasgow from 1949 to 1952.

== Life and work ==
He was born on 21 May 1903 in Glasgow, the son of David Dunn Warren (founder of Hunter and Warren explosives) and his wife Jean McCaull. The family lived at 5 Saltoun Gardens in the Dowanhill district.

He was educated at Kelvinside Academy, Warriston School, Moffat and Rossall School.

From at least 1929 he was Chairman of Hunter and Warren, explosives manufacturers. His company was taken over in 1949 by Imperial Chemical Industries (ICI).

He was elected Lord Provost in 1949, representing the Progressive Party. His most noteworthy roles, representing head of civil defence, was organising defences against nuclear war (in the post-war "duck-and cover" hysteria) and beginning the waves of slum clearance for which Glasgow became very famous.

He was knighted by King George VI in 1951.

He died in Glasgow on 3 March 1953.

== Family ==
In 1927 he married Mary Winifred Wishart (1900-1994).

== Artistic recognition ==
He was portrayed in office by William Oliphant Hutchison.
