= Hugh Frazer =

Hugh Frazer may refer to:

- Hugh Carroll Frazer (1891–1975), United States naval officer and Medal of Honor recipient
- Hugh Frazer (artist) (1795–1865), Irish landscape and genre painter

== See also ==
- Hugh Fraser (disambiguation)
