= Hugh Fraser (British judge) =

Sir Hugh Fraser

Justice of the High Court
- In office 1924 – 8 July 1927

Sir Hugh Fraser (1860 – 8 July 1927) was a British barrister and English High Court judge. An authority on libel, torts, and election law, he was the author of several important books in these areas. Unusually, he was appointed to the High Court in without having taken silk, though he had a large practice.

== Biography ==
The son of Thomas Fraser, of Farraline, Inverness-shire, Fraser was educated in England at Charterhouse School and Trinity Hall, Cambridge, where he was an exhibitioner, scholar, law student, and won the Cressingham Prize; in 1885 he was proxime accessit for the Chancellor’s medal for Legal Studies. He was called to the Bar in 1886 at the Inner Temple, where he was a scholar as well as a Inns of Court student.

Fraser was Lecturer on Equity to the Incorporated Law Society from 1888 to 1891, Reader and Examiner in Common Law at the Inns of Court from 1897 to 1924, and examined in Law at the Universities of Oxford, Cambridge and London. He was elected a Bencher of the Inner Temple in 1918 and an honorary fellow of Trinity Hall, Cambridge in 1925. He was knighted in 1917.

Fraser was known as an authority on libel, torts, and election law. His book on the law of torts went through 11 editions during his lifetime, and his book on libel through six. He had a large practice, but never took silk, preferring to remain at the junior bar. He was particularly renowned as a libel practitioner, and was retained in most of the major libel cases of his day. He was appointed arbitrator in the building trade dispute in 1923, a member of the Irish Deportees Compensation Tribunal from 1923 to 1924, and a member of the Committee for dealing with claims of Police Strikers in 1924.

Fraser was appointed to the High Court in 1924, and was assigned to the King's Bench Division. As a member of the junior bar, his appointment was extremely unusual; but was generally welcomed. He died in service in 1927.

== Bibliography ==
- Law of Torts, 11th edition
- Law of Libel and Slander, 6th edition
- Law of Parliamentary Elections and Election Petitions, 3rd edition
- Representation of People Act, 1918, 2nd edition
- Amid the High Hills, 1923
