= Sir Hugh Fraser, 2nd Baronet =

British baronet and businessman (1936–1987)

Sir Hugh Fraser, 2nd Baronet (18 December 1936 – 5 May 1987) formerly 2nd Baron Fraser of Allander, was a British chairman of the House of Fraser, Harrods, George Outram and Company, and Whyte and Mackay. He lived at Mugdock, near Milngavie, Scotland. He was the son of Hugh Fraser, 1st Baron Fraser of Allander, and inherited the Barony of Fraser of Allander on his father's death in 1966, but disclaimed it for life the same year. He has three daughters. He was not related to the politician Sir Hugh Fraser.

== Career ==
Fraser was educated at St Mary's School, Melrose and Kelvinside Academy. He was given an honorary doctorate by the University of Stirling, where one of the student residences is now named Fraser of Allander after him. In 1981, he gifted the Mugdock Castle estate (purchased by his father) to the regional council as a country park. In 1960, he established the Hugh Fraser Foundation for charitable work. He was also a major benefactor to the Glasgow Scout Association and was chairman of Dumbarton Football Club.

It was alleged by a Channel 5 documentary that Fraser put up the money for an attempted abduction of Ronnie Biggs from Brazil, so the latter could stand trial in Britain for his part in the Great Train Robbery.

Hugh Fraser died from cancer in 1987, aged 50.

Peerage of the United Kingdom
Preceded by Hugh Fraser	Baron Fraser of Allander; 1966	Disclaimed; Extinct (1987)
Baronetage of the United Kingdom
Preceded by Hugh Fraser	Baronet (of Dineiddwg); 1966–1987	Extinct
