= Hugh Fraser (retailer) =

British businesspeople (1815 - 1873)

- Born: 1815
- Died: 1873 (aged 57–58)
- Occupation: Businessman

Hugh Fraser (1815 - 1873) was the founder of House of Fraser, now one of the largest retail chains in the United Kingdom.

== Career ==
Born the son of a Dunbartonshire farmer, Fraser was apprenticed to Stewart & McDonald, a drapery warehouse in Glasgow, where he became a manager.

In 1849, he formed a partnership with James Arthur, another Glasgow shop owner, to open a drapery shop in Buchanan Street in Glasgow. Together they expanded the business developing in particular its wholesale business which Arthur took over completely in 1865. Fraser then went into partnership with Alexander McLaren to develop the retail side of the business and expanded it into one of the largest stores in Glasgow.

Fraser died in 1873 leaving his business to whichever of his five sons decided to take up a share in it: in the end three sons, one of whom was the father of Hugh Fraser, 1st Baron Fraser of Allander, did so and the business continued to develop.
