= Hugh Fraser, 1st Baron Fraser of Allander =

The Lord Fraser of Allander
- Born: 15 January 1903; Partick
- Died: 6 December 1966 (aged 63)
- Education: Glasgow Academy; Warriston School
- Occupation: businessman
- Spouse: Kathleen Hutcheon
- Children: 2

Hugh Fraser, 1st Baron Fraser of Allander (15 January 1903 – 6 November 1966), was the grandson of Hugh Fraser I, and the father of Sir Hugh Fraser, 2nd Baronet. He inherited his father's shop and built it into the large retail chain now known as House of Fraser.

== Career ==
Born in Partick, Hugh Fraser was educated at Glasgow Academy and Warriston School near Moffat. In 1919 he joined his father's business, a shop in Buchanan Street in Glasgow. He became Managing Director in 1924 and Chairman on his father's death in 1927. He expanded the business by acquisition buying department stores throughout Scotland as well as the John Barker Group and Harrods in England and Argentina. In 1948 he established Scottish & Universal Investments ('SUITS') to acquire non-retail businesses including the Glasgow Herald.

In 1945 he purchased Mugdock Castle from the 6th Duke of Montrose. He was created a baronet, styled "of Dineiddwg in the County of Stirling", in 1961, and was subsequently created the 1st Baron Fraser of Allander, of Dineiddwg in the County of Stirling, in 1964.

He died in 1966 at "Dineiddwg", his home at Mugdock.

== Family ==
In 1931, he married Kathleen Hutcheon and together they went on to have one son (Hugh Fraser) and one daughter.

== Arms ==
Coat of arms of Hugh Fraser, 1st Baron Fraser of Allander
Motto By Courage and Endeavour

Peerage of the United Kingdom
New creation	Baron Fraser of Allander; 1964–1966	Succeeded by Hugh Fraser
Baronetage of the United Kingdom
New creation	Baronet (of Dineiddwg); 1961–1966	Succeeded by Hugh Fraser
