= Ross Macpherson Smith =

Australian aviator (1892–1922)

Sir Ross Macpherson Smith
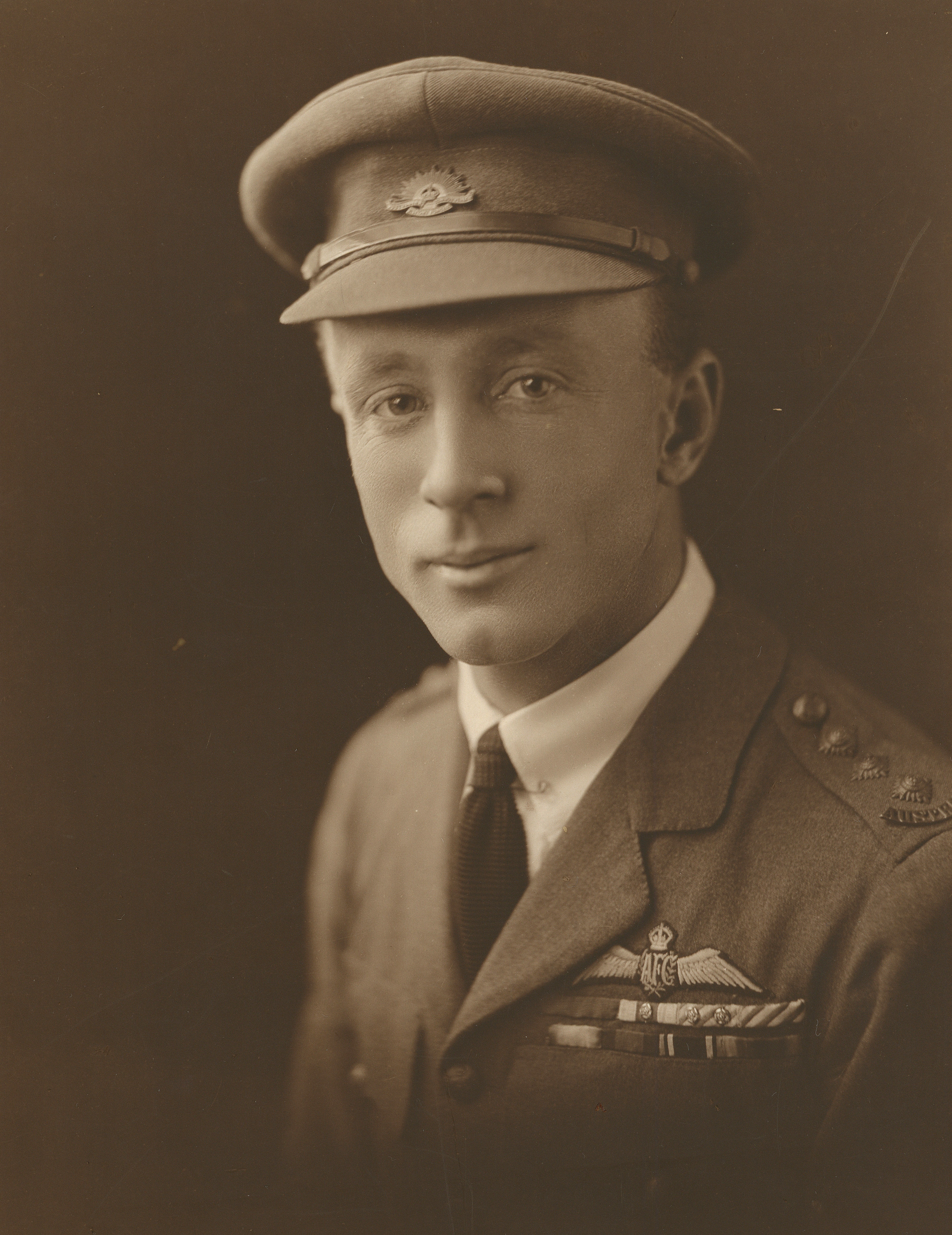
- Born: 4 December 1892; Semaphore, South Australia
- Died: 13 April 1922 (aged 29); Weybridge, England
- Cause of death: Aviation accident
- Known for: Flying ace, pioneering aviator
- Relatives: Sir Keith Macpherson Smith (brother)
- Awards: Knight Commander of the Order of the British Empire; Military Cross & Bar; Distinguished Flying Cross & Two Bars; Air Force Cross
- Aviation career
- Famous flights: Pioneer flight from Cairo to Calcutta; Pioneer flight from England to Australia
- Air force: Australian Flying Corps
- Battles: First World War; Gallipoli Campaign; Sinai and Palestine Campaign; Battle of Romani
- Rank: Captain

Sir Ross Macpherson Smith, KBE, MC & Bar, DFC & Two Bars, AFC (4 December 1892 – 13 April 1922) was an Australian aviator. He and his brother, Sir Keith Macpherson Smith, were the first pilots to fly from England to Australia, in 1919.

== Early life ==
Smith's father migrated to Western Australia from Scotland and became a pastoralist in South Australia. His mother was born near New Norcia, Western Australia, the daughter of a pioneer from Scotland. The boys boarded at Queen's School, North Adelaide, and for two years at Warriston School, at Moffat in Scotland.

== Military service ==
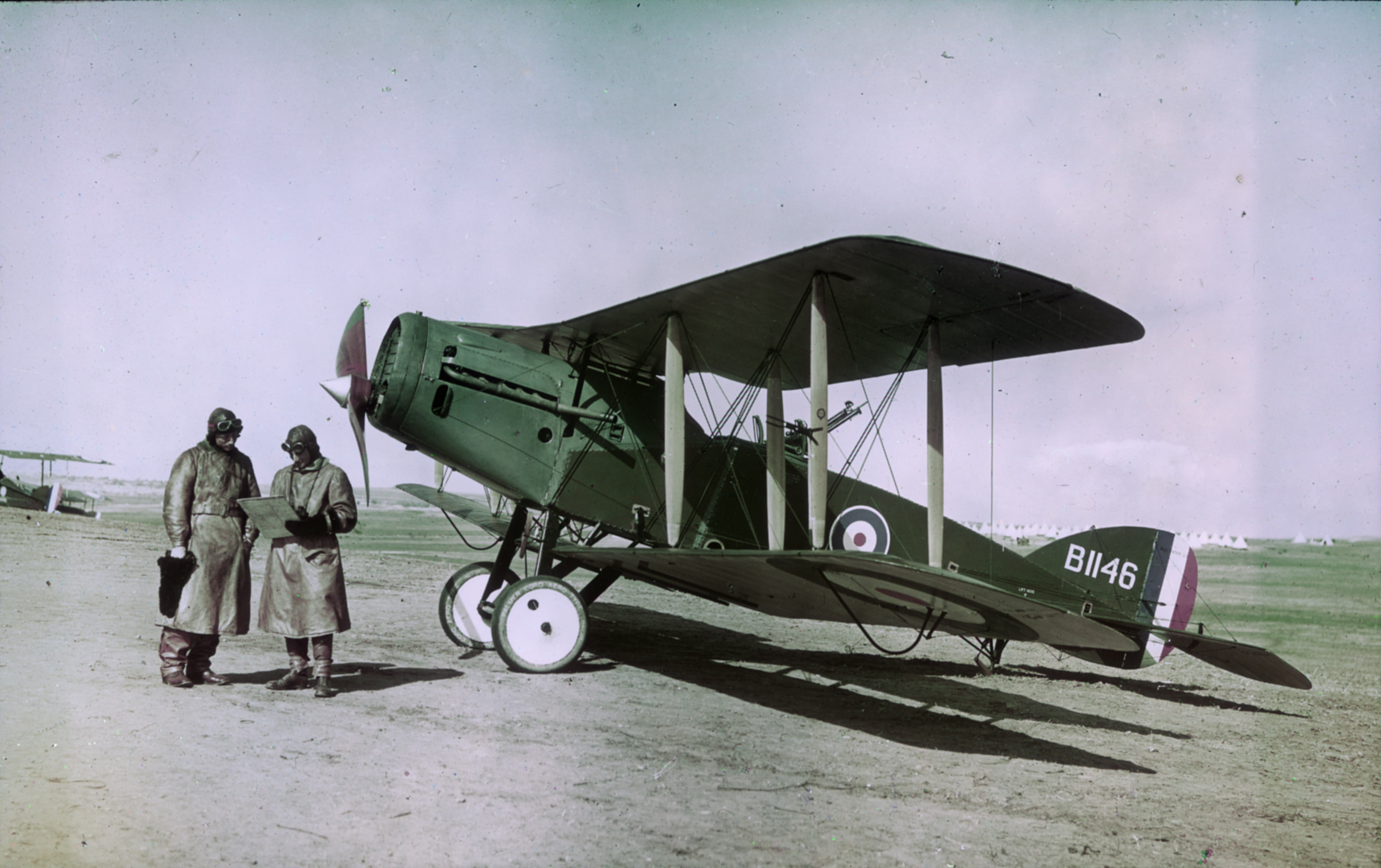
Capt. Ross Smith (left) and observer with their Bristol F.2B Fighter, in Palestine, February 1918.

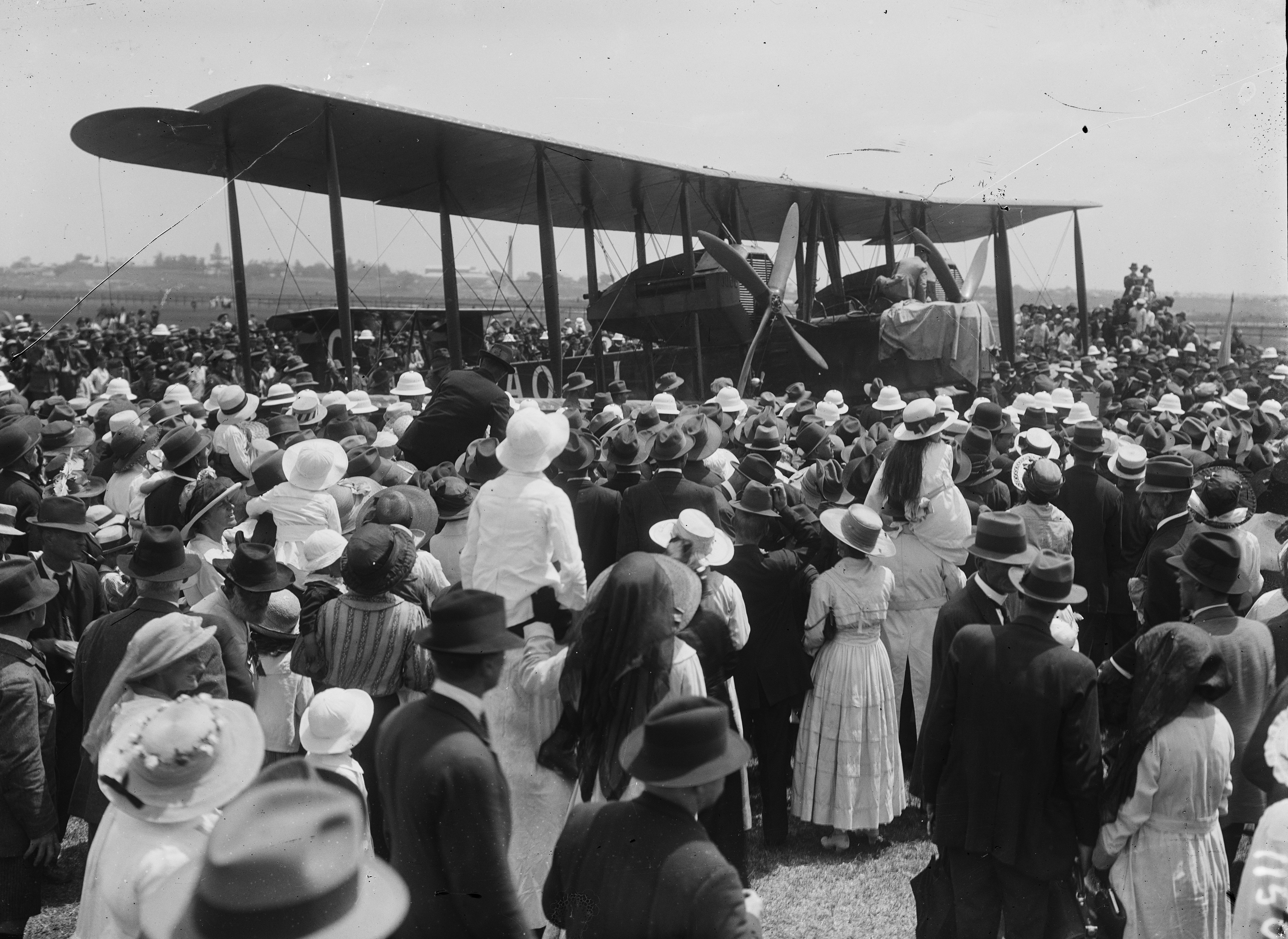
Ross and Keith Smith, Mascot, Sydney, 1920

Smith enlisted in 1914 in the 3rd Light Horse Regiment, landing at Gallipoli 13 May 1915. In 1917, he volunteered for the Australian Flying Corps. He was later twice awarded the Military Cross and the Distinguished Flying Cross three times, becoming an air ace with 11 confirmed aerial victories.

Smith was pilot for T. E. Lawrence (Lawrence of Arabia) and fought in aerial combat missions in the Middle East. He is mentioned several times in Lawrence's book, Seven Pillars of Wisdom, Chapter 114.

== The Great Air Race ==
In 1919 the Australian government offered a prize of £A10,000 for the first Australians in a British aircraft to fly from Great Britain to Australia. Smith and his brother Keith, Sergeant James Mallett (Jim) Bennett and Sergeant Wally Shiers, flew from Hounslow Heath Aerodrome, England on 12 November 1919 in a Vickers Vimy, eventually landing in Darwin Australia on 10 December, taking less than 28 days, with actual flying time of 135 hours. The four men shared the £10,000 prize money put forward by the Australian government.

== Later life ==
Smith was killed (along with the recently commissioned Lieutenant Bennett) while testing a Vickers Viking IV amphibian aircraft which crashed in Byfleet soon after taking off from Brooklands on 13 April 1922. The same aircraft type had also killed John Alcock, another World War I veteran and pioneering long-distance aviator. Captain Stanley Cockerell, test pilot for Vickers, had flown Smith and Bennett as passengers on the aircraft's maiden flight earlier that day and testified to the inquest that the machine seemed to be in perfect working order. The jury returned a verdict of death by misadventure. The bodies were transported to Australia and Smith was given a state funeral and later buried on 14 June at the North Road Cemetery, Adelaide.

== Legacy ==
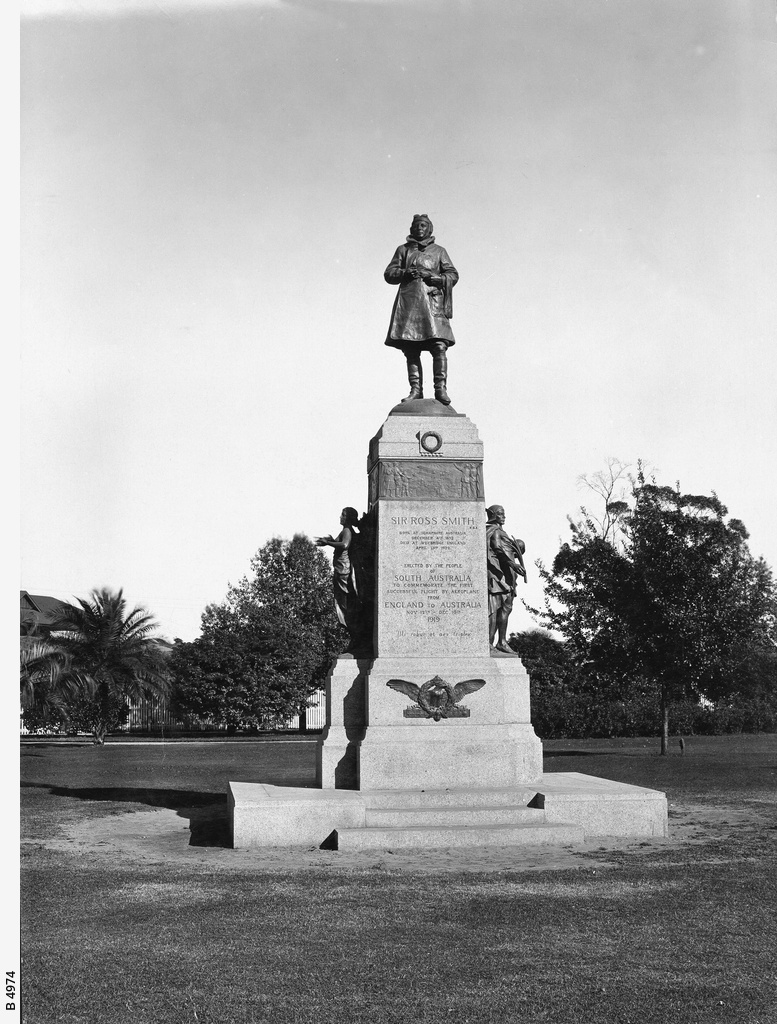
Sir Ross Smith memorial statue in Creswell Gardens, Adelaide

The Australian cricketer Keith Ross Miller (born 28 November 1919) was named after Smith and his brother.

Ross Smith Avenue in the Darwin suburb of Parap is on the alignment of the airstrip that completed the journey from England to Australia. Their aircraft is preserved at Adelaide Airport. There is a statue of him near Adelaide Oval.

A part-ring road around Sydney Airport was also named Ross Smith Avenue, which connects the Domestic Terminal with the control tower and the general aviation area.

Sir Ross Smith Boulevard in the Adelaide suburb of Oakden was named after Smith.
