= Keith Macpherson Smith =

Australian aviator (1890–1955)

Sir Keith Smith
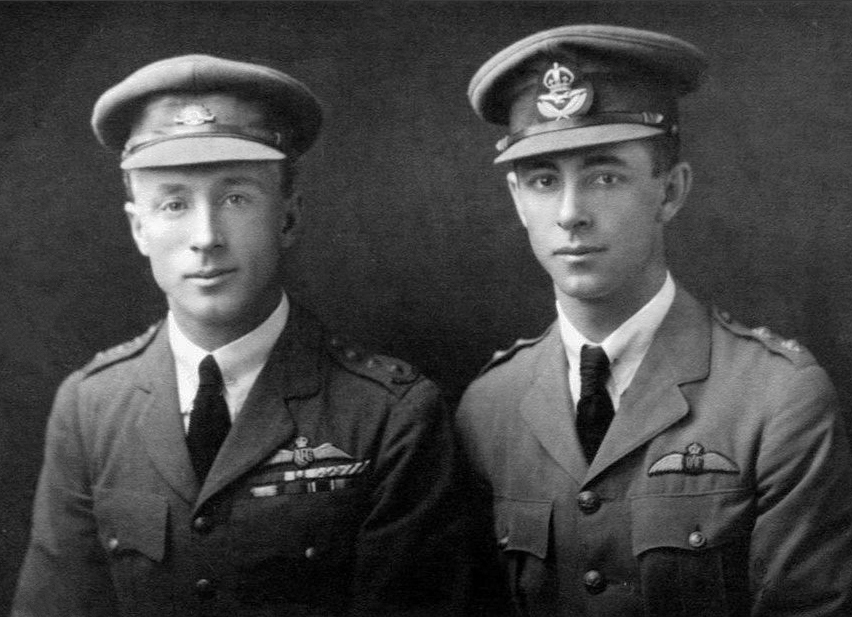
- Capt. Ross (left) and Lieut. Keith (right) Smith in 1921.
- Born: Sir Keith Macpherson Smith; 20 December 1890; Adelaide
- Died: 19 December 1955 (aged 64); Sydney
- Known for: First flight from England to Australia
- Relatives: Sir Ross Macpherson Smith (brother)
- Awards: Knight Commander of the Order of the British Empire
- Aviation career
- Famous flights: The Great Air Race
- Air force: Australian Flying Corps
- Battles: World War I
- Rank: Lieutenant

Sir Keith Macpherson Smith, KBE (20 December 1890 – 19 December 1955) was an Australian aviator, who, along with his brother, Sir Ross Macpherson Smith, Sergeant James Mallett (Jim) Bennett and Sergeant Walter (Wally) Shiers, became the first people to fly from England to Australia.

== Early life ==
Smith's father emigrated from Scotland to Western Australia, and later became a pastoralist in South Australia. His mother was born in Western Australia, daughter of a Scottish pioneer. Both boys boarded at Queen's School, North Adelaide, and for two years at Warriston School, in Scotland.

He was medically unfit to join the First Australian Imperial Force but was accepted into the Royal Flying Corps and Royal Air Force as a pilot between 1917 and 1919.

== The Great Air Race ==
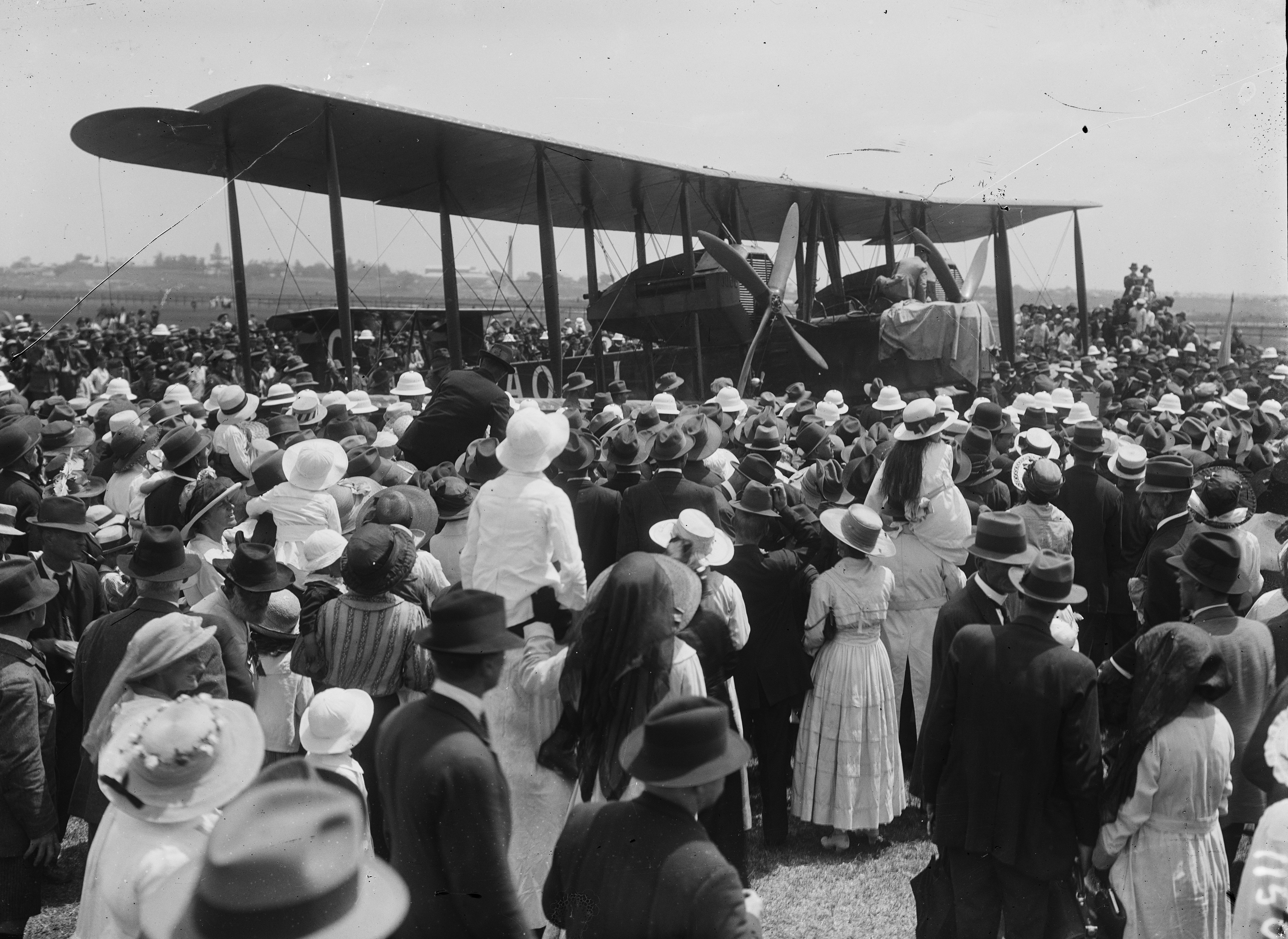
Ross and Keith Smith, Mascot, Sydney, 1920

In 1919 the Australian government offered a prize of £A10,000 for the first Australians in a British aircraft to fly from Great Britain to Australia. On 12 November 1919, the brothers, along with Sergeant Jim Bennett and Sergeant Wally Shiers, departed from Hounslow Heath Aerodrome, England, in a Vickers Vimy aeroplane, eventually landing in Darwin, Australia on 10 December, having taken less than 28 days with an actual flying time of 135 hours. The four men shared the £10,000 prize money. Keith and Ross Smith were immediately knighted, while Shiers and Bennett were commissioned and each awarded a Bar to their Air Force Medals.

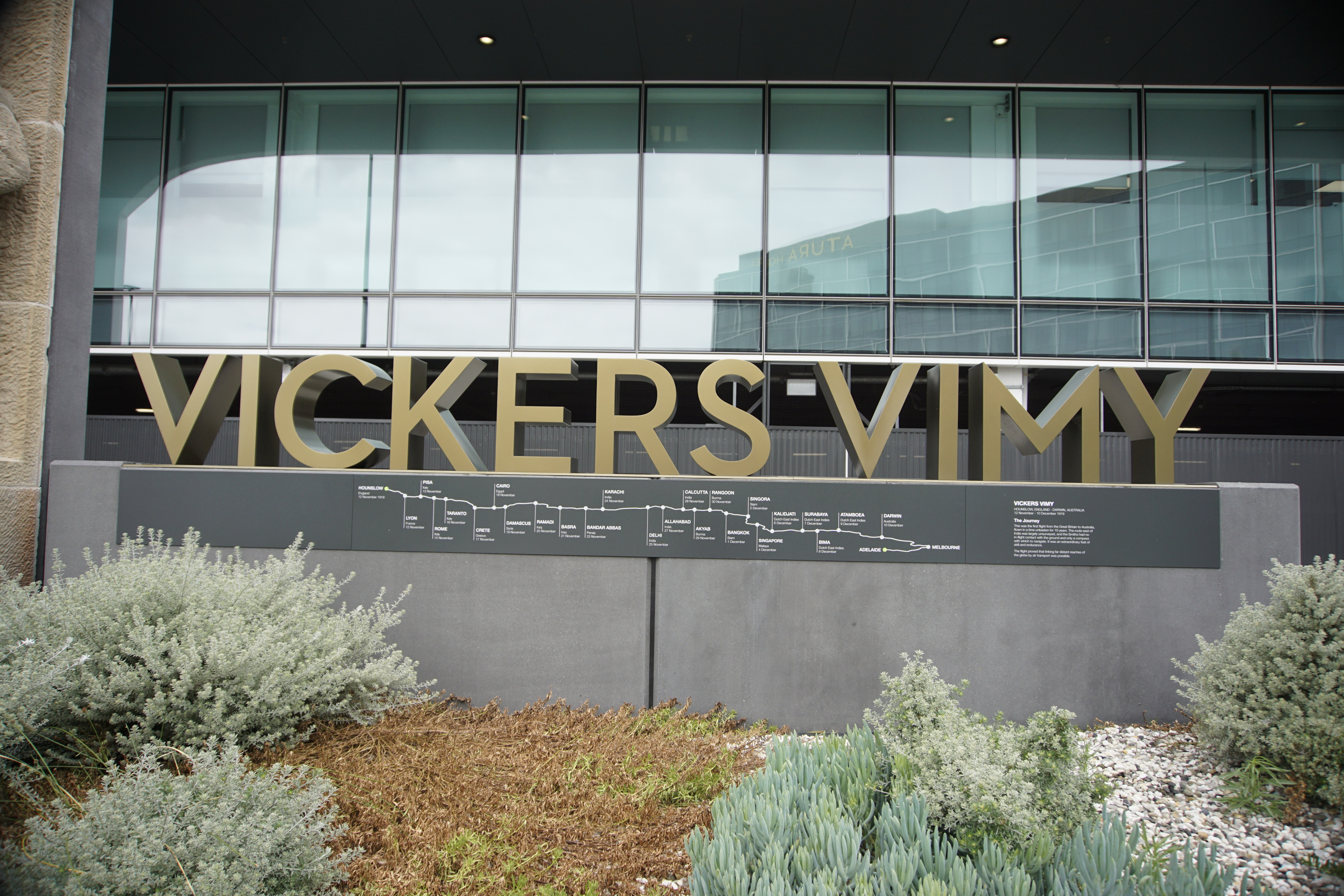

The aircraft is preserved in a museum at the Adelaide Airport in South Australia.

== Later life ==
Smith planned an around-the-world flight in 1922, but abandoned it after his brother Ross was killed during a test flight. He then lived and worked in Sydney as an agent for Vickers, vice-president of British Commonwealth Pacific Airlines (taken over by Qantas in 1954), and as a director of Qantas Empire Airways and Tasman Empire Airways Limited (a subsidiary of Imperial Airways which was the forerunner of British Airways).

Smith unsuccessfully stood for preselection as the Nationalist Party candidate at the 1931 East Sydney by-election. He died on 19 December 1955.
