= 1946 New Year Honours =

British royal recognitions

The 1946 New Year Honours were appointments by many of the Commonwealth Realms of King George VI to various orders and honours to reward and highlight good works by citizens of those countries, and to celebrate the passing of 1945 and the beginning of 1946. They were announced on 1 January 1946 for the United Kingdom, and Dominions, Canada, the Union of South Africa, and New Zealand.

The recipients of honours are displayed here as they were styled before their new honour, and arranged by honour, with classes (Knight, Knight Grand Cross, etc.) and then divisions (Military, Civil, etc.) as appropriate. Peerages were only awarded in the United Kingdom and, for peerages of Viscount (higher) and Baron (lower), automatically gave the right to sit in the House of Lords and vote on legislation. Included are appointments to the Privy Council, which is a formal body of advisers to the Sovereign of the United Kingdom.

== United Kingdom and Colonies ==
=== Viscount ===
- Field-Marshal the Right Honourable Alan Francis, Baron Alanbrooke, GCB, DSO, Aide-de-Camp General to the King.
- Field-Marshal the Honourable Sir Harold Rupert Leofric George Alexander, GCB, CSI, DSO, MC, Aide-de-Camp General to the King.
- Admiral of the Fleet the Right Honourable Andrew Browne, Baron Cunningham of Hyndhope, KT, GCB, DSO.
- Field-Marshal Sir Bernard Law Montgomery, GCB, DSO.
- Marshal of the Royal Air Force the Right Honourable Charles Frederick Algernon, Baron Portal of Hungerford, GCB, DSO, MC.
- The Right Honourable Julius Salter, Baron Southwood, Chairman, Odhams Press Ltd. Chairman of the Red Cross Penny-a-Week Committee of HRH The Duke of Gloucester's Fund. For political and public services.

=== Baron ===
- Admiral Sir Bruce Austin Fraser, GCB, KBE.
- Marshal of the Royal Air Force Sir Arthur William Tedder, GCB.
- Admiral of the Fleet Sir John Cronyn Tovey, GCB, KBE, DSO, First and Principal Naval Aide-de-Camp to the King.
- Field-Marshal Sir Henry Maitland Wilson, GCB, GBE, DSO, Aide-de-Camp General to the King.
- Colin Frederick Campbell, JP, President of the British Bankers' Association. Chairman of the Committee of the London Clearing Bank, and of the National Provincial Bank, Ltd.
- John Percival Davies. For political and public services in Lancashire.
- Philip Albert Inman, JP, Chairman, Charing Cross Hospital. For political and public services.

=== Privy Counsellors ===
- The Honourable John Albert Beasley, Minister for Defence and Acting Attorney-General, Commonwealth of Australia.
- Sir Travers (The Honourable Mr. Justice) Humphreys, a Judge of His Majesty's High Court of Justice since 1928.
- The Honourable James Lorimer Ilsley, KC, Minister of Finance, Canada.
- Bill Jordan, High Commissioner for New Zealand in the United Kingdom.
- The Honourable Walter Nash, Minister of Finance and Customs, New Zealand.
- The Honourable Louis Stephen St. Laurent, KC, Minister of Justice and Attorney-General, Canada.

=== Knight Bachelor ===
- Major-General Ralph Bignell Ainsworth, CB, DSO, OBE, MRCS, LRCP, Director of Medical Services, Joint War Organisation of the British Red Cross Society and Order of St. John.
- Wallace Alan Akers, CBE, Director of Atomic Bomb Research, Department of Scientific and Industrial Research.
- Donald Coleman Bailey, OBE, AMInstCE, Acting Superintendent, Experimental Bridging Establishment, Ministry of Supply.
- William Thomas Bailey, President of the Newspaper Society.
- William Valentine Ball, OBE, Senior Master and King's Remembrancer, Supreme Court of Judicature.
- Harold Idris Bell, CB, OBE, For services to Classical and Welsh scholarship.
- Thomas Penberthy Bennett, CBE, FRIBA, lately Director of Works, Ministry of Works.
- Captain David William Bone, CBE, Commodore Master, Anchor Line Ltd.
- Francis Joseph Edwin Brake, MIEE, Controller of Construction and Regional Services, Ministry of Aircraft Production.
- Samuel Harold Brown, Lately Under-Secretary, Ministry of Aircraft Production.
- Major-General Kenneth Gray Buchanan, CB, CMG, DSO, Secretary, Council of Voluntary War Work.
- Roland Burrows, KC. For services to the Home Office.
- John James Cater, Chief Inspector of Taxes, Board of Inland Revenue.
- Geoffrey Edmund Cator, CMG, Malayan Agent in London. For services to the dependents of internees in the Far East.
- Robert Christopher Chance, JP, DL, Alderman, Carlisle County Borough.
- Captain William Arthur Charlton, DSC, Commodore Master, Furness Withy & Co. Ltd.
- George Perrin Christopher, Director, Commercial Services, Ministry of War Transport.
- Clive Forster-Cooper, ScD, FRS, Director of the British Museum (Natural History).
- John Herbert McCutcheon Craig, CB, Deputy Master and Controller, Royal Mint.
- Austin Earl, CB, CBE, Principal Assistant Under Secretary of State, War Office.
- Lawrence Edwards, MBE, JP, DL, lately Deputy Controller of Merchant Shipbuilding and Repairs, Admiralty.
- Professor Charles Drummond Ellis, PhD, FRS, Scientific Adviser to the Army Council.
- Hubert Bryan Heath Eves, Chairman, Tanker Tonnage Committee, Petroleum Board. Deputy Chairman, Anglo-Iranian Oil Company.
- Harold Arthur Thomas Fairbank, DSO, OBE, MB, MS, FRCS, Consultant Adviser in Orthopaedic Surgery, Ministry of Health Emergency Medical Service.
- John Robinson Felton, OBE, HM Chief Inspector of Mines, Ministry of Fuel and Power.
- Arthur Frederic Brownlow fforde, lately Under-Secretary, HM Treasury.
- Paul Gordon Fildes, OBE, MB, FRS, Director of Chemical Bacteriology, Medical Research Council.
- Douglas Stuart Gibbon, MC, Chief Taxing Master of the Supreme Court of Judicature.
- Charles Frederick Goodeve, OBE, DSc, FRS, Deputy Controller, Research and Development, Admiralty.
- John Gibson Graham, MC, lately Chief Representative of the Ministry of War Transport in the Mediterranean.
- Archibald Montague Henry Gray, CBE, MD, FRCP, FRCS, Dermatologist, University College Hospital. For special war services.
- William Reginald Halliday, LLD, Principal, King's College, London.
- Professor Ian Morris Heilbron, DSO, DSc, LLD, FRS, lately Scientific Adviser, Ministry of Production.
- John Richard Hobhouse, MC, JP, Regional Shipping Representative for North West England, Ministry of War Transport.
- Lieutenant-Colonel Herbert Patrick Hunter, CBE, Chief Constable of Staffordshire.
- Norman Victor Kipping, JP, lately Head of the Regional Division, Ministry of Production.
- Cyril Leigh Macrae Langham, Solicitor, Ministry of Labour and National Service.
- Eric Cyril Egerton Leadbitter, CVO, Clerk in Ordinary of His Majesty's Most Honourable Privy Council.
- Herman Andrew Harris Lebus, CBE, JP, lately Adviser on utility furniture to the Board of Trade.
- Major Robert Leighton, lately President of the British Federation of Master Printers.
- Gerald Lenanton, Director, Home Timber Production Department, Ministry of Supply.
- Benny Lockspeiser, FRAcS, Director of Scientific Research, Ministry of Aircraft Production.
- Arthur Macdonald, JP, Honorary Treasurer, Durham Aged Mineworkers' Association. General Manager, Co-operative Wholesale Society, Ltd, Bankers, Manchester.
- William Lennox McNair, KC, Legal Adviser to the Ministry of War Transport.
- Colonel Wilfrid Martineau, MC, TD, lately Chairman, Emergency Committee, City of Birmingham.
- John Robertson Masson, lately Chief Representative of the Ministry of War Transport in India.
- Frank Charles Mears, LLD, FRIBA, FRSE, President of the Royal Scottish Academy.
- Francis Meredith Meynell, Adviser on Consumer Needs to the Board of Trade.
- Commander Edward Robert Micklem, CBE, Royal Navy (Retd.), Deputy Chairman, Vickers-Armstrongs Ltd.
- John Mollett, Director of Potatoes and Carrots, Ministry of Food.
- Charles Norman Nixon, Governor of the National Bank of Egypt.
- Charles Eric Palmer, JP, DL, Chairman, Cake and Biscuit Manufacturers War-time Alliance.
- Harold Parkinson, OBE, Vice-Chairman, National Savings Committee.
- Leonard Cecil Paton, CBE, MC, Commercial Managing Director, United Kingdom Commercial Corporation.
- Ralegh Buller Phillpotts, JP, Chairman, British Tabulating Machine Company.
- William Robinson, JP, lately Chairman of the Administrators for the City of Belfast.
- Martin Pearson Roseveare, Senior Chief Inspector, Ministry of Education.
- Bertram Thomas Rumble, Honorary Secretary and Treasurer, Appeals Committee, Royal Air Force Benevolent Fund.
- David Russell, LLD, FRSE, FSA, JP, Chancellor's Assessor, St. Andrew's University.
- Edward James Salisbury, CBE, DSc, FRS, Director of the Royal Botanic Gardens, Kew.
- Alexander Morris Carr-Saunders, Director of the London School of Economics and Political Science.
- William Dalgleish Scott, CBE, Permanent Secretary, Ministry of Finance, and official Head of HM Civil Service, Northern Ireland.
- James Dyer Simpson, JP, lately Chairman, British Insurance Association.
- Frank Ewart Smith, MIMechE, Chief Engineer and Superintendent, Armament Design Department, Ministry of Supply.
- Colonel Gilbertson Smith, TD, DL, Chairman, Essex County Council. For services to Civil Defence.
- William George Verdon Smith, CBE, Chairman, Bristol Aeroplane Co. Ltd.
- Thomas George Spencer, MIEE, Managing Director, Standard Telephones & Cables Ltd.
- Alexander Murray Stephen, MC, Chairman, Alexander Stephen & Sons, Shipbuilders and Engineers, Glasgow.
- Harold Augustine Tempany, CMG, CBE, DSc, FRIC, Agricultural Adviser to the Secretary of State for the Colonies.
- Percy Edward Thomas, OBE, LLD, JP, President of the Royal Institute of British Architects.
- Lieutenant-Colonel Reginald Aneurin Thomas, CBE, HM Chief Inspector of Explosives, Home Office.
- Theodore Eastaway Thomas, CBE, lately General Manager, London Passenger Transport Board.
- Major Robert Norman Thompson, Chairman Joseph L. Thompson & Sons, Ltd, Sunderland. For services to shipbuilding.
- John Mackay Thomson, CB, FRSE, Secretary, Scottish Education Department.
- Henry Samuel Edwin Turner, Director of Meat and Livestock, Ministry of Food.
- Stanley Unwin, LLD, Publisher. Chairman, Books and Periodicals Committee, British Council. For public services.
- Charles Geoffrey Vickers, VC, Director-General, Economic Intelligence Division, Foreign Office.
- Henry Wade, CMG, DSO, MD, FRCS(Ed.), Senior Visiting Surgeon, Bangour Emergency Hospital, West Lothian.
- George Rolande Percival Wall, MC, Deputy Secretary, Ministry of Food.
- James Arthur Wilson, CBE, Chief Constable of Cardiff. For services to Civil Defence.

Dominions

- Ralph Stuart Bond, CBE, Chairman of the Finance Committee, The Empire Societies' War Hospitality Committee.
- Frederick Lloyd Dumas. For public services in the State of South Australia.
- The Honourable Edward Wheewall Holden, MIE (Aust.), a Member of the Legislative Council, State of South Australia. For services to industry.

India

- The Honourable Mr. Justice Sidney Wadsworth, Indian Civil Service, Puisne Judge of the High Court of Judicature at Fort St. George, Madras.
- The Honourable Mr. Justice Rupendra Coomar Mitter, Puisne Judge of the High Court of Judicature at Fort William in Bengal.
- Robert Edwin Russell, CSI, CIE, Indian Civil Service, Adviser to His Excellency the Governor of Bihar.
- Ivon Hope Taunton, CIE, Indian Civil Service, Adviser to His Excellency the Governor of Bombay.
- Eric Cecil Ansorge, CSI, CIE, Indian Civil Service, Adviser to His Excellency the Governor of Bihar.
- John Sargent, CIE, Secretary to the Government of India in the Department of Education.
- Major Thomas Faulkner Borwick, CIE, DSO, Director-General, Ordnance Factories, Munitions Production Branch, Government of India.
- Herbert Ray Stewart, CIE, Indian Agricultural Service, Vice-Chairman, Imperial Council of Agricultural Research.
- Charles Francis Waterfall, CSI, CIE, Indian Civil Service, lately Chief Commissioner, Andaman and Nicobar Islands.
- Major-General Charles Offley Harvey, CB, CVO, CBE, MC, Military Adviser-in-Chief, Indian States Forces.
- George Eustace Cuffe, General Manager, Bombay, Baroda & Central India Railway, and lately Director-General of Railways (Calcutta Area), Calcutta.
- Percy William Marsh, CSI, CIE, Indian Civil Service (Retd.), Chairman, Punjab and North-West Frontier Province Joint Public Service Commission, Lahore, Punjab.
- John Thorne Masey Bennett, CIE, CBE, MC, Indian Police, Inspector-General of Police, Punjab, and Joint Secretary to Government, Home (Police) Department, Punjab.
- Clarmont Percival Skrine, OBE, Indian Political Service, His Britannic Majesty's Consul-General for Khorasan, Meshed.
- Harold George Dennehy, CSI, CIE, Indian Civil Service, Chief Secretary to the Government of Assam.
- Lieutenant-Colonel Alistair John Ransford, CIE, Royal Engineers, Mint Master, His Majesty's Mint, Bombay.
- Lieutenant-Colonel Desmond Fitz-John Fitzmaurice, CIE, Royal Engineers, Master, Security Printing, Government of India.
- Percy James Edmunds, CIE, Chief Engineer, Posts and Telegraphs, New Delhi.
- Lieutenant-Colonel Nilkanth Shriram Jatar, CIE, DSO, MRCS, LRCP, LMS, Indian Medical Service (Retd.), Inspector-General of Prisons, Central Provinces and Berar.
- John Brownson Greaves, CBE, lately member of the Bombay Legislative Assembly, Chairman, Greaves Cotton & Company, Sheriff of Bombay.
- Behram Naorosji Karanjia, lately member of the Bombay Legislative. Council, Businessman, Bombay.
- Frank Ware, CIE, FRCVS, Director of Animal Husbandry, United Provinces.
- Major Nawab Muhammad Jamshed Ali Khan, MBE, lately member of the United Provinces Legislative Assembly, Zamindar of Baghpat, Meerut District, United Provinces.
- Lieutenant-Colonel Sahib Singh Sokhey, Indian Medical Service, Director, Haffkine Institute, Bombay.
- Kottaiyur Veerappa Alagappa Ramanatha Alagappa Chettiar, PhD, LLD, DLitt, Barrister-at-Law, Banker and Mill-owner, Madras.
- Amatyasiromanti Trichinopoly Thumboo Chetty, OBE, Private Secretary to His Highness the Maharaja of Mysore.
- Nawab Ghaibi Khan (walad Muhammad Khan Chandio), Ghaibidero, Taluka Kambar, Larkana District, Sind.
- Sardar Bahadur Indra Singh, Managing Director, Messrs. Indian Steel & Wire Products Limited, Calcutta.
- Sardar Surendra Singh Maiithia, Managing Proprietor, Saraya Sugar Factory, Sardar Nagar, Gorkahpur District, United Provinces.

Colonies, Protectorates, Etc.

- Albert Ernest De Silva. For public services in Ceylon.
- Errol Lionel Dos Santos. Financial Secretary, Trinidad.
- Horace Hector Hearne, Colonial Legal Service, Chief Justice of Jamaica.
- Lim Han Hoe, CBE. For public services in the Straits Settlements.
- Carleton George Langley, Colonial Legal Service, Chief Justice of British Honduras.
- Philippe Raffray, CBE. For public services in Mauritius.
- Alfred Vincent. For public services in Kenya.

=== Order of the Bath ===
==== Knight Grand Cross of the Order of the Bath (GCB) ====
Military Division

Royal Navy

- Admiral Sir John Henry Dacres Cunningham, KCB, MVO.
- Admiral Sir Henry Ruthven Moore, KCB, CVO, DSO.

Army

- General Sir Ronald Forbes Adam, Bt, KCB, DSO, OBE, (1632), late Royal Regiment of Artillery, Colonel Commandant, Royal Artillery and Army Educational Corps.
- General Sir Bernard Charles Tolver Paget, KCB, DSO, MC, (4112), late The Oxfordshire and Buckinghamshire Light Infantry, Colonel Commandant, Reconnaissance Corps, and Intelligence Corps, Aide-de-Camp to The King.
- General Sir Thomas Sheridan Riddell-Webster, KCB, DSO, (1505), late The Cameronians (Scottish Rifles).

Royal Air Force

- Air Chief Marshal Sir William Sholto Douglas, KCB, MC, DFC.
- Air Chief Marshal Sir Edgar Rainey Ludlow-Hewitt, GBE, KCB, CMG, DSO, MC, ADC, (Retd).

Civil Division

- Sir Cyril William Hurcomb, KCB, KBE, Director-General, Ministry of War Transport.
- His Highness Maharaja Sir Sri Jaya Chamaraja-Wadiyar Bahadur, GCSI, Maharaja of Mysore.
- Sir Arthur William Street, KCB, KBE, CMG, CIE, MC, Permanent Under-Secretary of State, Air Ministry 1939–45. (Now Acting Permanent Secretary, Office of the Control Commission, Germany and Austria.)

==== Knight Commander of the Order of the Bath (KCB) ====
Military Division

Royal Navy

- Vice-Admiral Arthur Malcolm Peters, CB, DSC.
- Vice-Admiral Harold Thomas Courtland Walker, CB.
- Vice-Admiral Clement Moody, CB.
- Engineer Vice-Admiral John Kingcome, CB.

Army

- Lieutenant-General Sir Archibald Edward Nye, KBE, CB, MC, (5851), late The Royal Warwickshire Regiment.
- General Sir Edward Pellew Quinan, KCIE, CB, DSO, OBE, Indian Army (Retd).

Royal Air Force

- Air Vice-Marshal Alan Lees, CB, CBE, DSO, AFC.
- Acting Air Vice-Marshal John Walter Cordingley, CB, CBE.

Civil Division

- Colonel Sir Henry Davies Foster MacGeagh, KBE, TD, KC, Judge Advocate-General of the Forces.
- Colonel Frank Garrett, CB, CBE, TD, Chairman, Territorial Army Association of the County of Suffolk.
- Norman Craven Brook, CB, Additional Secretary of the Cabinet.
- Sir Godfrey Herbert Ince, KBE, CB, Permanent Secretary, Ministry of Labour and National Service.
- Sir Robert John Sinclair, KBE, lately Chief Executive, Ministry of Production. (Now Chief Executive, Board of Trade.)
- Sir Donald Edward Vandepeer, KBE, Permanent Secretary, Ministry of Agriculture and Fisheries.

==== Companion of the Order of the Bath (CB) ====
Military Division

Royal Navy

- Rear-Admiral John William Ashley Waller.
- Rear-Admiral Reginald Henry Portal, DSC.
- Rear-Admiral Piers Keane Kekewich (Retd).
- Rear-Admiral (E) John Leigh Bedale.
- Rear-Admiral (E) Bernard Wilberforce Greathead.
- Rear-Admiral (S) Noel Wright, OBE, (Retd).
- Rear-Admiral (S) Richard Arthur Hawkesworth, OBE, (Retd).
- Surgeon Rear-Admiral Albert Edward Malone, MB, BCh, DPH.
- Acting Major-General Reginald Alexander Dallas Brooks, CMG, DSO, Royal Marines.
- Captain (Commodore 1st Class) Edward Malcolm Evans-Lombe.
- Captain (Acting Rear-Admiral) Matthew Sausse Slattery.

Army

- Major-General Arthur Branston Austin (15744), late Army Dental Corps, Honorary Dental Surgeon to The King.
- Major-General (temporary) John Arthur Mallock Bond, CBE, VD, (63454), General List, Cavalry.
- Major-General (temporary) William Pat Arthur Bradshaw, DSO, (22511), late Foot Guards.
- Major-General (temporary) Walter Joseph Cawthorn, CIE, CBE, 16th Punjab Regiment, Indian Army.
- Major-General (temporary) Evelyn Dalrymple Fanshawe, CBE, (9530), late The Queen's Bays (2nd Dragoon Guards), Royal Armoured Corps.
- Brigadier (temporary) John LeClerc Fowle, CIE, late Royal Indian Army Service Corps.
- Major-General Alexander Galloway, CBE, DSO, MC, late Infantry.
- Brigadier (temporary) George Alexander Kelly (4675), late Royal Army Veterinary Corps.
- Major-General (temporary) Alec Wilfred Lee, MC, (22040), late Infantry.
- Major-General (temporary) Ross Cairns McCay, CBE, DSO, Indian Army.
- Major-General David Carmichael Monro, CBE, MB, FRCS (Edin.), (14493), late Royal Army Medical Corps, Honorary Surgeon to The King.
- Major-General (temporary) Alan John Keefe Pigott, CBE, (6614), late Infantry.
- Major-General (temporary) John Talbot Wentworth Reeve, CBE, DSO, (14839), late Royal Regiment of Artillery.
- Major-General (temporary) Sydney Fairbairn Rowell, CBE, Australian Military Forces.
- Major-General (temporary) George Neville Russell, CBE, (6072), late Corps of Royal Engineers.
- Major-General Reginald George Stanham (19499), Royal Army Pay Corps.
- Major-General (temporary) Douglas Stuart, CIE, OBE, late Infantry, Indian Army.
- Major-General (temporary) Robert Hallam Studdert, DSO, MC, (12232), late Royal Regiment of Artillery.
- Major-General Treffry Owen Thomson, CBE, (4850), late Royal Army Medical Corps, Honorary Physician to The King.
- Major-General (acting) Peter Alfred Ullman, OBE, (13319), late Corps of Royal Engineers.
- Major-General (temporary) Charles Brian Wainwright, (18120), late Royal Regiment of Artillery.
- Major-General (temporary) Walter David Abbott Williams, CBE, BA, (21149), late Corps of Royal Engineers.
- Major-General (temporary) Edward Ambrose Woods, CBE, MC, (15076), late Royal Regiment of Artillery.

Royal Air Force

- Air Vice-Marshal Geoffrey Hill Ambler, CBE, AFC, Auxiliary Air Force.
- Air Vice-Marshal Francis Joseph Fogarty, DFC, AFC.
- Air Vice-Marshal Alan Filmer Rook, OBE, FRCP, MRCS, DPH, KHP.
- Acting Air Vice-Marshal Robert Stewart Blucke, CBE, DSO, AFC.
- Acting Air Vice-Marshal Dermot Alexander Boyle, CBE, AFC.
- Acting Air Vice-Marshal Hugh Alex Constantine, CBE, DSO.
- Acting Air Vice-Marshal Ernest John Cuckney, CBE, DSC.
- Acting Air Vice-Marshal Gilbert Harcourt-Smith, CBE, MVO.
- Acting Air Vice-Marshal Francis Frederic Inglis, CBE.
- Acting Air Vice-Marshal Albert Frank Lang, MBE, AFC.
- Acting Air Vice-Marshal Colin Winterbotham Weedon, CBE.
- Acting Air Vice-Marshal John Rene Whitley, CBE, DSO, AFC.
- Acting Air Vice-Marshal William Munro Yool, CBE.
- Air Commodore George Gaywood Banting, CBE.
- Air Commodore Allan Hesketh, CBE, DFC.
- Air Commodore Herbert William Heslop, OBE.
- Air Commodore George Stacey Hodson, CBE, AFC.
- Air Commodore Harold Douglas Jackman, CBE.
- Air Commodore John Lawrence Kirby, CBE.
- Air Commodore Francis William Long.
- Air Commodore Harold Jace Roach, CBE, AFC.
- Air Commodore Charles Gainer Smith, CBE.
- Air Commodore Gilbert Formby Smylie, DSC.
- Air Commodore Cecil George Wigglesworth, AFC.
- Air Commodore Harry Leonard Woolveridge, OBE.
- Acting Air Commodore Norman Stuart Allinson.
- Acting Air Commodore Francis Robert Banks, OBE.
- Acting Air Commodore Clayton Descou Clement Boyce, CBE.
- Acting Air Commodore Reginald Byrne, MC.
- Acting Air Commodore Henry Iliffe Cozens, AFC.
- Acting Air Commodore Edward Hedley Fielden, CVO, DFC, AFC.
- Acting Air Commodore Leslie Gordon Harvey.
- Acting Air Commodore Ronald Beresford Lees, CBE, DFC, ADC.
- Acting Air Commodore James Richard Mutch.
- Acting Air Commodore Noel Stephen Paynter.
- Acting Air Commodore Thomas Geoffrey Pike, CBE, DFC.
- Acting Air Commodore Laurence Frank Sinclair, GC, CBE, DSO, ADC.
- Acting Air Commodore Frank Woolley, OBE, DFC.
- Group Captain Frederick Charles Victor Laws, CBE.

Civil Division

- Lawrence Collingwood Williamson.
- Frederick Brundrett, BA. Royal Naval Scientific Service
- Colonel Sir Charles Leyshon Dillwyn-Venables-Llewelyn, Bt., President and Chairman, Territorial Army Association of the County of Radnor.
- Colonel Geoffry Christie-Miller, DSO, MC, TD, Chairman, Territorial Army and Air Force Association of the County of Chester.
- Lieutenant-Colonel Sir Graham Percival Heywood, Bt, DSO, TD, Chairman, Territorial Army Association of the County of Stafford.
- Colonel Harry Storey Tawse, TD, Chairman, Territorial Army and Air Force Association of the City of Aberdeen.
- Colonel Henry Cecil Lloyd Howard, CMG, DSO, Chairman, Territorial Army Association of the County of Flint.
- Solly Zuckerman, Scientific Director, Royal Air Force Bombing Analysis Unit. In recognition of distinguished service.
- Reginald Victor Jones, Assistant Director of Intelligence (Science), Air Ministry. In recognition of distinguished service.
- Sidney Alfred Bailey, MBE, Principal Assistant Secretary, Ministry of War Transport.
- Rex George Bennett, Director, Contracts Department, General Post Office.
- Maurice Joseph Dean, Principal Assistant Under Secretary of State, Air Ministry.
- Ernest Rowe-Dutton, CMG, Principal Assistant Secretary, HM Treasury.
- John James William Handford, OBE, Assistant Under-Secretary of State, Scottish Office.
- Colonel Lawrence Whitaker Harrison, DSO, MB, ChB, FRCP.(Ed.), Medical Officer, Ministry of Health.
- Arthur Sydney Hutchinson, CVO, Assistant Under-Secretary of State, Home Office.
- Alexander Johnston, Principal Assistant Secretary, Privy Council Office.
- Harold Simcox Kent, Parliamentary Counsel.
- John Vivian Kitto, CBE, Librarian, House of Commons.
- Rouxville Mark Lowe, Chief Land Registrar, HM Land Registry.
- Alexander Richardson McBain, OBE, Principal Assistant Secretary, Ministry of Supply.
- Edwin Henry Simon Marker, Principal Assistant Secretary, Board of Trade.
- Frank Cyril Musgrave, Principal Assistant Secretary, Ministry of Aircraft Production.
- Thomas Leslie Rowan, Principal Private Secretary to the Prime Minister.
- Robert William Arney Speed, Principal Assistant Solicitor, Office of HM Procurator-General and Treasury Solicitor.
- Rear-Admiral George Pirie Thomson, CBE, Royal Navy (Retd.), lately Chief Press Censor, Ministry of Information.
- David Philip Walsh, Principal Assistant Secretary, Admiralty.
- Arton Wilson, Principal Assistant Secretary, Ministry of Labour and National Service.

=== Order of Merit (OM) ===
- The Right Honourable Winston Leonard Spencer-Churchill, CH, FRS, MP.
- Marshal of the Royal Air Force The Right Honourable Charles Frederick Algernon, Baron Portal of Hungerford, GCB, DSO, MC.

=== Order of the Star of India ===
==== Knight Grand Commander of the Order of the Star of India (GCSI) ====
- Lieutenant-Colonel His Highness Maharaja Mukhtar-ul-Mulk, Asim-ul-Iqtidar, Rafi-ush-Shan, Wala Shikoh Mohta-Sham-i-Dauran, Umdat-ul-Umra, Maharajadhi-Raja Alijah Hisam-us-Sultanat, Sir George Jivaji Rao Scindia Bahadur, Shrinath, Mansur-i-Zaman, Fidwi-i-Haz-Rat-i-Malik-i-Muazzam-i-Rafi-ud-Darjat-i-Inglistan, GCIE, Maharaja of Gwalior.
- Lieutenant-Colonel His Highness Maharaja Sri Padmanabha Dasa Vanchi Pala Sir Bala Rama Varma Kulasekhara Kiritapati Manney Sultan Maharaja Raja Rama Raja Bahadur Shamshere Jang, GCIE, Maharaja of Travancore.

==== Knight Commander of the Order of the Star of India (KCSI) ====
- Captain His Highness Farzand-i-Arjmand Aqidat Paiwand-i-Daulat-i-Inglishia Barar Bans Sarmur, Raja-i-Rajagan, Maharaja Pratap Singh Malvendra Baha-Dur, Maharaja of Nabha.
- Lieutenant-Colonel Nawab Malik Khizar Hayat Khan Tiwana, OBE, Premier of the Punjab.
- Sir Geoffrey Pownall Burton, KCIE, Indian Civil Service, Financial Adviser to His Excellency the Governor of the Central Provinces and Berar.

==== Companion of the Order of the Star of India (CSI) ====
- Louis Reginald Fawcus, CIE, Indian Civil Service, Adviser to His Excellency the Governor of Bengal.
- Arthur de Coetlogan Williams, CIE, Indian Civil Service, Adviser to His Excellency the Governor of Bengal.
- Bhalchandra Krishna Gokhale, CIE, Indian Civil Service, Adviser to His Excellency the Governor of Orissa.
- Geoffrey Stephen Bozman, CIE, Indian Civil Service, Secretary to the Government of India in the Department of Information and Broadcasting.
- Lancelot Cecil Lepel Griffin, CIE, Indian Civil Service, Secretary to His Excellency the Crown Representative.
- Rabindra Nath Banerjee, CIE, Indian Civil Service, Secretary to the Government of India in the Commonwealth Relations Department.
- Alfred Charles Turner, CIE, MBE, Indian Civil Service, Financial Commissioner, Railways, India.
- Air Commodore (Acting Air Vice-Marshal) Malcolm Thomas, CBE, DFC, AFC, Air Officer Commanding, Royal Indian Air Force (Royal Air Force).
- Arthur Frederick William Dixon, CIE, Indian Civil Service, Member, Board of Revenue, Madras.
- Alexander Robert MacEwen, CIE, MC, Indian Civil Service, Member, Board of Revenue, Madras.
- Charles Beaupre Bell Clee, CIE, Indian Civil Service Revenue Commissioner for Sind and Secretary to Government, Revenue Department, Sind.
- Michael Henry Braddon Nethersole, CIE, DSO, Indian Civil Service, Commissioner, Rohilkhand Division, United Provinces.
- Ambrose Dundas Flux Dundas, CIE, Indian Political Service, Revenue and Divisional Commissioner, North-West Frontier Province.
- Harnam Das Bhanot, CIE, Indian Civil Service, Chief Secretary to Government, Punjab.
- Reginald Norman Marsh-Smith, CIE, Indian Police, Secretary to Government, Rationing Department, United Provinces.
- Edward William Perry, CIE, Indian Civil Service, Reconstruction Commissioner and Secretary to Government, Reconstruction Department, Bombay.
- William Norman Prentice Jenkin, CIE, Indian Police, Deputy Director, Intelligence Bureau, Home Department, Government of India.

=== Order of Saint Michael and Saint George ===
==== Knight Grand Cross of the Order of St Michael and St George (GCMG) ====
- Sir Harry Fagg Batterbee, KCMG, KCVO, lately United Kingdom High Commissioner in New Zealand.
- Sir Mark Aitchison Young, KCMG, Governor and Commander-in-Chief, Hong Kong.
- Sir Horace James Seymour, KCMG, CVO, His Majesty's Ambassador Extraordinary and Plenipotentiary at Chungking.

==== Knight Commander of the Order of St Michael and St George (KCMG) ====
- Major-General Colin McVean Gubbins, CMG, DSO, MC, Late Royal Artillery. For official services.
- William John Haley, Director-General, British Broadcasting Corporation.
- Peter Alexander Clutterbuck, CMG, MC, an Assistant Under-Secretary of State in the Dominions Office.
- Reginald Stuart Champion, CMG, OBE, Governor and Commander-in-Chief, Aden.
- Gerard Edward James Gent, CMG, OBE, DSO, MC, Assistant Under-Secretary of State, Colonial Office.
- William Lindsay Murphy, CMG, Governor and Commander-in-Chief, Bahamas.
- Francis Edward Evans, CMG, His Majesty's Consul-General at New York.
- Clifford John Norton, CMG, CVO, His Majesty's Envoy Extraordinary and Minister Plenipotentiary at Berne.
- Nigel Bruce Ronald, CMG, CVO, Assistant Under-Secretary of State in the Foreign Office.
- Ralph Clarmont Skrine Stevenson, CMG, His Majesty's Ambassador Extraordinary and Plenipotentiary at Belgrade.
- Professor Charles Kingsley Webster, MA, LittD, Adviser to the Foreign Office on United Nations Affairs.

==== Companion of the Order of St Michael and St George (CMG) ====
- Edgar Malpas Allen. Lately Representative of the Ministry of War Transport at Port Said.
- Harold John Channon, DSc. For services to Education.
- Geoffrey Balfour Hutchings. Lately Director-General of the British Ministry of Supply Commission in Paris.
- Colonel David Johnston Keswick, General Staff, War Office.
- Frank Godbould Lee, Deputy to the Representative of HM Treasury, Washington.
- John Gore Phillimore, Representative of HM Treasury and the Bank of England in South America.
- Curteis Fraser Maxwell Norwood Ryan, DSO, MC, Controller, Middle Eastern Services, Ministry of Information.
- Robert Jemmett Stopford, Economic Adviser to the Director of Civil Affairs, War Office.
- Herbert Tout. Lately Assistant Secretary, Board of Trade.
- Claud Humphrey Meredith Waldock, OBE, Principal Assistant Secretary, Admiralty.
- Hugh Thomas Weeks. Lately Head of The Programmes and Planning Division, Ministry of Production.
- William Henry Weightman, Assistant Secretary, General Post Office.
- Harold Wilkinson. Lately British Petroleum Representative in Washington.
- Joseph Robert McKenzie Willis, Assistant Secretary, Board of Inland Revenue.
- Norman Egerton Young, MC, Assistant Secretary, HM Treasury.
- Hugh Graham Wilkie, Indian Civil Service, Chief Secretary to the Government of Burma.
- Henry Seymour Baker, DSO, a Member of the House of Assembly, State of Tasmania. For public services.
- Alexander Mitchell Duncan, Chief Commissioner of Police, State of Victoria.
- Peter Douglas Hay Dunn, OBE, lately a Member of the Commission of Government, Newfoundland.
- Andrew Walker Fairley. For public and municipal services in the State of Victoria.
- Albert James Hannan, KC, Crown Solicitor and Solicitor for Railways, State of South Australia.
- Alexander Killen Macbeth, DSc, FRIC, Angus Professor of Chemistry, University of Adelaide, State of South Australia. For public services.
- Richard Gordon Munro, MC, Financial Adviser to the United Kingdom High Commissioner in Canada.
- Kenneth William Blackburne, Colonial Administrative Service, Administrative Secretary to the Comptroller for Development and Welfare, West Indies.
- Robert Boyd, Colonial Administrative Service, Director of Co-operation, Malaya.
- Kenneth Granville Bradley, Colonial Administrative Service, Colonial Secretary, Falkland Islands.
- John Vincent Cowgill, MC, Colonial Administrative Service, British Resident, Negri Sembilan.
- Arthur Harold Dickinson, OBE, Colonial Police Service, Inspector General of Police, Straits Settlements.
- Wilfred Jerome Farrell, OBE, MC, Colonial Education Service, Director of Education, Palestine.
- Major William Richard Gosling, OBE, Colonial Administrative Service, Provincial Commissioner, Gold Coast.
- Herbert Eric Jansz, Colonial Administrative Service, Commissioner of Lands, Ceylon.
- Norman Rowlstone Jarrett, Colonial Administrative Service, Food Controller, Malaya.
- Captain Vincent James Lynch, MC, Colonial Administrative Service, Under-Secretary, Gold Coast.
- Brigadier Charles Frederick Cunningham McCaskie, Deputy Governor and Chief Justice, British North Borneo.
- Brigadier David Mercer MacDougall, Colonial Administrative Service, Chief Civil Affairs Officer, Hong Kong.
- Robert Barr MacGregor, MB, ChB, MRCP, Colonial Medical Service, Director of Medical and Sanitary Services, Malaya.
- Brigadier Alexander Theodore Newboult, MC, Colonial Administrative Service, Deputy Chief Civil Affairs Staff Officer, Malaya.
- John Fearns Nicoll, Colonial Administrative Service, Colonial Secretary, Fiji.
- John O'Brien, Colonial Administrative Service, Provincial Commissioner, Zanzibar.
- Arthur Hilton Poynton, Assistant Secretary, Colonial Office.
- Raoul Rivet, MBE For public services in Mauritius.
- Sydney John Saint, OBE, Director of Agriculture, Barbados.
- John Biddulph Sidebotham, Assistant Secretary, Colonial Office.
- Ernest Rex Edward Surridge, Colonial Administrative Service, Deputy Chief Secretary, Kenya.
- Captain Eric Westbury Thompstone, MC, Colonial Administrative Seivice, Senior Resident, Nigeria.
- Roland Welensky. For public services in Northern Rhodesia.
- Brigadier Harold Curwen Willan, MC, Colonial Legal Service, Malaya.
- Ewen Campbell, MBE, MC, Provincial Governor, Sudan Political Service.
- Henry Ashley Clarke, Minister at His Majesty's Embassy in Lisbon.
- William Melville Codrington, MC. Until recently Acting Assistant Under-secretary of State in the Foreign Office.
- Commander Kenneth Cohen, attached to a Department of the Foreign Office.
- Rodney Alexander Gallop, Head of the General Department of the Foreign Office.
- Archibald McDonald Gordon, Labour Attaché at His Majesty's Embassy in Washington.
- Robert Henry Hadow, MC, Counsellor at His Majesty's Embassy in Washington.
- John Almeric de Courcy Hamilton, MC, Counsellor on the staff of the Resident Minister, Middle East.
- Daniel William Lascelles, Counsellor at His Majesty's Embassy in Athens.
- Engineer Rear-Admiral Charles Joseph Limpenny, DSO, Royal Navy, Retd. Attached to a Department of the Foreign Office.
- John David Mabbott, MA, BLitt. A member of the Foreign Office Research Department.
- Alwyne George Neville Ogden, OBE, His Majesty's Consul-General at Shanghai.
- Oswald Arthur Scott, DSO, Counsellor in His Majesty's Foreign Service seconded to the Ministry of Information.
- Francis Michie Shepherd, OBE, British Political Representative at Helsingfors.
- Lieutenant-Colonel Reginald Sutton-Pratt, OBE, Military Attaché, at His Majesty's Legation in Stockholm.

Honorary Companions

- Alhajji Abdullahi Bayero, CBE (Hon.), Emir of Kano, Nigeria.
- Ibn Mohammed Al Amin Kanemi, CBE (Hon.), Umar, Shehu of Bornu, Nigeria.

=== Order of the Indian Empire ===
==== Knight Grand Commander of the Order of the Indian Empire (GCIE) ====
- Sir Bertrand James Glancy, KCSI, KCIE, Indian Civil Service, Governor of the Punjab.
- Sir George Cunningham, KCSI, KCIE, OBE, Indian Civil Service, Governor of the North-West Frontier Province.
- Lieutenant-Colonel His Highness Farzand-i-Khas-i-Daulat-i-Inglishia Mansur-i-Zaman, Amir-ul-Umra Maharajadhiraja Rajeshwar Sri Maharaja-i-Rajagan Sir Yadavindra Singh Mahindar Bahadur, Maharaja of Patiala, GBE.
- Lieutenant-Colonel His Highness Maharaja-Dhiraja Raj Rajeshwar Shiromani Maha-Raja Sri Sadul Singhji Bahadur, CVO, Maharaja of Bikaner.
- Flight Lieutenant Maharaja Sir Pratap Chandra Bhanja Deo, KCIE, Maharaja of Mayurbhanj.
- Major His Highness Sir Mir Himayat Ali Khan Walashan Nawab Azam Jah Bahadur, GBE, Prince of Berar.
- Sir John Ackroyd Woodhead, KCSI, CIE, Indian Civil Service (Retd.), lately Chairman of the Indian Famine Enquiry Commission.

==== Knight Commander of the Order of the Indian Empire (KCIE) ====
- Sir Ardeshir Rustomji Dalal, Indian Civil Service (Retd.), Member of the Governor-General's Executive Council, and lately Vice-Chairman of the Executive Committee, Bombay Presidency Red Cross Fund.
- Lieutenant-Colonel Cyril Percy Hancock, CIE, OBE, MC, Indian Political Service, Resident at Baroda and for the States of Western India and Gujarat.
- Maharaja Rajendra Narayan Singh Deo, Maharaja of Patna.
- Captain Maharaja Sri Sri Sri Krishna Chanidral Gajapati Inarayan Deo of Parlakimedi, Landholder, Orissa.
- Gerald William Priestley, CIE, Indian Civil Service, Adviser to His Excellency the Governor of Madras.
- Eric Conran-Smith, CSI, CIE, Indian Civil Service, Secretary to the Government of India in the War Transport Department.
- Sir Gurunath Venkatesh Bewoor, CIE, Indian Civil Service, Secretary to the Government of India in the Posts and Air Department.
- Robert Howell Hutchings, CMG, CIE, Indian Civil Service, Secretary to the Government of India in the Department of Food.
- Major-General (local Lieutenant-General) James Bennett Hance, CIE, OBE, MD, Indian Medical Service, Director-General, Indian Medical Service.
- Major-General Heeraji Jehangir Manookji Cursetjee, CSI, DSO, KHS, Indian Medical Service (Indian Army Medical Corps), lately Deputy Director of Medical Services, North-Western Army.
- Major-General Francis Ivan Simms Tuker, CB, DSO, OBE, Indian Army.
- Mir Shuja'at Ali Khan, Walashan Nawab Muazzam Jah Bahadur, Hyderabad (Deccan).
- Lieutenant-Colonel Sardar Sir Muhammad Nawaz Khan, lately Member, Punjab Legislative Assembly, Proprietor of the Kot Estates, Kot Fateh Khan, Attack District, Punjab.

==== Companion of the Order of the Indian Empire (CIE) ====
- Hirendra Chandra Qhakrabatti, lately Member of the Assam Legislative Assembly, Landholder, Hailakandi, Cachar, Assam.
- Theodore Bendysh Watson Bishop, Indian Civil Service, Adviser to His Excellency the Governor of the United Provinces.
- Hiralal Muljibhai Patel, Indian Civil Service, Secretary to the Government of India in the Industries and Civil Supplies Department.
- George Edmond Brackenbury Abell, OBE, Indian Civil Service, Secretary to the Governor-General (Personal) and Private Secretary to His Excellency the Viceroy.
- Colonel (Temporary Major-General) Douglas Beanland, OBE, Indian Army, Major-General i/c Administration, North-Western Army.
- Philip Mason, OBE, Indian Civil Service, Joint Secretary to the Government of India in the War Department.
- Andrew Park Hume, Indian Civil Service, Joint Secretary to the Government of India in the Department of Supply, Munitions Production Secretariat, Calcutta.
- Fergus Munro Innes, Indian Civil Service, Chief Controller of Imports, Government of India.
- Mohammad Ikramullah, Indian Civil Service, Joint Secretary to the Government of India in the Department of Supply.
- Ewart Washington Trotman, Indian Civil Service, Commissioner of Excise, Bombay.
- Walter Henry John Christie, OBE, Indian Civil Service, Joint Secretary to the Government of India in the Department of Food and lately Officiating Director-General, Food.
- The Honourable Khan Khurshid Ali Khan, MBE, Member, Council of State, Lahore, Punjab.
- Major Gerald Charles Lawrence Crichton, Indian Political Service, Counsellor, British Legation, Kabul.
- Cuthbert King, Indian Civil Service, Commissioner, Rawalpindi Division, Punjab.
- Donald MacPherson, Indian Civil Service, Commissioner, Burdwan Division, Bengal.
- Frederic William Wilberforce Baynes, Indian Civil Service, Commissioner, Meerut Division, United Provinces.
- Lieutenant-Colonel Ralf Billing Emerson, OBE, Royal Engineers, General Manager, Great Indian Peninsular Railway, Bombay.
- William Alexander Anderson, General Manager, North-Western Railway, Lahore.
- Edward George Spooner, Iron and Steel Controller, Department of Supply, Government of India, Calcutta.
- Lieutenant-Colonel Kenneth Chalmers Packman, Indian Political Service, Resident in Waziristan, North-West Frontier Province.
- Alan Andrew Phillips, Chief Controller of Railway Priorities, War Transport Department, Government of India.
- Clarence James Creed, OBE, MC, Indian Police, Inspector-General of Police, Bihar.
- W.S. Lieutenant-Colonel (Temporary Brigadier) Robert Leigh Goode, 13th Frontier Force Rifles, Deputy-Director of Staff Duties, General Headquarters, India.
- Lieutenant-Colonel (Temporary Brigadier) (14132) Laurence Douglas Grand, CBE, Royal Engineers, lately Brigadier, Engineer Resources, General Headquarters, India.
- Lieutenant-Colonel (Temporary Brigadier) Charles Cobb, CBE, Royal Indian Army Service Corps, Commander, No. 4, Base Sub-Area.
- Colonel (Temporary Brigadier) Robert Hindmarsh Stubbs, Royal Indian Army Service Corps, Brigadier, RIASC, Central Command.
- Lieutenant-Colonel (Temporary Brigadier) Gilbert Leslie Mold, Indian Army, Director of Personal Services, General Headquarters, India.
- Lieutenant-Colonel (Temporary Brigadier) Cecil Douglas Lovett Turner, OBE, Royal Indian Army Service Corps, Brigadier (Administrative Co-ordination) Quartermaster-General's Branch, General Headquarters, India.
- Colonel (Temporary Brigadier) (965.I.A.) Richard Clarke Lyons, MC, Indian Army Ordnance Corps, lately Chief Inspector of Armaments, General Headquarters, India.
- Colonel (Temporary Brigadier) Brian Pennefather-Evans, OBE, MC, Indian Army Ordnance Corps, Brigadier, IAOC, Southern Army.
- Manilal Jagdishbhai Desai, Indian Civil Service, Revenue Secretary to the Government of Bombay.
- Geoffrey Burgess, OBE, Indian Civil Service, Secretary to His Excellency the Governor of the Central Provinces and Berar.
- David William Dodwell, Indian Civil Service, Secretary to the Government of Madras, Finance Department (on leave).
- Leslie Pascoe Hancox, OBE, Indian Civil Service, Finance Secretary to Government, United Provinces.
- George Maconachie Brander, Indian Civil Service, Secretary to His Excellency the Governor, Punjab.
- Angus Alexander Macdonald, OBE, Indian Civil Service, Elections Commissioner and Home Secretary to Government, Punjab.
- Roy Hesseltine Hammett, Indian Service of Engineers, Chief Engineer and Secretary to Government (Irrigation), Bombay.
- Kizhakkepat Ramunni Menon, Indian Civil Service, Secretary to the Government of Madras, Public Works Department.
- Mian Ghiasuddin, lately Member, Central Legislative Assembly.
- Captain John Cameron, Royal Indian Navy, Principal Officer, Mercantile Marine Department, Calcutta (on leave).
- Abdus Samad Khan, Indian Educational Service, Director of Public Instruction, Bihar.
- Indra Singh Puri, Indian Audit and Accounts Service, Director of Finance, Railway Board, New Delhi.
- Shoilendra Chandra Gupta, Indian Audit and Accounts Service, Director of Audit, War and Supply, Government of India.
- Philip Docton Martyn, OBE, Indian Civil Service, Secretary (Home Department) Government of Bengal.
- Robert Hughes Hill, Indian Agricultural Service, Director of Agriculture, Central Provinces and Berar.
- Alexander Robert Edington, Director of Railway Stores, Railway Board, New Delhi.
- Malcolm Kenneth Johnston, MBE, Indian Police, Deputy Director, Intelligence Bureau, Home Department, Government of India.
- Kuruvila Zachariah, Indian Educational Service, Director of Public Instruction, Bengal.
- Hans Raj Dogra, Indian Service of Engineers (Retd.), Chief Engineer, Public Works Department (Communications), Madras.
- Velagapudi Ramakrishna, Indian Civil Service, Industrial Adviser to the Government of Madras, and lately Chairman, National Service Labour Tribunal, Madras.
- Sardar Gandasing Cheema, DSc, Indian Agricultural Service, Horticulturist to Government and Principal, Agricultural College, Poona, Officiating Director of Agriculture, Bombay.
- Colonel Sohan Lal Bhatia, MC, MD, BCh (Camb.), MRCS (Eng.), FRCP (Lond.), FRS(E), Indian Medical Service, Inspector-General of Civil Hospitals, Assam, and lately Deputy Director-General, Indian Medical Service.
- Acting Captain John Ryland, Royal Indian Navy, HMIS Sutlej.
- Lieutenant-Colonel (Temporary Colonel) Lavinius Brice Marchant, OBE, Royal Indian Army Service Corps, Deputy Director of Recruiting, Eastern Area.
- Lieutenant-Colonel (Temporary Colonel) Alexander Bainbridge Craddock, OBE, Indian Army, Army Equipment Branch, War Staff, India Office.
- W.S. Lieutenant-Colonel (Temporary Colonel) Kumar Shri Himmatsinjhi, Indian Army.
- Jogendra Narayan Majumdar, Barrister-at-Law, Standing Counsel, Government of Bengal.
- Walker Edwin Bushby, Indian Service of Engineers (Retd.), Chairman of the Karachi Port Trust, and lately Superintending Engineer, Public Works Department, Sind.
- Ralph Elizar Shalom, Senior Deputy Director-General, Posts and Telegraphs, New Delhi.
- Terence Bernard Creagh Coen, Indian Civil Service, Political Agent, Gujarat States Agency.
- Ram Chandra Srivastava, OBE, Director, Imperial Institute of Sugar Technology, Cawnpore.
- Edward Hilder Colebrook, MC, Indian Police, Deputy Inspector-General of Police, Northern Range, Waltair, Vizagapatarri District, Madras.
- Khan Bahadur Ghulam Faruque, Deputy Coal Commissioner (Distribution), Calcutta.
- Otto William Patrick Fermie, Postmaster-General, United Provinces Circle, Lucknow.
- Mohamad Yunus, Barrister-at-Law, lately Member of the Bihar Legislative Assembly, Patna, Bihar.
- Rai Bahadur Manmohan Swaroop Mathur, Indian Service of Engineers, Superintending Engineer, Central Public Works Department, Government of India.
- Khan Bahadur Abdul Kadir Mohamed Hussain, Dewan, Junagadh State.
- Harry Percival Smith, Indian Forest Service, Senior Conservator of Forests, Assam.
- Harry Willoughby Oddin-Taylor, CBE, Indian Service of Engineers (Retd.), lately Superintending Engineer, Baluchistan Irrigation Department.
- Captain Godfrey Thomas Benedict Harvey, Director of Publicity, Madras.
- Arthur Coulton Hartley, OBE, Indian Civil Service, Director of Food, Bengal.
- Sir John Nicholson, Bt., Representative of the Ministry of War Transport in Delhi.
- Francis Fearon Turnbull, Private Secretary to the Secretary of State for India, London.
- Frederick James Adams, Secretary, General Department, Office of the High Commissioner for India, London.
- Ebenezer Ahmad Shah, Professor, Lucknow University, and lately Member of the National Defence Council.
- Courtenay Parker Bramble, Partner, Messrs. Drennan and Company, Cotton Brokers, Bombay.
- Percy Henry Carpenter, OBE, Director, Scientific Department, Indian Tea Association, Tocklai, Assam.
- Sardar Bahadur Sardar Indar Singh, Chief Secretary, Faridkot State.
- Captain Rai Bahadur Kashi Nath, MBE, Rural Development Officer, United Provinces.
- Sardar Raghbir Singh, OBE, President, Khalsa Defence of India League.
- Cecil Russell Trevor, Deputy Governor, Reserve Bank of India.

=== Royal Victorian Chain ===
- General His Exalted Highness Asaf Jah Muzaffar-ul-Mulk Wai Mamalik, Nizam-ul-Mulk Nizam-ud-Daula, Nawab Sir Mir Usman Ali Khan, Bahadur Fateh Jang, Faithful Ally of the British Government, GCSI, GBE, Nizam of Hyderabad and Berar.

=== Royal Victorian Order ===
==== Knight Grand Cross of the Royal Victorian Order (GCVO) ====
- The Most Noble Bernard Marmaduke, Duke of Norfolk, KG.
- The Most Noble Douglas, Duke of Hamilton and Brandon, AFC.
- Lieutenant-General His Highness Maharaja Sir Hari Singh Indar Mahindar Bahadur Sipar-i-Saltanat, GCSI, GCIE, KCVO, ADC, Maharaja of Jammu and Kashmir.

==== Dame Commander of the Royal Victorian Order (DCVO) ====
- Edwina Cynthia Annette, Lady Louis Mountbatten.

==== Knight Commander of the Royal Victorian Order (KCVO) ====
- Sir Stewart Duke-Elder, DSc, Ph.D, MD, FRCS.

==== Commander of the Royal Victorian Order (CVO) ====
- Hilda Maud Milsom, CBE
- Captain Richard Oliver-Bellasis, Royal Navy.
- Ivan Whiteside Magill, MB, ChB, DSc.
- Major Arthur Penn, MC
- Major Grismond Picton Philipps, Grenadier Guards (dated 19 August 1945).

==== Member of the Royal Victorian Order (MVO) ====
At this time the two lowest classes of the Royal Victorian Order were "Member (fourth class)" and "Member (fifth class)", both with post-nominal letters MVO. "Member (fourth class)" was renamed "Lieutenant" (LVO) from the 1985 New Year Honours onwards.

Fourth Class

- Frederick William Barry, MVO.
- Edward John Gilling.
- Jocelyn Godefroi, MVO.
- Colonel William Francis Henn.
- Lieutenant-Colonel Ririd Myddelton (dated 22 November 1945).
- Aubrey John Toppin, FSA.
- Herbert Edward Ogle Wheeler.

Fifth Class

- Rosina Mary McLennan.
- Dorothy Joan Wilson.
- Thomas Edward Ridout (dated 19 October 1945).
- James Gordon Singer, MBE
- Albert Skipworth (dated 30 October 1945).
- Superintendent David Storrier, MBE, Metropolitan Police.
- Frank Wakeham.
- Robert Henry Wood.

=== Order of the British Empire ===
==== Knight Grand Cross of the Order of the British Empire (GBE) ====
Military Division

Royal Navy

- Admiral of the Fleet Sir James Fownes Somerville, GCB, KBE, DSO.
- Admiral Sir Charles Edward Kennedy-Purvis, KCB.
- Vice-Admiral Sir Arthur John Power, KCB, CVO.

Army

- Lieutenant-General Sir Alexander Hood, KCB, CBE, MD, FRCP, KHP, (18164), late Royal Army Medical Corps.
- Lieutenant-General Sir Wilfrid Gordon Lindsell, KCB, KBE, DSO, MC, (6156), late Royal Regiment of Artillery, Colonel Commandant, Royal Artillery.
- General Sir William Joseph Slim, KCB, CBE, DSO, MC, (8709), Indian Army, Colonel Commandant, 7th Gurkha Rifles.

Royal Air Force

- Air Marshal Sir Douglas Claude Strathern Evill, KCB, DSC, AFC.

Civil Division

- Sir Edward Victor Appleton, KCB, DSc, LLD, FRS, Secretary, Department of Scientific and Industrial Research.
- Sir Thomas Dalmahoy Barlow, KBE, Director-General of Civilian Clothing, Board of Trade.
- Sir Henry Leon French, KCB, KBE, lately Secretary, Ministry of Food.
- Sir Maurice Gerald Holmes, KCB, OBE, lately Permanent Secretary, Ministry of Education.
- Sir Harold Gibson Howitt, DSO, MC, FCA, JP, DL, Member of the Air Council since 1939.
- Major-General Sir John Kennedy, KBE, CB, CMG, DSO, Vice-Chairman, Executive Committee of the Joint War Organisation of the British Red Cross Society and Order of St. John
- Sir (Francis) Vernon Thomson, Bt, KBE, Principal Shipping Adviser, Ministry of War Transport.
- Lieutenant-Colonel His Highness Maharaja Manikya Sir Bir Bikram Shore Deb Barman Bahadur, KCSI, Maharaja of Tripura.

==== Dame Commander of the Order of the British Empire (DBE) ====
Military Division

- Chief Controller (temporary) Leslie Violet Lucy Evelyn Whateley, CBE, (192035), Auxiliary Territorial Service.

Civil Division

- Edith Mary Evans (Mrs. George Booth), Actress.
- Angela Olivia, Countess of Limerick, CBE, Deputy Chairman, Joint War Organisation of the British Red Cross Society and Order of St. John.
- Hilda Madeleine, Duchess of Richmond and Gordon, CBE, JP, Vice-President, Soldiers', Sailors', and Airmen's Families Association.

==== Knight Commander of the Order of the British Empire (KBE) ====
Military Division

Royal Navy

- Admiral Marshal Llewellyn Clarke, CB, DSC, (Retd).
- Vice-Admiral Arthur Francis Pridham, CB, (Retd).
- Vice-Admiral Douglas Blake Fisher, CB, CBE.
- Rear-Admiral Richard Hugh Loraine Bevan, CB, DSO, MVO, (Retd).
- Engineer Rear-Admiral Henry William Wildish, CB, CBE, (Retd).
- Acting Major-General Leslie Chasemore Hollis, CB, CBE, Royal Marines.
- Temporary Surgeon Rear-Admiral Gordon Gordon-Taylor, CB, OBE, MS, MB, FRCS.
- Temporary Surgeon Rear-Admiral Richard Alun Rowlands, OBE, MD.

Army

- Lieutenant-General (temporary) Frederick Arthur Montague Browning, CB, DSO, (22588), late Grenadier Guards.
- Major-General Ernest Cyril Gepp, CB, DSO, (6870), late The Duke of Cornwall's Light Infantry.
- Major-General Noel Galway Holmes, CB, CBE, MC, (4842), late The East Yorkshire Regiment (The Duke of York's Own).
- Lieutenant-General (honorary) Balfour Oliphant Hutchison (4670), late 10th Royal Hussars (Prince of Wales's Own), Royal Armoured Corps.
- Maior-General Donald Jay McMullen, CB, CBE, DSO, MIMechE, (22933), late Corps of Royal Engineers.
- Major-General (temporary) William Heanage Ogilvie, MD, FRCS, (131569), late Royal Army Medical Corps.
- Major-General Charles Max Page, CB, DSO, MS, FRCS, (51065), late Royal Army Medical Corps.
- Major-General (temporary) Arnold Walmsley Stott, FRCP, (106008), late Royal Army Medical Corps.
- Major-General Leslie Hamlyn Williams, CB, MC, (1230), Royal Army Ordnance Corps.

Royal Air Force

- Air Marshal Sir Arthur Coningham, KCB, DSO, MC, DFC, AFC.
- Acting Air Marshal George Clark Pirie, CB, CBE, MC, DFC.
- Acting Air Marshal Horace Ernest Philip Wigglesworth, CB, CBE, DSC.
- Air Vice-Marshal John Henry D'Albiac, CB, DSO.
- Air Vice-Marshal William Forster Dickson, CB, CBE, DSO, AFC.
- Air Vice-Marshal William Elliot, CB, CBE, DFC.
- Air Vice-Marshal Thomas Walker Elmhirst, CB, CBE, AFC.
- Air Vice-Marshal Ephraim William Havers, CB, CBE.
- Air Vice-Marshal Alfred Samuel Morris, CBE.
- Air Vice-Marshal Edward Arthur Beckton Rice, CB, CBE, MC.
- Air Vice-Marshal Arthur Penrose Martyn Sanders, CB, CBE.
- Acting Air Vice-Marshal Stanford Cade, CB, FRCS, MRCP, RAFVR.
- Acting Air Vice-Marshal Charles Putnam Symonds, CB, MD, FRCP, RAFVR.

Civil Division

- Eric St. John Bamford, CB, CMG, Director-General, Ministry of Information.
- James Horace Barnes, Deputy Under-secretary of State, Air Ministry.
- William Guy Norr-Bower, CB, CBE, Joint Deputy Secretary, Ministry of Fuel and Power.
- Sir (Joseph) Herbert Cunliffe, KC, Chairman of the General Council of the Bar, Attorney-General of the Duchy of Lancaster.
- Sir Graham Cunningham, Controller-General of Munitions Production, Ministry of Supply.
- Sir Walter Ernest Hargreaves, Head of the War Risks Insurance Office, Ministry of War Transport.
- Sir John Robert Renwick, Bt., lately Controller of Communications, Air Ministry and of Communications Equipment, Ministry of Aircraft Production.
- Richmond Walton, CB, Deputy Secretary, Admiralty.
- Thomas Percival Creed, CBE, MC, Legal Secretary, Sudan Government.
- Charles James Henderson, British subject resident in France.
- Judge Hugh Oliver Holmes, CMG, MC, KC, Procurator-General of the Mixed Court of Appeal, Alexandria.
- John Hall Magowan, CMG, OBE, Minister (Commercial) in His Majesty's Embassy at Washington.
- The Honourable George Frederick Jenkins, Minister of Agriculture and Minister of Forests, State of South Australia.
- Nawab Muhammad Farid Khan, CBE, Nawab of Amb, North-West Frontier Province.
- His Grace Monsignor Michael Gonzi, DD, Metropolitan Archbishop of Malta.
- Joseva Lalabalaru Vanaaliali Sukuna, CBE, MM, Colonial Administrative Service, Secretary, Fijian Affairs, Fiji.

==== Commander of the Order of the British Empire (CBE) ====
Military Division

Royal Navy

- Captain Edward Murray Conrad Barraclough.
- Captain (S) Alan George Bath, OBE, ADC.
- Acting Captain Francis Riou Baxter, (Retd).
- Captain Willoughby Greaves Beauchamp, VD, RNVR.
- Grace Laughton Bell, Superintendent, WRNS.
- Violet Constance Sophie Boyd, Superintendent, WRNS.
- Engineer Rear-Admiral Frederick Henry Buckmaster (Retd).
- Acting Temporary Captain Edward Foyle Collingwood, RNVR.
- Engineer Captain George Fitzgerald Croker, (Retd).
- Amy Curtis, MBE, Superintendent, WRNS.
- Acting Captain Gordon Albert Sindon Montefiore de Wilton, (Retd).
- Captain Harold Drew, DSC.
- Acting Captain Ralph Campbell Musbury Duckworth, OBE.
- Captain Reginald Stannus Goff, DSO, (Retd).
- Acting Captain Michael Grant Goodenough, DSO.
- Captain Guy Grantham, CB, DSO.
- Acting Captain (S) Kenneth Beatson Septimus Greig, (Retd).
- Captain (S) Edward Douglas Guinness, RD, RNR.
- Acting Captain (S) Edgar Haslehurst.
- Colonel Commandant (Temporary Brigadier) Thomas Henry Jameson, DSO, OBE, Royal Marines.
- Captain Alexander Cumming Gordon Madden.
- Acting Constructor Captain Albert John Merrington, OBE, RCNC.
- Engineer Captain Herbert Moy, OBE.
- Captain (E) Ronald Gordon Murray.
- Captain Hugh St. Lawrence Nicolson, DSO.
- Engineer Captain Alexander Hart Parry, (Retd).
- Acting Captain Neville Arthur Prichard.
- Acting Captain (S) Sydney James Read, RD, RNR (Retd).
- Surgeon Rear-Admiral Charles Fox Octavius Sankey, OBE, MB, BS, MRCS, LRCP.
- Lieutenant-Colonel (Acting Colonel Commandant) (Temporary Brigadier) Philip Royal Smith-Hill, Royal Marines.
- Captain Walter Cecil Tancred, (Retd).
- Captain Hugh Aldersley Taylor, (Retd).
- Lieutenant-Colonel (Acting Colonel Commandant) (Temporary Brigadier) Vivian Davenport Thomas, OBE, Royal Marines.
- Surgeon Rear-Admiral Francis John Despard Twigg, MB, BCh, DOMS.
- Inspector Captain William George West, OBE, MA.
- Temporary Surgeon Rear-Admiral Robert Joseph Willan, MVO, OBE, MS, FRCS.

Army

- Colonel (temporary) John Hunter Adam, CIE, OBE, (98041), Special List (TARO).
- Major-General (temporary) St. John Desmond Arcedeckne-Butler (10309), late Royal Corps of Signals.
- Brigadier (temporary) Ralph Frederick Richard Becker (10739), The Cameronians (Scottish Rifles).
- Colonel (temporary) Walter Herbert Blagden (15415), Corps of Royal Engineers.
- Lieutenant-Colonel (Brevet Colonel) Claude Herbert Dick Bonnett, OBE, TD, (7610), The Royal Fusiliers (City of London Regiment).
- Brigadier (temporary) Valentine Boucher, OBE, (30664), The Buffs (Royal East Kent Regiment).
- Colonel Clare Brayton Bouchier, MC, (22548), late Royal Tank Regiment, Royal Armoured Corps.
- Brigadier (temporary) Leslie Ernest Bourke, OBE, (27894), Royal Regiment of Artillery.
- Brigadier (local) James Davidson Stuart Cameron, MD, FRCP, (95884), Royal Army Medical Corps.
- Brigadier (temporary) Donald Campion, OBE, (15593), late Corps of Royal Engineers.
- Colonel (temporary) Cyril Roy Chambers, MC, (8977), The South Lancashire Regiment (The Prince of Wales's Volunteers).
- Brigadier (temporary) William Scott Cole (18910), late Corps of Royal Engineers.
- Colonel (temporary) Frederick Noel Charlton (111600), General List.
- Colonel (temporary) Archibald Hugh Tennent Chisholm (146544), Intelligence Corps.
- Brigadier (temporary) John Atherton Churchill, DSO, MC, ADC, (3473), late The Durham Light Infantry.
- Brigadier (temporary) John Guise Cowley, OBE, AM, (33330), Corps of Royal Engineers.
- Brigadier (temporary) Norman Vincent Craig (102439), The Bedfordshire and Hertfordshire Regiment.
- Colonel Wilson Theodore Oliver Crewdson (4256), late Royal Regiment of Artillery.
- Colonel (temporary) Humphrey John Denham (122918), Royal Army Ordnance Corps.
- Brigadier (temporary) Arthur Julian Hadfield Dove, MBE, (14522), Corps of Royal Engineers.
- Brigadier (temporary) Richard John Octavius Dowse, AMIMechE, (8138), late Royal Army Service Corps.
- Brigadier George Dittmer, DSO, MBE, MC, Commanding Officer of Fiji Military Forces.
- Brigadier (temporary) William Donald Edward, DSO, 12th Frontier Force Regiment, Indian Army.
- Major-General (acting) Augustus Klingner Ferguson (13080), The Leicestershire Regiment.
- Brigadier (temporary) Colquhoun Lloyd Fox (15609), Corps of Royal Engineers.
- Colonel (acting) Ernest Edward Gee, DSO, MC, (73), Royal Regiment of Artillery.
- Brigadier (temporary) James Hamilton Graham, AMIMechE, (6875), late Royal Electrical and Mechanical Engineers.
- Brigadier (temporary) Walter Charles Alfred Hanney (22374), The Royal Berkshire Regiment (Princess Charlotte of Wales's).
- Brigadier (temporary) John Herbert Hardy, MC, (5035), The King's Own Royal Regiment (Lancaster).
- Controller (temporary) Gwenllian Margaret Heaton (192039), Auxiliary Territorial Service.
- Brigadier (temporary) Frank Allison Hibberd (96253), Royal Electrical and Mechanical Engineers.
- Brigadier (temporary) Harry Ewart Hopthrow, OBE, MIMechE, (32797), Corps of Royal Engineers.
- Brigadier (temporary) Hugh Roberts Howard, OBE, AMIMechE, (8942), late Royal Army Service Corps.
- Brigadier (temporary) Cecil Edward Ronald Ince, OBE, (35158), Royal Army Service Corps.
- Brigadier (temporary) John Innes, BA, (38395), Corps of Royal Engineers.
- Brigadier (temporary) Guy Oscar Mayston Jameson, BA, (33350), Corps of Royal Engineers.
- Brigadier (temporary) William Gwyn Dansey Knapton (27933), late Corps of Royal Engineers.
- Brigadier (temporary) Maurice Leacox, OBE, (13902), Royal Army Ordnance Corps.
- Brigadier (temporary) John Alexander Longmore, MBE, TD, (7569), The Hertfordshire Regiment.
- Brigadier (temporary) Victor Oswald Lonsdale, OBE, (15236), Royal Army Ordnance Corps.
- Brigadier (temporary) Edward FitzHenry Lynch (1958), The Loyal Regiment (North Lancashire).
- Brigadier (acting) John Mandeville Macfie, OBE, MC, MB, (14140), Royal Army Medical Corps.
- Brigadier (temporary) Kenneth Stirling Mackenzie, MC, (21179), late Royal Regiment of Artillery.
- Colonel (temporary) Jack Swaine Marsh, MC, (5901), Royal Regiment of Artillery.
- Major-General (acting) Neil McMicking, DSO, OBE, MC, (82604), late The Black Watch (Royal Highland Regiment).
- Colonel Valentine Elkin Mocatta, OBE, (1816), late Cavalry, Royal Armoured Corps.
- Colonel (acting) Cedric Gell Moore, MC, TD, (7825), Army Cadet Force.
- Brigadier (temporary) John Field Fraser Oakeshott, OBE, (298), Royal Army Ordnance Corps.
- Brigadier (temporary) Cecil Orme Olliver (18214), late Royal Regiment of Artillery.
- Colonel (temporary) Rowan Scrope Rait-Kerr, DSO, MC, (25415), Corps of Royal Engineers.
- Brigadier (temporary) Charles Douglas Roberts, OBE, (106176), Royal Regiment of Artillery.
- Brigadier (temporary) Cecil Bruce Robertson, OBE, MC, (8964), late Argyll and Sutherland Highlanders (Princess Louise's).
- Colonel (temporary) William Henry Rowe, DSO, (11942), The Buffs (Royal East Kent Regiment).
- Brigadier (acting) Edwin Seymour-Bell, TD, (25293), Corps of Royal Engineers.
- Brigadier (temporary) Desmond Henry Sykes Somerville, MC, (6681), late The South Wales Borderers.
- Colonel (temporary) Eustace Dupuis Henchman Stocker, OBE, MC, (28539), Extra Regimentally Employed List.
- Brigadier (acting) Hurford Tatlow, OBE, MC, (216461), Royal Army Service Corps (E.F.I.).
- Colonel (temporary) Claude Cecil Latham Tofield (128888), Royal Electrical and Mechanical Engineers.
- Lieutenant-Colonel Julian Watson, OBE, MC, (46552), Royal Corps of Signals.
- Brigadier (temporary) Sidney Albert Westrop, DSO, MC, (48802), Corps of Royal Engineers.
- Brigadier (temporary) Percival Napier White (619), The Sherwood Foresters (Nottinghamshire and Derbyshire Regiment).
- Colonel (temporary) Thomas Urie Wilson, MBE, TD, (28224), Royal Regiment of Artillery.
- Brigadier (temporary) Henry Ayerst Young, DSO, (27075), Royal Regiment of Artillery.

Royal Air Force

- Air Vice-Marshal Frank Cuninghame Cowtan, CB, MRCS, LRCP, KHS.
- Acting Air Vice-Marshal Geoffrey Arthur Henzell Pidcock.
- Air Commodore Kenneth Biggs, MC.
- Air Commodore Christopher Neil Hope Bilney, OBE.
- Air Commodore Edward Irvine Bussell.
- Air Commodore Gerald Paul Halliley Carter.
- Air Commodore Edward Dayrell Handley Davies.
- Air Commodore George William Patrick Grant.
- Air Commodore John Melbourne Mason, DSC, DFC.
- Air Commodore Duncan McLaren.
- Air Commodore Harold John Granville Ellis Proud.
- Air Commodore Eric Heady Richardson.
- Air Commodore Henry Norman Thornton, MBE.
- Air Commodore Sidney Norman Webster, AFC.
- Air Commodore James John Williamson, AFC.
- Acting Air Commodore David Francis William Atcherley, DSO, DFC, ADC.
- Acting Air Commodore Constantine Evelyn Benson, DSO, AAF.
- Acting Air Commodore Francis Joseph St. George Braithwaite, OBE.
- Acting Air Commodore Roderick Aeneas Chisholm, DSO, DFC, AAF Reserve of Officers.
- Acting Air Commodore Charles Worwood Dicken.
- Acting Air Commodore Alfred Earle.
- Acting Air Commodore Samuel Charles Elworthy, DSO, DFC, AFC.
- Acting Air Commodore Harold Arthur Fenton, DSO, DFC.
- Acting Air Commodore Andrew James Wray Geddes, DSO, OBE.
- Acting Air Commodore Colin McKay Grierson.
- Acting Air Commodore John Robert Hallings-Pott, DSO, AFC.
- Acting Air Commodore John Gossett Hawtrey.
- Acting Air Commodore Cyril Montague Heard.
- Acting Air Commodore Joseph Louis Hurley, RCAF.
- Acting Air Commodore David William Lane.
- Acting Air Commodore William Mary Lawrence Macdonald, DFC.
- Acting Air Commodore Frank Robert Miller, RCAF.
- Acting Air Commodore Reginald Leslie Mills, OBE.
- Acting Air Commodore Frederick John Murphy.
- Acting Air Commodore Ronald Lancelot Phillips.
- Acting Air Commodore Sydney Leo Gregory Pope, DFC, AFC.
- Acting Air Commodore Noel Christie Singer, DSO, DFC.
- Acting Air Commodore Geoffrey Roger Cole Spencer, OBE.
- Acting Air Commodore Francis Ronald Downs Swain, OBE, AFC.
- Acting Air Commodore John Francis Titmas.
- Acting Air Commodore Reginald Newnham Waite.
- Acting Air Commodore John Bankes Walmsley, DFC.
- Acting Air Commodore Ivor Letts Winger.
- Group Captain Thomas Maxfield Abraham, DFC.
- Group Captain Benjamin Ball, OBE.
- Group Captain Eric Cecil Bates, AFC.
- Group Captain Ernest Trevor Beer, OBE.
- Group Captain Gordon Richard Brice.
- Group Captain Bertram Arnold James Crummy.
- Group Captain Frederick Claude Daubney.
- Group Captain Sidney Albert Dismore.
- Group Captain Frederick Robert Drew.
- Group Captain William Frederick Dry.
- Group Captain Douglas Joyce Eayrs, DFC.
- Group Captain Kenneth Harries Riversdale Elliot, DSO.
- Group Captain John Augustine Elliott.
- Group Captain Reginald Herbert Embleton Emson, AFC.
- Group Captain Frank Westerman Felgate.
- Group Captain Charles Henry Flinn.
- Group Captain Oswald Kynaston Griffin.
- Group Captain Richard Kaye Hamblin.
- Group Captain George Norman Hancock.
- Group Captain John Alfred Hawkins.
- Group Captain John Hamer Hill.
- Group Captain Edgar Arnott Hodgson.
- Group Captain Robert Henry Horniman.
- Group Captain Leonard Horwood, MC.
- Group Captain Humphrey Dight Humphreys, LDS.
- Group Captain John Wilfred Hunt.
- Group Captain Wallace Hart Kyle, DSO, DFC.
- Group Captain Harold Guy Leonard-Williams.
- Group Captain Malcolm Lowe.
- Group Captain John Alexander McDonald.
- Group Captain Colin Campbell McMullen, AFC.
- Group Captain George Rogers Montgomery.
- Group Captain Frank Edward Nuttall, OBE.
- Group Captain Henry Dunboyne O'Neill.
- Group Captain John Constable-Roberts.
- Group Captain Thomas Ulric Curzon Shirley.
- Group Captain Vincent Russell Smith.
- Group Captain William John Greaves Walker.
- Group Captain Richard Lindsay Wallace, AFC.
- Group Captain Thomas Gordon Waterlow.
- Group Captain Michael Watson, OBE.
- Group Captain Hamish McCullock White, RAFO.
- Group Captain Cyril Beresford Wincott.
- Group Captain Ernest Richard Wood.
- Group Captain John Frederick Young, MBE, MM.
- Group Captain Ronald Hildyard Young, DSO, AFC.
- Colonel Stephanus Francois Du Toit, DFC, SAAF.
- Acting Group Captain Sidney James Bailey, OBE.
- Acting Group Captain Harold Peter Broad, DFC.
- Acting Group Captain Graham Nelson Coward.
- Acting Group Captain Thomas Charles Dickens.
- Acting Group Captain Joscelyne Forgan Houssemayne Du Boulay, DFC.
- Acting Group Captain John Cherry, OBE, AAF Reserve of Officers.
- Acting Group Captain Clarence Edwin Foster, RAFVR.
- Acting Group Captain Paul Slocombe Gomez.
- Acting Group Captain George Edward Gordon-Duff, RAFVR.
- Acting Group Captain Harold Edmund Hills, OBE, AAF.
- Acting Group Captain Lionel Arthur Jackson, OBE.
- Acting Group Captain Edward Geoffrey Lyall Millington, DFC.
- Acting Group Captain Crichton Charles Morton.
- Acting Group Captain Percy John Mote.
- Acting Group Captain William Victor Nicholas.
- Acting Group Captain Arthur Henry Pearce, DFC.
- Acting Group Captain Peter John Archibald Riddell.
- Acting Group Captain Frederick John Sherman, RAFVR.
- Acting Group Captain George Albert Simons, AFC.
- Acting Group Captain Reginald William Stewart, AFC.
- Acting Group Captain Thomas James Edward Thornton.
- Acting Group Captain Brian Thynne, AFC.
- Acting Group Captain Richard Henry Waterhouse, DFC, AFC, RAFO.
- Acting Group Captain Steward Gordon Wise, DFC.
- The Rev. Reginald Fraser Diggle, MC.
- Wing Commander Jack Harris Harris, RAFO.
- Wing Commander Alfred William Hunt.
- Wing Commander Denis Frank Spotswood, DSO, DFC, RAFO.

Civil Division

- George Henry Garstin Anderson, DSO, MC, lately Principal Officer, Eastern Civil Defence Region.
- Professor Arthur Wilfred Ashby, JP, lately Professor of Agricultural Economics, University College, Aberystwyth.
- Colonel Robert William Awdry, JP, Chairman, Wiltshire County Council Emergency Committee.
- Lieutenant-Colonel Edward Duncan Basden, MC, Director of Voluntary Organisations, War Office.
- Beatrix Marguerite Fox Batten, OBE, County Director, Kent Branch, British Red Cross Society.
- John Wyrill Bayley, Managing Director, Ellerman's Wilson Line.
- Major Hewitt Pearson Montague Beames, MInstCE, MIMechE, Chairman of the Emergency Committee, County of Cheshire.
- Robert John Beattie, Assistant Solicitor, Ministry of Agriculture and Fisheries.
- Lieutenant-Colonel Basil John Montfort Bebb, lately Principal Assistant Secretary, Ministry of Economic Warfare.
- Frank Heywood Bedford, Principal Director of Contracts and Chairman of the Contracts Board, Ministry of Supply.
- Lieutenant-Colonel Stanley Bell, AFC, in charge of Equipment Divisions and R.A.F. Liaison Officer, Department of National Service Entertainment.
- Henry Wilfred Botting, Chief Engineer Officer, SS Queen Mary, Cunard White Star Ltd.
- The Honourable Maurice Richard Bridgeman, Principal Assistant Secretary, Ministry of Fuel and Power.
- Professor James Leslie Brierly, OBE, DCL, JP, Chairman of Wages Councils, Ministry of Labour and National Service.
- John Brown, General Secretary, Iron and Steel Trades Confederation.
- Eugene Brunning, Regional Controller for Wales Board of Trade.
- George William Carter Buchanan, President, National Federation of Building Trades Employers.
- Joseph Budge, MC, WS, JP, Chairman, Agricultural Executive Committee for Ross and Cromarty (Mainland).
- William Wood Burkett, OBE, MC, Assistant Secretary, Ministry of Civil Aviation.
- Herbert Southernden Burn, AMInstCE, lately head of the Production Division, Ministry of Production.
- Lieutenant-Colonel Richard Frank Burnand, OBE, Honorary Adviser, Legal Aid Scheme, Army Welfare Service Directorate.
- Lieutenant-Colonel Hugh Campbell, MC, Chairman, Port Welfare Committee, Glasgow and West of Scotland.
- William Adam Chapman, DSO, JP, lately County Surveyor, Lanarkshire.
- Frederick Wadden Charles, Accountant, London and Eastern Districts, Ministry of Food.
- Philip Cohen, MBE, Deputy Director of Accounts, Air Ministry.
- John Marr Collie, City Engineer, and formerly Officer-in-Charge, Civil Defence Rescue Service, Sheffield.
- Charles Blampied Colston, MC, DCM, lately Regional Controller, Ministry of Production.
- Temporary Colonel John Kyme Cordeaux, Royal Marines, employed in a department of the Foreign Office.
- Richard Corless, OBE, Assistant Director of the Meteorological Office, Air Ministry.
- William Charles Milford Couch, MIEE, Deputy Director of Electrical Engineering, Admiralty.
- George Richard Critchley, General Manager, Liverpool and Glasgow Salvage Association.
- George Scott Cromar, OBE, Regional Director, Merchant Shipbuilding and Repairs, Admiralty, for West of Scotland and Northern Ireland.
- George Cruickshank, JP, lately Air Raid Precautions Controller, East Lothian.
- Professor John Cruickshank, MD, Professor of Bacteriology, Aberdeen University. For services to Civil Defence.
- Betty Wake Cuthbert, OBE, Chief Woman Fire Officer, National Fire Service Headquarters.
- George Dallas, JP, Chairman of the River Nene Catchment Board.
- Stanley Raymond Dennison, Chief Economic Assistant, Offices of the Cabinet and Minister of Defence.
- Robert George de Wardt, Deputy Regional Director, London Telecommunications Region, General Post Office.
- John Edward de Watteville, Assistant Secretary, Scottish Home Department.
- Helen Dey, OBE, RRC, Matron, St. Bartholomew's Hospital, Sector Matron, Emergency Hospital Service.
- John Charles Alexander Doherty, Director of Works II, Air Ministry.
- Stanley Fabes Dorey, DSc, MInstCE, MIMechE, Chief Engineer Surveyor, Lloyd's Registe of Shipping.
- Percy Dunsheath, OBE, DSc, MIEE, Chief Engineer and Director, W. T. Henley's Telegraph Works Company Ltd.
- William Edwards, President, National Road Transport Employers' Federation.
- William Elliott, lately Chief Inspector of Technical and Continuation Schools, Ministry of Education.
- Cecil Tom Every, lately Director of Post-War Building Programmes, Ministry of Works.
- Mary Margaret Desiree, Viscountess Falmouth, Vice-President, Cornwall Branch, British Red Cross Society.
- Robert Edwin Field, OBE, Assistant Secretary, India Office.
- Alderman Frank Savin Foster, JP, Group Co-ordinating Officer and Civil Defence Controller, Group 7, London Region.
- Alexander Stewart Frere, lately Assistant Secretary, Ministry of Labour and National Service.
- Thomas Burkett Gibson, Higher Collector, Board of Customs and Excise.
- John Graham Gird Wood, Controller of Canteens, Ministry of Supply.
- James William Golsby, MBE, Assistant Secretary, Department of Overseas Trade.
- Ernest William Goodale, MC, Chairman of the Silk and Rayon Users Association, for services to the Board of Trade.
- Professor James Gray, MC, ScD, LLD, FRS, Professor of Zoology, University of Cambridge.
- Councillor Alfred Robert Grindlay, OBE, JP, Chairman, Coventry Savings Committee.
- Herbert Noah Grundy, OBE, lately Regional Controller, North Western Region, Ministry of Labour and National Service; now Regional Controller, North Western Region, Board of Trade.
- Rupert William Hammond, Resident Director, Airframe Factories, Rootes Securities Ltd.
- Frank Neville Harby, Secretary, Exchequer and Audit Department.
- Kenneth Farr Harker, Senior Shipping and Transport Executive, United Kingdom Commercial Corporation.
- Douglas Alexander Earsman Harkness, Senior Assistant Secretary, Ministry of Agriculture, Northern Ireland.
- Thomas Emlyn Harris, Deputy Director-General of Ordnance Factories, Ministry of Supply.
- Captain Edward George Godolphin Hastings, OBE, Royal Navy, Employed in a department of the Foreign Office.
- Tom Christopher Hayward, Clerk of the West Sussex County Council, and formerly Air Raid Precautions Controller.
- Frank Nutter Hepworth, JP, a Member of Courts of Inquiry and Boards of Investigation, Ministry of Labour and National Service.
- Herbert Raikes Hepworth, MInstCE, lately Surveyor and Engineer to the West Riding County Council. For services to Civil Defence.
- John Heys, Town Clerk and formerly Air Raid Precautions Controller, Sheffield.
- George Robert Disraeli Hogg, Assistant Secretary, Department of Scientific and Industrial Research.
- James Kenneth Hope, DL, Clerk of the County Council and formerly Air Raid Precautions Controller, Durham County.
- Reginald Horrocks, Civil Assistant, War Office.
- Colonel William Thomas Reginald Houldsworth, TD, JP, DL, For services to Agriculture in the West of Scotland.
- Hubert Nutcombe Hume, MC, lately Director of Finance (Commercial), Ministry of Supply.
- John Bowman Hunter, MC, MCh, FRCS, Sector Hospital Officer, London Emergency Medical Service.
- Professor Charles Frederick William Illingworth, MD, ChM, FRCS(Ed.), FRFPS, Honorary Director of Surgical Services for the Emergency Medical Service in the Western area of Scotland.
- Arthur Hedley Johnstone, OBE, Chief Regional Fire Officer, No. 7 (South-Western) Fire Region, National Fire Service.
- Group Captain Eric Malcolm Jones, employed in a department of the Foreign Office.
- Professor Herbert Davenport Kay, OBE, DSc, PhD, FRS, Director, National Institute for Research in Dairying, University of Reading.
- Arthur William Kenyon, FRIBA, Consultant to the Minister of Works.
- Charles Edward Key, Assistant Secretary, War Office.
- Thomas Pomfret Kilner, MB, BS, FRCS, Nuffield Professor of Plastic Surgery, University of Oxford. For services to the Ministry of Pensions.
- Herbert Ryder King, Chairman of West Suffolk County Council and formerly Chairman of County Emergency Committee.
- Captain William Henry Knight, Master, SS Alcantara, Royal Mail Lines, Ltd.
- Major Thomas Knowles, Coal Tar Controller, Ministry of Fuel and Power.
- Gerald William Lacey, ARIC, lately Controller of Light Metals, Ministry of Aircraft Production.
- Captain John Vivian Langford, Master, MV Reina Del Paeinco, Pacific Steam Navigation Company Ltd.
- Oliver Lyndon Lawrence, Principal Assistant Secretary, serving in a Department of the Foreign Office; recently employed in the Ministry of Economic Warfare.
- Major-General Robert Walter Dickson Leslie, CB, OBE, LRCPI&LM, LRCSI&LM, Regional Hospital Officer, Region 3, Emergency Medical Service.
- Arthur William Loach, Deputy Chief Inspector of Taxes, Board of Inland Revenue.
- Cecil Arthur Loombe, MC, Director of Cereal Products, Ministry of Food.
- Alexander Collie Low, Secretary, Engineering and Allied Employers' National Federation.
- Brigadier-General Robert McCalmont, CVO, DSO, Command Welfare Officer, Northern Ireland.
- George Dodds McLaren, JP, Convener, Stirling County Council.
- Professor Thomas Porter McMurray, MB, MCh, FRCS(Ed.), Regional Consultant in Orthopedic Surgery, Emergency Medical Service.
- Reginald Stewart MacTier, Director of Port and Transit Control, Ministry of War Transport.
- James Alexander Mair, Director of Education, Rotherham.
- Wilfrid Stephen Mansfield, Liaison Officer, Ministry of Agriculture and Fisheries.
- Alfred Vigor Marten, MVO, Clerk to the Keeper of His Majesty's Privy Purse.
- Joseph Louis Mather, OBE, Assistant Secretary and Chief Regional Officer, Assistance Board.
- Thomas William Midmer, OBE, Principal Deputy Director of Armament Supply, Admiralty.
- Alderman William Miles, OBE, JP, Lately Mayor of Southend-on-Sea and Chairman of the Emergency Committee.
- Benno Moiseiwitsch, Pianist. For Services to Mrs. Churchill's Red Cross Aid to Russia Fund.
- Thomas Moran, DSc, PhD, Director of Research and Deputy Scientific Adviser, Ministry of Food.
- John Moss, Public Assistance Officer for Kent. For services to Civil Defence.
- Brigadier Fredrick William Nicholls, OBE, attached General Staff, War Office.
- Laurence Herbert Oliver, JP, Deputy-Clerk, London County Council. For services to Civil Defence.
- Walter Edmund Parker, Assistant Secretary, Board of Trade.
- Nancy Broadfield Parkinson, OBE, Director, Home Division, British Council.
- Colin Hargreaves Pearson, Assistant Solicitor, Office of HM Procurator-General and Treasury Solicitor.
- Rudolf Ernst Peierls, DSc, DPhil, Scientific Consultant on Atomic Bomb Research, Department of Scientific and Industrial Research.
- The Honourable John Jocelyn Denison-Pender, Joint Managing Director, Cable & Wireless, Ltd.
- Albert John Philpot, OBE, Director of Research and Secretary, British Scientific Instrument Research Association.
- James Davidson Pratt, OBE, MIChemE, FRIC, Director and Secretary, Association of British Chemical Manufacturers.
- Joseph Francis Engledue Prideaux, OBE, MRCS, Deputy Director-General of Medical Services, Ministry of Pensions.
- Captain Robert Oldreive Putt, Commodore-Master, British Tanker Company Ltd.
- William St. John Pym, Head of Staff Administration, British Broadcasting Corporation.
- William Gordon Radley, PhD, MIEE, Controller of Research, Engineer-in-Chief's Office, General Post Office.
- Cecil George Herbert Richardson, Joint-Managing Director, Ransome & Marles Bearing Company Ltd.
- Arthur Cyril Richmond, Vice-Chairman-and Controller, Land Settlement Association.
- George Laurence Ritchie, Chief Engineer Officer, SS Strathmore, Peninsular & Oriental Steam Navigation Company.
- James Reginald Howard Roberts, Regional Co-ordinating Officer for Civil Defence Vehicles and Legal Adviser to the National Fire Service.
- Captain Owen Condor Roberts, Master, MV Australia Star, Blue Star Line Ltd.
- Percy Frederick Rogers, Director of Allocations of Tonnage, Ministry of War Transport.
- William Rowbotham, MBE, Head of the Health and Pensions Divisions, Ministry of National Insurance.
- Michael Edward Rowe, KC, lately Deputy-Secretary, War Damage Commission.
- Alfred Patrick Ryan, Controller (News), British Broadcasting Corporation.
- Richard Seymour, Deputy Secretary General, British Council.
- Franz Eugen Simon, PhD, FRS, Reader in Thermodynamics, University of Oxford.
- Frank Slator, Assistant Secretary, Ministry of Health.
- Joseph Smith, Chief Designer, Vickers-Armstrongs, Ltd. (Supermarine Works).
- Martin Pears Etherington-Smith, Chief Organiser and Manager of the Penny-a-Week Fund, Joint War Organisation of the British Red Cross Society and Order of St. John.
- Edward Watson Smyth, lately Principal Assistant Secretary, Ministry of Labour and National Service.
- Colonel Hugh Baird Spens, DSO, TD, DL, Chairman of the Glasgow Price Regulation Committee, Board of Trade.
- Charles Orr Stanley, OBE, Managing Director, Pye Radio Ltd.
- Hubert Granville Starley, Director and Sales Manager, Champion Sparking Plug Company.
- Colonel Alexander McKeand Steel, Chief Land Agent and Valuer, War Office.
- Thomas Stevenson, OBE, Chairman, Emergency Committee, Edinburgh.
- Mabel Elizabeth, Lady Stirling, OBE, JP, County President, Stirlingshire, British Red Cross Society.
- John Richard Nicholas Stone, Lately Chief Statistical Assistant, Offices of the Cabinet and Minister of Defence.
- Richard Stratton, Chairman of the Wiltshire War Agricultural Executive Committee.
- Rear-Admiral Sir Lionel Arthur Doveton Sturdee, Bt., Royal Navy (Retd.), Chief Telecommunications Censor, Postal and Telegraph Censorship Department.
- Percy John Rutty Tapp, MC, Director of Road Haulage, Ministry of War Transport.
- Frederick Thomas Tarry, OBE, Chief Constable, Southampton. For services to Civil Defence.
- Henry Thirkill, MC, Chairman of the Cambridge University Joint Recruiting Board.
- Louis Lionel Harry Thompson, Assistant Secretary, HM Treasury.
- Arthur Christopher Tibbits, MRCS, LRCP, DPH, County Medical Officer of Health, Nottinghamshire County Council. For services to Civil Defence.
- James William John Townley, AMIEE, Borough Electrical Engineer and-Manager, West Ham Corporation Electricity undertaking.
- Paul Cairn Vellacott, DSO, Lately Head of the Political and Psychological Warfare Department, Mediterranean Theatre.
- George Rudolph Volkert, Chief Designer, Handley Page Ltd.
- William Henry Waddams, Assistant Commissioner, and Secretary to, the Prison Commission.
- James Glencorse Wakelin, OBE, Secretary, Northern Lighthouse Board.
- John Frederick Walker, MBE, Manager, Constructive Department, HM Dockyard, Chatham.
- John Wallace, Commodore Chief Engineer Officer, British India Steam Navigation Company Ltd.
- William Kelly Wallace, Chief Civil Engineer, London, Midland & Scottish Railway Company.
- William Sympson Walters, Member, Central Price Regulation Committee, Board of Trade.
- Sydney Jeanetta Warner, OBE, Director, Foreign Relations Department, Joint War Organisation of the British Red Cross Society and Order of St. John.
- Walter Clark Warren, General Secretary, National Society of Electrotypers and Stereotypers.
- James Anderson Scott-Watson, MC, Chief Education Officer, Ministry of Agriculture and Fisheries.
- James Patson Watson, MInstCE, City Engineer, Plymouth. For services to Civil Defence.
- Samuel Watson, JP, Secretary, Durham Area, National Union of Mineworkers.
- Henry George Gordon Welch, Principal Assistant Secretary, Ministry of Information.
- James Laurence Wells, OBE, lately Secretary, Scottish Savings Committee.
- Bernard Clement Westall, Chairman and Managing Director, Thomas de la Rue Ltd.
- George Williams, Secretary, Industrial Life Offices Association.
- William Emrys Williams, Director of Army Bureau of Current Affairs, War Office.
- Wilfred William Hill-Wood, Director, Western Area, Postal and Telegraph Censorship Department.
- Reginald Stanley Worth, Chairman, Canners' Wartime Association.
- Cuthbert Edward Wrangham, Lately Principal Officer for Aircraft Equipment, Ministry of Aircraft Production.
- Ernest John Wright, OBE, Secretary, Finance Committee, Joint War Organisation of the British Red Cross Society and Order of St. John.
- Sir Basil Alfred Yeaxlee, OBE, PhD, Secretary, Central Advisory Council for Adult Education in HM Forces.
- Sydney Henry James Belither, British subject resident in the United States of America.
- Isaiah Berlin, British Information Services, Washington.
- Reginald Francis Doublet, British subject resident in Chile.
- Linton Harry Foulds, One of His Majesty's Consuls-General.
- Judge William Murray Graham Judge of the Egyptian Mixed Court of Appeal.
- Ronald Acott Hall, His Majesty's Consul-General at Canton.
- Edwyn Cecil Hole, His Majesty's Consul General at Smyrna.
- Ralph Olsburgh, British subject in Brazil.
- Gerald Holgate Selous, OBE, Counsellor (Commercial) at His Majesty's Legation at Berne.
- Robert Heatlie Scott, Director of Far East Bureau, Ministry of Information.
- Erroll Graham Sebastian, DSO, His Majesty's Consul-General at Antwerp.
- Ralph Henry Tottenham Smith, His Majesty's Consul-General at Paris.
- Clive Duncan Thompson, British subject resident in the Argentine Republic.
- George James Armstrong, OBE, Government Secretary and Deputy Resident Commissioner, Swaziland.
- Sir Leonard Wilfred James Costello, Chairman of the Committee of the King George and Queen Elizabeth Club, Exeter, under the auspices of the Empire Societies' War Hospitality Committee.
- John Maxwell Erskine, DL, JP, Chairman of the Committee of the King George and Queen Elizabeth Officers Club, Edinburgh, under the auspices of the Empire Societies' War Hospitality Committee.
- Frederick Falkener Fairthorne. For services in connection with patriotic movements in Launceston, State of Tasmania.
- James Francis Guthrie. For public services in the State of Victoria.
- David Hynd, OBE, MB, ChB, of the Raleigh Fitkin Mission Hospital, Bremersdorp, Swaziland, Territorial Director of the Swaziland Branch of the British Red Cross.
- William Francis Johns, Commissioner of Police, State of South Australia.
- Henry Telfer Low. For voluntary work as Chairman of the National War Fund, Southern Rhodesia.
- John Michael Mullens, JP, a Member of the Legislative Assembly, State of Victoria. For public and social welfare services.
- The Honourable Alfred James Pittard, a Member of the Legislative Council and of the Ballarat City Council, State of Victoria, for many years.
- James Haig Smith, OBE, lately Secretary for Posts and Telegraphs, and Chief Censor, Newfoundland.
- Captain Jack Turner, OBE, MC, Officer-in-Charge of the Newfoundland Forestry Unit in Scotland.
- Raja Shrimant Bhavanrao Shriniwasrao alias Bala Sahib, Pant Pratinidhi, Raja of Aundh.
- Margaret Eleanor, Lady Armstrong, MBE, Honorary Secretary, Joint War Charities, War Supply Depot, Madras.
- Lieutenant-Colonel Rustomji Bomanji Billi-Moria, Honorary Medical Specialist, Indian Military Hospital, Bombay.
- Cecil William Goyder, Chief Engineer, All-India Radio.
- Honorary Captain Khan Bahadur Malik-Muzaffar Khan, MBE, lately Member, Punjab Legislative Assembly, Sub-Registrar and Honorary Magistrate, Mianwali, Punjab.
- James Pomeroy Anderson, Controller of Rubber, Directorate-General of Supply, Government of India.
- Sydney Denham Chard, Controller of Raw Materials and Stores, Cotton Textile Industry, Government of India.
- Frederick Harry Moorhouse, Secretary and Treasurer, Imperial Bank of India, Calcutta, Bengal.
- Rameshwar Prasad Singh, MBE, Zamindar, Gaya District, Bihar.
- Harold Arthur Wilkinson, Senior Director, Begg Sutherland & Co. Ltd, Cawnpore, United Provinces.
- George Vance Allen, MD, BCh, Colonial Medical Service, Principal, College of Medicine, Singapore. For services during internment.
- Percy William Duncombe Armbrister, OBE For public services in the Bahamas.
- Alport Barker. For public services in Fiji.
- Rupert Cecil Bucquet, General Manager, Nyasaland Railways Limited, and Controller of Shipping and Railways, Nyasaland.
- Cyril Ernest Collinge. For services during internment in Malaya.
- Edward Baglietto Cottrell, OBE For public services in Gibraltar.
- Desmond William George Faris, MB, BS, MRCS, LRCP, Colonial Medical Service, Health Officer, Malaya. For services during internment.
- Harold Robert Leslie Fox, General Manager, Government Railway, Jamaica.
- Joseph Goldburg, Head of Finance Department, Crown Agents for the Colonies.
- Habib Kassimali Jaffer. For public services in Uganda.
- Lieutenant Commander James Jolly, RD, RNR. Harbour Master, Hong Kong. For services during internment.
- David Locke Newbigging, MC For services during internment in Hong Kong.
- Edward Charles Phillips, OBE For public services in Tanganyika.
- Arthur Russell Smee, Director of Public Works, Sierra Leone.
- The Right Reverend Bishop Leslie Gordon Vining, Bishop of Lagos.

Honorary Commander

- Yeta III, Paramount Chief of the Barotse, Northern Rhodesia.

==== Officer of the Order of the British Empire (OBE) ====
Military Division

Royal Navy

- Acting Lieutenant-Commander John McLaughlan Adams, Royal Australian Navy.
- Temporary Acting Lieutenant-Commander (E) George Darling Aitken, RINR.
- Assistant Constructor Lieutenant-Commander Ray Anscomb, RCNC.
- Acting Commander (S) David Armstrong.
- Temporary Commander James Stuart Bennett, RNVR.
- Temporary Acting Lieutenant-Commander (A) Stuart Wilson Birse, DSC, RNVR.
- Captain Reginald Harold Arthur Bond, Master, Merchant Navy.
- Commander Thomas Vallack Briggs.
- Lieutenant-Commander John Frederick Beaufoy Brown, DSC.
- Lieutenant-Commander (E) Maurice Nicholas de Cornier Brown.
- Temporary Acting Lieutenant-Commander (S) David Bruce, SANF(V).
- Commander Edwin Burling Clark, (Retd).
- The Reverend Charles Herbert Richard Cocup, Chaplain.
- Major (Acting Lieutenant-Colonel) Mark Harold Collett, MC, Royal Marines.
- Lieutenant-Commander John Corby, (Retd).
- Major (Acting Colonel) Richard Frank Cornwall, MBE, Royal Marines.
- Lieutenant-Commander William Alfred Crawford, Burma RNVR.
- Temporary Acting Lieutenant-Commander John Hector Davis, RNR.
- Commander (Sp.) Leslie Seymour Davis, RNVR.
- Surgeon Commander David Duncan, MD, ChB, DPH.
- Lieutenant-Commander James Lewis Dunkley, RD, RNR.
- Surgeon Lieutenant-Commander Frank Pollard Ellis, MB, ChB, MRCS, LRCP.
- Commander (S) Walter Bernard Charles Cooper Evans.
- Lieutenant-Commander (E) John Fitzsimmons, RNR (Retd).
- Commander Charles James Forlong, (Retd).
- Temporary Acting Commander (A) Edwin Alfred Richard Forwood, RNVR.
- Temporary Acting Lieutenant-Commander (Sp.) Vernon Judge Glassborow, RNVR.
- Temporary Lieutenant-Commander (A) Sir Giles Connop MacEachern Guthrie, Bt, DSC, RNVR.
- Temporary Lieutenant-Commander (Sp.) Lionel Hall, RNVR.
- Commander Richard Anthony Hall, (Retd).
- Commander Gerald Harper, (Retd).
- Commander Guy Christopher Harris, (Retd).
- Temporary Acting Lieutenant-Commander (E) Robert Cyril Hawkes, RNVR.
- Engineer Commander Stanley Francis Heraud, MBE, (Retd).
- Acting Captain (S) Jack Kenneth Highton.
- Commander Hugh Alfred Hill, RNR.
- Captain John Matthew Humphrey, DSO, Master, RFA.
- Acting Commander (S) Jack Hyde, RINVR.
- Acting Commander (S) Henry Ince.
- Temporary Acting Lieutenant-Commander (Sp.) Ralph William Burdick Izzard, RNVR.
- Commander Leslie Howard James.
- Temporary Lieutenant-Colonel Vernon Johnson, RME.
- Temporary Acting Lieutenant-Commander Leslie Arthur James Keeble, SANF(V).
- Acting Lieutenant-Commander David Walter Kirke.
- Commander (S) George Russell Lavers.
- Acting Engineer Commander Louis John Le Mesurier.
- Acting Commander Arthur Edmund Leveson, RNVR.
- Temporary Acting Commander (S) Henry Alec McGeorge, RINVR.
- Acting Commander James Cathal Boyd McManus, Royal Australian Navy.
- Anne McNeil, Chief Officer, WRNS.
- Commander (E) Aubrey Francis Fisher Menzies.
- Acting Temporary Lieutenant-Commander Festus Moffat, RNVR.
- Headmaster Commander George Harry Nicholls.
- Captain (Acting Lieutenant-Colonel) Frederick Henry Nicholson, Royal Marines.
- Patricia Dorothy Nye, Chief Officer, WRNS.
- Acting Commander (S) Ronald Thomas Owen.
- Audrey Faith Parker, Chief Officer, WRNS.
- Commander (S) Dennis Hathaway Pasmore, (Retd).
- Major (Acting Lieutenant-Colonel) Patrick William O'Hara Phibbs, Royal Marines.
- Acting Captain Bertie Cecil Porter, (Retd).
- Temporary Acting Surgeon Lieutenant-Commander Attracta Genevieve Rewcastle, MB, ChB, RNVR.
- Captain (Acting Lieutenant-Colonel) Norman Charles Ries, Royal Marines.
- Captain William Rosen, Master, RFA.
- Temporary Acting Captain (Sp.) Fred Ryden, RNVR.
- Acting Commander (S) Francis Eric Sanders.
- The Reverend William George Sandey, BA, Chaplain.
- Lieutenant-Commander Charles Thorold Scrimshaw, (Retd).
- Engineer Commander Frederick Bernard Secretan, (Retd).
- Temporary Commander (E) Charles Frederick Smith, MINA, RNR.
- Commander (E) Lancelot Edward Smith, (Retd).
- Temporary Acting Lieutenant-Commander (E) Sydney Park Smith, RNR.
- Commander (E) Walter Augustus Stewart.
- Commander Alyn Lee Taylor.
- The Reverend David John Thomas, Chaplain.
- Commander (E) Gilbert Henry Venables, DSO.
- Acting Commander Christopher Ryle Williams.
- Commander Hubert Malcolm Wilson, DSC.
- Temporary Acting Lieutenant-Commander John Worrall, RNR.
- Temporary Instructor Commander Ben Atkinson Wortley.
- Commander Thomas Yeoman, (Retd).

Army

- Lieutenant-Colonel (temporary) Horace Albert Ackland, FSI, (97543), Corps of Royal Engineers.
- Colonel (temporary) Jack Philipps Akerman, MC, Royal Indian Army Service Corps.
- Brevet Colonel George Ames, MC, TD, (20705), Royal Regiment of Artillery.
- Lieutenant-Colonel (temporary) Frederick George Arnold (31757), Army Dental Corps.
- Lieutenant-Colonel (temporary) William Briant Philip Pryce Aspinall (95924), Intelligence Corps.
- Lieutenant-Colonel Jeffrey Carlton Astwood, TD, Commander of (Bermuda Volunteer Rifle Corps.)
- Lieutenant-Colonel (temporary) Lawrence Francis Imbert Athill (4078), Royal Regiment of Artillery.
- Colonel (temporary) Eric Ensor Baker (107469), Royal Army Ordnance Corps.
- Lieutenant-Colonel Walter Mackie Balfour, DSO, Home Guard, Newfoundland.
- Lieutenant-Colonel (temporary) Henry Bardsley (25694), Royal Army Service Corps.
- Lieutenant-Colonel (acting) Esmond Baring (92679), 4th County of London Yeomanry, Royal Armoured Corps.
- Lieutenant-Colonel Edward Francis Moulton-Barrett, Commandant of Jamaica Home Guard.
- Colonel (temporary) Alfred David Bateman (128946), Royal Army Ordnance Corps.
- Colonel (acting) Walter Hugh Beak (14585), Royal Tank Regiment, Royal Armoured Corps.
- Lieutenant-Colonel (temporary) Shiv Parshad Bhatia (Z-8569), Indian Army Medical Corps.
- Colonel (temporary) Reginald Bicat (163088), Corps of Royal Engineers.
- Lieutenant-Colonel (temporary) John Hardman Blackburn, TD, (47499), The King's Shropshire Light Infantry.
- Brigadier (temporary) Travers Robert Blackley (125765), General List.
- Lieutenant-Colonel (temporary) Herbert James-Blewett (78717), Royal Army Service Corps.
- Colonel (temporary) Richard Frank Bonallack (104497), Royal Electrical and Mechanical Engineers.
- Lieutenant-Colonel (temporary) George Clement Malcolm Bone, MIMechE, (37647), Corps of Royal Engineers.
- Lieutenant-Colonel (temporary) Edgar Bower (86455), Royal Army Ordnance Corps.
- Lieutenant-Colonel (temporary) Edward William Bower (87957), Royal Regiment of Artillery.
- Lieutenant-Colonel Frederick Bower-Alcock (131178), The Lancashire Fusiliers.
- Brigadier (temporary) Thomas Walker Boyce, MC, MM, (A.I.552), 14th Punjab Regiment, Indian Army.
- Colonel Edward Bradney, DSO, (5117), late Corps of Royal Engineers.
- Lieutenant-Colonel (temporary) the Rev. Frank Shrewsbury Briggs, Indian Ecclesiastical Department.
- Lieutenant-Colonel (temporary) Gordon Hepburn Forrest Broad (176860), Army Educational Corps.
- Lieutenant-Colonel (temporary) Robert Straton Broke, MC, (56154), Royal Regiment of Artillery.
- Colonel (temporary) Arthur Allen Broomfield, MC, (I.A.626), Royal Indian Army Service Corps.
- Lieutenant-Colonel (temporary) Robert Nigel Beresford Dalrymple Bruce (50040), The King's Royal Rifle Corps.
- Lieutenant-Colonel (temporary) Christopher Haworth Burne (43855), Intelligence Corps.
- Lieutenant-Colonel Anthony George Bernard Burney (121910), Royal Army Service Corps.
- Lieutenant-Colonel (temporary) Frederick Arthur Burridge, MBE, (74954), Extra Regimentally Employed List.
- Colonel (acting) Hugh Wheler Bush (14323), Corps of Royal Engineers.
- Lieutenant-Colonel (temporary) William George Bushby (181819), Corps of Royal Engineers.
- Lieutenant-Colonel (temporary) Raymond Leslie Carpenter (I.A.1094), Indian Electrical and Mechanical Engineers.
- Lieutenant-Colonel Robert Charles Carrington (103481), General List.
- Lieutenant-Colonel (temporary) Francis Leo Carroll (127522), Corps of Royal Engineers.
- Lieutenant-Colonel (temporary) Leslie John Carver (94782), The Cheshire Regiment.
- Colonel (temporary) John Chiene (26518), The Royal Scots (The Royal Regiment).
- Lieutenant-Colonel (temporary) Patrick Fisher Claxton (68519), Royal Army Service Corps.
- Colonel (temporary) James Boa Cochrane (764.I.A.), Indian Electrical and Mechanical Engineers.
- Colonel (temporary) David Henry Cole, MBE, MA, Litt.D. (10135), Army Educational Corps.
- Lieutenant-Colonel (temporary) George Sinclair Cole (52577), Royal Regiment of Artillery.
- Lieutenant-Colonel (temporary) Joseph Hyman Collins (190825), Royal Regiment of Artillery.
- Lieutenant-Colonel (temporary) Harry Stewart Cooper (402), The Border Regiment.
- Lieutenant-Colonel (temporary) Charles Morris Corner, MVO, (102774), Intelligence Corps.
- Colonel (temporary) John Francis Cottrell, MC, (107588), Royal Army Ordnance Corps.
- Lieutenant-Colonel (temporary) Gordon Gerard Cox-Cox, TD, (15173), The Staffordshire Yeomanry, Royal Armoured Corps.
- Lieutenant-Colonel Henry Abner Craine, MC, (911.I.A.), Indian Army Ordnance Corps.
- Colonel (acting) Sidney Charles Rigby Dale, TD, (39961), The Hampshire Regiment.
- Lieutenant-Colonel (temporary) Cyril Edmond Dardier (26536), Royal Regiment of Artillery.
- Lieutenant-Colonel (temporary) Francis Hugh Ranson Davey (28079), Army Dental Corps.
- Colonel (temporary) Ronald Henry Deakin (91118), The Royal Warwickshire Regiment.
- Lieutenant-Colonel Geoffrey Ronald Hawtrey Deane (6578), Corps of Royal Engineers.
- Lieutenant-Colonel (temporary) George Dudley De'Ath, MC, (8166), Corps of Royal Engineers.
- Lieutenant-Colonel (temporary) Basil Lingard Deed (51792), Intelligence Corps.
- Lieutenant-Colonel (local) Jack Edward De La Motte (100094), Royal Army Pay Corps.
- Lieutenant-Colonel (temporary) Harold Anthony Denison, MC, (98223), Pioneer Corps.
- Lieutenant-Colonel Kenneth George Gordon Dennys, The Somerset Light Infantry (Prince Albert's), Officer Commanding Windward Islands Garrison.
- Colonel (temporary) William Harry Noel Dent (1272), Royal Corps of Signals.
- Lieutenant-Colonel Colville Montgomery Deverell (318186), General List.
- Colonel (acting) Jack Donald de Wilton (772.I.A.), Royal Indian Army Service Corps.
- Lieutenant-Colonel (temporary) Ronald William Diggens (53275), Corps of Royal Engineers.
- Lieutenant-Colonel (temporary) Reginald Hugh Dowler (241969), Intelligence Corps.
- Lieutenant-Colonel (temporary) Paul Arthur Austin D'Oyly (18315), The Devonshire Regiment.
- Colonel (temporary) John Drummond Deane-Drummond, DSO, MC, (E.C.12070), Indian Pioneer Corps.
- The Reverend Thomas Francis Duggan, MC, MA, (144948), Chaplain to the Forces, Third Class (temporary), Royal Army Chaplain's Department.
- Lieutenant-Colonel (temporary) John Robert Dunkeld (136168), The Argyll and Sutherland Highlanders (Princess Louise's).
- Lieutenant-Colonel (temporary) John William Dunn, TD, (7358), Corps of Royal Engineers.
- Lieutenant-Colonel (temporary) Noel Randolph Beaumont Eddowes (5651), Royal Regiment of Artillery.
- Lieutenant-Colonel (temporary) Robin Jamieson Elles, MBE, (147603), General List.
- Lieutenant-Colonel (temporary) Marshall John William Ellingworth, DSM, (79698), Royal Corps of Signals.
- Lieutenant-Colonel (temporary) Gerald Essame (91266), Royal Regiment of Artillery.
- Lieutenant-Colonel (temporary) James Henry Ewing, BA, (120800), Corps of Royal Engineers.
- Colonel (temporary) David Mackay Findlay, MC, (20372), Royal Regiment of Artillery.
- Lieutenant-Colonel Frank Leslie Fowden, TD, (2152), The Manchester Regiment.
- Colonel (temporary) Charles Ewan Frazer (88705), Royal Regiment of Artillery.
- Colonel Jasper Gray Frere, DSO, MC, (9586), late The Suffolk Regiment.
- Colonel (temporary) Edward Keith Bryne Furze, DSO, MC, (1252), Army Educational Corps.
- Lieutenant-Colonel (temporary) Kenneth James Garner Garner-Smith (23305), The Seaforth Highlanders (Ross-shire Buffs, The Duke of Albany's).
- Brigadier (temporary) Philip Horatio Gates (21605), The Lincolnshire Regiment.
- Lieutenant-Colonel (temporary) Harvey MacLellan Gillespie (12187), The King's Own Scottish Borderers.
- Lieutenant-Colonel (temporary) Percy William Goodhind (100972), Extra Regimentally Employed List.
- Colonel (temporary) Mervyn Clive Theodore Gompertz, Royal Indian Army Service Corps.
- Colonel Kenneth Arthur Gosnell (I.A.851), Indian Army.
- Lieutenant-Colonel (temporary) Sir John Reginald Noble Graham, Bt., VC, (99671), The Argyll and Sutherland Highlanders (Princess Louise's).
- Colonel (temporary) Kenneth Carrodus Gray (103538), Royal Army Ordnance Corps.
- Lieutenant-Colonel (temporary) Stephen Bernard Rylands Green (45089), The Oxfordshire, and Buckinghamshire Light Infantry.
- Brigadier (temporary) Ivor Reginald Grove (76593), Royal Army Ordnance Corps.
- Lieutenant-Colonel (temporary) William Kenneth Mackenzie Guild (21129), The Black Watch (Royal Highland Regiment).
- Lieutenant-Colonel (temporary) Donald Harry Ward Hall (130070), The Loyal Regiment (North Lancashire).
- Colonel (acting) Ernest Hamilton Hall, MB, (36782), Royal Army Medical Corps.
- Lieutenant-Colonel (temporary) James Hubert Hall (72298), Royal Regiment of Artillery.
- Lieutenant-Colonel (temporary) George Ronald Hargreaves (128236), Royal Army Medical Corps.
- Lieutenant-Colonel (temporary) William Herbert Hargreaves, MRCP, (53383), Royal Army Medical Corps.
- Lieutenant-Colonel Harry Peter Hart, MC, (24077), Royal Corps of Signals.
- Major (temporary) Gilbert Mallalieu Haworth (50720), The Gordon Highlanders.
- Lieutenant-Colonel (temporary) Hugh Alan Heber-Percy (180019V), South African Forces.
- Colonel (temporary) Alfred Heilbut (104739), Royal Army Ordnance Corps.
- Lieutenant-Colonel (temporary) Henry Harold Hemming, MC, (108342), Royal Regiment of Artillery.
- Colonel (local) John Rochfort Armstrong Henry (130.I.A.), Indian Army.
- Colonel Gilbert Henry Hinds (366), late Royal Regiment of Artillery.
- Lieutenant-Colonel (temporary) Charles Richard Hodgson (104634), Extra Regimentally Employed List.
- Lieutenant-Colonel (temporary) Kenneth Weir Hogg (9625), Irish Guards.
- Lieutenant-Colonel (temporary) Irvine Sapte Hogge (13263), Royal Army Pay Corps.
- Lieutenant-Colonel Charles Eric Palgrave Hooker, The Highland Light Infantry (City of Glasgow Regiment), Officer Commanding British Guiana Garrison of South Caribbean Forces.
- Colonel (temporary) Frank Horlington, TD, (22321), Royal Regiment of Artillery.
- Colonel (temporary) Henry Jonathan Hosie, AMIMechE, (60435), Royal Electrical and Mechanical Engineers.
- Colonel (temporary) Maurice Brian Humphreys (314.I.A.), Army Remount Department in India.
- Colonel (temporary) Alfred John Matthew Hunt, MBE, (85196), Royal Army Ordnance Corps.
- Lieutenant-Colonel (temporary) James Irons (113074), The Black Watch (Royal Highland Regiment).
- Colonel (temporary) Frederick Arthur Ironside (104245), Royal Army Ordnance Corps.
- Lieutenant-Colonel (temporary) Albert Percy Jackson (152913), Pioneer Corps.
- Lieutenant-Colonel (temporary) Frederick Jebens (9414), The South Lancashire Regiment (The Prince of Wales's Volunteers).
- Lieutenant-Colonel (acting) Robert Rudolf Verner-Jeffreys, Indian Electrical and Mechanical Engineers.
- Major (temporary) Walter Frederick Jepson, PhD, Royal Army Medical Corps, Officer-in-Charge, Malaria Control Board, Mauritius.
- Lieutenant-Colonel (temporary) Rowland Oswald Jermyn (I.A.682), 2nd Punjab Regiment, Indian Army.
- Lieutenant-Colonel (temporary) Owen Haddon Wansbrough-Jones, MBE, (115421), Corps of Royal Engineers.
- Lieutenant-Colonel Daniel James Keating, MC, (14023), The East Yorkshire Regiment (The Duke of York's Own).
- Controller Margaret Olive Kent (W.A.C.25), Women's Auxiliary Corps (India).
- Lieutenant-Colonel (temporary) Louis Thornley King (49518), The Somerset Light Infantry (Prince Albert's).
- Lieutenant-Colonel (temporary) Edward Julian Cowan King-Salter, DSO, (17903), The Rifle Brigade (Prince Consort's Own).
- Lieutenant-Colonel (temporary) George Lament Kinnear (E.G.2159), Corps of Indian Engineers.
- Chief Commander (temporary) Maude Flavel Kyd (192082), Auxiliary Territorial Service.
- Lieutenant-Colonel (temporary) John Cuthbert Laing (109049), The East Yorkshire Regiment (The Duke of York's Own).
- Colonel (temporary) Albert Percy Lambooy (12085), Royal Regiment of Artillery.
- Lieutenant-Colonel Ernest Stewart Law, TD, (22426), Royal Regiment of Artillery.
- Colonel (temporary) Roderick Gwynne Lawrence (40396), 4th/7th Royal Dragoon Guards, Royal Armoured Corps.
- Lieutenant-Colonel (temporary) Geoffrey Laws (97536), Corps of Royal Engineers.
- Lieutenant-Colonel Laban Lesster (642.I.A.), Royal Indian Army Service Corps.
- Controller (temporary) Dorothy Clare Liardet (192074), Auxiliary Territorial Service.
- Lieutenant-Colonel (temporary) Harry Laidman Lister, TD, (32729), Royal Regiment of Artillery.
- Lieutenant-Colonel (temporary) George Joseph Long (152417), Royal Tank Regiment, Royal Armoured Corps.
- Lieutenant-Colonel (temporary) Sidney Walter Longhurst, Intelligence Corps (India).
- Lieutenant-Colonel (temporary) John Lucy (22054), The Royal Ulster Rifles.
- Colonel (temporary) Frederick Hugh Maclennan, AMIMechE, (31580), Corps of Royal Engineers.
- Lieutenant-Colonel Paul Herbert Macklin (17085), The Queen's Own Royal West Kent Regiment.
- Brigadier (temporary) Patrick Holberton Man, MC, (58144), The Hampshire Regiment.
- Colonel (acting) Walter Edward Alfred Manning (135787), Corps of Royal Engineers.
- Brigadier John Harold Harden, Bahawalpur State Forces, Indian States Forces.
- Lieutenant-Colonel (temporary) Thomas Leopold. Marks (45230), The Middlesex Regiment (Duke of Cambridge's Own).
- Lieutenant-Colonel (acting) Robert Leckie Marshall, MA, (117459), Army Educational Corps.
- Colonel (temporary) Ronald Martin (P.5952), Indian Army Ordnance Corps.
- Lieutenant-Colonel (temporary) William McAndrew (33002), Army Dental Corps.
- Lieutenant-Colonel William James McArthur (89207), Royal Regiment of Artillery.
- Colonel (temporary) Archibald George McDonald, TD, BSc(Eng.), AMInstCE, AMIEE, (32055), Royal Electrical and Mechanical Engineers.
- Lieutenant-Colonel (temporary) Arthur John McPhail, TD, (98182), Intelligence Corps.
- Lieutenant-Colonel (temporary) Keith Graham Menzies, MC, (21169), Welsh Guards.
- Lieutenant-Colonel (temporary) John Theodore Milner (13093), The Worcestershire Regiment.
- Lieutenant-Colonel (temporary) The Honourable Alick Burdett Money-Coutts (92690), The Royal Scots Fusiliers.
- Brigadier (temporary) Cuthbert Grafton Moore, BEng, (25090), Royal Corps of Signals.
- Lieutenant-Colonel (temporary) John Patrick Moreton, MC, (11329), 1st King's Dragoon Guards, Royal Armoured Corps.
- Lieutenant-Colonel (temporary) Harry Douglas Muggeridge (125606), Royal Army Ordnance Corps.
- Lieutenant-Colonel (temporary) Henry Oscar Murton (63066), The Royal Northumberland Fusiliers.
- Colonel (local) Walter Joseph Nance, Indian Regular Reserve of Officers.
- Lieutenant-Colonel (temporary) Eric Duncan Newell, ED, (I.A. 983), 7th Rajput Regiment, Indian Army.
- Lieutenant-Colonel (temporary) Thomas Vernon Nicholson (94841), Corps of Royal Engineers.
- Chief Commander (temporary) Helen Nimmo (192081), Auxiliary Territorial Service.
- Lieutenant-Colonel (temporary) Mark Richard Norman (88581), Royal Regiment of Artillery.
- Lieutenant-Colonel (temporary) Sidney Guy Notley, MC, (119184), Royal Regiment of Artillery.
- Colonel (local) Cyril Tate O'Callaghan, MC, (11737), 10th Royal Hussars (Prince of Wales's Own), Royal Armoured Corps.
- Lieutenant-Colonel (temporary) John O'Dwyer (31586), Corps of Royal Engineers.
- Lieutenant-Colonel (temporary) Ernest Nugent Oldrey (52671), Royal Regiment of Artillery.
- Lieutenant-Colonel (temporary) Frank Leslie Orme (27600), Royal Regiment of Artillery.
- Lieutenant-Colonel Robert Leslie Owen, TD, (28903), The Cheshire Regiment.
- Brevet Colonel Reginald Papworth, TD, (2015), The Queen's Royal Regiment (West Surrey).
- Lieutenant-Colonel (temporary) Charles Guy Wyndham Parker (17235), Royal Army Service Corps.
- Lieutenant-Colonel Eric Leonard Wilkieson Parker (79238), Royal Regiment of Artillery.
- Lieutenant-Colonel George Mutlow Paterson, The King's African Rifles.
- Major Reginald Grant Paterson, MC, Newfoundland Regiment.
- Lieutenant-Colonel (temporary) Arthur Victor Petri (5678), The East Surrey Regiment.
- Lieutenant-Colonel Henry Joscelin Phillimore (109818), Royal Regiment of Artillery.
- Lieutenant-Colonel John Curtis Porter, ED, (31527), New Zealand Military Forces.
- Lieutenant-Colonel Harold Arthur Shaddack Pressey, MC, (4245), Corps of Royal Engineers.
- Lieutenant-Colonel (temporary) Alan Priestman (157381), The Highland Light Infantry (City of Glasgow Regiment).
- Lieutenant-Colonel (temporary) Frank. Joseph James Prior (111213), Corps of Royal Engineers.
- Lieutenant-Colonel (temporary) Edward Stephen Purcell (71160), The Hampshire Regiment.
- Lieutenant-Colonel (temporary) Robert Derwent Hamilton Radcliffe (28305), The Dorsetshire Regiment.
- Lieutenant-Colonel (temporary) Robert Fitzgerald Raikes (I.A.650), 15th Punjab Regiment, Indian Army.
- Brigadier (temporary) Thomas Strelky Rennie (10831), Royal Regiment of Artillery.
- Colonel (acting) Graham Richmond, MC, (26810), Pioneer Corps.
- Lieutenant-Colonel (temporary) Ernest Michael Robinson, TD, (36397), Royal Regiment of Artillery.
- Colonel (acting) Edward Patrick John Ryan (E.C.607), Indian Army.
- Lieutenant-Colonel (temporary) John Walker Sale (28354), The West Yorkshire Regiment (The Prince of Wales's Own).
- Brigadier (local) Bernard Edward Schlesinger, MD, FRCP, (96858), Royal Army Medical Corps.
- Colonel (temporary) Francis James Scott, MC, (1914), 4th/7th Royal Dragoon Guards, Royal Armoured Corps.
- Lieutenant-Colonel (temporary) John George Ernest Scott (76445), The Leicestershire Regiment.
- Brigadier (temporary) Arthur Sewell (106279), Royal Army Ordnance Corps.
- Colonel (acting) Edgar Donald Reid Shearer (73353), Royal Regiment of Artillery.
- Lieutenant-Colonel (acting) Sidney Henry Short (280709), Army Cadet Force.
- Lieutenant-Colonel (temporary) Aubrey Oswald Sibbald, MBE, (66604), Extra Regimentally Employed List.
- Lieutenant-Colonel (temporary) David Charles Stranach Sinclair (30931), The Royal Berkshire Regiment (Princess Charlotte of Wales's).
- Lieutenant-Colonel (temporary) William Angus Sinclair (36075), Royal Regiment of Artillery.
- Brigadier (temporary) Andrew Skeen (34924), The Royal Berkshire Regiment (Princess Charlotte of Wales's).
- Lieutenant-Colonel (temporary) Alfred Thomas Smith (106861), Royal Army Ordnance Corps.
- Major Harry Alston Smith, Commissioner of Police, Basutoland.
- Lieutenant-Colonel (temporary) Stanley Charles Smith (65867), 16th/5th Lancers, Royal Armoured Corps.
- Lieutenant-Colonel (temporary) Henry Benson Somerville, BEng, MIEE, (38841), Royal Corps of Signals.
- Colonel (temporary) John Southern (100982), Royal Army Ordnance Corps.
- The Reverend Horatio Sandys Cumby Spurrier, TD, (39202), Chaplain to the Forces, Second Class (temporary), Royal Army Chaplains' Department.
- Chaplain to the Forces 1st Class The Rev. William Stephenson, MA, Indian Ecclesiastical Establishment.
- Lieutenant-Colonel (temporary) Pat Adam Stewart, MB, (24745), Royal Army Medical Corps.
- Lieutenant-Colonel (temporary) John Edward Stracey Stone (58134), The East Lancashire Regiment.
- Colonel (temporary) Alfred Swindale, TD, MB, (28990), RoyalArmy Medical Corps.
- Lieutenant-Colonel Alan Cecil Tarnow, AMIMechE, (36837), Royal Electrical and Mechanical Engineers.
- Colonel (temporary) Andrew Copeland Taylor, Indian Army Medical Corps.
- Colonel (temporary) Jack Hulme Taylor (I.A.83), Probyn's Horse, Indian Armoured Corps.
- Colonel (temporary) Geoffrey Gordon Templer (I.A.969), Indian Army Ordnance Corps.
- Lieutenant-Colonel (temporary) Hugh Wyndham Vaughan Thomas (91133), Royal Corps of Signals.
- Lieutenant-Colonel (temporary) Gordon William Powell Thorn (17699), The King's Regiment (Liverpool).
- Colonel (acting) Colin Norman Thornton-Kemsley (33218), Royal Regiment of Artillery.
- Controller (acting) Hope Alice Toft (192042), Auxiliary Territorial Service.
- Lieutenant-Colonel (temporary) Wilfrid Lewis Tolputt, MC, (5751), The Royal Irish Fusiliers (Princess Victoria's).
- Lieutenant-Colonel (temporary) Robert Percy Tong (52362), The Queen's Own Royal West Kent Regiment.
- Lieutenant-Colonel (temporary) Eric Lansdown Trist (231161), General List.
- Lieutenant-Colonel (temporary) Frederick Laughlan Turnbull, MIMechE, (70968), Royal Electrical and Mechanical Engineers.
- Chief Commander (temporary) Mary Joan Caroline Tyrwhitt (192895), Auxiliary Territorial Service.
- Lieutenant-Colonel (temporary) Michael Noel Varvill, MC, (122903), Corps of Royal Engineers.
- Lieutenant-Colonel (temporary) Victor George Vella (168505), The King's Own Malta Regiment.
- Lieutenant-Colonel (temporary) Herbert Guy Virtue (37010), Honourable Artillery Company.
- Brigadier (temporary) Charles Gordon Campbell Wade, MBE, (87), The Royal Fusiliers (City of London Regiment).
- Lieutenant-Colonel (temporary) Robert Redvers Walker, MBE, (76105), Royal Regiment of Artillery.
- Lieutenant-Colonel (temporary) Alfred Arthur Walter (E.G. 11182), Indian Army.
- Colonel (temporary) Daniel Hateley Warren (97891), Royal Army Ordnance Corps.
- Lieutenant-Colonel (acting) Ronald Reginald Waugh (E.G. 1129), Indian Army.
- Lieutenant-Colonel Lewis John Wayman, TD, (26744), General List.
- Brevet Colonel Cyril Hackett Wilkinson, MC, (33444), General List.
- Lieutenant-Colonel (local) Edward Watkin Williams-Wynn (40680), Royal Regiment of Artillery.
- Lieutenant-Colonel (temporary) John Frederick Earle D'Anyers Willis (166230), Royal Regiment of Artillery.
- Lieutenant-Colonel (temporary) Nigel Addington Willis (13959), The Queen's Royal Regiment (West Surrey).
- Colonel (temporary) Hugh Walker Wilson (56878), 14th London Regiment (London Scottish).
- Major (temporary) Thomas Cyril Wilson (159582), General List.
- Lieutenant-Colonel (temporary) Albertine Winner, MD, MRCP, (147507), Royal Army Medical Corps.
- Chief Commander (temporary) Caroline Elizabeth Winterbottom (192996), Auxiliary Territorial Service.
- Lieutenant-Colonel (temporary) Leslie Winterbottom (119314), Intelligence Corps.
- Colonel (temporary) Donald Solomon Woolf (161035), Royal Army Ordnance Corps.
- Colonel (temporary) Hugh Morland Wright (22909), Royal Army Service Corps.

Royal Air Force

- Air Commodore Bertram Frederick Johnson, RCAF.
- Group Captain Thomas Eaton Hornby Birley, RAFVR.
- Group Captain John Frederick Bromley, RAFVR.
- Group Captain Geoffrey Mungo Buxton.
- Group Captain Albert Frederick Cook.
- Group Captain Neill Charles Ogilvie-Forbes.
- Group Captain Alfred Vavasour Hammond.
- Group Captain Guy Wingfield Hayes.
- Group Captain Philip Haynes, DFC.
- Group Captain Maurice Lionel Heath.
- Group Captain James MacConnell Kilpatrick, MB, BCh, DPH.
- Group Captain Claude Raymond Dixen Lewis Lloyd.
- Group Captain Ian Robertson Parker, AAF.
- Group Captain Kenneth Frederick Travis Pickles.
- Group Captain John Henry Powle.
- Group Captain Walter Charles Sheen, DSO.
- Group Captain Francis Alexander Roy Smith.
- Group Captain Duncan Macdonald Somerville.
- Group Captain Robert Arthur Terrence Stowell, DFC.
- Group Captain John Mortimer Warfield.
- Group Captain John Horton Woodin.
- Acting Group Captain The Viscount Acheson.
- Acting Group Captain Colin Carstairs Bell, RAAF.
- Acting Group Captain Alfred Mulock Bentley, AFC.
- Acting Group Captain Alan Coatsworth Brown, DSO, DFC, Reserve of Air Force Officers.
- Acting Group Captain Lewis George Burnand, DFC, RAFO.
- Acting Group Captain Robert John Barrow Burns, RAFO.
- Acting Group Captain Brian Spencer Cartmel.
- Acting Group Captain Ernest Shakespeare Borthwick-Clarke.
- Acting Group Captain William Corden.
- Acting Group Captain James Stanley Curtis, RAFO.
- Acting Group Captain Victor Fairfield.
- Acting Group Captain Edward James Fawdrey, RAFVR.
- Acting Group Captain Samuel Denys Felkin, MBE, RAFVR.
- Acting Group Captain John Nicholson Jaques.
- Acting Group Captain Rex Laughton Kippenberger.
- Acting Group Captain John Stuart Laird, RAFO.
- Acting Group Captain John McLaren, RAFVR.
- Acting Group Captain Arthur Deane Nesbitt, DFC, RCAF.
- Acting Group Captain Leslie Ralph Ridley.
- Acting Group Captain Harold Martin Russell.
- Acting Group Captain Charles Edward Ramsay Tait, DFC.
- Acting Group Captain Charles William Brabazon Urmston, RAFVR.
- Acting Group Captain Eugene Emile Vielle.
- Wing Commander James Francis Henry Adams (72421), RAFVR.
- Wing Commander Oliver Charles Barnett (77193), RAFVR.
- Wing Commander Graham Leonard William Boswell (41104), RAFO.
- Wing Commander James Alan Chorlton (33230).
- Wing Commander Wallace Bernard Cleveland (Can/C.2017), RCAF.
- Wing Commander Alfred William Coe (35044).
- Wing Commander Brian George Corry, DFC, (90033), AAF Reserve of Officers.
- Wing Commander Michael Nicholson Crossley, DSO, DFC, (37554), RAFO.
- Wing Commander John Stewart Darrant (43500).
- Wing Commander Leslie Davey (35101).
- Wing Commander Benedict Oliver Dias (39185), RAFO.
- Wing Commander Hugh Richard Ford Dyer, DFC, (Can/J.5699), RCAF.
- Wing Commander Archibald James Edmunds (70199).
- Wing Commander John Vincent Edwards (75205), RAFVR.
- Wing Commander Robert William Edwards (03232), RAFVR.
- Wing Commander Anthony John Elliott (37469), RAFO.
- Wing Commander Francis Everard Everard (73573), RAFVR.
- Wing Commander Robert Arthur Foggin (72832).
- Wing Commander Austin James Esslemont Forsyth (72833), RAFVR.
- Wing Commander Edward Harry Free (31057).
- Wing Commander Horace Furner (35117).
- Wing Commander Frederick Percy Gee (31149).
- Wing Commander Joseph Hollie Giguere (Can/C.1997), RCAF.
- Wing Commander Michael Graham (71189), RAFVR.
- Wing Commander Ralph Washington Gray (72234), RAFVR.
- Wing Commander Eversley Bernard Green, MC, (04030).
- Wing Commander Jeaffreson Herbert Greswell, DSO, DFC, (37318), RAFO.
- Wing Commander Arthur Ernest Haes (21139).
- Wing Commander Thomas Henry Cope Hampton (31477).
- Wing Commander Stanley Arthur Hargrove (79464), RAFVR.
- Wing Commander Andrew Dill Henderson (Aus.217), RAAF.
- Wing Commander Richard Arthur Clinton Holme (87632), RAFVR.
- Wing Commander Andrew Keith Hunter (36113).
- Wing Commander Douglas Verity Hutton (Can/C.4088), RCAF.
- Wing Commander Clifford George James (77391), RAFVR.
- Wing Commander Harry Patrick Johnston (35203).
- Wing Commander Clarence Oswald King (Can/C.2543), RCAF.
- Wing Commander Charles Denis Layers, MBE, (39118), RAFO.
- Wing Commander John Clive Lawrence (74279), RAFVR.
- Wing Commander Henry Frederick Levell (31096).
- Wing Commander Joseph Gluckstein Links (90439), AAF.
- Wing Commander Ronald Ernest William Little (72308), RAFVR.
- Wing Commander Clifford Longstaff (45030).
- Wing Commander Lionel George Martin (22200).
- Wing Commander Geoffrey Denis Middleton (19057).
- Wing Commander Charles Howard Goulden Millis, DSO, MC, (80649), RAFVR.
- Wing Commander Alan Lennox Thomson Naish (24101), RAFO.
- Wing Commander Leonard William Norman (70505), RAFO.
- Wing Commander Louis Paul O'Connor (35386).
- Wing Commander Herbert Cecil Orr (88349), RAFVR.
- Wing Commander Thomas Campbell Parker (70812).
- Wing Commander Richard John Bennett Pearse (78521), RAFVR.
- Wing Commander Peter Theodore Philpott (33172).
- Wing Commander Alexander Frank Powell (27141).
- Wing Commander Grahame Pryce Rawlings (83387), RAFVR.
- Wing Commander Walter Ridley (73541), RAFVR.
- Wing Commander The Honourable Edward Wriothsley Curzon Russell (76352), RAFVR.
- Wing Commander Arthur Ernest Saunders (37052), RAFO.
- Wing Commander John Prestbury Scorgie, BEM, (31189), Royal Air Force,
- Wing Commander Eric Andrews Simson, AFC, (72939), RAFVR.
- Wing Commander Arthur William Smith (10052).
- Wing Commander Leonard Spencer (35137).
- Wing Commander John Rohrer Sumner (Can/C.971), RCAF.
- Wing Commander Frank Susans, MBE, (13044).
- Wing Commander Sidney Charles Sutton (43636).
- Wing Commander William Greene Swanborough (35008).
- Wing Commander Edward Frederick Wain (22179), RAFO.
- Wing Commander Harold Walker (19040).
- Wing Commander Norman Wallett (21183).
- Wing Commander Ian Walters, Southern Rhodesia Air Force.
- Wing Commander Laurence Anthony Wear (31188).
- Wing Commander William Lawson Whitlock (74855), RAFVR.
- Wing Commander Vincent Toullerton Williams (77331), RAFVR.
- Wing Commander Harold Wright, MBE, (35250).
- Lieutenant-Colonel George Stephen James (102504V), SAAF.
- Lieutenant-Colonel Dennis Royden Clyde-Morley (P.102689V). SAAF.
- Lieutenant-Colonel Eric Blackford Woodrow, MC, (102994V), SAAF.
- Acting Wing Commander Ronald George Hinings Adams (76367), RAFVR.
- Acting Wing Commander Anthony Kenway Allen (83141), RAFVR.
- Acting Wing Commander Frank Anderson (10021).
- Acting Wing Commander Athol Eric Arnott (31417), RAFO.
- Acting Wing Commander Henry Edward Arthur (43311).
- Acting Wing Commander Graham Walter Beech Austin, AFC, (90258), AAF.
- Acting Wing Commander Harry Ralph Baker (86835), RAFVR.
- Acting Wing Commander Leonard Ralph Batten (82319), RAFVR.
- Acting Wing Commander Ronald Berry, DSO, DFC, (78538), RAFVR.
- Acting Wing Commander Henry Desmond Bisley, AFC, (43057).
- Acting Wing Commander Henry Loveday Bosworth (79076), RAFVR.
- Acting Wing Commander Richard Henry Corthorn Brousson (73102), RAFVR.
- Acting Wing Commander Stuart Edward Allen Brown (39121), RAFO.
- Acting Wing Commander Norman Albert Burt (40601), RAFO.
- Acting Wing Commander Derek Dudley Martin Butcher (42047), RAFO.
- Acting Wing Commander Ernest Rowland Butcher (744642). Royal Air Force.
- Acting Wing Commander Sydney Campling (43606).
- Acting Wing Commander Arthur William Caswell (44092).
- Acting Wing Commander William Albert Cole (108249), RAFVR.
- Acting Wing Commander John Charles Corby (70139).
- Acting Wing Commander Norman Charles Cordingly, MBE, (88974), RAFVR.
- Acting Wing Commander Gordon Jeffrey Craig (74788), RAFVR.
- Acting Wing Commander Leslie George Downton Croft (89641), RAFVR.
- Acting Wing Commander Sidney Edward Thomas Cusdin (85456), RAFVR.
- Acting Wing Commander Henry Maxwell Dalston Davis (75769), RAFVR.
- Acting Wing Commander Alan Christopher Deere, DSO, DFC, (40370), RAFO.
- Acting Wing Commander George Dalginross Deuchars (43797).
- Acting Wing Commander Edwin Donovan, MB, ChB, (23139), RAFO.
- Acting Wing Commander Archibald Hugh Drummond (60827), RAFVR.
- Acting Wing Commander Lindsay Edward Durrant (N.Z.2379), RNZAF.
- Acting Wing Commander Ian George Esplin, DFC, (86713), RAFVR.
- Acting Wing Commander Herbert Eltherington (91210), AAF.
- Acting Wing Commander Donald Robert Russell Fair (76402), RAFVR.
- Acting Wing Commander Roger Salis Falk (74095), RAFVR.
- Acting Wing Commander Cuthhert Dumaresque Paul Franklin (31068).
- Acting Wing Commander Sidney Thomas Freeman, MBE, (02144), RAFVR.
- Acting Wing Commander Cyril Gardner (09255).
- Acting Wing Commander Wilfred Harold Garnett (80589), RAFVR.
- Acting Wing Commander George Edward Frederick Goode, DFC, (88447), RAFVR.
- Acting Wing Commander Sir Richard Bellingham Graham, Bt. (79463), RAFVR.
- Acting Wing Commander George Byng Grayling, MRCS, LRCP, (72117), RAFVR.
- Acting Wing Commander Charles Victor Guest (43491).
- Acting Wing Commander George Roy Gunn, MB, ChB, (73025), RAFVR.
- Acting Wing Commander Arthur Patrick Harrison (83188), RAFVR.
- Acting Wing Commander Walter Henry Herbert, MBE, (44490).
- Acting Wing Commander Keith Hitchins (82339), RAFVR.
- Acting Wing Commander Cyril Walter Holbourn, MBE, (43720).
- Acting Wing Commander James Ebenezer Horton, MBE, (35268).
- Acting Wing Commander Alan James (43203).
- Acting Wing Commander Fred Jepson (87131), RAFVR.
- Acting Wing Commander John Jewell (43392).
- Acting Wing Commander Edward James Smetham-Jones (73401), RAFVR.
- Acting Wing Commander Richard Watts-Jones (88093), RAFVR.
- Acting Wing Commander Samuel Henry Jordan, MBE, (44839).
- Acting Wing Commander George Thomas Kelsey (83121), RAFVR.
- Acting Wing Commander Frederick Kenneth Kennedy (75016), RAFVR.
- Acting Wing Commander Walter Lister Kerr (Aus.267642), RAAF.
- Acting Wing Commander Gerald Le Blount Kidd, MBE, (88335), RAFVR.
- Acting Wing Commander Harold Knox King (87132), RAFVR.
- Acting Wing Commander Eric Frank Kohler (09156), RAFVR.
- Acting Wing Commander Robert Armstrong Little (72142), RAFVR.
- Acting Wing Commander John Emrys Lloyd (91123), AAF.
- Acting Wing Commander William Charles Loader (43487).
- Acting Wing Commander William Francis McEgan (Aus.267456), RAAF.
- Acting Wing Commander Colin Foulds Maclaren (110523), RAFVR.
- Acting Wing Commander Ronald Turnbull Mark, MC, (78329), RAFVR.
- Acting Wing Commander Simon Napier Leslie Maude, DFC, (37865), RAFO.
- Acting Wing Commander Alfred Ernest Miller (43585).
- Acting Wing Commander Hedley John Morrish (80955), RAFVR.
- Acting Wing Commander Peter Claude Mortimore (87003), RAFVR.
- Acting Wing Commander Leslie Roy Mumby (31235).
- Acting Wing Commander Samuel Vivian Perry (44698).
- Acting Wing Commander Eric Plumtree, DFC, (83716), RAFVR.
- Acting Wing Commander Holroyd Armitage Boardman Porteous (33395).
- Acting Wing Commander Albert Midgley Robert Ramsden (44728).
- Acting Wing Commander William Noel Rayner (77951), RAFVR.
- Acting Wing Commander Kenneth Bodell Redmond, MB, BS, (23385), RAFO.
- Acting Wing Commander Wilfred Harry Reed (43449).
- Acting Wing Commander James Robert Smith Romanes, DFC, (39202), RAFO.
- Acting Wing Commander Norman Harold Sharpe (85350), RAFVR.
- Acting Wing Commander Ernest Keith Sinclair, DFC, (66546), RAFVR.
- Acting Wing Commander Francis Armitage-Smith (80700), RAFVR.
- Acting Wing Commander Stuart Hayne Granville-Smith (82845), RAFVR.
- Acting Wing Commander Barnett Saffron (109284), RAFVR.
- Acting Wing Commander Quentin Oliver Sansbury (90772), AAF.
- Acting Wing Commander Jasper Sidney Streater (84375), RAFVR.
- Acting Wing Commander Geoffrey Norman Street (31350), RAFO.
- Acting Wing Commander Francis Bertram Sumerling, BDS, (23097), RAFO.
- Acting Wing Commander James Douglas Sumner (76433), RAFVR.
- Acting Wing Commander Geoffrey Percy Sansom Thomas (31249), RAFO.
- Acting Wing Commander George William Joseph Thomas, MBE, (43394).
- Acting Wing Commander Thomas George Thomson (43790).
- Acting Wing Commander Charles Tompkins, AFM, (43497).
- Acting Wing Commander Walter Edward Tollworthy (77060), RAFVR.
- Acting Wing Commander Arthur Reginald Tooke, MBE, (75702), RAFVR.
- Acting Wing Commander Michael Angelo Toomey (119082), RAFVR.
- Acting Wing Commander Thomas Stuart Tull (70686), RAFVR.
- Acting Wing Commander Guy Austin Usher (90588), AAF.
- Acting Wing Commander Clifford Gordon Vandyk (74998), RAFVR.
- Acting Wing Commander Vivian Charles Varcoe (72961), RAFVR.
- Acting Wing Commander John Warre Bradney Vernon (37335).
- Acting Wing Commander Percy Arthur Walker (43777).
- Acting Wing Commander Dennis Stanley Wallen (77347), RAFVR.
- Acting Wing Commander Frank Maynard Northmor Watts (44491).
- Acting Wing Commander John Howard Weaver (78180), RAFVR.
- Acting Wing Commander John Milns West (77253). RAFVR.
- Acting Wing Commander Arthur Charles Philip Westhorpe (28010), RAFO.
- Acting Wing Commander Horace Clifton Westwood (44215).
- Acting Wing Commander Reginald George James White (31168).
- Acting Wing Commander Richard Wright Whittome, DFC, (72013), RAFVR.
- Acting Wing Commander Edward Frederick Wilde (43671).
- Acting Wing Commander Joseph Williams, MBE, (43651).
- Squadron Leader George Baillie (71696), RAFVR.
- Squadron Leader Donald Alexander Brewster (Can/C.9888), RCAF.
- Squadron Leader Alfred William Bridger (31118).
- Squadron Leader Herbert Walter Brock (43578).
- Squadron Leader Frederick Wilbore Collins (113796).
- Squadron Leader Sidney Thomas Cooper (40084), RAFO.
- Squadron Leader Harry Charles Cutter (43445).
- Squadron Leader Edward Dennis Deane, MM, (44443).
- Squadron Leader Herbert Charles Evans (44379).
- Squadron Leader Stuart Melbourne Green (Aus.262232), RAAF.
- Squadron Leader Trevlyn Lionel Grey (10099), RAFVR.
- Squadron Leader Leonard Duncan Albert Hussey (87314), RAFVR.
- Squadron Leader Donald Lewarne Ingram (110474), RAFVR.
- Squadron Leader Duncan Macdonnell Jannaway, MBE, (31279).
- Squadron Leader Raymond Wilfred Kerr (74149), RAFVR.
- Squadron Leader Charles James Lawrence (76487), RAFVR.
- Squadron Leader Bernard Williamson Little (90326), AAF.
- Squadron Leader Edmund Henry Sillince (44885).
- Squadron Leader Agnes Christian Gillan, MB, ChB, (861). Employed with RAF Medical Branch.
- Major James Matthew Poland (2031182V), SAAF.
- Major Abraham Jozef Van Lille (175303V), SAAF.
- Acting Squadron Leader Ronald Henry Adams (37459), RAFVR.
- Acting Squadron Leader John William Armstrong (107542), RAFVR.
- Acting Squadron Leader Walter Graham Arnold (89511), RAFVR.
- Acting Squadron Leader Maurice Campbell Badcock (79105), RAFVR.
- Acting Squadron Leader Ronald Scott Lawrence Bowker (65622), RAFVR.
- Acting Squadron Leader Cedric Braby (82132), RAFVR.
- Acting Squadron Leader Alfred Charles Bradbury (62541), RAFVR.
- Acting Squadron Leader Reginald William Brayne (83176), RAFVR.
- Acting Squadron Leader Victor Percy Brooks (77257), RAFVR.
- Acting Squadron Leader John George Browning (87854), RAFVR.
- Acting Squadron Leader Nigel Vivian Carter (31425), RAFO.
- Acting Squadron Leader Frederick Lister Chadwick (37778), RAFO.
- Acting Squadron Leader William Eric Chadwick (102154), RAFVR.
- Acting Squadron Leader John Sidney Chown (46593).
- Acting Squadron Leader Richard Kenneth Cooke (61608), RAFVR.
- Acting Squadron Leader Gerald Russell Cooper, DFC, AFC, (87072), RAFVR.
- Acting Squadron Leader William Young Craig (75360), RAFVR.
- Acting Squadron Leader Jack Townsend Crawshaw (82878), RAFVR.
- Acting Squadron Leader Edward John Cutler (43061).
- Acting Squadron Leader Meredith Owen Davis (48407).
- Acting Squadron Leader Andrew Spencer Dykes (107847), RAFVR.
- Acting Squadron Leader William Proudfoot Elliott (83541), RAFVR.
- Acting Squadron Leader John Frank Featonby (118730), RAFVR.
- Acting Squadron Leader Henry Robert Free (46232) Royal Air Force.
- Acting Squadron Leader Leslie Robert Freeman (Can/C.2660), RCAF.
- Acting Squadron Leader Haddon Goode (112916), RAFVR.
- Acting Squadron Leader John Goude (35309).
- Acting Squadron Leader Allen Wheatley Green, DFM, (122049), RAFVR.
- Acting Squadron Leader Jack Louis Grumbridge (89676), RAFVR.
- Acting Squadron Leader Norman Arthur Gwyther (46656).
- Acting Squadron Leader George Hampson (78031). RAFVR.
- Acting Squadron Leader Nigel Thornton Helme (86564), RAFVR.
- Acting Squadron Leader Arthur Chesley Holmes (Can/C.10443), RCAF.
- Acting Squadron Leader John Hobson Hooke, DFC, (Aus.401216), RAAF.
- Acting Squadron Leader William Leonard James (83676), RAFVR.
- Acting Squadron Leader Alexander Murray Jamieson (80501), RAFVR.
- Acting Squadron Leader Basil Belmore Joseph (62478), RAFVR.
- Acting Squadron Leader John Edward Hardy (82299), RAFVR.
- Acting Squadron Leader Ronald John Keir (87503), RAFVR.
- Acting Squadron Leader Vernon Percy Key (84929), RAFVR.
- Acting Squadron Leader Gordon Leitch (44038).
- Acting Squadron Leader Ernest William Bellew Lewis (79334), RAFVR.
- Acting Squadron Leader Alfred Richard Frederick Martin (101743), RAFVR.
- Acting Squadron Leader William Harold Marwood (68325), RAFVR.
- Acting Squadron Leader Eric Thomas McCabe (44586).
- Acting Squadron Leader Frank Desmond MacCarthy (87988), RAFVR.
- Acting Squadron Leader Henry Treston Macauley (84258), RAFVR.
- Acting Squadron Leader David McFarlane (44386).
- Acting Squadron Leader Hayden Hugh James Miller, DFC, AFC, (N.Z.1996), RNZAF.
- Acting Squadron Leader Gordon Douglas Mills (44506).
- Acting Squadron Leader Edmund Frank Ockenden (45772).
- Acting Squadron Leader John Robert Oliver (46246).
- Acting Squadron Leader William John Osborne (Can/C.7962), RCAF.
- Acting Squadron Leader Alastair Murray Paterson, MBE, (45922).
- Acting Squadron Leader Stanley Payne (45175).
- Acting Squadron Leader Robert John Robinson (45704).
- Acting Squadron Leader Archibald Arthur Roissetter (46279).
- Acting Squadron Leader Harold Frederick Ruston (70595), RAFO.
- Acting Squadron Leader Ernest Henry Sharp (83185), RAFVR.
- Acting Squadron Leader Henry Alexander Shewan (77555), RAFVR.
- Acting Squadron Leader Raymond Davies Sheardown (46161), RAFVR.
- Acting Squadron Leader John Richard Sherborne (81835), RAFVR.
- Acting Squadron Leader Noel Benjamin Sherwell (83017), RAFVR.
- Acting Squadron Leader M. M. Shrinagesh (Ind.1665), Royal Indian Air Force.
- Acting Squadron Leader Bernard Babington Smith (87840), RAFVR.
- Acting Squadron Leader Alfred Stephenson (87269), RAFVR.
- Acting Squadron Leader William Lennie Stevenson (119317), RAFVR.
- Acting Squadron Leader James Michael Dalrymple Symons (77169), RAFVR.
- Acting Squadron Leader Harry Tee (65487), RAFVR.
- Acting Squadron Leader David Vivian Hussey Thomas (45201).
- Acting Squadron Leader Stanley Anthony Thomson (76072), RAFVR.
- Acting Squadron Leader Charles Robert Topham (73437), RAFVR.
- Acting Squadron Leader James Dewar Urquhart (113008), RAFVR.
- Acting Squadron Leader Albert Fritz Ward (45472).
- Acting Squadron Leader Robert Dustan Watson (67272), RAFVR.
- Acting Squadron Leader Irenham Desmond Weatherhead (61545), RAFVR.
- Acting Squadron Leader George Henry Wiles (43458).
- Acting Squadron Leader Richard Sydney Fitzroy Williams (44033).
- Acting Squadron Leader Alfred Cedric Woolf (61181), RAFVR.
- Acting Squadron Leader Charles Lewis Yelland (100787), RAFVR.
- The Rev. Charles Gerard McKenzie (106663), RAFVR.
- The Rev. John Wilfred Nowers (109138), RAFVR.
- Acting Group Officer Beryl Constance Beecroft (133), WAAF.
- Wing Officer Elizabeth Constance Bather (163), WAAF.
- Wing Officer Clara Milnes Spafford (113), WAAF.
- Acting Wing Officer Nancy Marion Salmon (49), WAAF.
- Squadron Officer Katherine Irene Connal (19), WAAF.
- Squadron Officer Jeanne Margaret Goldsborough (107), WAAF.
- Squadron Officer Nesta Mary Childes Holland (703), WAAF.
- Acting Squadron Officer Beatrice Romaine Leighton (2314), WAAF.

Civil Division

- James Adair, Senior Vice-Chairman, National Council of Young Men's Christian Associations for Scotland.
- Margaret Finlayson Adams, Headmistress, Croydon High School for Girls.
- Professor Saul Adler, MB, ChB, MRCP, Head of Department of Parasitology, Hadassah University, Palestine. For services to the Forces.
- Charlton Stanford Agate, Joint General Manager in charge of Design and Development, Gramophone Company Ltd.
- Conel Hugh O'Donel Alexander, employed in a Department of the Foreign Office.
- Captain Alexander Allan, Master, SS Basil, Booth Steamship Company Ltd.
- Leonard Gordon Allen, lately Telephone Manager, Nottingham, General Post Office.
- Professor Roy George Douglas Allen, D.Sc, lately Head of United Kingdom Statistical Division of the Combined Production and Resources Board.
- William Charles Allen, Clerk to the Hornchurch Urban District Council. For services to Civil Defence.
- Lieutenant-Colonel Ian Forest Anderson, MC, Chairman, Council of Voluntary War Workers' Committee in North-West Europe.
- Captain Magnus Anderson, Master, MS Baltavia, United Baltic Corporation.
- Kathleen Maria Margaret Archer, MBE, employed in a Department of the Foreign Office.
- Walter James Thomas Archer, Director of Printing and Binding, His Majesty's Stationery Office.
- Bertram Penrhyn Arrowsmith, Superintendent Engineer, Port Line Ltd.
- Major Arthur Lindley Ashwell, DSO, TD, DL, Secretary, Territorial Army and Air Force Association of the County of Nottingham.
- Geraldine Maitland Aves, Senior Welfare Officer, Ministry of Health.
- Joan, Lady Babington, for services to the Royal Air Force Comforts Committee.
- Edwin Backhouse, MBE, Deputy Director of Contracts, Air Ministry.
- Harry Richard Backhouse, Managing Director, Mellor Bromley & Company Ltd.
- Arthur Bailey, ARIBA, Chief Inspector of Building Labour Supply, Ministry of Labour and National Service.
- Richard John Baker, PhD, lately Principal, Ministry of Economic Warfare.
- Rowland Baker, Superintendent of Landing Craft, Admiralty.
- Charles Thomas Barlow, lately Chairman, Emergency Committee, and Vice-Chairman, Air Raid Precautions Committee, Oldbury.
- Arthur Thomas Barnard, AMInstCE, Principal Director, Small Arms Ammunition, Ministry of Supply.
- Cyril Maunder Barnes, Surveyor, East Barnet Council and lately Air Raid Precautions Controller.
- Philip Stuart Milner-Barry, employed in a Department of the Foreign Office.
- Ronald Gilbert Baskett, MSc, ARIC, head of Chemical and Animal Nutrition Division and Senior Research Officer, Ministry of Agriculture, Northern Ireland.
- Alfred Basterfield, Town Clerk and lately Air Raid Precautions Sub-Controller, Halesowen.
- Alderman Joseph Bates, for services to Civil Defence, Nuneaton.
- Major Herbert James Baxter, Civil Assistant, War Office.
- John Philip Baxter, PhD, AMIChemE, Consultant on Atom Bomb Research, Department of Scientific and Industrial Research.
- Mona Josephine Tempest, Baroness Beaumont (Baroness Howard of Glossop), Honorary Commandant, British Red Cross Society Military Auxiliary Annexe, York Military Hospital, Goole.
- John Beecher, Divisional Officer, Education Officer's Department, London County Council. For services to Civil Defence.
- Captain Edward Bell, Superintendent Stevedore, A. Holt & Company, Liverpool.
- Thomas Bellis, Chief Engineer Officer, SS Samdak, Moss Hutchison Line.
- Rowland Bennett, MBE, ASAA, Chairman, Colwyn Bay Savings Committee.
- Horace James Bentham, Administrative Officer, Colonial Office.
- John Bentley, FSI, Senior Housing Inspector, Ministry of Health.
- Hugh Charles Bergel, lately Commander and Officer Commanding No. 9 Ferry Pool, Air Transport Auxiliary.
- Claud Bicknell, lately Fire Staff Officer, Grade I, National Fire Service Headquarters.
- Lieutenant-Colonel John Eaton Blackwall, DSO, TD, lately Air Raid Precautions Controller, Leicestershire.
- Paul Blundell, Chairman, Bradford Savings Committee.
- William Boddington, Principal, Air Ministry.
- Sir Ian Frederick Cheney Bolton, Bt., Senior Intelligence Officer, Office of the District Commissioner, Glasgow.
- Percy Reginald Bolus, MB, MRCS, LRCP, Director of Medical Services, Ministry of Pensions.
- Wilfred Leonard Boon, MIME, Member, Fuel Efficiency Committee.
- Robert Booth, Town Clerk and lately Air Raid Precautions Sub-Controller, Gillingham.
- Colonel William Booth, Command Welfare Officer, Eastern Command.
- Peter Siemens Botter, Chief Representative of the United Kingdom Commercial Corporation in America.
- Frederick Joseph Boucher, Chairman, War Emergency Committee, Irish Union of Young Men's Christian Associations.
- Samuel Bower, Superintendent, Vickers Armstrongs Ltd.
- Robert Bowman, MBE, Fire Force Commander, Western (No. 2) Area, Scotland.
- Joseph Bradley, AMInstCE, Senior Scientific Officer, National Physical Laboratories, Department of Scientific and Industrial Research.
- John Naul Brailsford, Chief Establishment Officer, Postal and Telegraph Censorship Department.
- Alderman Bernard Dutton Briant, lately Chairman, Emergency Committee, Brighton.
- Penelope Joan McKerrow Bright, Principal, Offices of the Cabinet and Minister of Defence.
- George Richard Brockman, Chief Executive Officer, Petroleum Warfare Department.
- Captain William Broome, Master, SS Samyork, Andrew Weir & Company.
- Group Captain Cecil Leonard Morley Brown, Education Officer, Royal Air Force Volunteer Reserve.
- Harry Albert Brown, Chief Test Pilot, A. V. Roe & Company Ltd.
- John Laird McKenzie Brown, MRCS, LRCP, Medical Officer for Civil Defence, Metropolitan Essex.
- John Sidney Vesey Brown, Assistant Secretary, Ministry of Fuel and Power.
- Captain Matthew McKirdie Brown, Master, SS Norwegian, Donaldson Line Ltd.
- Charles Phipps Brutton, lately County Air Raid Precautions Controller, Dorset.
- Captain Harold Bryan, Master, SS Samdel, Ellerman's Wilson Line Ltd.
- John Robert Buckley, lately Chairman, Emergency Committee, Oldham.
- Victor William Buckwell, Chief Engineer Officer, Highland Brigade, Royal Mail Lines Ltd.
- Edward Bernard Bull, Managing Director, Welwyn Electrical Laboratories, Ltd.
- Group Captain Roger Burges, Head of Royal Air Force Casualty Branch, Air Ministry.
- Alderman John Burgoyne, JP, lately Chairman, Emergency Committee, Luton.
- John George Burnett, County Army Welfare Officer for Aberdeenshire and Kincardineshire.
- George Frew Fox Caldwell, JP, Chairman, Dundee Food Control Committee.
- John Caldwell, Chief Staff Officer and Accountant, Ministry of War Transport.
- Thomas Knox Caldwell, County War Agricultural Executive Officer, Ministry of Agriculture, Northern Ireland.
- Reginald Riviere Calkin, General Secretary, Toc H Incorporated.
- Hilda Margaret Pickard-Cambridge, MBE, Chief Searcher, Surrey, Joint War Organisation of the British Red Cross Society and Order of St. John.
- Donald Phillips Cameron, MBE. For services to the Ministry of Aircraft Production.
- Captain Arthur Camp, Master, SS Geddington Court, Court Line Ltd.
- Wilfrid Samuel Hamilton Campbell, MB, ChB, DPH, County Medical Officer, Lincolnshire (Lindsey) County Council. For services to Civil Defence.
- Walter Frederick Rex Campling, Deputy Director (Radio Components), Directorate of Communications Components Production.
- Edward Harry Canby, First Class Pilot, Bristol Pilotage Authority.
- Herbert Spencer Carter, JP, Chairman, Poole Education Committee.
- John Harwood Catleugh, MBE, JP, lately Air Raid Precautions Controller, King's Lynn.
- William Henry Chadwick, Managing Director, Chadwick & Shapcott Ltd.
- Harry Chambers, ISO, MBE, lately Principal, Ministry of Agriculture and Fisheries.
- Wilfrid Rendel Myson Chambers, JP, lately Member, Middlesex Civil Defence Committee.
- Frank Ewart Chandler, MC, Secretary for Education, City of Worcester. For services to Civil Defence.
- Roland Henry Chaplin, Assistant Chief Designer, Hawker Aircraft Ltd.
- John Chaston, Town Clerk and Chief Billeting Officer, Kettering Borough.
- Edward Thomas Chater, Clerk of the Council and lately Air Raid Precautions Controller, Sidcup.
- The Honourable Katharine Mary Medina Chatfield, Regional Administrator, Northern Civil Defence Region, Women's Voluntary Services. For services to Civil Defence.
- Leonard Childs, lately County Air Raid Precautions Controller, Isle of Ely.
- Captain Frederick John Edwin China, FRIC, Member, Fuel Mixtures Committee. For services to the Petroleum Warfare Department.
- Derman Guy Christopherson, MSc, DPhil, Senior Scientific Adviser, Research and Experiments Department, Home Office.
- Margaret Beritha Alice Churchard, Principal, Ministry of War Transport.
- Robert Stoddart Cochrane, Chief Engineer Officer, SS City of Hong Kong, City Line Ltd.
- Robert Cockburn, MSc, PhD, Superintendent, Telecommunications Research Establishment, Ministry of Aircraft Production.
- Captain Malcolm Elliott Cogle, Master, MV Pacific Enterprise, Furness Withy & Company Ltd.
- Oswald John Buxton Cole, Chief Constable of Leicester.
- Henry William Coleman, Fire Force Commander, No. 24 (Birmingham) Fire Force, National Fire Service.
- Henry Louis Collard, Chief Executive, Port of London Lighterage Emergency Executive.
- Major Christopher Collaro, Managing Director, Collaro Ltd.
- Douglas Henry Collins, MD, Medical Superintendent, Whardcliffe Emergency Hospital.
- Malcolm Collinson, lately Deputy Air Raid Precautions Controller, Grimsby.
- David Ritchie Cook, Chief Engineer Officer, SS Lapland, Currie Line Ltd.
- Gerald Victor Cook, Officer Commanding, No. 7 Ferry Pool, Air Transport Auxiliary.
- Roland Antony Cookson, Vice-Chairman, Joint Industrial Committee for the Savings Movement in Northumberland and Durham.
- Frederick Bayes Copeman, Shelter Manager, Deep Tube Shelters, London.
- Herbert Copland, Deputy Clerk to the Lincolnshire (Lindsey) County Council and lately Deputy Air Raid Precautions Controller.
- Richard Cottam, Regional Officer, National Council of Social Service, South West Counties. For services to Civil Defence.
- Mary Aylwin Cotton, MB, BS, Principal, Foreign Office, recently employed in the Ministry of Economic Warfare.
- Frank Ernest Cowlin, Assistant Director, Ministry of Aircraft Production.
- Frederic Robert Cox, Attached for special duties, Home Office.
- Veronica Mary Machell Cox, MBE, County Secretary for West Kent, Women's Land Army.
- William Pepper Cross, Director of Industrial Salvage, Northampton. For services to Civil Defence.
- Captain Joseph Edward Cullen, Master, SS Devonshire, Bibby Line.
- Lieutenant-Colonel Malcolm Edward Durant Cumming, Civil Assistant, War Office.
- Professor William Murdoch Cumming, DSc, MIChemE, FRSE, Senior Gas Adviser, Scottish Civil Defence Region.
- Leslie Bennet Craigie Cunningham, PhD, FRSE, Superintendent, Air Warfare Analysis Section, Ministry of Aircraft Production.
- Captain David Georgeson Cuthbertson, Master, SS Benlawers, Ben Line Steamers Ltd.
- Major Richard Dane, MC, DL, lately Chairman, County Civil Defence Committee, Herefordshire.
- Douglas Archibald Daniels, Town Clerk, Deal. For services to Civil Defence.
- John Young Davidson, Chief Engineer Officer, SS Bailey Foster, Currie Line Ltd.
- William George Davie, JP, House Coal Officer, London Region.
- Alan Hudson-Davies, Assistant Regional Controller, Ministry of Labour and National Service.
- Edward Roy Davies, Director of Research, Kodak Ltd.
- Colonel Lionel Ormandy Davies, Civil Assistant, War Office.
- Alfred Davis, Director and General Manager, John G. Kincaid and Company, Ltd.
- Charles Augustus Davis, lately Managing Director, C. T. Brock & Company, Crystal Palace Fireworks Ltd.
- Councillor Frederick Henry Derbage, lately Chairman, Air Raid Precautions Committee, Great Yarmouth.
- Lieutenant Commander Paul Leonardo de Laszlo, Royal Navy Volunteer Reserve, employed in a Department of the Foreign Office.
- Denis Sefton Delmer, Controller of a Division, Foreign Office.
- Thomas Denness, MIMechE, AMIEE, Superintendent, Royal Small Arms Factory, Enfield Lock, Ministry of Supply.
- Ursula Madge Dods, Member of Trade Boards.
- Joseph William Dolphin, lately Chief Representative of the United Kingdom Commercial Corporation, Western Mediterranean Theatre.
- Councillor Robert Elliot Douglas, TD, JP, DL, Chairman, Edinburgh Local Savings Committee.
- Richard John Drumm, Accountant and Acting Secretary, British Museum (Natural History).
- Commander Josceline Heneage Drummond, DSC, Royal Navy (Retd.), Assistant Secretary, Incorporated Soldiers' Sailors' and Airmen's Help Society.
- James Duff, JP, Member, Ulster Savings Committee.
- James Catt Duffus, MC, Air Raid Precautions Controller, Aberdeen.
- Lieutenant-Colonel David John Dunbar, JP, Secretary, Territorial Army Association of the County of Dunbarton.
- Major Francis Durkin, AMInstCE, Borough Engineer, West Hartlepool. For services to Civil Defence.
- Charles Sumner Durst, Principal Technical Officer, Meteorological Office, Air Ministry.
- Bernard Frank Dyke, FSI, Chief Surveyor, Admiralty.
- Robert Douglas Easton, Ministry of War Transport Representative, Seine Area.
- John Frederick Eccles, lately Assistant Principal Priority Officer, War Office.
- Hubert McDonald Edelsten, Entomologist, Ministry of Agriculture and Fisheries.
- Eric John Horatio Edenborough, Senior Clerk, House of Commons.
- Captain Charles Eastwood Edge, Master, SS Samos, Elder Dempster Lines, Ltd.
- Colonel Francis Joseph Edlmann, DSO, DL, Army Welfare Officer for Metropolitan Kent.
- Edward Henry Edwardes, AMIEE, Managing Director, Lancashire United Transport & Power Company Ltd.
- Captain Alfred Harold Edwards, Registrar of the District Probate Registries at Bangor, Chester and St. Asaph.
- Gerald Tudor Edwards, Branch Manager, Mediterranean, Cable & Wireless Ltd.
- Lewis John Edwards, MP, General Secretary, Post Office Engineering Union.
- Frederick George Egner, Town Clerk and formerly Chief Co-ordination Officer for Civil Defence, Tynemouth.
- Grace Mary Eland, Principal, Westminster National Training College of Domestic Subjects.
- James William Eldridge, Assistant Regional Controller, Ministry of Labour and National Service.
- Joseph Henry Ellis, Chief Engineer Officer, MV Idomeneus, Alfred Holt & Company.
- Arthur Stephenson Ellison, lately Chief Administrative Officer, Office of the Public Trustee.
- Ernest Lambert Elsdon, Secretary, International Federation of Bunkering Depot Proprietors.
- Harry Victor Emery, lately Chairman, Air Raid Precautions Committee, Brownhills, Staffordshire.
- Richard Franklin Entwistle, Works Manager, Blackburn Respirator Factory. For services to Civil Defence.
- Evangeline Evans, Assistant Secretary, Board of Trade.
- Charlotte Anne Falwasser, District Superintendent, Duke of Connaught's District, St. John Ambulance Brigade.
- Douglas Hunter Findlay, Executive Officer, Leicestershire War Agricultural Executive Committee.
- James Finlay, Senior Engineer, Ministry of Finance, Northern Ireland.
- Captain Ernest Walter Firmin, Submarine Superintendent, Engineer-in-Chief's Office, General Post Office.
- Harold Firth, MInstCE, Divisional Engineer, London County Council. For services to Civil Defence.
- John Rupert Firth, Professor of General Linguistics, School of Oriental and African Studies, University of London.
- Reginald Harry Fish, Headmaster, The Boys Farm Home Approved School, Godstone, Surrey.
- Maurice Harrington Fitzgerald, MC, Assistant Secretary, Royal Hospital, Chelsea.
- Captain Daniel Wright Fowle, Master, SS Ocean Vulcan, Idwel Williams & Company.
- Edward Alexander Fowler, Principal, Ministry of Fuel and Power.
- Charles Richard Fox, Chief Constable and lately Air Raid Precautions Controller, Oxford.
- Captain Reginald Guy Thomas Franklin, Master, MV Athelprince, Athel Line Ltd.
- George Daniel Frazer, Principal, Ministry of War Transport.
- Lieutenant-Colonel Bernard Russell French, DSO, Welfare Officer and Controller, Metropolitan Police Food Service.
- James Frederick French, ISO, MBE, lately Acting Librarian, Foreign Office.
- Otto Robert Frisch, PhD, Principal Scientific Officer, Directorate of Atom Bomb Research, Department of Scientific and Industrial Research.
- Commander Thomas George Lamb Gale, Officer Commanding, Advanced Flying Training School, Air Transport Auxiliary.
- Antonia Marian Gamwell, Commandant and Officer Commanding the First Aid Nursing Yeomanry.
- Captain John Stewart Gardner, Master, SS Empire Vauxhall, E. T. Lindley.
- Howard George Garrett, Chairman, Freight Committee, South American Meat Importers.
- Mabel Louisa Marion Gay, Matron, St. Mary's Hospital, Portsmouth. For services to Civil Defence.
- Harold Henry Gibbons, JP, lately Chairman of Emergency Committee, Deputy Invasion Defence Officer and Chief Civil Defence Warden, Greenwich.
- Harry Elias Gibbs, Regional Manager, London (South-Eastern) Area, War Damage Commission.
- James Finlay Elder Gilchrist, Executive Head, Trading Department, United Kingdom Commercial Corporation.
- Adam Eric Gilfillan, Town Clerk and Air Raid Precautions Controller, Barnsley.
- Laurence Duval Gilliam, Director of Features, British Broadcasting Corporation.
- The Honourable Esme Consuelo Helen Glyn, Regional Administrator, North Midland Civil Defence Region, Women's Voluntary Services. For services to Civil Defence.
- Victor Martin Reeves Goodman, MC, Clerk, House of Lords.
- Cecil Gordon, PhD, MSc, FRSE, Principal Scientific Officer, Air Ministry.
- Lawrence Martin Gough, Senior Technical Officer, Air Ministry.
- Captain William Henry Gould, Master, SS Monkleigh, W. J. Tatem Ltd.
- Walter Thomas Gould, JP. For services to the Welfare of Seamen.
- Alfred William Grafton, General Secretary, Motor Agents' Association Ltd.
- Alexander Graham, JP, Member, East Perthshire Agricultural Executive Committee.
- Kenneth William Grant, General Inspector, Ministry of Health.
- Maria Isabella Grassie, MBE, Assistant Controller, Post Office Savings Department, General Post Office.
- Alderman Alfred John Gray, lately Chairman, Borough Air Raid Precautions Committee, Swindon.
- Dorothea Helen Forbes Gray, lately Assistant Secretary, Ministry of Production.
- Monica Helen Anstruther Gray, District Administrator, Eastern Scotland, Women's Voluntary Services. For services to Civil Defence.
- Thomas Gray, Chief Engineer Officer, SS Madras City, Sir William Reardon Smith & Sons Ltd.
- Arnold Trevor Green, Director, British Refractories Research Association.
- Alan Frederic Greenwood, Town Clerk, and lately Divisional Air Raid Precautions Controller, Leamington Spa.
- Alexander Millar Meek Grierson, MD, ChB, DPH, FRSE, Senior Assistant Medical Officer, Manchester. For services to Civil Defence.
- Clarence Edward Alfred Griffin, Works Manager, S. Smith & Sons (England) Ltd.
- George Griffith, Director of Regional Organisation (Production and Capacity), Ministry of Aircraft Production.
- George Griffith, Public Relations Officer, Home Office.
- Lieutenant-General Francis Home Griffiths, JP, DL, Royal Marines (Retd.), lately Mayor of Winchester.
- Harry Willoughby Grove, Traffic Manager, Cable & Wireless Ltd.
- Harold Gordon Gunn, Principal, Ministry of Fuel and Power.
- Henry Frank Gurney, His Majesty's Trade Commissioner, Grade II, at Melbourne, Australia.
- Alfred Haigh, Managing Director, Brittains Ltd., Cheddleton Paper Mills.
- Walter Henry Haile, MInstCE, Engineer of the Trent Catchment Board.
- Commander Marcus Samuel Hale, Officer Commanding, No. 1 Ferry Pool, Air Transport Auxiliary.
- Herbert Oswald Hambleton, Controller of Silk and Rayon, Ministry of Supply.
- Alderman Peter Strong Hancock, for public services in Gateshead.
- Arthur Lonsdale Handley, Group Surveyor, Group No. 5, London County Council Heavy Rescue Service.
- Tom Hands, Manager, British Thomson-Houston Company (Willesden Works).
- Captain Reginald Arthur Hanson, Master, MV Cowrie, Anglo-Saxon Petroleum Company Ltd.
- Observer Captain William Gordon Hanson, Royal Observer Corps.
- Edwin Harle, lately Director of Communications Components Production, Radio Production Executive.
- Charles Albert Walter Harmer, Director, Pye Radio Ltd.
- Kenneth Gordon Harper, Senior Administrative Assistant, South-Western Civil Defence Regional Headquarters.
- Geoffrey Bond Harrison, PhD, Director of Research, Ilford Ltd.
- Thomas Shotton Hart, Chief Engineer Officer, SS City of Canberra, Ellerman & Bucknall Steam Ship Company Ltd.
- James Barrie Hastie, Divisional Road Haulage Officer for Scotland, Ministry of War Transport.
- Professor Kenneth Alan Hayes, MIME, Assistant Professor, Military College of Science.
- Captain Eric Standley Heffer, Civil Assistant, War Office.
- Lieutenant-Colonel Ellis John Heilbron, lately Chairman, County Air Raid Precautions Committee, Kent.
- Alexander George Hellman, Director, London County Council Ambulance Service. For services to Civil Defence.
- Robert Brown Henderson, Principal Collector of Taxes, Board of Inland Revenue.
- Wilfrid Quixano Henriques, MIMechE, MINA, Director Clarke Chapman & Company Ltd.
- Benjamin Henry, Chief Cinematograph Officer, Entertainments National Service Association.
- Francis John Heritage, MBE, Private Secretary to First Parliamentary Counsel.
- Isobel Margaret Herriot, County Director, Fife Branch, Joint War Organisation of the British Red Cross Society and Order of St. John.
- Arthur Wynne Hersee, Secretary to the Lord Mayor's National Air Raid Distress Fund.
- Alderman Arthur Hewitt, JP, lately Chairman, Caernarvonshire Air Raid Precautions Emergency Committee.
- Theophilus Ronald Hewitt, General Secretary, National Federation of Merchant Tailors.
- Captain Frank Norman Hibbert, Master, SS Harpalycus, J. & C. Harrison, Ltd.
- Captain Clifford Higgins, MIEE, Joint Manager, General Electrical Company (Shaw) Factory.
- Ian Cameron Miller Hill, lately Deputy Director-General of Materials Production, Ministry of Aircraft Production.
- Daniel Hillman, lately Chief Organiser, Fisheries Section, Transport and General Workers' Union.
- John Leslie Hilton, MIMechE, Chief Engineer, Hoffman Manufacturing Company Ltd.
- Charles Leslie Hinings, FRAeS, Superintendent, Royal Air Force AeroEngine School, Rolls-Royce Ltd.
- Captain Ralph Arthur John Aylesbury Hodgson, Master, SS Malancha, Thos. & Jno. Brocklebank Ltd.
- Commander (S) Edward Rolf Frederick Hok, Royal Navy, employed in a Department of the Foreign Office.
- Ernest John Holland, Assistant Director of Army Contracts, War Office.
- Commander (S) Ralph Cooper Hollingworth, Royal Navy Volunteer Reserve, Civil Assistant, Admiralty.
- Captain Frank Robert Holman, Master, SS Benedict, Booth Steamship Company Ltd.
- Andrew Douglas Hopkinson, Deputy Surveyor, Dean Forest, Forestry Commission.
- Leslie George Housden, MD, Chairman, Mothercraft Training Sub-Committee, National Association of Maternity and Child Welfare Centres.
- Richard Arthur Warren Hughes, Deputy Principal Priority Officer, Admiralty.
- William Hughes, Chief Engineer Officer, SS Calumet, Elder Dempster Lines Ltd.
- Frederick George Humphrey, Regional Information Officer, Ministry of Information.
- Lieutenant-Colonel Leslie Alexander Longmore Humphreys, Civil Assistant, War Office.
- Elizabeth Anne Hunt, Administrative and Welfare Officer, Women's Transport Service (First Aid Nursing Yeomanry).
- William Hunter, Chief Billeting Officer, Sheffield.
- Charles Thornburn Hutchinson, lately Chairman, Emergency Committee, York.
- Lockhart Whiteford Hutson, MM, FRIBA, Director of Building Materials, Ministry of Works.
- Colwell Iddon, MBE, Principal, India Office.
- Frank Inch, House Governor and Secretary, Norfolk and Norwich Hospital and Secretary of the Jenny Lind Hospital for Children, Norwich. For services to Civil Defence.
- Arthur George Ingham, AMInstCE, FSI, Chief Engineer and Surveyor, Department of Agriculture for Scotland.
- Mary Elizabeth Calderwood Inglis, County Secretary, Lanarkshire Branch, Joint War Organisation of the British Red Cross Society and Order of St. John.
- Leonard St. Clair Ingrams, employed in a Department of the Foreign Office.
- Captain Thomas William Inman, Master, MV Empire Elaine, Cayzer, Irvine & Company Ltd.
- Captain Harold Goodwin Innes, Royal Navy (Retd.), District Inspector of Lifeboats, Royal National Lifeboat Institution.
- John Ironmonger, Managing Director, Fellows Morton & Clayton Ltd.
- Ernest Gaines Jackson, Chief Engineer Officer, MV Opalia, Anglo-Saxon Petroleum Company Ltd.
- Gildart Edgar Pemberton Jackson, ARIBA, employed in a Department of the Foreign Office.
- Joseph Frank Jackson, Principal Scientific Officer, Directorate of Atom Bomb Research, Department of Scientific and Industrial Research.
- William Gordon Reed Jacob, Engineer-in-Chief, Cable and Wireless Ltd.
- William George Jagelman, Principal, Home Office.
- Captain Norman Jameson, Master, SS Empire Stuart, F. C. Strick & Company.
- John Jeffrey, MD, FRCS (Ed.), Hospital Officer, Aberdeen, Department of Health for Scotland.
- William Sharp Jeffrey, Chief Engineer Officer, SS Samdauntless, Wm. Thomson & Company.
- James Edmund Earl Jenkin, Manager, Engineering Department, Anglo-American Oil Company Ltd.
- Maurice Kearley Jephson, Superintending Executive Officer, India Office.
- Frederick Charles Jex, lately Vice-Chairman, Aid Raid Precautions Committee, Norwich.
- Lieutenant-Colonel William Harold John, County Army Welfare Officer for Monmouthshire.
- Daniel Johns, MSc, lately Air Raid Precautions Controller, County of Carmarthen.
- Coningsby Samuel Johnson, MC, lately Town Clerk and Air Raid Precautions Controller, Reading.
- Ramsey Gelling Johnson, High Bailiff and Vicar-General of the Isle of Man.
- The Honourable Laura Pearl Lawson Johnston, Regional Administrator, Eastern Civil Defence Region, Women's Voluntary Services. For services to Civil Defence.
- Lieutenant-Colonel Robert Henry Johnston, Army Welfare Officer, East Central District.
- James Johnstone, MB, ChB, DPH, Medical Superintendent, Hairmyres Hospital, Lanarkshire. For services to Civil Defence.
- Frank Hubert Jones, JP, lately Chairman, War Emergency Committee and Invasion Committee, Smethwick.
- Harold Jones, Chief Engineer Officer, SS Empire Trumpet, Larrinaga Steamship Company Ltd.
- Henry Jones, MBE, Principal, Ministry of Civil Aviation.
- Robert John Jones, Land Commissioner, Ministry of Agriculture and Fisheries.
- Edward Mallett Jope, Principal, Assistance Board.
- Christopher Frank Kearton, Scientific Consultant on Atom Bomb Research, Department of Scientific and Industrial Research.
- Councillor William Keenan, JP, MP, lately Chairman, Emergency Committee, Bootle.
- Captain Bernard Kelly, Master, TS Antenor, A. Holt & Company.
- Alfred Ernest Kennedy, Secretary, Liverpool Victoria Approved Society.
- Percy Edward Kennedy, FSI, District Valuer, Board of Inland Revenue.
- Stanley Henry Gladstone Kent, FSI, Technical Adviser, London (South-Western) Area, War Damage Commission.
- Hilda Mary Kentish, MBE, JP, County Director, Buckinghamshire, British Red Cross Society.
- John William Kenzie, Principal, Admiralty.
- John Edgar Keyston, DPhil, Acting Assistant Director, Scientific Research and Experiment Department, Admiralty.
- John Harry Percy Wheeler-Kither, Superintendent, Royal Air Force Aero-engine School, Bristol Aeroplane Company Ltd.
- Major Alexander Campbell White Knox, MC, MB, BCh, Assistant Commissioner, No. 1 District, St. John Ambulance Brigade.
- Alderman James Philip Durnford Lacey, JP, lately Chairman, War Emergency Committee, Portsmouth.
- Samuel Lamplugh, HM Inspector, Ministry of Education.
- Gerald William Large, MBE, Director of Establishment and Accounts, National Savings Committee.
- William Barker Simpson Lawson, Chief Engineer Officer, SS Rajahstan, Common Bros. Ltd.
- Lieutenant-Colonel Julian David Layton, lately Home Office Representative in the Commonwealth, of Australia.
- Margaret Grace Leech, Chairman, Women's Committee, Church Army.
- Stuyvesant Henry Le Roy-Lewis, Chief Officer (Information and Records Branch), Postal and Telegraph Censorship Department.
- John George Lindsay, FRSE, FEIS, Rector, Dunfermline High School.
- Senior-Commander Marjorie Ellis, Lady Lindsell, Administrative Welfare Officer, Auxiliary Territorial Service.
- Frederick Baron Lister, Managing Director, J. Weinberg & Sons (1937) Ltd.
- Owen John Tompsett Llewellyn, Finance Control Officer, Entertainments National Service Association.
- Francis Ira Lloyd, Principal, Ministry of Works.
- Robert Owen Lloyd, MBE, lately Officer-in-Charge, Civil Defence Rescue Service, Birkenhead.
- Thomas Richard Sillifant Lloyd, lately Deputy County Air Raid Precautions Controller, Cornwall.
- John Morris Loughran, Deputy Regional Officer, Scotland, Assistance Board.
- Alfred Cyril Lovesey, AFRAeS, Development Engineer, Rolls-Royce Ltd.
- Percy George Meighar-Lovett, Deputy Chief Telecommunications Censor, Postal and Telegraph Censorship Department.
- David Nicoll Lowe, Principal, recently employed in the Ministry of Production.
- Commander Stanley Thomas Lowe, Officer Commanding, Air Movements Flight, Air Transport Auxiliary.
- Frank Laurence Lucas, employed in a Department of the Foreign Office.
- Albert James Ludlam, Director, William Rhodes Ltd.
- Lionel Murray Macbride, Public Relations Officer, Office of the High Commissioner for the United Kingdom in the Commonwealth of Australia.
- James McCaig, Principal, Ministry of Civil Aviation.
- William John McCaughin, Chief Engineer Officer, Lanarkshire, Cayzer Irvine & Company Ltd.
- Ian Hyslop McClure, MB, ChB, FRCS (Ed.), Consultant Surgeon, County of Orkney. For services to Civil Defence.
- Archibald John MacClymont, Head Clerk, Supreme Court of Judicature.
- Josiah Macey, MBE, Superintending Electrical Engineer, Dockyard Department, Admiralty.
- Captain Alistair Talbert McGlashan, Master, SS Samspeed, Lyle Shipping Company Ltd.
- Major Jackson McGown, MC, Member, Ulster Savings Executive Committee.
- Robert McGuffog, Assistant Controller, Post Office Stores Department, General Post Office.
- Commander James McGuinness, Officer Commanding, No. 4 Ferry Pool, Air Transport Auxiliary.
- Captain Thomas John Murray Mackenzie, Chief Marine Superintendent, Thos. & Jno. Brocklebank, Ltd.
- Duncan Robert Mackintosh, General Manager, Shell Group of Oil Companies operating in the Middle East.
- Wylie McKissock, MB, MS, FRCS, Surgeon-in-Charge, Neurosurgical Centre, Atkinson Morley Emergency Hospital, Wimbledon.
- Captain Hugh McLachlan, Master, SS Delilian, Donaldson Line Ltd.
- John McLeod, Chief Representative of the United Kingdom Commercial Corporation in Turkey.
- Archibald Robert Octavius McMillan, Acting Director of Training, British Overseas Airways Corporation.
- Sydney James McVicar, MBE, lately Air Raid Precautions Controller, West Riding of Yorkshire.
- George Cunliffe McVittie, PhD, FRSE, employed in a Department of the Foreign Office.
- Philip Nicholas Seton Mansergh, DPhil, Director, Empire Division, Ministry of Information.
- Jeremiah Leask Manson, Staff Inspector, Ministry of Education.
- Herbert Stanley Marchant, employed in a Department of the Foreign Office.
- Albert Edward Marsden, Chief Inspector, British Air Commission, Washington, Ministry of Aircraft Production.
- Albert Edward Louis Mash, lately Director of Public Relations, Ministry of Aircraft Production.
- Andrew Mason, Divisional Inspector, Ministry of National Insurance.
- Captain William Francis Mason, Master, SS Dinard, Southern Railway Company.
- George Victor Mathieson, Chief Drainage Engineer, Ministry of Agriculture and Fisheries.
- Archibald James Matthew, Secretary to the Missions to Seamen.
- Captain Alfred James Meek, Master, SS Novelist, T. & J. Harrison.
- Stanley Mehew, AMInstCE, County Surveyor and lately Head of Civil Defence Rescue Service, Derbyshire.
- Norman James Mellentin, Chief Engineer Officer, MS Hoperidge, Hopemount Shipping Company Ltd.
- Albert Meredith, Chief Engineer Officer, SS Jonathan Holt, John Holt & Company (Liverpool) Ltd.
- William Horace Henry Middleton, JP, for public services in Norfolk.
- Charles Watt Miles, Chief Representative of the United Kingdom Commercial Corporation in India.
- Alexander Inglis Millar, Deputy Controller, National Health and Pensions Division, Scotland, Ministry of National Insurance.
- Captain James Jewels Miller, Master, MV Empire Reynolds, H. E. Moss & Company.
- Councillor Henry Job George Millichip, JP, lately Chairman, Air Raid Precautions Committee, Willenhall.
- Victor Thomas Millington, Chief Engineer Officer, SS Empire Milner, British Tanker Company Ltd.
- Ernest Minors, AMInstCE, lately Head of Civil Defence Rescue Service, Darlington.
- Charles John Minter, City Engineer and lately Head of Civil Defence Rescue Service, York.
- Baddeley Oswald Mitchell, Chief Engineer Officer, SS Umtata, Bullard, King & Company Ltd.
- James Alexander Montgomery, Chief Engineer Officer, SS Blairdevon, Nisbet Shipping Company.
- Sidney Herbert Moon, Chairman, Surrey War Agricultural Executive Committee.
- Joseph Augustine Mooney, lately Deputy Air Raid Precautions Controller, Cardiff.
- Charles Garrett Ponsonby, Viscount Moore, Assistant Secretary, Board of Trade, recently employed in the Ministry of Production.
- Captain John Allen Moore, Master, SS Ariguani, Elders & Fyffes Ltd.
- Robert Alexander Moore, Regional Production Director, Ministry of Fuel and Power.
- Ernest Edmund Morgan, MC, FRIBA, Borough Architect, Swansea Corporation. For services to Civil Defence.
- James Morton, Chief Engineer Officer, ex-SS Amarapoora, P. Henderson & Company.
- Ernest Hemer Mossman, Chief Engineer Officer, SS Empire Life, T. & J. Harrison.
- Andrew James Moyes, Accountant, House of Commons.
- William Bell Muir, MBE, Fire Force Commander, National Fire Service, South Eastern Area, Scotland.
- Matthew Mullen, Chief Engineer Officer, SS Empire Miranda, J. & J. Denholm Ltd.
- Alderman Wilfred Earl Mullen, Mayor and lately Deputy Air Raid Precautions Controller, Holborn.
- Albert Henry Mumford, MIEE, Staff Engineer, Engineer-in-Chief's Office, General Post Office.
- Andrew Hunter Arbuthnot Murray, JP, Staff Officer, Grade II, Edinburgh, National Fire Service.
- William Henry Nankivell, Chief Textile Technologist, Courtaulds, Ltd.
- Edwin Marrat Neave, Town Clerk and lately Air Raid Precautions Controller, Wimbledon.
- Norman James Neville, Director of the Food Machinery Industrial and Export Group.
- Joseph William New, Vice-Chairman, Westminster Savings Committee.
- Doris Newhouse, Chairman, National Committee for Young Women's Christian Association War Service.
- Captain Alexander Niblock, Master, SS Torr Head, Ulster Steamship Company Ltd.
- Charles Nicol, Manager and Secretary, Fleetwood Fishing Vessel Owners' Association, Ltd.
- Henry John Nightingale, MS, FRCS, JP, Senior Surgeon, Royal South Hants and Southampton Hospital, Emergency Medical Service.
- Harold Edmund Nott, Superintending Inspector, Board of Customs and Excise.
- Percy Nunn, Divisional Traffic Superintendent, London (East), Southern Railway Company.
- Frederick William Nunneley, lately Assistant Regional Controller, Ministry of Labour and National Service.
- Edward Charles Oakley, MC, Comptroller of Accounts, United Kingdom Commercial Corporation.
- Ernest Thomas Osborne, Chief Chemical Inspector, Ministry of Supply.
- Alfred George Beech Owen, JP, Chairman, South-Staffordshire Industrial Savings Committee.
- John Robertson Owen, lately Member, Joint Air Raid Precautions Committee and Emergency Committee, Torbay.
- Captain William Pace, Master, SS Llandovery Castle, Union Castle Mail Steamship Company Ltd.
- Richard James Page, Representative in North America of the Navy, Army and Air Force Institutes.
- Harold Palmer, MBE, Principal, Colonial Office.
- Gerard Ivan Hugh Parkes, MBE, Assistant Regional Controller, Ministry of Labour and National Service.
- John Maxey Parrish, Director, Publications Division, Ministry of Information.
- Walter Francis Pascoe, Secretary, Tanker Tonnage Committee, Petroleum Board.
- Lieutenant-Colonel Alfred Douglas Pass, JP, DL, County Army Welfare Officer for Dorset.
- Major Francis William Joseph Paterson, MC, Honorary County Secretary, Gloucestershire, Soldiers', Sailors', and Airmen's Families Association.
- John Paul, Chief Engineer Officer, SS Caxton, Anchor Line Ltd.
- Muriel Amy Payne, Director and Principal of St. Christopher's Nursery Training College, Tunbridge Wells. For services to Civil Defence.
- Resy Sophie Teresa Peake, Commandant, Mechanised Transport Corps.
- George Charles Pearson, MInstCE, Engineer-in-Chief, Birmingham Corporation Gas Department.
- Professor Robert Peers, MC, lately Assistant Regional Controller, Ministry of Labour and National Service.
- Thomas Edgar Pegg, MBE, Manager, Naval Canteen Service, Navy, Army and Air Force Institutes.
- William George Penney, DSc, Principal Scientific Officer, Directorate of Atom Bomb Research, Department of Scientific and Industrial Research.
- Harold James Penrose, FRAeS, Chief Test Pilot, Westland Aircraft Ltd.
- Michael Willcox Perrin, Assistant to the Director of Atom Bomb Research, Department of Scientific and Industrial Research.
- David Bertie Peters, Chief Engineer Officer, MV Edward F. Johnson, Oriental Trade and Transport Company Ltd.
- William Herbert Peters, Assistant General Manager, Telephone and Radio Works. Coventry, General Electric Company, Ltd.
- Harold Adrian Russell Philby, employed in a Department of the Foreign Office.
- James Randall Philip, KC, Voluntary Staff Officer, Regional Commissioner's Office, Edinburgh.
- William Powell Phillips, MRCS, LRCP, DPH, Deputy Medical Officer of Health, Cardiff. For services to Civil Defence.
- Sir Alfred Donald Pickford, VD, Headquarters Commissioner for Publicity, Boy Scouts Association.
- The Honourable Dorothy Frances Pickford, JP, Honorary Secretary, Civil Relief Overseas Department, Joint War Organisation of the British Red Cross Society and Order of St. John.
- Ernest Pickles, Chief Engineer Officer, SS Duke of Argyll, London Midland & Scottish Railway Company.
- Charley Pickstone, Executive Director, British Cotton & Wool Dyers Association.
- Commander Arthur Derek Pickup, Officer Commanding No. 5 (Training) Ferry Pool, Air Transport Auxiliary.
- Alfred Pickworth, DSc, Principal Surveyor (Sunderland) Lloyd's Register of Shipping.
- Lieutenant-Colonel Algernon Swain Pilcher, Assistant Command Welfare Officer, Western Command.
- Arthur William Pilgrim, FCIS, County Director, City of London Branch, British Red Cross Society.
- James Henry Pilling, Fire Force Commander, No. 6 (Hull) Fire Force, National Fire Service.
- Charles Frank Sidney Plumbley, Director of Publications, His Majesty's Stationery Office.
- Sibbald Wheatley Thompson Pollock, Chief Engineer Officer, SS Redgate, Turnbull Scott Shipping Company Ltd.
- Thomas Poole, LRCP, LRCS (Ed.), LRFPS, lately Medical Officer in Charge, Military Prison and Detention Barracks, Riddrie, Glasgow.
- Gunnar Poppe, Works Manager, Sunbeam Talbot Company Ltd.
- Stanley Street-Porter, Chairman, National Farmers' Union Poultry Committee.
- T/Lieutenant-Colonel Richard Holliday Pott, employed in a Department of the Foreign Office.
- Claud Forbes Powell, Principal of the Surrey County School of Music.
- Ernest Douglas Powell, Chief Engineer Officer, SS Gaelic Star, Blue Star Line Ltd.
- Major Edward George Hugh Power, lately Deputy County Air Raid Precautions Controller and Air Raid Precautions Officer, Norfolk.
- Ronald Lindsay Prain, Controller of Diamond Dies and Tools, Ministry of Supply.
- Frank Pratt, Director, Ministry of Pensions.
- Captain, Andrew Preece, Master, MV British Wisdom, British Tanker Company Ltd.
- Herbert Spencer Price, Chief Constable, Bradford. For services to Civil Defence.
- Nelson Morris Price, MBE, JP, Chairman, North East Glamorgan War Pensions Committee.
- Captain Owen Stanley Price, Master, SS Stanrealm, Stanhope Steamship Company Ltd.
- Joseph Beaumont Prior, Ministry of Aircraft Production Resident Technical Officer, Vickers-Armstrongs, Ltd.
- Sydney Clifford Pritchard, MD, ChB, Medical Officer in Charge, Hornsey, Central Hospital, Emergency Medical Service.
- Samuel Procter, lately Town Clerk, and Air Raid Precautions Controller, Huddersfield.
- Captain Donald Leslie Pugsley, Master, MV Comanchee, Anglo-American Oil Company Ltd.
- Ernest Pugson, Principal Assistant for Carriages and Wagons to Chief Mechanical Engineer, London, Midland and Scottish Railway Co.
- Roy Bingley Pullin, Managing Director, R. B. Pullin & Company.
- Captain Charles George Purton, Master, MV Debrett, Lamport and Holt.
- Charlotte Clare, Lady Railing, Head of the Industrial Welfare and Housing Department, Women's Voluntary Services. For services to Civil Defence.
- Stephen Nelson Ralph, Deputy Town Clerk, and lately Deputy Air Raid Precautions Controller, Canterbury.
- John Ferguson Ramsay, Jute Trade Adviser to the Board of Trade.
- Terence George Randall, Assistant Clerk to the London County Council. For services to Civil Defence.
- John Ashworth Ratcliffe, Superintendent, Telecommunications Research Establishment, Ministry of Aircraft Production.
- Richard Cyril Ray, Town Clerk and lately Air Raid Precautions Controller, Shoreditch.
- William Henry Ray, Chief Engineer Officer, SS Malancha, Thos. & Jno. Brocklebank, Ltd.
- Lieutenant-Colonel Haydn Oliver Reed, Command Land Agent and Valuer, Eastern Command, War Office.
- Major Frederick Arthur Rees, Shipping and Tanker Representative, Swansea, Ministry of War Transport.
- Lieutenant-Colonel George Turner Tatham Rheam, Civil Assistant, War Office.
- John Whinfrey Ridgeway, Manager of Radio Division, Edison Swan Electric Company.
- Archibald Kuril Ripgwell, AMINA, Joint Proprietor, William Badger (London).
- Leonard Roap, Deputy Director of Stores, Admiralty.
- Denys Kilham Roberts, General Secretary, Society of Authors, Playwrights and Composers.
- Observer Captain Angus Robertson, MBE, MC, TD, Royal Observer Corps.
- Duncan Irvine-Robertson, MC, JP, Secretary, Stirling and Clackmannan Agricultural Executive Committee.
- Captain Frederick Robinson, Master, SS Garesfield, Wm. Dickinson & Company Ltd.
- Francis George Robinson, Chairman, Nottingham and District Court of Referees and Hardship Committee.
- Captain Frederick William Robinson, Master, SS Rangitiki, New Zealand Shipping Company Ltd.
- John Henry Robson, Director-in-Charge, Propeller and Engine Repair Auxiliary, British Overseas Airways Corporation.
- Frederick Henry Rolt, MBE, Principal Scientific Officer, National Physical Laboratories, Department of Scientific and Industrial Research.
- May Isabella Rose, Regional Woman Fire Officer, National Fire Service Headquarters.
- Norah Katherine Ross, Regional Administrator for Scotland, Women's Voluntary Services. For services to Civil Defence.
- Margaret Elizabeth Rotherham, JP, Honorary County Secretary, Warwickshire, Soldiers', Sailors', and Airmen's Families Association.
- Charles Roy, MBE, Chief Constable, Kilmarnock Burgh Police.
- Councillor Gordon Russell, Chairman, Air Raid Welfare Committee and lately Chairman, Emergency Committee, Hull.
- William John Russell, JP, lately Air Raid Precautions Sub-Controller, Romford Area.
- Lieutenant-Commander Geoffrey Kirkland Rylands, JP, Royal Navy (Retd.), General Works Manager, Rylands Brothers Ltd.
- Mary Critchley-Salmonson, Organiser of Catholic Women's League, Huts and Canteens in North-West Europe.
- Dane Wilding Salter, MBE, Deputy Director of Victualling, East Indies, Admiralty.
- Reginald Josiah Sarjant, DSc, Member, Fuel Efficiency Committee.
- Lieutenant-Colonel Hugh Norman Saunders, Civil Assistant, War Office.
- Una Mary Saunders, Vice-President, Churches Committee for Women Serving with HM Forces.
- Jack Henry Schulman, ScD, PhD, Assistant Director of Research, Department of Colloid Science, University of Cambridge.
- Alderman Joseph Leopold Schultz, lately Deputy Chairman, Air Raid Precautions Committee, Hull.
- George Walter Scott, lately a Director, British Raw Materials Mission, Washington.
- William Scott, Assistant Controller of Jute, Ministry of Supply.
- William Scott, JP, Managing Director, Jarrow Metal Industries, Ltd.
- Stephen John Scurlock, MC, MD, MS, FRCS, MRCP, Medical Superintendent, Ministry of Pensions.
- Alan Hetherington Shakeshaft, formerly Commandant, Civil Defence Staff College, Stoke D'Abernon.
- Flying Officer Ronald Thomas Shepherd, RAFO, Chief Test Pilot, Rolls-Royce Ltd.
- Lieutenant-Colonel Leslie Frederick Sheridan, Civil Assistant, War Office.
- Captain Charles Ely Rose Sherrington, MC, Secretary, Railway Research Service.
- William Cecil Shields, MBE, Superintending Armament Supply Officer, Royal Naval Armament Depot, Priddy's Hard.
- Frederick Lester Sidebotham, MC, Secretary, Shipwrecked Mariners' Society.
- Herbert Walter Sidwell, General Manager, Air Service Training Ltd.
- William Downs Simmonds, lately Air Raid Precautions Controller, Poole.
- Joseph Simpson, Chief Constable, Northumberland. For services to Civil Defence
- Kenneth Cameron Sinclair, AMIEE, lately Deputy Co-ordinator of Radio Production, Radio Production Executive.
- Alan Frank Skinner, lately Deputy Air Raid Precautions Controller, Nottinghamshire.
- Lieutenant-Commander Nicholas Frederick Smiles, DSC, Royal Navy (Retd). Lately District Air Raid Precautions Controller, Wallsend, Northumberland.
- Ian Scott Smillie, MB, FRCS (Ed.), FRFPS, Orthopaedic Surgeon, Scottish Emergency Medical Service.
- Albert Hugh Smith, PhD, DLitt, Principal Scientific Officer, Air Ministry.
- Bryce McCall Smith, MB, ChB, Medical Superintendent, Victoria Infirmary, Glasgow. For services to Civil Defence.
- Captain Charles Somerville Smith, Master, MS Eastern Prince, Prince Line Ltd.
- Harold Alfred Smith, Principal, War Office.
- Lady Helen Smith, Regional Administrator, Southern Region, Women's Voluntary Services. For services to Civil Defence.
- Herbert Edward Smith, Principal, War Office.
- Professor John George Smith, Member, Midlands Tribunal for the registration of Conscientious Objectors.
- John Murdoch Smith, Chief Engineer Officer, SS Tekoa, New Zealand Shipping Company.
- Wallace Smith, General Manager, Estates Department, Birmingham Corporation. For services to Civil Defence.
- William Horace Smith, Managing Director, W. H. Smith & Company (Electrical Engineers) Ltd.
- William Robert Smith, Principal Clerk, Supplies Department, London County Council. For services to Civil Defence.
- Howard Virtue Snook, Chief Engineer, Bomber Command, Royal Air Force.
- William Arthur Colen Snook, Acting Chief Engineer (Buses and Coaches), London Passenger Transport Board.
- Harold Ernest Snow, Secretary, Petroleum Board.
- William Oliver Snowden, lately Chairman, Emergency Committee, Peterborough.
- Alfred Geoffrey Southern, MC, lately Director of Narrow Fabrics, Ministry of Supply.
- Percy Archibald Sporing, MSc, General Manager, Telegraph Condenser Company.
- Walter Harland Staniforth, Assistant Accountant General, India Office.
- Colonel Granville Brian Chetwynd-Stapylton, TD, JP, DL, lately Command Welfare Officer, South-Eastern Command, now Welfare Liaison Officer, Southern Counties, Eastern Command.
- Anthony Bedford Steel, lately Regional representative for London, East Anglia and the Home Counties, British Council.
- Colonel Robert William George Stephens, General Staff, War Office.
- Theodore Alfred Stephens, Deputy Chairman, Agriculture Fund, British Red Cross Society.
- Andrew King Stevenson, Chief Transport Officer, Scottish Branch, British Red Cross Society.
- George Bertie Stigant, MSc, Superintending Cartographer and Assistant Superintendent of Charts, Admiralty.
- Walter Stanley Stiles, DSc, Senior Scientific Officer, National Physical Laboratories, Department of Scientific and Industrial Research.
- Thomas Stobbs, Chief Engineer Officer, SS Samoresby, South American Saint Line Ltd.
- Geoffrey Singleton Strode, MM, Circulation and Production Director, Publications Department, British Broadcasting Corporation.
- Alexander Marshall Struthers, Secretary, Scottish Council of Social Service. For services to Civil Defence.
- Sir Eric Studd, Bt., Assistant Fire Force Commander, No. 12 (South-Eastern) Regional Fire Headquarters, National Fire Service.
- Victor Thomas Sulston, Regional Secretary (London Region), National Federation of Building Trades operatives.
- Joseph Summers, Chief Test Pilot, Vickers Armstrongs Ltd.
- John William Sutton, Engineer to the Dover Harbour Board.
- Captain Leonard Herbert Swan, Master, MV Port Jackson, Port Line Ltd.
- Thomas Edwin Pryce-Tannatt, MB, BS, DPH, Inspector of Salmon and Fresh Water Fisheries, Ministry of Agriculture and Fisheries.
- Donald Marshall Taylor, Fire Force Commander, No. 15 (Reading) Fire Force, National Fire Service.
- Joseph John Taylor, lately Principal, Ministry of Labour and National Service.
- Walter Frederick Taylor, Director, Telegraph Condenser Company, Ltd.
- Peter Thomas, Chief Engineer Officer, MV Port Pirie, Port Line Ltd.
- Tom Roberts Thomas, Secretary, Air Registration Board.
- Lieutenant-Colonel Arthur Percevale Thorne, Command Land Agent, Southern Command, War Office.
- The Honourable Phyllis Margaret Thorold, Vice-President, City and County of London Branch, British Red Cross Society.
- John Dun Tod, JP, DL, Air Raid Precautions Controller, County of Midlothian.
- Geoffrey Sydney Todd, MB, ChM, FRCP, Medical Superintendent, King Edward VII Sanatorium. For services to Civil Defence.
- David Netherclift Truscott, ScD, PhD, Deputy Director (Radio Valves), Directorate of Communications Components Production.
- Captain Albert Victor Parkinson Turnbull, Master, SS Fort Massac, John Cory & Sons, Ltd.
- James Turnbull, Assistant to the Chief Surveyor (London), British Corporation Register of Shipping and Aircraft.
- Ronald Bruce Turnbull, Civil Assistant, War Office.
- Beatrice Ethel Turner, MB, BS, FRCS (Ed.), FRCOG, Consultant Obstetrician, Shardeloes Emergency Maternity Hospital, Bucks.
- Major Vincent Turner, MInstCE, Borough and Waterworks Engineer and formerly Deputy Controller for Civil Defence, Rotherham.
- Wing-Commander Lynden Charles Wynne-Tyson, Royal Air Force (Retd.), Deputy General Manager, Home Canteen Service, Navy, Army and Air Force Institutes.
- Herbert John Vick, County Commissioner, Devon, Joint War Organisation of the British Red Cross Society and Order of St. John.
- Nancy Lycett, Baroness Vivian, MBE, County Organiser, Cornwall, Women's Voluntary Services. For services to Civil Defence.
- John Charles Wade, Joint Manager, General Electrical Company (Shaw) Factory.
- Captain Norman Guinness Wale, Assistant Chief Constable, War Department Constabulary.
- John Walker, Accountant, Blackburn Respirator Factory. For services to Civil Defence.
- William Charles Walker, Chairman, Advisory Committee, Southern Region, Works and Buildings Emergency Organisation.
- Walter William Wallis, Central National Registration Officer, General Register Office, Ministry of Health.
- Spencer Augustus Selwyn Walton, Chief Engineer, Great Yarmouth Waterworks Company. For services to Civil Defence.
- Arthur Robson Wannop, Director of County Work, North of Scotland College of Agriculture.
- Lieutenant-Colonel Frank Saunders Warren, MC, Officer in Charge, Entertainments National Service Association, BAOR.
- Winston Victor Waste, MBE, Chief Licensing Officer, Ministry of Works.
- Arthur Francis Watts, lately Director of Footwear. Repairs, Board of Trade.
- Robert Jaffray Waugh, Procurator Fiscal, West Fife and Kinross.
- James Harker Wears, Works Manager, English Electric Company, Ltd.
- Montagu Egerton Weatherall, Honorary Director, Channel Islands Refugees Committee.
- Thomas Henry Webb, Chief Engineer Officer, SS Empire Waimana, Shaw Savill & Albion Company Ltd.
- Frank Edward Webber, Chairman, Cardiff Savings Committee.
- Charles Ewart Webley, Director of Packing, Ministry of Food.
- George Gordon Wood Webster, DSc, Principal Surveyor for Scotland, Lloyd's Register of Shipping.
- Joseph Weekes, FRIBA, County Architect and Housing Director, Dunbarton.
- Arthur Frederick Wells, Senior Civilian Officer, Inter-Service Topographical Department.
- Lady Anastasia (Zia) Michaelovna Wernher, County President, Leicestershire, St. John Ambulance Brigade.
- Arthur Charles West, Chief Constable, and formerly Chief Civil Defence Warden, Portsmouth.
- Horace Frederick West, Head Postmaster, Bristol, General Post Office.
- John Reginald Harvey Whiston, Assistant Professor of Chemistry and Metallurgy, Military College of Science, War Office.
- Alfred Whitaker, MIEE, Chief Engineer (Physicist), Nash & Thompson.
- Margaret Whitaker, Honorary County Secretary, South Oxfordshire, Soldiers', Sailors' and Airmen's Families Association.
- George Frederick White, Chief Engineer Officer, SS Greathope, Newbigin Steam Shipping Company Ltd.
- Maurice Evan White, Chief Accountant, Board of Trade.
- Commander Thomas Henry Neville Whitehurst, Officer Commanding, No. 6 Ferry Pool, Air Transport Auxiliary.
- John Theodore Whitley, MB, ChB, Assistant Commissioner, Essex, St. John Ambulance Brigade.
- Reginald Thomas Whitton, Chairman, Agricultural Committee, Estate Agents and Auctioneers' Institute.
- Major Charles Warwick Whitworth, MBE, TD, Army Welfare Officer, Northern Command.
- Charles Victor Wicks, Director, British Sugar Corporation Ltd.
- William Ellis Wiggins, Chief Engineer Officer, MV Taroona, Union Steamship Company of New Zealand Ltd.
- James Hugh Wilkinson, Chief Billeting Officer and Clerk to Cirencester Urban District Council.
- Vera Berdoe-Wilkinson, Commandant, Joint War Organisation of the British Red Cross Society and Order of St. John.
- Observer Captain William Robinson Wilkinson, Royal Observer Corps.
- Captain Alfred Guy Williams, Master, MV Empire Macandrew, Hain Steamship Company Ltd.
- Cecil Williams, Assistant Accountant General, Board of Customs and Excise.
- Guy Williams, lately Chairman, Emergency Committee, Birkenhead.
- William George Williams, Trinity House Pilot, Corporation of Trinity House.
- Harold Alfred Willis, Chief Billeting Officer and Emergency Feeding Officer, Huddersfield County Borough.
- David Wilson, Chief Engineer Officer, ex-SS Yorkwood, Joseph Constantine Steamship Line Ltd.
- James Gavin Wilson, First Senior Second Engineer Officer, SS Queen Elizabeth, Cunard White Star Ltd.
- John Humphrey Witney, MBE, Secretary, British Museum.
- Herbert John Wood, Chief Engineer Officer, SS Marquesa, Houlder Brothers Ltd.
- Captain Robert Hilton Woodrow, Master, SS Silversandal, S. & J. Thompson Ltd.
- Captain Thomas Charles Woods, Master, SS Lady of Mann, Isle of Man Steam Packet Company Ltd.
- Joan Alice Elizabeth Woollcombe, Director, Civil Defence Workers Health Department, Joint War Organisation of the British Red Cross Society and Order of St. John.
- James Alexander Wright, Director of Accounts, His Majesty's Stationery Office.
- Alderman Frederick Ross Wyld, JP, lately Civil Defence Controller and Honorary Air Raid Precautions Officer, Walthamstow.
- Nora Wynne, MBE, Headquarters Labour Management Officer, Ministry of Supply.
- Commander Samuel Bert Yardley, Officer Commanding, No. 16 Ferry Pool, Air Transport Auxiliary.
- Henry Bertram Yates, Chairman, Birmingham Savings Committee.
- Raymond de Courcy Baldwin, MBE, British Vice Consul at Beirut.
- Hugh Warner Bedford, British subject resident in the Sudan.
- Major Cyril Sackville Jocelyn Berkeley, Assistant Political Adviser at Muntafiq.
- Leonard William Berry, British subject resident in Ecuador.
- Ernest James Bisiker, British Consul at Cleveland.
- Irene Boyle, MBE, Personal Secretary to His Majesty's Ambassador, Washington.
- Thomas Edward Brown, British subject resident in Egypt.
- Temporary Lieutenant-Colonel Robert Francis Gore-Browne, attached to a Department of the Foreign Office for service abroad.
- William Harris Burland, Ministry of War Transport Representative in Roumania.
- William Gibson Carmichael, British subject resident in Egypt.
- Philip Harwood Clarke, British subject resident in Chile.
- Cyril Spenceley Cleverly, British subject resident in Persia.
- Charles Sidney Collinson. Attached to a Department of the Foreign Office, for service abroad.
- Reginald Thomas Davidson, MBE, Acting British Consul at Kansas City.
- Maurice Donald Mackintosh Falconer, British Vice-Consul at Villa Real.
- Frank Chester Foulsham, British subject resident in the Argentine Republic.
- Colonel Henry Norman Fryer, Military Attaché at His Majesty's Legation at Berne.
- Lilian Goligher, British subject resident at Tangier.
- Michael Grant, British Council Representative in Turkey.
- Ralph Gunner Henderson, Temporary Civil Secretary at His Majesty's Embassy at Buenos Aires.
- Derek Rowson Hobson, Director of Middle East Supply Centre in Persia.
- David Graham Hutton, British Information Services, United States of America.
- Norman King, British subject resident in Venezuela.
- Howard McElderry, British subject resident in Greece.
- Florence Brereton Maw, British subject resident in Yugoslavia.
- Alexander Miller, British subject resident in Egypt.
- Harold Musker, MC, British subject resident in Persia.
- Miralai John Frederick Noble Bey, Assistant Commandant of Police, Port Said.
- John Arthur Reed Pepper, attached to a Department of the Foreign Office, for service abroad.
- Wilfrid Herbert Peters, British subject resident in Iraq.
- Major Randolph Madattie Powell, DSO, British subject resident in the Argentine Republic.
- John Pownall Reeves, His Majesty's Consul at Macao.
- Colonel William Frederick Rhodes, Military Attaché at His Majesty's Embassy at Rio de Janeiro.
- Margaret Russell St. Aubyn, British subject resident in the United States of America.
- Joanna Saunders, British subject resident in Greece.
- Leonard Arthur Scopes, His Majesty's Consul at Ljubljana.
- Nigel Oliver Willoughby Steward, His Majesty's Consul at Montevideo.
- Riversdale Garland Stone, Press Attaché at His Majesty's Embassy at Rio de Janeiro.
- Henry Havergal Redfern Thompson, British subject resident in Colombia.
- Alan Arthur Lancelot Tuson, His Majesty's Minister and Consul at Port-au-Prince.
- Mary Huntiey Walker, British subject resident in France.
- Major Arthur Adolf Whittall, Passport Control Officer at His Majesty's Embassy at Angora.
- Margaret Williams, British subject resident in France.
- Colonel William Addison, MC, DCM, Director of Recruiting and Rehabilitation, and Controller of Manpower, Southern Rhodesia.
- Major Thomas Hugh William Beadle, a Barrister of Bulawayo, Southern Rhodesia. For public services.
- Major George Symington Cameron, MC, Director of the Cotton Research and Industry Board, Southern Rhodesia.
- Alexander Gilmour Campbell, a member of the Coburg City Council, and a Commissioner for the Melbourne and Metropolitan Board of Works, State of Victoria, for many years.
- Lewis Rowsell Cooper. For services to Civil Defence, Newfoundland.
- Roy Alfred Cripps, JP, Secretary to the Lord Mayor of Hobart, and honorary Treasurer of the Allies Appeal Committee, State of Tasmania.
- Douglas Henry Dare, a trader of Kolonyama, Leribe District, Basutoland. For philanthropic services during the War.
- James Francis Dowling, Secretary of the South Australian Branch, Returned Sailors, Soldiers and Airmen's Imperial League of Australia.
- Major Colin Robert Duncan, Private Secretary to the Governor of the State of South Australia.
- Maggie Elsworth, MBE, Vice-President and Chairman of the Women's National Service League, Southern Rhodesia.
- Claude Charles Douglas Ferris, Clerk of the Legislative Assembly, Southern Rhodesia.
- Freda Gibson, MB, BS, of Ceduna, State of South Australia. For services as a flying doctor on Eyre Peninsula.
- Robert Francis Halsted, Director, Department of Supply, Southern Rhodesia.
- Alfred Hines. For services in connection with charitable and patriotic movements in Fremantle, State of Western Australia.
- Charles Keeling Homer, Master of the SS Corner Brook, of Newfoundland.
- George Cooper Kekwick, Manager of the State Engineering Works, State of Western Australia.
- Ernest William Lacy, Secretary of the Hobart Sub-Branch, Returned Soldiers' League, State of Tasmania.
- Charles Victor Lowe, MM, Superintendent of the Native Recruiting Corporation in Basutoland.
- William Forbes Mackenzie, District Commissioner, Bechuanaland Protectorate.
- Edgar Frank Marshall. For public and philanthropic work in the State of South Australia.
- Gilbert Sherman McDonald, Superintendent of Technical Schools, State of South Australia. For services in connection with the technical training of men for the Armed Forces and war industries.
- Alexander John Morison, Town Clerk of Adelaide, State of South Australia.
- John Lawrence Murphy, Assistant Trade Commissioner for Newfoundland in London.
- John William Phillip, Director of Production, Southern Rhodesia.
- Calvert Coates Pratt, President of the Newfoundland Industrial Development Board.
- Evelyn Irene Richardson, Matron, Austin Hospital, State of Victoria.
- Charles Ridge, General Works Manager in Southern Rhodesia, and a Commissioner of the Rhodesian Iron and Steel Commission.
- Cecil Leonard Robertson, AMInstCE, Secretary, Department of Agriculture and Lands, Southern Rhodesia.
- The Reverend John Henry Sexton, President of the Aborigines Friends Association, State of South Australia.
- Lieutenant-Colonel George Dorricutt Shaw, VD, Commissioner of Civil Defence, and Controller of Salvage, State of South Australia.
- William Henry Sydney Sheppard, Chairman of the South Australian Division of the Australian Red Cross Society.
- Kenneth Churchill Skuce, Secretary of the Civil Defence Organisation, Newfoundland.
- Annie Lee Smail, Founder and Organiser of the King George and Queen Elizabeth Club, Dundee, under the auspices of the Empire Societies' War Hospitality Committee.
- Ernest Hubert Stephens, Chairman, and a Trustee of the Basutoland War Fund.
- Lady Rachel Stuart. For services in connection with the work of the Empire Societies' War Hospitality Club at Salisbury and other places in this country.
- James Howard Taylor, lately Town Clerk and Treasurer of the Patriotic Committee, Brighton, State of Victoria.
- Lawrence Ford Wacher, MBE, Principal Agricultural Officer, Basutoland.
- Frederick Hilton Wallace, MS, MB. For public and municipal services in Geelong, State of Victoria.
- Nancy Vera Brown, for social and nursing services, Madras.
- Robina Margaret Gertrude Brown, lately Regional Commissioner, Indian Red Cross Society, N.E. India, Bengal.
- Joyce Edwina Turrille, Lady Collins, lately Organising Secretary, Provincial WVS, Bombay.
- Muhammad Wahaj-ud-Din Abbasi, Indian Civil Service, Secretary to Government, Information and Rural Development Departments, United Provinces.
- Honorary Lieutenant Maulavi Abul Lais Saaduddin Muhammad, MBE, Royal Indian Navy, Director of Public Instruction, Assam.
- Lewis Percy Addison, Indian Civil Service, Deputy Commissioner, Lahore, Punjab.
- Ghulam Hussain Kadirdadkhan Agha, Officiating Collector of Dadu, Sind.
- Aziz Ahmed, Indian Civil Service, Joint Secretary, Commerce, Labour and Industries Department, Bengal.
- Charles Barns, Director of News and External Services, All-India Radio.
- Vernon Thomas Bayley, MBE, Indian Police, Superintendent of Police, Criminal Investigation Department, Punjab.
- Frank Owen Bell, Indian Civil Service, District Magistrate, Decca, Bengal.
- Vaman Prabhakar Bhandarkar, Deputy Chief Transportation Manager, Bengal & Assam Railway, Calcutta.
- Raj Bahadur Debendra Mohan Bhattacharjya, Chairman, Midnapore District Board, Bengal.
- Lieutenant-Colonel Cuthbert Alfred Bozman, MB, ChB, DPH, Indian Medical Service, Officiating Public Health Commissioner with the Government of India.
- Henry George Carpenter, Regional Controller of Railway Priorities, Madras.
- Clifford William Casse, Waterworks and Mechanical Engineer, Public Health Department, United Provinces.
- Niranjan Prasad Chakravarti, PhD, Deputy Director-General of Archaeology in India.
- Rai Bahadur Shiv Charan Das, Collector of Central Excise, Allahabad.
- Rustomjee Hormasjee Dastur, Plant Physiologist, Cotton Physiological Research Scheme, Indian Central Cotton Committee, Institute of Plant Industry, Indore.
- Bingley Waldemar Day, Indian Civil Service, Special Deputy Commissioner of Civil Supplies (on leave) Madras.
- Dharma Vira, Indian Civil Service, Deputy Secretary to the Government of India in the Industries and Civil Supplies Department.
- Charles Beresford Duke, Indian Political Service, Deputy Secretary to the Government of India in the External Affairs Department.
- George Emlyn Thomas Hulse Evans, MC, Indian Police, Deputy Inspector-General, Presidency Range, Bengal.
- Syed Fida Hassan, Indian Civil Service, Revenue Secretary to Financial Commissioners and Deputy Secretary to Government, Revenue Department, Punjab.
- Robert Galletti Di Cadilhac, Indian Civil Service, Joint Secretary, Board of Revenue, Madras.
- Khan Bahadur Hafiz Muhammad Ghazamfarullah, lately Member of the U.P. Legislative Assembly, Chairman, Improvement Trust, Allhabad, United Provinces.
- Colonel Harry Douglas Goldthorp, Director of Clothing, Directorate-General of Supply, Government of India.
- Raghuvansh Lal Gupta, Indian Civil Service Joint Financial Adviser, Food, Government of India.
- Major Phillip Cotes Hailey, Indian Political Service, Political Agent, Western Kathiawar Agency, Rajkot.
- Regjnald James Hawker, Controller, India Store Department, Office of the High Commissioner for India, London.
- William Hood, Chief Engineer, Great Indian Peninsula Railway, Bombay.
- Frank Edward Hough, Loco and Carriage Superintendent, His Exalted Highness the Nizam's State Railway and Chairman, Technical Training Committee, Hyderabad (Deccan).
- Colonel Geoffrey Bulmer Howell, MVO, MC, Military Secretary to His Excellency the Governor of Madras.
- Reginald George Hughff, Deputy Chief Mechanical Engineer, East Indian Railway, Jamalpur.
- Major Christopher Robert Jackman, Royal Artillery, Commandant, Civil Supplies Training Centre, Calcutta, Bengal.
- Major Jaswant Singh, MB, ChB, DPH, Indian Medical Service, Deputy Director, Malaria Institute of India.
- Sardar Abdur Rashid Khan, Indian Police, Assistant to the Inspector-General of Police, Traffic Branch, North-West Frontier Province.
- Khan Bahadur Mahboobali Niazali Khan, Deputy Director-General, Establishments (Retd.), Posts and Telegraphs, Directorate, New Delhi.
- Wilfred Howard Kirby, Rationing Adviser to the Government of India, Department of Food.
- Valavanur Subramanya Kuppuswamy, Indian Forest Service, Director, Timber Supplies Directorate, Southern Circle, Bombay.
- Ross Henry Donald Lowis, MBE, Indian Political Service, Deputy Commissioner, Kohat, North-West Frontier Province.
- Thomas Duncan Macintosh, Locomotive and Carriage Superintendent, Bombay, Baroda & Central India Railway, Ajmer.
- Temporary Lieutenant-Colonel William Morgan Tilson Magan, Indian Armoured Corps, General Staff Officer 1st Grade and Liaison Officer, Intelligence Bureau, Home Department, Government of India.
- William Christopher Maclean Magrath, Indian Police, officiating Deputy Inspector-General of Police, and lately Superintendent of Police, Bihar.
- Abdullah Khalid Malik, Indian Civil Service, Deputy Commissioner, Lyallpur, Punjab.
- Robert Manners, Messrs. James Finlay & Co. Ltd, Calcutta.
- William Topp McCallum, Manager of the Bombay Office of the Reserve Bank of India.
- Sidney James McCann, Managing Director, Messrs. United Motors, Limited, Bombay.
- Kumar Mitter, Docks Manager, Calcutta Port.
- Keki Merwangi Modi, Managing Director, Western Indian Theatres, Limited.
- Mohammed Khurshid, Indian Civil Service, Deputy Commissioner, Sylhet, Assam.
- Charles Forgan Morris, Messrs. James Finlay & Co. Ltd, Bombay.
- Thomas Hooper Morris, Controller of Stores, Bengal Nagpur Railway, Calcutta.
- Muhammad Azfar, Indian Civil Service, Secretary to the Government of Orissa, Education, Health and Local Self-Government Departments, and lately Deputy Commissioner of Sambalpur.
- Sardar Bahadur Sardar Narindar Singh, MBE, Controller of Clothing, Punjab Circle.
- Arthur Challoner Nixon, Chief Engineer of the Delhi Electric Supply & Traction Co. Ltd.
- William Robert Oaten, Deputy Chief Mechanical Engineer (Works), Golden Rock Workshops, South Indian Railway.
- Arthur Norman Odling, Director, Kalimpong Arts and Crafts.
- Lieutenant-Colonel Leonard Cayme Palk, Military Secretary to His Excellency the Governor of Bombay.
- Hugh James Paterson, AMIE, Indian Service of Engineers, Superintending Engineer, Central Public Works Department.
- Edwin Victor Austin Peers, Indian Police, Joint Secretary to Government, Central Provinces and Berar.
- James Roland Phillips, Indian Service of Engineers, Superintending Engineer, Northern Circle, Bombay.
- Arthur James Platt, Indian Civil Service, Private Secretary to His Excellency the Governor of Madras (on leave).
- Sukh Sagar Rachhpal, Banking Adviser to the Government of Bihar.
- Edward Radbone, Custodian of Enemy Property, Controller of Enemy Firms and Controller of Enemy Trading, Bombay.
- Daniel Albert Randall, Director, Tanning and Footwear Directorate, Directorate-General of Supply, Government of India.
- Khan Bahadur Haji Rashid Ahmad, Municipal Commissioner, Honorary Magistrate and Merchant, Delhi.
- Harold Ernest Rawlence, MD, FRCS (Ed.), Residency Surgeon, Srinagar (Kashmir).
- James Edward Reid, Indian Police, Deputy Inspector-General of Police, Assam.
- Bhut Nath Sarkar, MBE, Officiating Director of Agriculture, Bihar, and lately Food Controller and Deputy Secretary to Government, Bihar.
- Amarendra Nath Seal, Engineer-in-Chief, Lighthouse Department, Government of India.
- John Swithun Harvey Shattock, MBE, Indian Political Service, Deputy Secretary, Political Department, India.
- Lieutenant-Colonel James Smyth, Military Secretary to His Excellency the Governor of the United Provinces and Honorary Secretary, Soldiers', Sailors' and Airmen's Board, United Provinces.
- Edward Alec Abbott Snelson, Indian Civil Service, District and Sessions Judge (Officiating), Central Provinces and Berar.
- Lieutenant-Colonel Richard William Spear, MBE, Deputy Director-General (Postal Services), Posts and Telegraphs Directorate, New Delhi.
- Thomas George Percival Spear, lately Deputy Secretary to the Government of India in the Information and Broadcasting Department.
- John William Steadman, Assistant Chief Accounting Officer, Office of the High Commissioner for India, London.
- James Stephens, Indian Forest Service, Conservator of Forests, Utilisation Circle, Naini Tal, United Provinces.
- Thomas Stephenson, Chief Commercial Manager, Madras & Southern Mahratta Railway, Madras.
- Archibald McCorkell Stevenson, Field Controller of Military Accounts (Officers & Clearing House), Poona.
- Robert Currie Summerhayes, Agent, Messrs. Burmah-Shell Oil Company, Poona, Bombay.
- Vaidyanatha Ayyar Venkata Subramanyan, Indian Civil Service, Deputy Secretary to the Government of Madras, Finance Department.
- Norman Hillyard Swinstead, MBE, Deputy Director-General, Telegraphs, Posts and Telegraphs Directorate, New Delhi.
- Ganesh Govind Takle, Indian Forest Service, Deputy Conservator of Forests, Central Provinces and Berar.
- Mohan Lal Tanna, Barrister-at-Law, Special Officer, War Risks Insurance, Bombay.
- Henry John Bosanquet Taylor, Indian Civil Service, Deputy Commissioner, Ferozepore, Punjab.
- Colonel Charles Girdlestone Terrell, lately Member of the Assam Legislative Assembly, Medical Officer, Indian Tea Association, Assam.
- George William Murdoch Whittle, Indian Civil Service, Deputy Secretary to the Government of India in the Department of Supply, Branch Secretariat (Iron & Steel Control), Calcutta.
- Colonel Rowland George Williams, IRRO, Commandant, Internment Camp, Dehra Dun.
- Henry Murray Winn, Manager, Baluchistan Chrome Co. Ltd, Hindubagh.
- Masarrat Hussain Zuteeri, Indian Civil Service, Deputy Secretary to the Government of India in the Posts and Air Department.
- Percy de Vere Allen. Lately Labour Commissioner, Kenya.
- William John Anderson, Controller of Stores, Stores Department, Hong Kong. For services during internment.
- Edward Betham Beetham, Colonial Administrative Service, Chief Assistant Colonial Secretary, Sierra Leone.
- Maurice Christmas Bennett, Director, Department of Land Settlement, Palestine.
- Ernest James Blackaby, MRCS, LRCP, Colonial Medical Service, Medical Officer, Zanzibar.
- Thomas Findlay Bowman. For welfare services in British Honduras.
- Andrew Walton Brown. For services during internment in Hong Kong.
- Ethel Mary Louise Bryant, Colonial Nursing Service, Matron, Malaya. For services during internment.
- Ronald Paul Bush, Colonial Administrative Service, District Officer, Northern Rhodesia.
- John Awdry Cottrell Colonial Education Service, Education Officer, Northern Rhodesia.
- Frederick Crawford, Colonial Administrative Service, District Officer (Director of East African Produce Disposal & War Supplies Board), Tanganyika.
- William West Davidson, Colonial Administrative Service, Assistant Colonial Secretary, Bermuda.
- Kenneth Arthur Davies, PhD, Colonial Geological Survey Service, Director of Geological Survey, Uganda.
- Francis MacDonald Edmonds. For services during internment in Malaya.
- Henry James Evennett. For public services in Jamaica.
- Colonel John Patrick Fehily, MB, BCh, BAO, DPH, Colonial Medical Service, Hong Kong. For services in connexion with the re-occupation of Hong Kong.
- Colonel Peter Stanley Fernando, MBE, Municipal Engineer, Colombo, Ceylon.
- Harold Moyston Fisher, LDS, RCS, Senior Dental Surgeon, Tanganyika.
- Inez Galea. For welfare services in Malta.
- Lieutenant-Colonel Alan Gilroy, Officer Commanding No. 7 Malaria Field Laboratory, Nigeria.
- Gerald George Sydney James Hadlow. For welfare services in Nyasaland.
- James Owen Hall, Electrical Engineer-in-Chief, Nigeria.
- Bridget Hegarty, Colonial Nursing Service, Nursing Sister, Malaya. For services during internment.
- St. John Hodson. For social welfare services in Barbados.
- Evelyn Dennison Hone, Colonial Administrative Service, Secretary to Government, Seychelles.
- Kenneth Charles Jacobs, Receiver General, Gambia.
- John Lushington Edson Jeffery. For public services in the Leeward Islands.
- Brian Maurice Johns, MB, ChB, FRCS(Ed.), DTM&H, Colonial Medical Service, Surgeon, Malaya. For services during internment.
- Percy William King, Colonial Legal Service, Crown Solicitor, British Guiana.
- Stephanus Petrus Kruger, For services with the Agricultural Production & Settlement Board, Kenya.
- George Winslow Lock, Colonial Agricultural Service, Senior Agricultural Officer, Tanganyika Territory.
- John Ebenezer Longfield, District Officer, British North Borneo. For services prior to the Japanese invasion.
- Nicol Campbell MacLeod, MB, ChB, Colonial Medical Service, Deputy Director of Medical Services, Hong Kong. For services during internment.
- John Noel Milsum, Colonial Agricultural Service, Senior Agricultural Officer, Malaya. For services during internment.
- John Archibald Mulhall, Colonial Administrative Service, Secretary to the Governor, Ceylon.
- William Lionel Osborne, Director of Public Works, Aden.
- John Pace. Lately Treasurer, Malta.
- Richard Alan Pallister, MD, BS, MRCP, Colonial Medical Service, Medical Officer, Malaya. For services during internment.
- Ralph Stanley Watson Paterson, MC, Executive Engineer, Public Works Department, Hong Kong. For services during internment.
- David William Roberts. For public services and services in the Falkland Islands during the war.
- George Robertson, District Officer, British North Borneo. For services during internment.
- Thomas Reid Robertson, Poll Tax Commissioner, Mauritius.
- J. G. Shaw, Chief of Fire Brigade, Singapore Municipal Commission, Straits Settlements. For services during internment.
- Margaret Smallwood, MB, BS, Colonial Medical Service, Lady Medical Officer, Malaya. For services during internment.
- Captain William Anthony Casterton Smelt, Treasurer, British North Borneo. For services during internment.
- Dean Abbott Smith, MB, BCh, Colonial Medical Service, Medical Officer, Hong Kong. For services during internment.
- Katherine Stewart, Colonial Nursing Service, Matron, Malaya. For services during internment.
- Philip Patrick Taylor, Controller of Transport and Marketing, Cyprus.
- Sarran Teelucksingh, For public services in Trinidad.
- Cedric Lindley Todd, Colonial Audit Service, Deputy Auditor, Kenya.
- William Urquhart, Senior District Engineer, Kenya & Uganda Railways.
- Lieutenant-Colonel Aubrey P. Wallich. For service in connection with the re-occupation of Malaya.
- Lieutenant-Colonel John Weekley, Officer Commanding Perak Local Defence Force. For services during internment.
- Arnold Williamson. For public services in Grenada, Windward Islands.
- Captain John McNie Wingate, Colonial Agricultural Service, Senior Agricultural Officer, Gold Coast.
- John Francis Winter. For public and Civil Defence services in Nigeria.
- George Ernest Francis Wood. Government Statistician, Palestine.

Honorary Officers

- Daniel Auster. Lately Councillor and Deputy Mayor of Jerusalem, Palestine.
- The Reverend Okon Efiong. For public services in Nigeria.
- Mbarak Ali Hinawy, Liwali for the Coast, Kenya.

=== Order of the Companions of Honour (CH) ===
- Professor Archibald Vivian Hill, OBE, ScD, DSc, LLD, FRS, a Secretary of the Royal Society. For scientific services.

=== Imperial Service Medal ===
- Biseswar Ram, Head Jamadar, Government House, Calcutta, Bengal.
- Ganesh Prasad, Head Constable, Central Provinces and Berar.
- Hari Singh, Jemadar, Office of the Private Secretary to His Excellency the Viceroy.
- Imamkhan Najukhan, Jemadar, Drugs Control Branch, Office of the Superintendent of Excise, Bombay.
- Walter Thomas Lockyer, Established Messenger, First Class, Office of the High Commissioner for India, London.
- Madhu Laxman, Armed III Grade Head Constable, Panch Mahals District, Bombay.
- Manbhal Singh, Line Inspector, Telegraphs, Nagpur Sub-Division, Nagpur.
- Vellore Srinivasalu Naidu, Overseer Postman, Vepery Sub-Division Madras.
- Puria, Jemadar, Office of the Private Secretary to His Excellency the Viceroy.
- Pyarelal Chudaman, Armed II Grade Head Constable, West Khandesh District, Bombay.
- Ram Jiwan, Head Constable, Central Provinces and Berar.
- Zainul Abdin, Head Constable, Railway Police, Ajmer-Merwara.

=== Royal Navy ===
==== Distinguished Service Order ====
- Captain Arthur David Torlesse.

==== Distinguished Service Cross ====
- Commander John Oliver Chambers, RD, RNR.
- Commander Andrew Douglas Holden, OBE, RNZNR.
- Temporary Acting Commander Harry Layland Dudley Hoare, RNR.
- Engineer Commander David Anderson Smart.
- Lieutenant Commander Geoffrey Thrippleton Marr, RNR.
- Lieutenant Commander Robert William Wainewright.
- Lieutenant Commander Frank Henry Albert, RANVR.
- Acting Lieutenant Commander Ian Eaton.
- Lieutenant Commander (E) James Pitcairn de Egglesfield Robinson, RNR.
- Acting Lieutenant Commander Hugh Alexander Mackenzie, RAN.
- Temporary Lieutenant Commander (E) Alfred George Hurley, RNR.
- Temporary Lieutenant Commander (E) Thomas Woods, RNR.
- Temporary Acting Lieutenant Commander Philip Edward Kitto, RNR.
- Temporary Acting Lieutenant Commander Reginald Anderson Aldred, RNVR.
- Temporary Acting Lieutenant Commander Thomas Norman Baker, RNR.
- Temporary Acting Lieutenant Commander Ewart Stanley Brookes, RNVR.
- Temporary Acting Lieutenant Commander Arthur Frederick Boumphrey, RNVR.
- Temporary Acting Lieutenant Commander Arnold Cookson, RNVR.
- Temporary Acting Lieutenant Commander David Hannah, RNVR.
- Temporary Acting Lieutenant Commander Leonard Henry Hill, RNVR.
- Temporary Acting Lieutenant Commander Francis Cecil Corbet Knight, RNVR.
- Temporary Acting Lieutenant Commander Alfred Gerald Leach, RNVR.
- Temporary Acting Lieutenant Commander Richard Arthur Snell, RNVR.
- Instructor Lieutenant Commander Arthur Edward Charles Ellis, BSc.
- Lieutenant Richard Cecil Dumas.
- Lieutenant Arthur Colin O'Riordan.
- Lieutenant Alexander Henry Brittain, RANVR.
- Lieutenant Clarence Askew Byrne, RANVR.
- Temporary Lieutenant John Douglas Barber, RNVR.
- Temporary Lieutenant Colin Stanley Finnigan, RNVR.
- Temporary Lieutenant George Ernest Fox, RNVR.
- Temporary Lieutenant George Johnstone Milligan, RNVR.
- Temporary Lieutenant John Basil Swann, RNVR.
- Temporary Lieutenant Reginald Eric Warren, RNVR.
- Temporary Lieutenant (A) Maung Sway Tin, RNVR.
- Temporary Lieutenant (E) John Dawson Cooper.
- Temporary Lieutenant (E) Stephen Knott Amer, RNR.
- Temporary Lieutenant (E) Stanley Austwick, RNR.
- Temporary Lieutenant (E) William Stevenson Cuthbertson, RNR.
- Temporary Lieutenant (E) Mathew McNaught, RNR.
- Temporary Lieutenant (E) Thomas Heath Simpson, RNR.
- Temporary Acting Lieutenant (A) Michael Marshall Watkins Hancock, RNVR.
- Temporary Skipper Lieutenant George Dean Barker, RNR.
- Acting Skipper Lieutenant John Coxall, RNR.
- Acting Skipper Lieutenant James Alexander Simpson, RNR, W.S.2778
- Temporary Sub-Lieutenant Alfred Winder Rushworth, RNVR.
- Temporary Acting Sub-Lieutenant (E) Arthur Bailey, RNVR.
- Commissioned Gunner William Benjamin James Harding.
- Gunner (T) Arthur James Bernand Pannell.
- Temporary Gunner (T) Robert Brownlee.
- Acting Warrant Shipwright George Craven Tate.
- Commissioned Stores Officer Reginald Arthur Price.

Bar to the Distinguished Service Cross

- Temporary Acting Commander Robert Wilson Ellis, DSC, RNR.
- Temporary Acting Lieutenant Commander Byron Albert Caws, DSC, RNR.
- Temporary Acting Lieutenant Commander Frank Tasker, DSC, RNR.

==== Distinguished Service Medal ====
- Chief Petty Officer William Ernest Eales, CJ/115367.
- Chief Petty Officer Wilfred Halliday, D/J46662.
- Chief Petty Officer William Frank Rice, P/J105735.
- Chief Petty Officer John Octavius Mathieson Watson, CD/6.
- Acting Chief Petty Officer George Edward Cross, D/JX125679.
- Acting Chief Petty Officer Henry Valentine Biggs, C/SSX14653.
- Acting Chief Petty Officer Sydney Armet, P/JX148468.
- Temporary Chief Petty Officer Frederick William Buchan, C/J113251.
- Temporary Chief Petty Officer Frederick Charles Gould, C/JX130427.
- Chief Yeoman of Signals Charles Frederick Cowen, D/JX131619.
- Temporary Chief Yeoman of Signals Albert Samuel Burrell, D/J110636.
- Chief Petty Officer Telegraphist William Robert Frederick Glasspool, P/JX136829.
- Chief Petty Officer Telegraphist Philip Charles Hadden, C/JX128740.
- Chief Petty Officer Telegraphist Leslie Thomas Young, SV288, RANVR.
- Chief Engineroom Artificer John Grove Pearce, D/MX49463.
- Chief Electrical Artificer Ronald Charles Hanning, D/M35629.
- Chief Electrical Artificer William Kennedy Steuart, 17716, RAN.
- Engineroom Artificer 2nd class Harold John Hindes, SA/NF(V)562370.
- Engineroom Artificer 3rd class Alexander Ball, D/MX59400.
- Engineroom Artificer 3rd class Gordon Charles Albert Francis, P/MX52241.
- Engineroom Artificer 3rd class Arthur Martlew, D/MX63478.
- Electrical Artificer 3rd class Percy Land, D/MX63345.
- Electrical Artificer 3rd class Robert Andrew Wilsher, FAA/FX77819.
- Ordnance Artificer 2nd class John Geoffrey Faulkner, P/MX51368.
- Mechanician 1st class Harold Burgess, P/KX82492.
- Temporary Chief Shipwright Ronald Stephen Colbern, P/MX54401.
- Chief Stoker David Marcus Kent, D/K62613.
- Chief Engineman Joseph Teasdale, LT/X10090.
- Chief Engineman John William Andrew Downie, LT/KX106806.
- Chief Engineman Cyril Albert Haggar, LT/KX125033.
- Chief Engineman Christian Albert de Berg, LT/KX100186.
- Chief Engineman Fred Holford, LT/KX131544.
- Acting Chief Engineman Reginald George Clark, LT/KX107508.
- Acting Chief Engineman Sidney Clarence Colman, LT/KX127087.
- Chief Carpenter Jack Edmeads, NAP/R127331.
- Chief Carpenter Geoffrey Thomas Osborne, NAP/R201094.
- Stores Chief Petty Officer Edward Hearn, P/MX47029.
- Chief Petty Officer Cook (S) Percival Webber, D/M36048.
- Second Hand George Leask, LT/JX242530.
- Petty Officer William Foster, D/J112980.
- Petty Officer William Matthew Goddard, D/JX133844.
- Petty Officer Richard Cecil Godwin, LT/JX195767.
- Petty Officer Thomas Herkes Grant, LT/JX205014.
- Petty Officer James Frederick Robinson, LT/JX224437.
- Petty Officer Edmund Slater, D/JX159073.
- Petty Officer Roger James Wiggins, P/JX153355.
- Petty Officer Alfred Woodcock, C/JX133478.
- Temporary Petty Officer George Edward Jones, D/J111304.
- Temporary Petty Officer Albert Lawrence Stevens, D/J97790.
- Petty Officer Air Fitter (E) Edwin Gowling, FAA/FX99639.
- Yeoman of Signals Horace Maynard Hayfield, D/JX141996.
- Temporary Yeoman of Signals Vernon Christian Coulter, B.1531, RAN.
- Temporary Yeoman of Signals Ernest John Nightingill, C/SSX30603.
- Petty Officer Telegraphist David Owen O'Connor, P/J108811.
- Temporary Petty Officer Telegraphist Charles William Frederick Hammond, C/JX148595.
- Petty Officer Engineman Charles Edward Paterson Young, LT/KX105746.
- Engineman Robert Sutton Carmichael, LT/KX148773.
- Engineman John William Stephen, LT/KX124874.
- Air Artificer 4th class John Henry Povey, FAA/FX83207.
- Petty Officer Air Mechanic (O) Reginald Woodstock Stiles, FAA/FX77538.
- Stoker Petty Officer Gordon Henry McDonnell, 13734, RAN.
- Acting Stoker Petty Officer Edgar Boothroyd, D/KX96374.
- Temporary Stoker Petty Officer Henry McLean, P/KX82807.
- Petty Officer Writer Raymond Pollitt, P/MX81205.
- Petty Officer Steward Bertram Reginald Charles Taylor, D/LX21073.
- Acting Flight Sergeant Robert Cambrai Goodfellow, 567651, Royal Air Force.
- Leading Seaman Bernard Louis Battrick, D/J109914.
- Leading Seaman Hector Paterson McSporran Brodie, X0440B, RNR.
- Leading Seaman Walter Charles King, LT/JX194320.
- Leading Seaman Frank Tunstall, LT/JX287578
- Temporary Acting Leading Seaman Robert Geoffrey Head, P/JX2017889.
- Temporary Acting Leading Seaman Charles John Muggridge, P/JX276439.
- Leading Wireman Norman James Braybrook, C/MX96992.
- Leading Wireman Peter Frederick Pitts, C/MX66274.
- Leading Signalman Percy Hacking, P/JX398230.
- Leading Seaman Charles Higgins, LT/JX218243.
- Acting Leading Telegraphist James Craig Arkison, P/SSX32361.
- Acting Leading Telegraphist Colin Malcolm McEachern, S.3509, RANR.
- Leading Coder Campbell Fleay, RAN.24724.
- Temporary Acting Leading Coder Ernest Edwin Wilkes, D/JX200620.
- Temporary Leading Stores Assistant George Munro, P/MX81298.
- Leading Writer Geoffrey Laurence Carden, S.3929, RANR.
- Leading Cook Henri Francois Camus, LT/MK87775.
- Leading Radio Mechanic John Garth Roberts, P/MX634756.
- Wireman Edward Adams, C/MX71443.
- Wireman Donald Albert Shipman, C/MX655501.
- Able Seaman Bernard Thomas Cannon, C/LDX2697.
- Able Seaman Raymond Reginald Collins, S.6112, RANR.
- Able Seaman Edward McCoy, D/JX302546.
- Able Seaman Eric Clinton Mole, 22185, RAN.
- Acting Able Seaman William Kelly, D/JX257109.
- Signalman Henry Percival Jacobs, LT/JX251086.
- Signalman Stanley Walter Megson, LT/JX211249.
- Signalman William Tomkinson, LT/JX401692.
- Telegraphist Geoffrey Pennick, LT/JX277587.
- Storekeeper 1st class Allan Rennie, NAP/R60121.
- Ordinary Signalman Harold Gordon Lucas, LT/JX341350.
- Seaman Richard Marston Cridland, LT/JX234204.
- Seaman Charles Edward Valentine Loomes, LT/JX265012.
- Seaman Ernest Thomas Vale, LT/JX192166.
- Seaman John Henry Wilkinson, LT/JX378884.
- Seaman Gunner William Charles Bruce Wilson, LT/JX241305.
- Marine Vincent James Charles Baker, Ply.20826.

==== Mention in Despatches ====
- Captain Hilary Worthington Biggs, DSO.
- Captain Wilfred Geoffrey Brittain, CBE.
- Captain John Ronald Stewart Brown.
- Captain (Commodore 2nd Class) William Power Carne, (Retd).
- Captain Charles Richard Vernon Pugh.
- Captain Reginald Frederick Nichols.
- Captain Leonard Chisholm Sinker, DSC.
- Captain Robert William Stirling-Hamilton.
- Captain Herbert Wyndham Williams.
- Captain Herbert James Buchanan, DSO, Royal Australian Navy.
- Acting Captain Charles Ernest Maconochie, OBE.
- Acting Captain Sir Charles Edward Madden, Bt..
- Acting Captain David Henry Magnay.
- Acting Captain Christopher McCabe Merewether, (Retd).
- Commander John Pollington Apps, DSC, (Retd.)
- Commander David Lampen, DSO.
- Commander Michael Le Fanu, DSC.
- Commander John Hext Lewes, OBE.
- Commander Michael Wilfred Tomkinson.
- Commander Charles George Cuthbertson, DSC, RNR.
- Acting Commander Trevor George Payne Crick, OBE, DSC.
- Acting Commander Leslie Henry Trevor Hollebone, OBE.
- Acting Commander Arthur John Talbot Roe, OBE, DSO.
- Surgeon Commander William McOric MacGregor, OBE, VD, MB, BCh, MRCS, LRCP, RNVR.
- Commander (S) Arthur Lewis.
- Lieutenant Commander Francis Cumberland Broderick.
- Lieutenant Commander John Errol Manners, DSC.
- Lieutenant Commander George Oliver Roberts.
- Lieutenant Commander Philip Mark Stephens.
- Lieutenant Commander William Whitworth, DSC.
- Lieutenant Commander Ian Leslie MacGregor, RNVR.
- Lieutenant Commander Thomas Reginald Milsolm Cole, Burma RNVR.
- Lieutenant Commander Robert Bruce Glendinning, Burma RNVR.
- Acting Lieutenant Commander Maurice O'Brien Fitzgerald.
- Acting Lieutenant Commander Charles Piercy Mills.
- Temporary Lieutenant Commander (Sp) Gerald Grant Bremner, RNVR.
- Temporary Acting Lieutenant Commander Alan Foxall, RNR.
- Temporary Acting Lieutenant Commander Archibald Jewison Herbert, RNR.
- Temporary Acting Lieutenant Commander Robert Mowbray, RNR.
- Temporary Acting Lieutenant Commander Francis Herbert Revel, RNR.
- Temporary Acting Lieutenant Commander Reginald Henry Robert Brittain, RNVR.
- Temporary Acting Lieutenant Commander Bruce Thomson Carey, RNVR.
- Temporary Acting Lieutenant Commander John Stuart Lawrence, DSC, RNVR.
- Temporary Acting Lieutenant Commander William Geoffrey Hewett, DSC, RNVR.
- Temporary Acting Lieutenant Commander Ernest Henry Moore, RNVR.
- Lieutenant Commander (E) Edward John Murray.
- Temporary Acting Lieutenant Commander (E) Bryan Noel Inman Maude-Roxby.
- Temporary Acting Lieutenant Commander (E) Trevor Seymour.
- Temporary Lieutenant Commander (E) William Bruce Nisbet, DSC, RNR.
- Temporary Acting Lieutenant Commander (E) David Johnston Pasley, RNR.
- Surgeon Lieutenant Commander (D) Philip Vernham Peatfield, LDS.
- Acting Lieutenant Commander (S) Horace Collier Lyddon.
- Temporary Acting Lieutenant Commander (S) William Alfred Dawson, RNVR.
- Temporary Major William George Southcote Aston, Royal Marines.
- The Reverend Lancelot Mason, MA, Temporary Chaplain, RNVR.
- Lieutenant Robin Francis Buller.
- Lieutenant Oswald Manuel Blaxland de Las Cassas.
- Lieutenant David Edward Bousquet Field.
- Lieutenant William Woodhouse Haynes.
- Lieutenant Anthony Gresham McCrum.
- Lieutenant Michael John Wake Pawsey.
- Lieutenant Henry Ernest Sellwood, DSC.
- Lieutenant George Cardew Robertson, RNR.
- Lieutenant Gordon Wray Sudlow, RNR.
- Temporary Lieutenant Frank Newton Battersby, RNVR.
- Temporary Lieutenant Cuthbert Boole, RNVR.
- Temporary Lieutenant Jeffrey Maurice Browning, RNVR.
- Temporary Lieutenant Norman Atkins Cope, RNVR.
- Temporary Lieutenant Arthur James Coppock, RNVR.
- Temporary Lieutenant George Milne Dickson, RNVR.
- Temporary Lieutenant Francis Bernard Dineen, RNVR.
- Temporary Lieutenant Thomas Drummond, RNVR.
- Temporary Lieutenant Robert Leadam Eddison, RNVR.
- Temporary Lieutenant Frederick James Gill, RNVR.
- Temporary Lieutenant Colin Hustler, RNVR.
- Temporary Lieutenant Edward Frederick James, RNVR.
- Temporary Lieutenant Richard Patrick Jones, RNVR.
- Temporary Lieutenant James Montague Knight, RNVR.
- Temporary Lieutenant Peter Eric Lee, RNVR.
- Temporary Lieutenant Stewart MacMorran, RNVR.
- Temporary Lieutenant Percy Pearce, RNVR.
- Temporary Lieutenant Kenneth Jack Roper Sharland, RNVR.
- Temporary Lieutenant Eric Sheard, RNVR.
- Temporary Lieutenant Thomas Arthur Snow, RNVR.
- Temporary Lieutenant Harold Underwood Thompson, RNVR.
- Temporary Lieutenant Harold Tonge, RNVR.
- Temporary Acting Lieutenant Henry Charles Trump, RNVR.
- Temporary Lieutenant (Sp) John Walter Lloyd Zehetmayr, RNVR.
- Lieutenant John Harold Savin Osborn, Royal Australian Navy.
- Lieutenant Colin Swinburne Martin, RANVR.
- Lieutenant Arthur Geoffrey Terence Dane, RIN.
- Lieutenant (Sp) George Addicott, RINVR.
- Temporary Lieutenant Alfred Clifford Ebbs, RINVR.
- Temporary Lieutenant (Sp) Bernard Joseph Tonks, RNZNVR.
- Lieutenant Donald Graham Chisholm, SANF(V).
- Lieutenant Darrien Ivan Stubbs, SANF.
- Temporary Lieutenant (A) John de Morgan Campbell Thompson, RNVR.
- Lieutenant (E) Walter George Burden.
- Lieutenant (E) Edward Murray Halley.
- Lieutenant (E) Charles Edward Over.
- Acting Lieutenant (E) Horace Frank Chaplin.
- Temporary Lieutenant (E) Robert Flinders Jackson.
- Temporary Lieutenant (E) Norman Freight, RNR.
- Temporary Lieutenant (E) Thomas Kirk, RNR.
- Temporary Lieutenant (E) William Heslop Langley, RNR.
- Temporary Surgeon Lieutenant Terence Edgar Barwell, MRCS, LRCP, RNVR.
- Temporary Surgeon Lieutenant Alexander Fraser Ross, MB, ChB, RNVR.
- Lieutenant (S) Dennis John Patrick Calnan.
- Lieutenant (S) Owen Ernest John Wade.
- Temporary Lieutenant (S) Maurice Charles William Penning, RNVR.
- Temporary Lieutenant (S) Arthur Kenneth Roach, RNVR.
- Temporary Electrical Lieutenant David Noel Ellingham, RNVR.
- Temporary Shipwright Lieutenant John Fisher Haxton.
- Skipper Lieutenant John Leader Borrett, W.S.2964, RNR.
- Acting Skipper Lieutenant William Buchan, W.S.3426, RNR.
- Acting Skipper Lieutenant William Rigby, W.S.2727, RNR.
- Temporary Acting Skipper Lieutenant Robert Herbert Soanes, DSC, T.S.103, RNR.
- Acting Chief Skipper Fred Clark Stephen, W.S.2879, RNR.
- Temporary Skipper William Henry Linstead, T.S.1027, RNR.
- Temporary Skipper Percy Edward Robinson, T.S.870, RNR.
- Temporary Skipper Philip Sanson Stevenson, T.S.678, RNR.
- Temporary Sub-Lieutenant (Sp) John Philip Backhouse Gardner, RNVR.
- Temporary Sub-Lieutenant Sidney George Hawksley, RNVR.
- Temporary Sub-Lieutenant Richard Nicholas Knapp-Fisher, RNVR.
- Temporary Sub-Lieutenant George William Payne, RNVR.
- Temporary Sub-Lieutenant Albert Charles Pearce, RNVR.
- Temporary Sub-Lieutenant Douglas Arthur Roberts, RNVR.
- Temporary Sub-Lieutenant Frederick William Thomas Taylor, RNVR.
- Temporary Sub-Lieutenant (A) Kenneth John Davis, RNVR.
- Temporary Sub-Lieutenant (A) Denis Webb Stairs, RNVR.
- Temporary Sub-Lieutenant (E) Harold Crofton Barron, RNVR.
- Temporary Acting Sub-Lieutenant (E) William Henry Lambelle, RNVR.
- Temporary Acting Sub-Lieutenant (E) Benjamin Frank Williamson, RNVR.
- Mr. Thomas Bate Burge, Commissioned Gunner (T).
- Mr. Leslie Herbert Nash, Temporary Commissioned Gunner.
- Mr. Thomas Henry Worsfold, DSM, Gunner (T).
- Mr. Joseph Frederick William Sharpe, Temporary Gunner.
- Mr. Henry Surry, Temporary Signal Boatswain.
- Mr. Albert William James Newling, Acting Commissioned Engineer.
- Mr. Charles Frederick Gilbert, Warrant Engineer.
- Mr. Thomas Frederick Goyns, Warrant Engineer.
- Mr. Herbert Cecil Shepheard, Warrant Engineer.
- Mr. Sidney Sherry, Warrant Engineer.
- Mr. Cecil Arthur Studd, Temporary Warrant Engineer.
- Mr. Sydney John Hill, Warrant Shipwright.
- Mr. Leslie Charles Lewendon, Warrant Shipwright.
- Mr. James Joseph Tudor, Warrant Shipwright.
- Mr. William Henry Ryder Temporary Warrant Shipwright.
- Mr. Horace Bunting, Warrant Electrician.
- Mr. Arthur William Giles, Warrant Electrician.
- Mr. James Alexander Brownlee, Warrant Ordnance Officer.
- Mr. William Henry Garvey, Acting Warrant Catering Officer, NAP/R.63322.
- Mr. William John Dyer, Temporary Warrant Writer Officer.
- Boatswain Antonio Esteves, NAP.1132509.
- Chief Petty Officer Robert Vernon Bell, D/J113883.
- Chief Petty Officer Edgar George Cleall, C/J107604.
- Chief Petty Officer William Cowie, LT/JX280366
- Chief Petty Officer George Arthur Edwards, P/J114070.
- Chief Petty Officer William Rowland Foreman, P/J106836.
- Chief Petty Officer Harry Charles Fright, DSM, C/J104271.
- Chief Petty Officer Ronald Woods Mullender, LT/JX212723.
- Chief Petty Officer Leonard William Peckham, C/JX132896.
- Temporary Chief Petty Officer George Greenley Hutchings, D/J107170.
- Temporary Chief Petty Officer Ernest Colquhoun Manifold, C/J45745.
- Temporary Chief Petty Officer Samuel John Mutton, D/JX95364.
- Temporary Chief Petty Officer Edward James Parsons, D/J108736.
- Acting Chief Petty Officer Ernest Joseph Sargent, LT/JX17979A.
- Temporary Chief Petty Officer Albert Wagstaff, P/J114423.
- Temporary Chief Petty Officer Gilbert Harold Wells, M.12878, RAN.
- Temporary Chief Petty Officer Samuel David Ernest James William Williams, D/JX129903.
- Master-at-Arms William Norman Harvey, D/M.39828.
- Master-at-Arms Sidney Jack Hookham, C/M.39916.
- Master-at-Arms Walter Geoffrey Phillips, BEM, P/M.40186.
- Temporary Master-at-Arms Edgar John Clark, D/MX61886.
- Chief Petty Officer Telegraphist Horace Richard Cooper, C/JX126533.
- Chief Petty Officer Telegraphist Mohd Hanif, RIN. 3073.
- Chief Petty Officer Telegraphist Sidney James Marker, D/J107829.
- Chief Petty Officer Telegraphist Ernest Eugene Strasser, P/SSX19223.
- Temporary Chief Petty Officer Telegraphist George James Henry Sears, M.21156. RAN.
- Temporary Chief Petty Officer Telegraphist John Banks Williams, S.19566. RAN.
- Chief Engineroom Artificer Reginald James Barrow, C/M.36095.
- Chief Engineroom Artificer John Button, C/MX49882.
- Chief Engineroom Artificer Clifford Coupe, DSM, P/MX48347.
- Chief Engineroom Artificer Harold Crapper, P/MX48375.
- Chief Engineroom Artificer Edmund Dear, C/MX49181.
- Chief Engineroom Artificer Austin John March, P/MX52981.
- Chief Engineroom Artificer John Edward George Oldham, D/MX49128.
- Chief Engineroom Artificer Jeremiah Quinlan, P/MX51716.
- Chief Engineroom Artificer Frederick Charles Sandell, D/M.37014.
- Acting Chief Engineroom Artificer William Albert Percy Sandell, C/M.27293.
- Chief Engineroom Artificer Samuel Skelton, C/MX506491.
- Chief Engineroom Artificer Henry Watty Tregembo, D/MX50454.
- Chief Engineroom Artificer Arthur Roy Twine, P/M.37656.
- Chief Engineroom Artificer Arthur Leglie Whiting, C/M.37084.
- Temporary Chief Engineroom Artificer Wilfrid Benjamin Cox, C/MX45611.
- Temporary Acting Chief Engineroom Artificer Douglas Reginald Wells, C/MX56985.
- Engineroom Artificer 1st Class Hector Miller, RAN. 16727.
- Engineroom Artificer 2nd Class John Hurlbent Davies, P/MX53650.
- Engineroom Artificer 3rd Class George Duncan Barlow, C/MX60738.
- Engineroom Artificer 3rd Class Gordon Leslie Bruty, C/MX53086.
- Engineroom Artificer 3rd Class Gabriel David, RIN. 6544.
- Engineroom Artificer 3rd Class Norman Clifford Lake, C/MX55032.
- Engineroom Artificer 3rd Class Andrew Paton, P/MX57508.
- Engineroom Artificer 3rd Class Charles Alfred Thomas Russell, C/MX51778.
- Engineroom Artificer 3rd Class Lawrence Frank Wilson, M.24130, RAN.
- Chief Engineman James William Damerall, LT/KX105230.
- Chief Engineman William Frederick Hogg, LT/KX112866.
- Chief Engineman Edward Leask, LT/X467E.U.
- Chief Engineman James Quemby Trever, LT/KX125093.
- Chief Engineman Gilbert West, LT/KX107974.
- Chief Engineman John Andrew Armitage, LT/X102055, RNR.
- Acting Chief Engineman Frederick William Fisher, L/X3595T.
- Engineman (Acting Chief) Alfred William Sawyer, LT/KX127496.
- Chief Electrical Artificer Donald Samuel George Blake, P/MX49218.
- Chief Electrical Artificer Cecil Henry Thomas Connorton, C/MX620206.
- Chief Electrical Artificer Lewis Gilbert, P/MX47099.
- Chief Electrical Artificer Claude Hills, P/MX49535.
- Chief Electrical Artificer Ian Graham Macdonald, D/MX59971.
- Chief Electrical Artificer Kevin Cecil Jenner Miles, SANF.(V) 71784.
- Chief Electrical Artificer Leonard Francis Warren, C/MX55070.
- Electrical Artificer David George Vivian Fowles, P/MX68022.
- Electrical Artificer 3rd Class Leonard Cecil Lowth, P/MX88518.
- Electrical Artificer 3rd Class Lionel William Step, D/MX54060.
- Temporary Electrical Artificer 3rd Class Herbert Roland Stevens, P/MX102299.
- Chief Ordnance Artificer Robert James Scott, C/MX53233.
- Chief Ordnance Artificer Eric Hucknall, P/MX54277.
- Chief Shipwright Arthur John Lambkin, BEM, C/M.6342.
- Chief Shipwright Kenneth Eric Marks, C/MX97888.
- Chief Stoker Charles Daniel Barrell, D/K.66615.
- Chief Stoker Harold Stephen Crapps, D/K.61991.
- Chief Stoker Cecil Ernest Farley, C/K.66447.
- Chief Stoker Stanley Victor Finch, C/K.63300.
- Chief Stoker James August Gallie, RAN.17484.
- Chief Stoker Herbert Green, C/K.56363.
- Chief Stoker Frederick Henry Hibbert, C/K.58818.
- Chief Stoker Frederick Howard Jarvis, D/K.67108.
- Chief Stoker John Henry Ockenden, DSM, C/K.65327.
- Chief Stoker Thomas Pallett, C/KX79812.
- Chief Stoker Henry Toone, P/K.61729.
- Chief Stoker Frederick Snelling Warner, C/K.52631.
- Chief Stoker Thomas Paton Wood, P/KX76671.
- Temporary Chief Stoker Arthur Percival Edmunds, C/K.60455.
- Temporary Chief Stoker Richard Edwards, D/KX77796.
- Mechanician 1st Class Robert William Hutchinson, D/KX89413.
- Mechanician 1st Class Jeremiah John Sullivan, P/KX88762.
- Second Hand Richard William Bayes, LT/JX200826.
- Second Hand John Henry Hetherington Claxton, LT/JX193004.
- Second Hand Ernest Duncan, LT/X21009A. R.N.P.S.
- Second Hand Walter Thomas Frederick Dyble, LT/JX209098.
- Second Hand William Henry Heath, LT/JX224870, R.N.P.S.
- Second Hand Andrew Summers, LT/JX242383.
- Second Hand Peter Wood, LT/JX225695.
- Sick Berth Chief Petty Officer John Edward Anthony, P/M.22938.
- Sick Berth Chief Petty Officer Harry Burton, C/MX48636.
- Sick Berth Chief Petty Officer Douglas George Heath, C/M.37277.
- Sick Berth Chief Petty Officer Edgar Percy Spelman, C/M.39010.
- Sick Berth Chief Petty Officer Arthur Gordon White, D/MX47017.
- Chief Petty Officer Writer Stanley Rudolph Bartlett, D/MX49437.
- Temporary Stores Chief Petty Officer Cyril Henry Knight, D/MX47605.
- Chief Petty Officer Cook (S) Howard Moore, D/M.38498.
- Chief Cook 1st class John Surr, NAP/R.50783.
- Colour Sergeant George Albert Stroud, Po.X1165, Royal Marines.
- Petty Officer Henry Ashton, D/JX139366.
- Petty Officer Ivor Lewis Burgwin Badham, D/JX128425.
- Petty Officer John White Cameron, N.Z.1034.
- Petty Officer Reginald Cheesmore, P/JX132529.
- Petty Officer Peter Richard Davis, DSM, LT/JX209070.
- Petty Officer George Frederick Hosey, LT/Sr.76402.
- Petty Officer George Howard, LT/JX199693.
- Petty Officer Edward Howells, LT/X72070.
- Petty Officer George James Hudson, D/X8109C, RNR.
- Petty Officer Phillip Edgar Hurst, LT/JX190075.
- Petty Officer Andrew Mcalister, D/JX152819.
- Petty Officer Christopher Frederick Michaels, LT/JX279747.
- Petty Officer Richard Alfred Verdun Rowsell, D/JX137277.
- Petty Officer John Smith, LT/X10111B.
- Petty Officer Andrew Tin-Lay, Burma 502.
- Petty Officer Gilbert George Spence, LT/JX179575.
- Petty Officer Ernest David Vickery, D/JX139267.
- Petty Officer George Clarke Weston, C/JX135416.
- Petty Officer Sidney Wood, P/JX125797.
- Acting Petty Officer Ronald Austin James Hole, D/JX168390.
- Temporary Acting Petty Officer William Richard Jarvis, C/LDX5388.
- Temporary Petty Officer George Walter Mackenzie, P/JX135499.
- Temporary Petty Officer Thomas Nichol, D/SSX22832.
- Temporary Petty Officer Roland Payne, C/TD/X1940.
- Temporary Petty Officer (Radar) Stanley Kirby, D/SSX28448.
- Petty Officer Wireman (L) Richard Charles Dunn, P/MX64479.
- Petty Officer Wireman (M/S) John Stuart Lovell, C/MX67503.
- Yeoman of Signals Hugh Bunting, P/JX142379.
- Yeoman of Signals George Christie, C/JX143528.
- Yeoman of Signals Arthur Evans, D/JX135031.
- Yeoman of Signals Gerald Edward Sheppard, D/J81750.
- Temporary Petty Officer, Telegraphist George Harry Brown, C/SSX22250.
- Petty Officer Telegraphist William Charles Hornery, S.21676, RAN.
- Petty Officer Telegraphist Sydney David Beatty Moores, D/JX135615.
- Petty Officer Telegraphist Joseph Campbell Shiell, D/JX134397.
- Petty Officer Telegraphist Leonard Frederick Winsborough, C/JX134344.
- Temporary Petty Officer Telegraphist Roderick Short, P/JX144727.
- Temporary Petty Officer Telegraphist Phillip James Sproson, D/JX143880.
- Engineroom Artificer 4th class Clarence Edgar Baker, F.4690, RAN.
- Engineroom Artificer George Arthur Kinsman, Burma 176.
- Engineroom Artificer 4th class John Leishman, C/ MX691971.
- Engineroom Artificer 4th class Robert Victor James Mazonowicz, C/MX507819.
- Engineroom Artificer 4th class Jack Woodsford, FAA/FX584766.
- Electrical Artificer 4th class Edward Toomer Broomfield Chapman, S.6470, RAN.
- Electrical Artificer 4th class John Arthur Edward Lloyd, P/MX99589.
- Stoker Petty Officer Maurice Handsley, P/KX86294.
- Temporary Stoker Petty Officer Albert Edward Armistice Coomber, C/KX90454.
- Temporary Stoker Petty Officer Walter Leonard James Roe, C/KX88255.
- Temporary Acting Stoker Petty Officer Joseph Wright, D/KX91443.
- Engineroom Mechanic 4th class Ronald Edward Isherwood, D/MX103120.
- Engineroom Mechanic 4th class Leonard Frederick Milsted, P/MX98066.
- Petty Officer Motor Mechanic Valentine John Robbins, C/MX126332.
- Ordnance Mechanic 4th Class John Reeve French, C/MX704817.
- Petty Officer Radio Mechanic Glyndwr Chivers, P/MX116984.
- Temporary Petty Officer Radio Mechanic Eric Thomas Henry Fitzsimmons, P/MX636255.
- Petty Officer Radio Mechanic Charles Joseph Giardelli, P/MX636257.
- Petty Officer Radio Mechanic Arthur Terence Smith, P/MX117219.
- Shipwright 4th Class Malharao Johori, RIN, 7692.
- Engineman Thomas Dunk, LT/KX110528, RNPS.
- Engineman Charles Herbert, LT/DX5993 E.S, RNR.
- Engineman Ernest George Meek, LT/KX115168.
- Engineman James Stevenson Rodger, LT/KX103188
- Engineman John Rea Sutherland, LT/X6055 E.S.
- Engineman Samuel Williams, LT/KX115127.
- Engineman James Wood, LT/KX115477.
- Plumber Henry Willans, NAP/R.580012.
- Stores Petty Officer James Alfred Houghton, P/S/MX381.
- Temporary Petty Officer Cook Alfred George Lane, S.17830, RAN.
- Temporary Petty Officer Cook (S) Edward James Peterson, P/MX48952.
- Temporary Petty Officer Cook (S) Frederick Arthur Richards, D/MX51408.
- Petty Officer Cook (O) Kenneth Robinson, C/MX71158.
- Temporary Petty Officer Cook (S) Leslie Frank Sage, C/MX82241.
- Petty Officer Cook (S) Thomas Edgar Stallard, D/MX51693.
- Petty Officer Steward Percival James Aris, D/L.15175.
- Sergeant (Temporary) Charles Duncan Calder, Ply.X2053/45, Royal Marines.
- Sergeant Cyril George Houghton, Po.X22586, Royal Marines.
- Donkeyman George Patnell, NAP/R.1109541.
- Donkeyman George William Smith, NAP/R.42262.
- Donkeyman Frederick Thomas Taylor, NAP/R.84726.
- Flight Sergeant Arthur James Brett, 364794, Royal Air Force.
- Leading Seaman James Henry Burr, D/JX204193.
- Leading Seaman William Alfred Corby, P/J104755.
- Leading Seaman Alexander McLellan Coull, LT/X19955A.
- Leading Seaman John Henry Flounders, LT/JX183279.
- Leading Seaman Arthur Johnson, LT/JX299406.
- Leading Seaman John Kilby, D/SSX23395.
- Leading Seaman Duncan McDonald, LT/JX210684.
- Leading Seaman Cyril Vincent Middleton, LT/X21555A.
- Leading Seaman Ronald Kitchener Murphy, LT/JX200813.
- Leading Seaman John Patrick Peter Robinson, D/MD/X2911.
- Leading Seaman Stanley James Walter Ryan, LT/JX301050.
- Leading Seaman Cyril Springall, LT/JX229426.
- Acting Leading Seaman Henry Charles Batten, D/JX190557.
- Temporary Acting Leading Seaman Bernard Byrne, D/SSX18272.
- Acting Leading Seaman Jack Dearden, P/JX262867.
- Temporary Leading Seaman Leslie Richard Jones, DSM, D/JX137296.
- Acting Leading Seaman John Middleton Lawrence, C/SSX14769.
- Temporary Acting Leading Seaman Harry Spoors, P/JX187665.
- Acting Leading Seaman Charles Taylor, D/JX220632.
- Temporary Leading Seaman (Radar) William Morgan, P/JX255730.
- Leading Seaman (Radar) Ronald Percival Morris, D/JX234166.
- Leading Wireman (M/S) Stanley Douglas Cornford, C/MX63573.
- Leading Wireman Ernest Fogg, C/MX77881.
- Leading Wireman William Whitford, C/MX77695.
- Temporary Acting Leading Signalman Thomas William Agar, P/JX214123.
- Acting Leading Signalman John Maskrey, D/JX245763.
- Leading Coder David Francis Jones, D/JX230453.
- Leading Stoker Leonard Thomas Barson, P/KX121860.
- Leading Stoker Ronald Joseph Parker, D/KX134876.
- Temporary Leading Stoker Frederic Joshua Cameron, D/KX97491.
- Temporary Acting Leading Stoker William Douglas, C/KX106371.
- Temporary Leading Stoker Alfred George Hann, D/KX113228.
- Temporary Leading Stoker Ernest Philip Munday, C/KX115674.
- Temporary Acting Leading Stoker John William O'Reilly, P/KX150362.
- Blacksmith 4th Class Reginald Sidney Tomlinson, P/MX124609.
- Sailmaker's Mate Roy William Frank Staplehurst, P/JX160128.
- Leading Writer William Hansel Rowden, P/MX80045.
- Leading Writer Alfred William Tiffin, C/MX671662.
- Temporary Leading Writer George Middleton Chere, C/MX700629.
- Temporary Leading Writer Donald Senior, P/MX671656.
- Leading Supply Assistant Robert Jenkins, D/MX571463.
- Greaser James Joseph Clare, NAP/R.13017.
- Greaser Thomas Alfred Dixon, NAP/R.159163.
- Leading Cook Frederick Alloway, LT/MX105796.
- Leading Cook Frank Buckle, LT/MX85443.
- Leading Cook (S) James Robert Dalton, P/MX67917.
- Leading Cook Philip Henry Davies, LT/MX94748.
- Leading Cook Kenneth William Fairchild, LT/MX86238.
- Leading Cook (O) William John Haggas, P/LX22777.
- Temporary Leading Cook (S) Robert Hamilton, P/MX81852.
- Able Seaman Thomas Bridges, P/JX273445.
- Able Seaman Arthur John Brocks, P/J15764.
- Able Seaman Denis Patrick Hogan, D/JX176667.
- Able Seaman Ronald James Lock, D/JX557721.
- Able Seaman Edmund Moon, D/JX133756.
- Able Seaman Cyril Sydney Shea, P/JX289800.
- Able Seaman Wilfrid Herbert Sparkes, D/J109592.
- Able Seaman Peter Lawson Stirrat, D/JX638016.
- Able Seaman James Strachan, P/JX323976.
- Able Seaman Thomas Ward, D/JX568305.
- Able Seaman Frederick Enoch Welch, C/J102742.
- Acting Able Seaman John Rae Shaw, D/JX563249.
- Acting Able Seaman Leslie James Stainer, C/JX377843.
- Naval Airman 1st Class Paul Bryan Extan Hann, F.A.A, FX668990.
- Signalman Edward Francis McNerney, LT/JX405030.
- Signalman Cyril John Rogers, LT/JX324990.
- Telegraphist Douglas Anderson, LT/JX179260.
- Telegraphist Ronald Barnett, LT/JX 677011.
- Telegraphist Reginald Vernon Jackson, LT/JX386760.
- Telegraphist Anthony Harry Barclay Lamb, LT/JX344006.
- Telegraohist William Lunn, C/JX262933.
- Telegraphist Edward Moffat, LT/JX226299.
- Coder Eric Graham, D/JX508391.
- Air Fitter John James Murphy, FAA/FX87302.
- Stoker David George Atkins, LT/KX142085.
- Stoker 1st Class Joseph Charles Barclay, P/KX140014.
- Stoker Trevor Cuthbert, 562338, SANF.
- Stoker 1st Class Harry John French, P/KX142775.
- Stoker 1st Class John Harris, D/KX146946.
- Stoker 1st Class Gerald Montford, P/KX600793.
- Stoker 1st Class Francis John Pulford, D/KX121943.
- Stoker Thomas George Quinn, LT/KX115016.
- Stoker 1st Class Patrick Rainey, D/KX153920.
- Stoker William Rudd, LT/KX157119.
- Stoker 1st Class John George Russell, P/KX120448.
- Stoker Harold Joseph Taya, Burma 770.
- Stoker 1st Class Ernest Williams, LT/KX532366.
- Ordinary Signalman John Henry Rattigan, LT/KX342181.
- Writer Ronald Leslie Smith, P/MX708506.
- Marine Eric Jones, Po.X3461 Royal Marines.
- Seaman Gunner Eric Jackson, LT/JX299790.
- Seaman George Malcolm Armstrong, LT/JX243048.
- Seaman John Bpuch Bunn, LT/JX387705.
- Seaman Vincent Cordukes, LT/JX243089.
- Seaman Robert Sim Gunn, LT/JX200597.
- Seaman Leslie Alfred Hanney, LT/JX317132.
- Seaman Francis William George Keast, D/X9789, RNR.
- Seaman George Philip Littley, LT/JX220770.
- Seaman Jack Mitchell Lynn, LT/JX185322.
- Seaman Alexander Moore McPherson, LT/JX400017.
- Seaman Murdo Macdonald, LT/JX281918.
- Seaman John Edward Steven Muggridge, LT/JX180289.
- Seaman Angus Murray, LT/JX400554.
- Seaman William Cunnington Renger, LT/JX246947.
- Seaman William John Smith, LT/JX183600.
- Seaman Alexander Stanley, LT/JX258645.
- Seaman William Aaron Wilkinson, LT/KX200592.
- Seaman Donald Wrangles, LT/JX228726.
- Steward Roy King, D/LX571256.
- Musician Robert James Connelly, R.M.B.X1539.

=== Royal Red Cross (RRC) ===
Royal Navy

- Olga Heather Franklin, ARRC, Senior Sister, Queen Alexandra's Royal Naval Nursing Service.
- Eva Doris Bishop, ARRC, Acting Principal Matron, Queen Alexandra's Royal Naval Nursing Service.
- Margaret Frances Maxwell Trimble, ARRC, Acting Matron, Queen Alexandra's Royal Naval Nursing Service.
- Gertrude Annie Ramsden, ARRC, Acting Senior Sister (R), Queen Alexandra's Royal Naval Nursing Service.

Army

- Nellie Winifred Adcock, Sister (Acting Principal Matron) (209686), Territorial Army Nursing Service.
- Margaret Caroline Bearcroft, ARRC, Matron (NZ.12542), Indian Military Nursing Service.
- Catherine Cunningham Fleming, ARRC, Sister (Acting Principal Matron) (213257), Territorial Army Nursing Service.
- Florence Mary Gurton, ARRC, Matron (Acting Principal. Matron) (206164), Queen Alexandra's Imperial Military Nursing Service.
- Elizabeth Mary Hall, Sister (Acting Principal Matron) (206203), Queen Alexandra's Imperial Military Nursing Service.
- Mary Adelaide Harris, Sister (213416), Territorial Army Nursing Service.
- Mary Hobbs, Senior Sister (206183), Queen Alexandra's Imperial Military Nursing Service.
- Sarah Ethel Hughes, Temporary Matron (Acting Principal Matron) (206210), Queen Alexandra's Imperial Military Nursing Service.
- Jane Reagh, Sister (Temporary Matron) (206408), Queen Alexandra's Imperial Military Nursing Service.
- Violet Rees, Matron (NZ.4410), Indian Military Nursing Service.
- Gertrude Mary Saddler, Matron (244268), Queen Alexandra's Imperial Military Nursing Service Reserve.
- Dinah Taylor Waters, Sister (Acting Principal Matron) (215689), Territorial Army Nursing Service.
- Julia Whitehead, Matron (Acting Principal Matron) (206518), Queen Alexandra's Imperial Military Nursing Service.

Royal Air Force

- Acting Matron Olive Amy Keyse (5038), ARRC, Princess Mary's Royal Air Force Nursing Service.
- Acting Matron Rosina Emma Caroline Polus (5023), ARRC, Princess Mary's Royal Air Force Nursing Service.
- Matron Ethel Maude Elder (4321), Royal Canadian Air Force Nursing Service.

Bar to Royal Red Cross

- Kathleen Baker, RRC, Acting Principal Matron, Queen Alexandra's Royal Naval Nursing Service.
- Anne Dolan, RRC, Principal Matron (213231), Territorial Army Nursing Service.
- Bessie Jones, RRC, Matron (Acting Chief Principal Matron) (266239), Queen Alexandra's Imperial Military Nursing Service.
- Gertrude Elizabeth Morgan, RRC, Matron (Acting Principal Matron) (206295), Queen Alexandra's Imperial Military Nursing Service.
- Phyllis Marjorie Dart Sowter, OBE, RRC, Principal Matron (Acting Chief Principal Matron) (206462), Queen Alexandra's Imperial Military Nursing Service.

==== Associate of the Royal Red Cross (ARRC) ====
Royal Navy

- Doris Ethel Johnston, Acting Matron, QARNNS.
- Norah Kathleen Westaway, Acting Matron, QARNNS.
- Mary Kennedy, Acting Matron, QARNNS.
- Iris Amy Lilian Rollin, Nursing Sister, QARNNS.
- Mary Elizabeth Jane Maguire, Acting Matron, QARNNS.
- Gwynydd Marjorie Griffiths, Nursing Sister, QARNNS.
- Ellen Hally, Nursing Sister (R), QARNNS.
- Emily Elizabeth Christian, Acting Matron (R), QARNNS.
- Muriel Annie Bentley, Acting Matron (R), QARNNS.
- Constance Mary Leedham, Acting Senior Sister (R), QARNNS.
- Lilian Grace Mary Lewery, Nursing Sister (R), QARNNS.
- Winifred Mary Tipper, Acting Senior Sister (R), QARNNS.
- Kathleen Doris de Sales Turland, Acting Senior Sister (R), QARNNS.
- Hannah Embleton Kyle Walker, Nursing Sister (R), QARNNS.
- Marjorie Adore Stores White-Atkins, Acting Matron, QARNNS.
- Florence Wroe, Nursing Sister, QARNNS.
- Helen Barbara Harland, VAD Commandant.
- Kathleen Douglas Adam, VAD Commandant.
- Barbara Gordon Beazley, VAD Commandant.
- Violet Audrey Pope, VAD Nursing Member.
- Sarah Ellen Longworth, VAD Nursing Member.
- Winifred Ada Clark, VAD Nursing Member (Supervising).
- Eileen Gwynne Hayter, VAD Nursing Member.
- Frances Lisa Lewis, VAD Nursing Member (Head).
- Muriel Mary Pownall, VAD Nursing Member (Senior).
- Lorraine Dowding, VAD Nursing Member (Senior).
- Freda Simons, VAD Nursing Member (Senior).
- Desiree Dorothy Bailey, VAD Nursing Member (Senior).
- Lesley Winifred Fox, VAD Nursing Member.
- Ivy Gertrude Hills, Civilian Nurse.

Army

- Isabella Forest Anderson, Sister (Acting Senior Sister) (209722), Territorial Army Nursing Service.
- Gwendoline Mary Bates, Sister (206634), Queen Alexandra's Imperial Military Nursing Service Reserve.
- Rita Mary Beacock, Sister (Acting Matron) (209808), Territorial Army Nursing Service.
- Constance Mabel Bokenham, Senior Sister (Acting Principal Matron) (206060), Queen Alexandra's Imperial Military Nursing Service.
- Ella Agnes Carr, Sister (215795), Queen Alexandra's Imperial Military Nursing Service Reserve.
- Cathleen Mary Carroll, Senior Sister (209953), Territorial Army Nursing Service.
- Dorothy Fairer Egertqn, Sister (213171), Territorial Army Nursing Service.
- Frances Evelyn Ellis, Sister (213163), Territorial Army Nursing Service.
- Eleanor Myfanwy Evans, Sister (208029), Queen Alexandra's Imperial Military Nursing Service Reserve.
- Pauline Catherine Gannon, Sister (Acting Senior Sister) (223379), Territorial Army Nursing Service.
- Winifred Enid Gardiner, Sister (Acting Matron) (N.12482), Indian Military Nursing Service.
- Mary Caster, Sister (231415), Queen Alexandra's Imperial Military Nursing Service Reserve.
- Grace Maud Goodfellow, Sister (215973), Queen Alexandra's Imperial Military Nursing Service Reserve.
- Kathleen Gladys Griffiths, Sister (208235), Queen Alexandra's Imperial Military Nursing Service Reserve.
- Nancy Darling Hammer, Sister (Acting Matron) (213412), Territorial Army Nursing Service.
- Doris Hanney, Sister (Acting Matron) (206206), Queen Alexandra's Imperial Military Nursing Service.
- Alice Margaret Hey, Sister (206220), Queen Alexandra's Imperial Military Nursing Service.
- Edith Hodges, Sister (Acting Senior Sister) (227174), Queen Alexandra's Imperial Military Nursing Service Reserve.
- Grace Margaret Hogg, Senior Sister (208452), Queen Alexandra's Imperial Military Nursing Service Reserve.
- Muriel Hutchen, Sister (213460), Territorial Army Nursing Service.
- Catherine Isabella Johnson, Senior Sister (Acting Matron) (213662), Territorial Army Nursing Service.
- May Leigh, Sister (213754), Territorial Army Nursing Service.
- Kathleens/Margaret Maloney, Sister (225691), Queen Alexandra's Imperial Military Nursing Service Reserve.
- Catherine Phoebe Maudsley, Sister, (Acting Matron) (213988), Territorial Army Nursing Service.
- Betty Josephine Medworth, Sister (213406), Queen Alexandra's Imperial Military Nursing Service Reserve.
- W/7161190 Warrant Officer Class I Denise Currie Spencer Milligan, Voluntary Aid Detachment.
- Agnes Campbell McLachlan, Sister (208762), Queen Alexandra's Imperial Military Nursing Service Reserve.
- Enid Margaret Morgan, Sister (215080), Territorial Army Nursing Service.
- Mary Murphy, Sister (218954), Queen Alexandra's Imperial Military Nursing Service Reserve.
- Jessie Victoria Murray, Sister (Acting Matron) (215084), Territorial Army Nursing Service.
- Kathleen Nutter, Sister (215020), Territorial Army Nursing Service.
- Edith Fegg, Sister (215389), Queen Alexandra's Imperial Military Nursing Service Reserve.
- Margaret Lowe Pye, Sister (Acting Senior Sister) (215171), Territorial Army Nursing Service.
- Harriet Foache, Sister (209123), Queen Alexandra's Imperial Military Nursing Service Reserve.
- Flora MacDonald Ross, Sister (Acting Senior Sister) (209094), Queen Alexandra's Imperial Military Nursing Service Reserve.
- Jessie Snaith Brown, Sister (209916), Territorial Army Nursing Service.
- Gisfa Idina Sumpter, Sister (Acting Matron) (206457), Queen Alexandra's Imperial Military Nursing Service.
- Elizabeth Cawley Talbot, Senior Sister (Acting Matron) (215642), Territorial Army Nursing Service.
- Mary Louisa Thompson, Sister (215578), Territorial Army Nursing Service.
- Angelina Flora Tomlin, Sister (209362), Queen Alexandra's Imperial Military Nursing Service Reserve.
- Kathleen Muriel Wade, Sister (215720), Territorial Army Nursing Service.
- Alice Mary Woods, Sister (209475), Queen Alexandra's Imperial Military Nursing Service Reserve.

Royal Air Force (Princess Mary's Royal Air Force Nursing Service)

Acting Matrons

- Phyllis Garrard (5060).
- Emily Martha Marfleet (5053).
- Acting Senior Sisters.
- Rona Charteris Black (5604).
- Mary Patricia Dawson (5417).
- Helen Nicholas Brait Grierson (5064).
- Dorothy Hughes (5451).
- Elizabeth Jordan (5158).

Sisters

- Margaret Hannah Banks (5958).
- Kathleen Sarah Bentley (5589).
- Nancy Arabella Braithwaite (5486).
- Jessie Brown (5525).
- Sylvia Lee Cover (5590).
- Johanna Dore (5797).
- Margaret Isabel Fowke (5500).
- Margret Rogers Hamilton (5245).
- Patricia Muriel Halahan (5250).
- Julia Kenley (6086).
- Barbara Sybil Mary Macdonald (5668).
- Margaret Marshall McHardy (6038).
- Margaret Rhead Sandford (5663).
- Lois Heather Barbara Spooner (6070).
- Jessie Ada Wright (5183).

=== Air Force Cross (AFC) ===
Royal Air Force

Wing Commanders

- James Rintoul Cellars, MB, ChB, (23309).
- Harold Frederick Cox (33183).
- John Harvey Heyworth (32079).

Acting Wing Commanders

- Harold Arthur Cooper Bird-Wilson, DSO, DFC, (40335), RAFO.
- Christopher Brathwaite Gavin-Robinson (39128), RAFO.
- Wilfrid Shearman (40856), RAFO.

Squadron Leaders

- David Murray Alexander (131864), RAFVR.
- Maurice Peter Brown (40796).
- John Phillip Gladstone Harris (43971).
- Maxwell Hamilton James (41424), RAFO.
- Stephen Nicholas Johnson (40228), RAFO.
- William Wallace McRae (118567), RAFVR.
- Albert Walton Roland Perry (40841), RAFO.
- Richard Keith Potter (81364), RAFVR.
- David James Rose (41069), RAFO.
- Douglas Edward John Saint (82713), RAFVR.
- Cyril Charles Douglas Williams (24003), RAFO.
- Francis James Lyle Wyatt (134493), RAFVR.

Acting Squadron Leaders

- David Malcolm Anderson (60302), RAFVR.
- Edward Bailey (44545).
- Eric Vernon Best (36236), RAFO.
- Frank Michael Biddulph (43056.).
- Michael George Birt, DFC, (41368), RAFO.
- Thomas Sidley Blyth, DFC, (126153), RAFVR.
- Cyril Bob Brown (109525), RAFVR.
- Francis Herbert Butcher (70795), RAFO.
- Alan Cholmondeley (113869), RAFVR.
- John Howard Carr Clark, DFC, (106105), RAFVR.
- Derrick Harry Clarke, DFC, (40512), RAFO.
- George Alexander Craig, DFM, (47605).
- Derrick John D'Alton, DFC, (77206), RAFVR.
- William Arthur Downes, DFC, (46770).
- Herbert Walter Edwards (45372).
- Ronald Vernon Ellis (47416).
- Frederick Ellison (49660).
- Geoffrey Herbert Godwin (139015), RAFVR.
- Laurence Gibson Holmes, DFC, (137194), RAFVR.
- Douglas Newcombe Hookway (82691), RAFVR.
- Lester Francis Humphrey, AFM, (43470).
- John Arthur Jarvis, DFC, (43472).
- Reginald John Jones (44871).
- William Jones (44635).
- George Charles McCarthy (134006), RAFVR.
- John Douglas Mallinson (42513), RAFO.
- Eric Walter Partridge (89300), RAFVR.
- Edward Ernest Pratt (116486), RAFVR.
- Cecil Joseph Rose, A.F.M. (45538), RAFVR.
- Albert Edward Rumble (44708).
- Douglas George Johnston Smith (121379), RAFVR.
- Cyril Norfolk Spurdens, DFC, (142210), RAFVR.
- Thomas Stevenson (82957), RAFVR.
- Simon John Thomas (119074), RAFVR.
- Richard William Frederick Wightman (79165), RAFVR.

Flight Lieutenants

- Norman Thomas Atkinson (141471), RAFVR.
- Robert Atkinson, DFC, (148110), RAFVR.
- Albert Hermann Battersby (129221), RAFVR.
- John Edward Bellingham (77776), RAFVR.
- William Henry Bent (145787), RAFVR.
- Christopher Frederick Bland (126009), RAFVR.
- George Bliss (70070), RAFO.
- Eric Brooks (136924), RAFVR.
- Ronald Frederick Bumstead (53138).
- Robert Burr, DFC, (127536), RAFVR.
- Wilfred Butler (130458), RAFVR.
- Albert Stewart Carswell (89368), RAFVR.
- Douglas James Chipping (67603), RAFVR.
- John Hall Clark (133480), RAFVR.
- Montague Robert Barclay Clift (141127), RAFVR.
- John Bernard Collins (125490). RAFVR.
- Frederick Ronald Davy, DFC, (66557), RAFVR.
- Harold John Dee (122467), RAFVR.
- David Bernard Delany (63472), RAFVR.
- Eric William Childs Dixon (122400), RAFVR.
- Bransby Richard Dodd (80239), RAFVR.
- James Eccleston (144381), RAFVR.
- Ernest Ellison, DFM, (52560).
- Alfred Eltringham (121077), RAFVR.
- Frank Emmett (127809), RAFVR.
- William Henry Etherton, DFC, (147212), RAFVR.
- Thomas Nelson Fiske (125725), RAFVR.
- Henry Vaughan Flint (157293), RAFVR.
- Charles Edward Fothergill (145475), RAFVR.
- Samuel Isidore Freedman (141087), RAFVR.
- Archibald Andrew Frew (116090), RAFVR.
- Frank Glen (142567), RAFVR.
- Robin Goodfellow (67708), RAFVR.
- Francis Jones Gosling, DFC, (108166), RAFVR.
- Christopher Kaye McAuley Gracie (145668), RAFVR.
- Fred Battersby Green (122440), RAFVR.
- Gordon Douglas Green, DFC, (83723), RAFVR.
- Albert George Louis Guernier (132598), RAFVR.
- John Hind Hamer (135736), RAFVR.
- James Edgar Harper (47656).
- James Barrett Harrop (121909), RAFVR.
- Peter Sidney Hawke (126862), RAFVR.
- Cyril Horatio Hawkins, DFC, (111681), RAFVR.
- Robert Henry Hebbourn (48991).
- John Stuart Hemmings (111469), RAFVR.
- Joihn Samuel Hitchcock, DFC, (106813), RAFVR.
- Walter Edward Holland (79152), RAFVR.
- Beresford Peter Torrington Horsley (61462), RAFVR.
- Joseph Lambert Howie (126861), RAFVR.
- Charles Alexander Lyall Hurry (48324).
- Royce Jarvis (48550).
- Eric Herbert Jones (82952), RAFVR.
- Eric Francis Kerbey (146395), RAFVR.
- Robin Herbert Knights, DFC, (47835).
- Norman Sidney Lacey (72997), RAFVR.
- William Arthur Land (128561), RAFVR.
- Alan Lawrence Law, DFC, (44777).
- Robert George Leach (146017), RAFVR.
- Stanley William Lee, DFM, (142836), RAFVR.
- John Leigh-Pemberton (111782), RAFVR.
- Norman Lightowler (136700), RAFVR.
- James McGill, DFC, (64899), RAFVR.
- Patrick Anthony McGrath (52069).
- Gordon Owen McGregor, DFM, (142212), RAFVR.
- Henry Patrick Bradshaw Mack (111957), RAFVR.
- Walter McRobbie (83278), RAFVR.
- John Kilpatrick Mann (113400), RAFVR.
- Trevor John Martin (137277), RAFVR.
- Derek Mason (149627), RAFVR.
- Arthur Henry George Melhuish (1690.62), RAFVR.
- Henry James Merchant (108856), RAFVR.
- Clarence Moore (126687), RAFVR.
- Alfred James Morgan, AFM, (46334).
- Oswald Norman Morris, DFC, (137442), RAFVR.
- Arthur Edward Cyril Oakshott (51505).
- John O'Leary, DFC, (158033), RAFVR.
- Lewis Parkes (115432), RAFVR.
- Harold Frederick Payne (46171).
- Theodore Ivan Petersen, DFC, (113495), RAFVR.
- James Pickering (117397), RAFVR.
- Thomas Colville Pinkerton (133365), RAFVR.
- Arthur Herbert Dorrien Pond (51485).
- Richard Vere Potts (128004), RAFVR.
- George Powell-Harper (89566), RAFVR.
- Robert Michael Pugh (42883), RAFO.
- Pothery Charuvary Ramachandran (66530), RAFVR.
- John Charles Nicol Reid (118047), RAFVR.
- William Charles Richardson, DFC, (137203), RAFVR.
- Alfred Victor Ricketts (161732), RAFVR.
- Archibald Fothergill Rowland (88414), RAFVR.
- George Henry Russell-Fry, DFC, (133047), RAFVR.
- Donald Bryan Searle (111121), RAFVR.
- Kenneth James Hyde Seymour (169899), RAFVR.
- Thomas Ferdinand Sibson (111094), RAFVR.
- William Cameron Sinclair (49242).
- Robert Keith Somerville (158718), RAFVR.
- Cecil Raymond Spencer, DFM, (146898), RAFVR.
- John. Stewart (152418), RAFVR.
- Ian Sargenson Stockwell, DFC, (132080), RAFVR.
- Walter Leonard Howard Thring (83189), RAFVR.
- Herbert William Waylen, AFM, (43181).
- Claude Edward White (174522), RAFVR.
- Charles Douglas Wiggin, DFC, (125852), RAFVR.
- Charles Thurgon Williams (126105), RAFVR.
- Harry Woolhouse (145677), RAFVR.
- Stanley Woollock (100094), RAFVR.
- Frederick James Wright, DFC, (127891), RAFVR.
- John Wright, DFC, (81929), RAFVR.
- Joseph Charles Wright (147899), RAFVR.
- Leslie Albert Cyril Wright (124705), RAFVR.

Acting Flight Lieutenants

- Frank McKellar (161531), RAFVR.
- Graham Arthur Steadman (169596), RAFVR.

Flying Officers

- James Arthur (174415), RAFVR.
- Dennis Edward James Battle (172720), RAFVR.
- Raymond Albert Branson (179792), RAFVR.
- Ronald Hubert Ceha (177313), RAFVR.
- Eric Albert William Clarkson (140227), RAFVR.
- Forbes John Fraser (182721), RAFVR.
- Deiyck Westley Groocock (175668), RAFVR.
- Samuel Airlie Holden-Hindley (150491), RAFVR.
- Arthur Ashton Leake (173367), RAFVR.
- Arthur Keeton Marshall (54440), RAF.
- Douglas William Moore (161403), RAFVR.
- Brian Herbert Noble (163051), RAFVR.
- Maurice John Peskett (173052), RAFVR.
- Alan Roy Pitcher (177021), RAFVR.
- Bernard Frank Steel, DFC, (174798), RAFVR.
- John Strain, DFC, (188185), RAFVR.
- Maurice Alexander Whipp (185005), RAFVR.

Pilot Officers

- William Henry Griffiths, BEM, (198035), RAFVR.
- Geoffrey Martin Redmond (197575), RAFVR.

Warrant Officers

- Jack Emile Alazrachi (1439231), RAFVR.
- Denis Beilby (1623975), RAFVR.
- Alfred Frank Belson (1604650), RAFVR.
- Kenneth Charles Brett (903491), RAFVR.
- Roy Humphrey Brooks (1211644), RAFVR.
- David Thomas Charlesworth (119993), RAFVR.
- George James Coe (1281141), RAFVR.
- Reuben James Lock (748445), RAFVR.
- James MacDonald (1390114), RAFVR.
- William Middlemiss (970668), RAFVR.

Royal Naval Volunteer Reserve

- Lieutenant (A) Noel Courtney Langdon.

Royal Australian Air Force

Acting Wing Commander

- Donald Roy Donaldson (Aus.400631).

Squadron Leader

- Robert George Mullins (Aus.404799).
- Ernest John Woosley (Aus.404127).

Acting Squadron Leaders

- Frank Cook (Aus.261388).
- Philip Bruce Sinnott (Aus.250837).

Flight Lieutenant

- John Edwin Bartholomew (Aus.405996).
- Walter Edward Victor Boud (Aus.400199).
- Leonard Campbell Glenwright (Aus.403331)

Flying Officers

- Colin Campbell Gilmour (Aus.409203).
- Kenneth Sydney Trollope (Aus.410183).

Royal Canadian Air Force

Squadron Leader

- Francis Henry Pearce (Can./C.1589).

Flight Lieutenants

- Edwin Paul Beverley (Can./J.22459).
- Mare Fernand Brunelle (Can./J.14821).
- Joseph Robert Curtis (Can./J.16520).
- James Kenneth Easson (Can./J.17551).
- Walter Merrill Haig English, DFC, (Can./C.23861).
- Donald Stewart MacNeil (Can./J.25133).
- Jack Albert James Murray (Can./J.12471).
- Alexander Camille Wanlin (Can./C.46535).

Royal New Zealand Air Force

Flight Lieutenant

- Henry Drury Alcock (NZ.403298).
- William Paul Neville Clarke (NZ.415292).
- Athol Larry McGrath, DFC, (NZ.415337).

Warrant Officer

- Joseph Richard Turvey, DFM, (NZ.39343).

Royal South African Air Force

Acting Major

- Brian Bernard Melville, DCM, (20298V).

Captains

- Mungo Scott Bryson (102814V).
- Walter John Townshend-Smith (203008V).

==== Bar to Air Force Cross ====
Royal Air Force

- Wing Commander Oswald Victor Holmes, AFC, (77969), RAFVR.
- Acting Wing Commander Roland John Falk, AFC, (77978), RAFVR.
- Squadron Leader Patrick Vaughan Williams, AFC, (19177), RAFO.
- Flight Lieutenant William Spencer Jenkins, AFC, (45650).

=== Air Force Medal (AFM) ===
Royal Air Force

Flight Sergeants

- 51520967 James Dickie Hamilton, RAFVR.
- 1580043 Marshall Knealle Leary, RAFVR.
- 1580601 Percival James Pinnock, RAFVR.
- 1397532 Martin Stephen White, RAFVR.
- 1870237 William Brotherton Young, RAFVR.

Sergeant

- 1436481 Douglas Henry Evans, RAFVR.

Corporals

- 1342083 Alexander Binnie, RAFVR.
- 909735 Albert Edward Anson Kibble, RAFVR.
- 1290958 Henry Gerald Packwood, RAFVR.

South African Air Force

Acting Sergeant

- P.6999V Vincent Vardella Hastings.

Acting Corporal

- 142800V Sidney Eric Griffiths.

=== King's Commendation for Valuable Service in the Air ===
United Kingdom

- Frances Irving Arnaud, Radio Officer, No. 45 Group, Transport Command, RAF.
- John Ross Burton, Radio Officer, No. 45 Group, Transport Command, RAF.
- First Officer Victoria Cholmondeley, Ferry Pilot, Air Transport Auxiliary.
- Flight Captain Frederick Robert Davy, Ferry Pilot, No. 16 Ferry Pool, Air Transport Auxiliary.
- Flight Captain George Edward Dutton, Ferry Pilot, Air Transport Auxiliary.
- Adolphus Louis Evans, Radio Officer, No. 45 Group, Transport Command, RAF.
- First Officer Norman Brock Ewing, Ferry Pilot, No. 6 Ferry Pool, Air Transport Auxiliary.
- Alexander Fenwick, Radio Officer, No. 45 Group, Transport Command, RAF.
- Flight Captain Ian Stewart Fossett, Ferry Pilot, Air Transport Auxiliary.
- Captain Edwin Mackenzie Gurney, Senior Captain, British Overseas Airways Corporation.
- Flight Captain Arthur Cecil Irwin, Ferry Pilot, Air Transport Auxiliary.
- Flight Captain Ralph Jagger, Ferry Pilot, No. 7 Ferry Pool, Air Transport Auxiliary.
- Arthur Leonard McMann, Radio Officer, No. 45 Group, Transport Command, RAF.
- Flight Captain John Erwin Martens, Ferry Pilot, No. 6 Ferry Pool, Air Transport Auxiliary.
- Flight Captain Elizabeth Frances May, Ferry Pilot, No. 1 Ferry Pool, Air Transport Auxiliary.
- Flight Captain Francis Andrew Weir Mickel, Flying Boat Pilot, No. 4 Ferry Pool, Air Transport Auxiliary.
- First Officer Dolores Theresa Moggridge, Ferry Pilot, No. 15 Ferry Pool, Air Transport Auxiliary.
- Captain Robert Clive Parker, Senior Captain, British Overseas Airways Corporation.
- Captain Edward George Parsons, Second in Command, No. 3 Ferry Pool, Air Transport Auxiliary.
- First Officer Donald Edward Rae, Ferry Pilot, No. 4 Ferry Pool, Air Transport Auxiliary.
- Flight Captain Geoffrey Lewis Way Rider, Ferry Pilot, No. 16 Ferry Pool, Air Transport Auxiliary.
- First Officer Henry Clarence Stringer, Ferry Pilot, No. 1 Ferry Pool, Air Transport Auxiliary.
- James Stanley Tegart, Radio Officer, No. 45 Group, Transport Command, RAF.
- George Tutt, Radio Officer, No. 45 Group, Transport Command, RAF.
- Flight Captain Alfred Watson Vincent, Ferry Pilot, No. 6 Ferry Pool, Air Transport Auxiliary.
- First Officer Alexander Reginald Ward, Ferry Pilot, No. 4 Ferry Pool, Air Transport Auxiliary.
- Flight Captain Leslie Granville Warren, Ferry Pilot, Air Transport Auxiliary.

Royal Air Force
Squadron Leaders

- F. M. G. Scotter, DFC, (40853).
- C. M. Tuffley (114084), RAFVR.
- A. R. Turpin (70690), RAFO.
- J. D. Wood (70747), RAFO.

Acting Squadron Leaders

- F. W. Alder (42581).
- M. K. Gordon (118563), RAFVR.
- N. F. W. Hancock, DFC, (42122).
- F. J. Pidgeon (86435), RAFVR.

Flight Lieutenants

- S. A. G. Abbott (49658).
- H. H. Boddy (144287), RAFVR.
- N. Briggs (126070), RAFVR.
- W. B. Brown (147536), RAFVR.
- J. H. Cloete (81012), RAFVR.
- W. S. Close, DFC, (130721), RAFVR.
- G. E. Dickson, DFC, (51168).
- C. W. C. Farrow (85685), RAFVR.
- J. H. Gaston (122493), RAFVR.
- J. R. Haarhoff (80154), RAFVR.
- L. C. Hatt (78734), RAFVR.
- A. C. Heath (144791), RAFVR.
- J. H. Hicklin (102535), RAFVR.
- S. C. R. Hosgood (48640).
- J. C. Howdle (160644), RAFVR.
- A. R. Howell (52542).
- J. McM. Ireland (122500), RAFVR.
- E. L. Johnson (135003), RAFVR.
- S. J. Last (129252), RAFVR.
- W. E. J. Lunn (79369).
- D. H. Macbeath (73000), RAFVR.
- C. G. E. McIver (120731), RAFVR.
- J. Maxwell (125544), RAFVR.
- P. J. May (60919), RAFVR.
- J. R. S. Modera, DFC, (118474).
- T. B. Murray (90991), AAF.
- T. J. G. Neech (50886).
- B. W. Noble (171719), RAFVR.
- P. F. O'Keefe (46164).
- M. G. R. Osborn (141084), RAFVR.
- D. K. Parker (128987), RAFVR.
- C. L. J. Patten (122404), RAFVR.
- R. C. Price (137369), RAFVR.
- K. L. H. Ramsden (126866).
- J. R. Revill (157832), RAFVR.
- H. D. Richardson (60322).
- F. A. Robertshaw (141375), RAFVR.
- E. F. Rogers (125878), RAFVR.
- H. Sharples (136831), RAFVR.
- L. Sherwin (152334), RAFVR.
- N. F. Smith (132400), RAFVR.
- F. A. Spilsbury (135424), RAFVR.
- E. L. Syms (104587), RAFVR.
- C. H. T. Tubman, DFC, (142142), RAFVR.
- A. O. Twigg (125842), RAFVR.
- H. F. Vyse (155253), RAFVR.
- W. K. Watkins (120622), RAFVR.
- T. F. Wolstenholme (157073), RAFVR.
- G. Wood (146831), RAFVR.

Acting Flight Lieutenant

- C. W. Crawford, AFC, (56636).

Flying Officers

- E. S. Adey (163007), RAFVR.
- A. R. Appleton (54525).
- C. R. T. Bone (161680), RAFVR.
- E. Doyle (189055), RAFVR.
- E. S. Gray (177575), RAFVR.
- L. E. Keller (55415).
- M. W. Mantell (178276), RAFVR.
- B. H. G. Nation (56175).
- F. W. Sledmere (162087), RAFVR.
- J. W. Smith (195098), RAFVR.
- J. W. Tobias (162076), RAFVR.
- J. H. Wickson (173001), RAFVR.
- J. W. Wilkerson (190801), RAFVR.
- J. B. Wood (162024), RAFVR.

Pilot Officer

- J. Espie (175713), RAFVR.

Warrant Officers

- W. D. Bell (95559).
- F. G. Ford (1259118), RAFVR.
- R. J. Hillson (655410).
- S. W. A. Jones,(1386477), RAFVR.
- C. K. Slade (1189009), RAFVR.
- L. E. Spicer (915406), RAFVR.

Flight Sergeants

- 1622787 R. Boyce, RAFVR.
- 1586990 A. W. A. Ellis, RAFVR.
- 1623305 J. B. Noble, RAFVR.

Royal Australian Air Force
Acting Wing Commander

- E. M. Ball (Aus.280773).

Squadron Leader

- D. E. Moseley (Aus.250817).

Acting Squadron Leaders

- A. I. Barrett (Aus.252632).
- W. F. Boulden (Aus.292884).
- H. Wharf (Aus.405783).

Flight Lieutenants

- M. D. Delaney (Aus.15450).
- M. L. Everitt (Aus.405789).
- J. H. Gordon (Aus.402501).
- C. L. Karutz (Aus.283620).
- D. W. Leckie (Aus.250597).
- R. T. S. Pratt (Aus.401461).
- S. W. Russell (Aus.401670).
- J. F. Sullivan (Aus.405264).
- L. J. Webster (Aus.404123).

Royal Canadian Air Force
Squadron Leader

- D. A. Doherty (Can/J.7767).

Flight Lieutenant

- A. H. H. Waters (Can/J.10628).

Flying Officer

- W. I. Reid (Can/J.29050).

Royal New Zealand Air Force
Flight Lieutenant

- F. A. Cox (N.Z.415686).

South African Air Force
Captain

- R. E. Worroll (328869V).

=== King's Commendation for Brave Conduct ===
- Acting Squadron Leader D. B. Auchinvole (139779), RAFVR.
- Sergeant 972536 J. Hart, RAFVR.
- 1051683 Leading Aircraftman T. Livesey, RAFVR.
- Aus.124583 Leading Aircraftman W. S. Murray, RAAF.

=== King's Police and Fire Services Medal (KPFSM) ===
England & Wales

- Commander The Honourable Humphry Legge, DSO, Royal Navy, Chief Constable, Berkshire Constabulary.
- Charles Ernest Butler, Chief Constable, Great Grimsby Borough Police Force.
- Robert Cyril Morton Jenkins, Assistant Chief Constable, Kent Constabulary.
- Frank Osman, Assistant Chief Constable, Hampshire Joint Police Force.
- John Gibson Gargate, Chief Superintendent, County Palatine of Durham Constabulary.
- Arthur Stuart Pointing, Chief Superintendent, Somersetsnire, Constabulary.
- Ernest Atkinson, Superintendent, Bolton Borough Police Force.
- Walter Robert Wingfield, Inspector, Newcastle upon Tyne City Police Force.
- Albert Goodsall, Constable, Metropolitan Police Force.
- Charles Frederick Woodward, DCM, Inspector, Metropolitan Police Force.
- Ralph Sheldon, Superintendent, Metropolitan Police Force.
- Joseph William Richardson, Deputy Fire Force Commander, No. 10 (Lincoln) Fire Force.
- Edwin Richard Thomas Stanford, Fire Force Commander, No. 12 (Cambridge) Fire Force.
- Sidney William Barnes, GM, Deputy Fire Force Commander, No. 36 (London) Fire Force.
- George Herbert Robinson, Fire Force Commander, No. 30 (East Kent) Fire Force.
- Arthur Reginald James Leek, Deputy Fire Force Commander, No. 39 (Swindon) Fire Force.

Scotland

- William Black, OBE, Chief Constable, Dumfriesshire Constabulary.
- William Maclean, Chief Constable, Ross and Cromarty Constabulary.
- Andrew McMaster, Divisional Officer, Western (No. 1) Area.

Northern Ireland

- William Small, Head Constable, Royal Ulster Constabulary.

Australia

- Lillian May Armfield, Special Sergeant 1st Class, New South Wales Police Force.
- William Harvey Dudley, Superintendent 3rd Class, New South Wales Police Force.
- John Robert Johns, Superintendent, South Australian Police Force.
- Coleman Kain, Chief Traffic Inspector, South Australian Police Force.
- Francis Matthews, Superintendent 1st Class, New South Wales Police Force.
- Henry George McKenzie, Superintendent 3rd Class, New South Wales Police Force.
- Alexander McPherson, Chief Officer, Urban Fire Brigades, Melbourne, Victoria.
- Wright Sherringham, Superintendent 2nd Class, New South Wales Police Force.
- Norman Alexander Skinner, Superintendent, Hobart Fire Brigade, Tasmania.
- Thomas Wickham, Detective Superintendent 1st Class, New South Wales Police Force.
- John Thomas Willis, Superintendent 3rd Class, New South Wales Police Force.

India

- Sir Hugh Arbuthnot Inglis, Indian Police (Retd.), Inspector General of Police, United Provinces.
- Baleshwar Prashad, Indian Police, Superintendent of Police, Gaya, Bihar.
- Muhammad Rahmatullah Nawab Rahmat Yar Jung Bahadur, OBE, Commissioner of the Hyderabad City Police, His Exalted Highness the Nizam's Government, Hyderabad.

Colonies, Protectorates & Mandated Territories

- Stanhope Billyeald, Superintendent of Police, British Guiana.
- Gerald Hildebrand Farrell, Assistant Commissioner of Police, Nigeria.
- Arthur Frederick Giles, OBE, Assistant Inspector-General of Police, Palestine.
- Ronald Joseph Calender Broadhurst, Palestine Police. Seconded as Assistant Commandant in the Arab Legion, Trans-Jordan.
- Harold Anthony Shadforth, OBE, MC, Superintendent of Police, Palestine.
- Eric Methuen Vivian James, Superintendent of Police, Palestine.
- Patrick John Hackett, Superintendent of Police, Palestine.
- Radhi Annas, Quaimqam in the Arab Legion, Trans Jordan.
- Ivo Enrico Lucchinelli, Deputy Commissioner of Police, Fiji.
- Charles Eric Page, Deputy Commissioner of Police, Uganda.
- William Barry Bithrey, Commissioner of Police, Tanganyika.
- Captain Percy Eckel, Deputy Commissioner of Police, Gold Coast.
- Alfred William Riggs, MBE, Provincial Superintendent of Police, Kenya.

== See also ==
- 1946 New Year Honours (Canada)
- 1946 New Year Honours (South Africa)
- 1946 New Year Honours (New Zealand)
- 1946 New Year Honours (Mentioned in Dispatches)
