= 1946 New Year Honours (Mentioned in Dispatches) =

== Mentioned in despatches ==
=== Royal Air Force ===
Air Vice Marshals

- G. B. A. Baker, CB, CBE, MC.
- A. J. Capel, CB, DSO, DFC.
- T. W. Elmhirst, CB, CBE, AFC.
- F. H. Maynard, CB, AFC.
- A. P. M. Sanders, CB, CBE.
- Sir Robert H. M. S. Saundby, KBE, CB, MC, DFC, AFC.
- H. S. P. Walmsley, CB, CBE, MC, DFC.

Acting Air Vice Marshals

- Sir Harry Broadhurst, KBE, CB, DSO, AFC.
- Sir Basil E. Embry, KBE, CB, DSO, DFC, AFC.
- R. M. Foster, CB, CBE, DFC.
- V. E. Groom, CB, CBE, DFC.
- F. L. Hopps, CB, CBE, AFC.
- E. C. Hudleston, CB, CBE.
- K. B. Lloyd, CBE, AFC.
- H. V. Satterly, CBE, DFC.

Air Commodores

- N. H. D'Aeth, CBE.
- J. W. F. Merer.
- J. Silvester.
- A. M. Wray, DSO, MC, DFC, AFC.

Acting Air Commodores

- C. D. Adams, OBE.
- E. A. Burridge.
- L. W. Cannon, CBE.
- W. J. Crisham, CBE.
- W. D. Disbrey, CBE, AFC.
- Viscount A. P. H. Forbes, AFC, RAFVR.
- C. R. Lousada.
- F. B. Ludlow, CBE, MC.
- H. M. Pearson, CBE.
- M. K. D. Porter, CBE.
- H. F. G. Southey.

Group Captains

- T. J. Arbuthnot.
- E. S. Moulton-Barrett.
- G. Bearne.
- J. Bradbury, DFC.
- W. R. Brotherhood.
- E. J. P. Burling, DSC, DFC, AFC.
- H. W. Capener.
- J. G. Cardale.
- B. A. Casey, OBE
- W. S. Caster.
- D. D. Christie, AFC.
- L. W. Dickens, DFC, AFC.
- H. R. A. Edwards, DFC, AFC.
- R. H. E. Emson, AFC.
- V. S. Ewing.
- N. H. Fresson, DFC.
- R. H. Harris, RAFO.
- S. H. V. Harris.
- R. B. Harrison.
- J. P. Hitchings, CBE, AAF.
- J. Hornby.
- P. Jones.
- G. A. L. Manton.
- A. P. Morley, OBE, RAFVR.
- L. Martin, AFC.
- O. A. Morris, DSO.
- C. E. Morse.
- R. H. G. Neville, OBE, MC.
- D. N. Kington-Blair-Oliphant.
- K. F. T. Pickles.
- L. V. Spencer, OBE
- J. E. R. Sowman.
- D. L. Thomson, DSO, DFC.
- E. F. Turner, AFC.
- R. G. Warden, RAFVR.
- C. A. Watt.
- S. S. Wheeler, AAF.

Acting Group Captains

- C. Hanson-Abbott.
- The Hon. M. Aitken, DSO, DFC, MP, AAF.
- A. J. Banham, RAFO.
- R. E. Baxter, DFC.
- P. R. Beare, DSO, DFC, RAFO.
- F. H. Bell, RAFVR.
- E. R. Bitmead, DFC, RAFO.
- W. D. Blackwood, DFC.
- R. I. M. Bowen, DFC.
- L. G. Brown.
- H. E. Bufton, DSO, DFC, AFC.
- F. Carpenter.
- J. P. Cave.
- G. F. Chater, DFC.
- H. I. Clapperton, LDS, RAFO.
- D. H. Cross, RAFO.
- L. D. Dadswell.
- F. W. P. Dixon, MBE, MB, BS, DO(Oxon), FRCS(E).
- G. F. K. Donaldson, DFC, AFC.
- O. R. Donaldson, DSO, DFC, RAFO.
- R. I. K. Edwards, DFC, AFC.
- D. O. Finlay, DFC, AFC.
- J. S. French.
- R. T. F. Gates.
- R. T. Gething, OBE, AFC, RAFO.
- H. G. Goddard, DSO, DFC, AFC, RAFO.
- C. P. Green, DSO, DFC, AAF.
- J. Greenhalgh.
- T. L. E. B. Guinness, AAF.
- C. H. Hartley, DFC, AFC, RAFVR.
- W. P. Harvey.
- G. D. L. Haysom, DSO, DFC.
- R. Hiscox, OBE, AAF.
- B. R. O'B. Hoare, DSO, DFC, RAFO.
- G. F. Humphries, RAFO.
- J. G. B. Hutchings, OBE, RAFVR.
- P. G. Jameson, DSO, DFC, RAFO.
- D. S. Jillings, CBE, MC, RAFVR.
- M. T. Judd, DSO, DFC, AFC, RAFVR.
- D. D. G. Keddie.
- F. F. Kennedy.
- C. B. F. Kingcome, DSO, DFC.
- I. D. N. Lawson, DFC.
- F. E. Lipscomb.
- D. F. Macdonald.
- I. G. Mackay.
- J. J. McKay, DSO, DFC.
- W. D. Macpherson, OBE, RAFVR.
- D. P. Marvin, DFC, RAFO.
- J. N. Matson, RAFVR.
- S. L. Matthews.
- S. W. B. Menaul, DFC, AFC.
- V. R. Moon, AFC.
- T. F. D. Morgan, DSO, OBE, DFC, RAFO.
- N. E. Morrison, AFC.
- A. A. Newbury.
- H. C. S. Pimblett, MD, BS, DCOG.
- G. C. Pinkerton, OBE, DFC, AAF.
- H. P. Pleasance, OBE, DFC, RAFO.
- J. M. J. C. J. I. Rock de Besombes.
- F. E. Rosier, DSO, OBE
- C. J. Salmon, OBE
- G. F. L. Scott.
- D. C. Stapleton.
- R. C. Sutcliffe, OBE, RAFVR.
- C. D. Tomalin, DFC, AFC, RAFO.
- P. R. Walker, DSO, DFC, RAFO.
- The Hon. E. F. Ward, RAFO.
- E. L. Colbeck-Welch, DFC, RAFO.
- E. A. Whiteley, DFC.

Chaplains

- The Rev. C. E. W. Bellingham, RAFVR.
- The Rev. A. S, Berey, RAFVR.
- The Rev. P. J. Blake, RAFVR.
- The Rev. D. G. Brook, RAFVR.
- The Rev. J. W. Bullen, RAFVR.
- The Rev. M. M. Corner, RAFVR.
- The Rev. E. A. Ellis, RAFVR.
- The Rev. R. St. J. T. Groves, RAFVR.
- The Rev. J. C. Harkus, RAFVR.
- The Rev. J. Heaven, RAFVR.
- The Rev. A. Heyes, RAFVR.
- The Rev. J. Kerrigan, RAFVR.
- The Rev. A. G. MacIntyre, RAFVR.
- The Rev. S. W. E. Marlow, RAFVR.
- The Rev. J. E. Miller, RAFVR.
- The Rev. P. J. O'Connell.
- The Rev. D. K. Oldring, RAFVR.
- The Rev. W. E. G. Payton, RAFVR.
- The Rev. J. M. Scutt, RAFVR.
- The Rev. T. E. Warner, RAFVR.
- The Rev. R. S. Wilkie.

Wing Commanders

- R. H. Abrook, OBE, (43223).
- P. H. Alington, DFC, (37843), RAFO.
- W. P. Allan (114665), RAFVR.
- J. B. Altham (05216).
- E. G. Ambridge (31011).
- C. E. Aston (11104).
- J. C. Barclay (90046), AAF.
- P. J. Barnett (03128).
- C. J. C. Barritt (70045), RAFO.
- A. J. Beard, MC, (90503), AAF.
- R. L. Bell (35087).
- H. E. Bellringer, MB, ChB, (23264).
- J. C. Bevan (36040).
- F. H. Bickerton (74426), RAFVR.
- J. Black (85807), RAFVR.
- B. L. Blofeld (11176).
- J. Brooker (73568), RAFVR.
- H. J. Brown (03164).
- R. H. Budworth (73508), RAFVR.
- G. J. Bulman (72255), RAFVR.
- P. J. Cains (35357).
- T. C. Carter (72012.), RAFVR.
- H. G. Cattell, DFC, (43355).
- A. E. Clifton, OBE, (35060).
- G. A. B. Cooper (90396), AAF.
- N. M. Corcos (76062), RAFVR.
- R. T. Corry, OBE, (90034), AAF.
- H. V. Crowder (19212).
- R. B. Dashper (26156).
- R. A. G. Edwards (82393), RAFVR.
- G. H. D. Evans, DSO, DFC, (33309).
- R. E. W. Fisher, MB, BCh, (23140), RAFO.
- G. V. Forrest (109482), RAFVR.
- K. V. Garside, DFC, (36107).
- R. W. Gray (72234), RAFVR.
- P. R. S. Gutteridge (43218).
- F. M. Hall, (11232).
- G. H. Harris (75779), RAFVR.
- G. H. Harrison (35093)
- H. F. Harvey, MD, BS, DA, (23163).
- A. J. Haskell (35296).
- C. Herbert (35333).
- F. Hills (35267).
- J. E. Howell (90312), AAF.
- J. A. Hunter (40830), RAFO,
- I. C. Jackson, DFC, (33139),
- F. F. James (74143), RAFVR.
- G. R. A. M. Johnston (72082), RAFO.
- A. S. Kerr (35297).
- E. J. A. Knight (35027).
- F. G. Land (85686), RAFVR.
- H. H. Laurie, OBE, (35063)
- E. L. G. Le Dieu (21178).
- E. W. Long (35065).
- G. W. Lynn (11132).
- L. P. McCullagh (14227).
- F. N. McDowell (73754), RAFVR.
- J. C. McWatters (86655), RAFVR.
- C. V. Mears. (21187).
- D. Michell (33008).
- B. F. Moore (01210), RAFVR.
- L. Maxwell-Muller, OBE, (37233).
- M. W. Nolan, CBE, (08015).
- A. W. Oldroyd, DFC, AFC, (37889).
- H. J. Oughton (74194), RAFVR.
- A. J. V. Parish (35096).
- R. N. Riddell (70572), RAFO.
- A. Rintoul (90178), AAF.
- D. D. Rogers (37944).
- W. Rudd, MBE, (35344).
- A. W. Slater (73827), RAFVR.
- E. J. Smith (31025).
- R. A. Smith (73724), RAFVR.
- G. J. Spence (32209), RAFO.
- H. W. C. Springham (31033).
- M. Stockdale, DFC, (40440), RAFO.
- I. G. F. Stephen (90376), AAF.
- J. C. Taylor, MB, ChB, (23323).
- T. R. Thomas, DFC, (37662), RAFO.
- G. C. Tidd, OBE, (31196).
- P. S. V. Vallis (35348).
- J. W. Vernon (71139), RAFO.
- R. L. Vivian (34166), RAFO.
- L. W. Wells, OBE, (76395), RAFVR.
- W. C. F. A. Wilson, OBE, (76354), RAFVR.

Honorary Wing Commanders

- N. Cox-Walker.
- F. G. Smith, RAFVR.

Acting Wing Commanders

- F. G. H. Allen (101139), RAFVR.
- J. H. Ashaton (77456), RAFVR.
- H. Atkinson (68920), RAFVR.
- M. R. Attwater, DSO, DFC, (61253), RAFVR.
- S. G. Baggott, DFC, (40975), RAFO.
- S. B. Bailey (78157), RAFVR.
- A. Gidley-Baird (88747), RAFVR.
- T. W. la B. Bamford (39295), RAFO.
- J. Barraclough, DFC, AFC, (40662), RAFO.
- L. E. Barry (72607), RAFVR.
- E. L. T. Barton (85191), RAFVR.
- K. G. Bergin, MB, BCh, MRCS, LRCP, (77089), RAFVR,
- P. E. Bevington, DFC, (129918), RAFVR.
- H. G. Bird (91030), AAF.
- D. M. Brass, DSO, (40337).
- E. B. Bright (23375).
- W. T. Brooks, DSO, (39932), RAFO.
- W. M. Browne (79106), RAFVR.
- C. Mc. C. Buckley (68232), RAFVR.
- R. F. Budden (140309), RAFVR.
- R. S. Burles (31259), RAFO.
- R. H. C. Burwell, DFC, (40602), RAFO.
- G. J. Buxton, MBE, (44160).
- W. S P. Campbell (83518), RAFVR.
- J. R. Canham, DFC, (40799), RAFO.
- B. G. Carroll, GM, (37003).
- D. A. Catesby (84394), RAFVR.
- E. Cawston (81939), RAFVR.
- R. A. R. Chalmers (72983), RAFVR.
- W. H. Chapman (68939), RAFVR.
- E. C. Chesterton (75863), RAFVR.
- S. Conway (43208).
- H. F. Cook, OBE, (44145).
- J. K. M. Cooke, DSO, DFC, (42802), RAFO.
- A. S. Cooper (43896).
- G. A. Cornish (21259).
- F. E. Cowlrick (70143), RAFO.
- J. C. Gumming (176386), RAFVR.
- C. T. Davies, OBE, (44424).
- G. V. W. Davies (39226), RAFO.
- C. A. Denne (43570).
- J. T. Dickinson (86121), RAFVR.
- H. B. Digkson (105217), RAFVR.
- E. Donovan, DFC, (117677), RAFVR.
- G. J. Downs, MBE, (35332).
- T. Duncan (77607), RAFVR.
- E. G. Dumont (89390), RAFVR.
- J. E. Dunning (77542), RAFVR.
- A. E. Eaton, DSO, (75004), RAFVR.
- T. A. W. Edwards (77687), RAFVR.
- T. W. Ellcock, MBE, (43310).
- G. A. L. Elliot, DFC, (43830).
- R. D. Elliott, DFC, (76311).
- R. P. Elliott, DSO, DFC, (39631), RAFO.
- B. W. Finn (46386).
- H. J. Fisher, MC, (86523), RAFVR.
- H. M. Fisher (63138), RAFVR.
- W. H. Flint (40161), RAFO.
- G. Forrest (88258), RAFO.
- E. Fowler (83938), RAFVR.
- B. C. A. Fox (31369), RAFO.
- J. Freeman (89012), RAFVR.
- J. G. Freeman (43659).
- R. Frost (140260), RAFVR.
- D. R. M. Frostick (40381), RAFO.
- V. B. R. Gane (42118), RAFO.
- G. W. Gilpin, DFC, (89348), RAFVR.
- C. C. Glover (83878), RAFVR.
- A. J. Goar (75723), RAFVR.
- K. W. Godfrey (77353), RAFVR.
- J. C. W. Goldthorp (43964).
- W. G. Gow (82022), RAF Regiment.
- S. B. Grant (33417).
- L. F. A. Green (83753), RAFVR.
- D. R. Griffiths (42001), RAFO.
- T. R. Guthrie (89783), RAFVR.
- S. P. Hagger (77041), RAFVR.
- E. B. Harvey, MRCS, LRCP, (23287).
- W. J. Hendley, OBE, (43861).
- F. E. Hixon (76404), RAFVR.
- A. Holmes (10105).
- P. F. Humphreys (72293), RAFVR.
- P. Ward-Hunt, DFC, (39916), RAFO.
- K. O. G. Huntley, OBE, (79387), RAFVR.
- R. C. Jackson, MRCS, LRCP, (23351), RAFO.
- C. F. M. Jones, DSO, DFC, (81916), RAFVR.
- G. H. Jones (73970), RAFVR.
- T. W. V. Jones (184233), RAFVR.
- J. W. R. Kempe (72078), RAFVR.
- C. D. Landeau (112331), RAFVR.
- C. E. Langston, MBE, (43593).
- J. H. Lapsley, OBE, DFC, (33320).
- W. F. Le Petit (104796), RAFVR.
- H. H. B. Lewis (44001).
- W. J. Littlejohn (77945), RAFVR.
- A. S. Linney, OBE, (41717), RAFO.
- H. H. Lobb (108084), RAFVR.
- D. McArthur (72422), RAFVR.
- A. W. McCandlish (42412).
- F. V. MacLaine, MB, BCh, (23333).
- W. McMenemy (87094), RAFVR.
- C. G. Masters (37200).
- J. F. Mehigan, OBE, (13111).
- J. B. Methuen, MB, ChB, (72363), RAFVR.
- F. M. Milligan, AFC, (37453).
- G. Milner (72892), RAFVR.
- A. Muir (23335).
- S. Muir (43495).
- S. H. Mumford (86871), RAFVR.
- R. W. Nash (82420), RAFVR.
- E. A. Natzio (86169), RAFVR.
- J. B. Newton (65015), RAFVR.
- S. R. Newton, OBE, (44148).
- W. G. Oldbury, DFC, (37708), RAFO.
- A. W. Oldroyd, DFC, AFC, (37889), RAFO.
- W. P. Olesen (42570).
- A. S. Orr, OBE, (79958), RAFVR.
- F. W. Page, MBE, (43788).
- W. R. Parkhouse (76520), RAFO.
- W. N. Perioli, DFC, (39391), RAFO.
- J. M. N. Pike, DSO, DFC, (33200).
- G. T. Wynne-Powell, DFC. 1(90195), AAF.
- R. G. Prier (33094).
- F. A. Pumphrey, DCM, (75085), RAFVR.
- W. C. Putt (43809).
- J. V. Ouinn, LRCP&S, (72584), RAFVR.
- D. A. Reddick, DFC, AFC, (43522).
- D. K. Redford (73049), RAFVR.
- V. Rees (33335).
- M. W. Renaut, DFC, (114751), RAFVR.
- L. N. Reynolds (77822), RAFVR.
- W. J. Rivers (76408), RAFVR.
- K. W. J. Robertson (85370), RAFVR.
- G. M. Robinson, DFC, (42151), RAFO.
- J. J. Roche (38047), RAFO.
- R. D. Romanis (43888).
- E. T. Scott (70609), RAFO.
- G. R. T. Shillitoe (100199), RAFVR.
- H. P. R. Smith, AFC, MRCS, LRCP, MV, BCh, (23353), RAFO.
- I. S. Smith (43048).
- W. Smith (43496).
- R. C. Smylie, DFC, DFM, (68733), RAFVR.
- T. H. Snelling (72304), RAFVR.
- I. J. Spencer, DFC, (40150), RAFO.
- G. M. Somers (44321).
- H. C. Staines (21267).
- A. T. Staveley (39602), RAFO.
- W. Stuart (46339).
- E. Swale (74573), RAFVR.
- G. R. Swanwick (88315), RAFVR.
- H. J. Sweet (76228), RAFVR.
- T. Terrell (79661), RAFVR.
- D. H. Thomas, DSO, DFM, (46302).
- W. Thompson (43994).
- J. N. Tomes (36007).
- W. J. C. Tonge (78364), RAFVR.
- T. A. Trotter (41082), RAFO.
- C. E. Tucker, MBE, (44488).
- H. E. Turner, DSO, DFC, (111478), RAFVR.
- D. H. Villiers, DFC, (87068), RAFVR.
- E. O. Walker, MB, BCh, MRCS, LRCP, (90959), AAF.
- E. L. A. Walter, DFC, AFC, (32237), RAFO.
- P. H. Welch (84037), RAFVR.
- W. H. Westgate, MBE, (44275).
- D. F. Whitehead (78942), RAFVR.
- J. K. Wilkins (174492), RAFVR.
- C. M. Williams (35208).
- J. H. Woffindin, MBE, (43561).
- W. D. L. Filson-Young, DFC, (39725), RAFO.

Squadron Leaders

- D. J. Addis (73061), RAFVR.
- I. St. C. Alderdice (23179), RAFO.
- W. Allsopp (41357), RAFO.
- B. A. J. Arthure (117964), RAFVR.
- L. Ashdown (68964), RAFVR.
- J. E. Austin (44059).
- L. H. Bagley (23340).
- A. G. Baring (88861), RAFVR.
- A. J. Barnes (90724), AAF.
- W. Hurst-Barnes (72680), RAFVR.
- H. C. Barson, AFC, (80835), RAFVR.
- A. A. C. Bellinger (87222), RAFVR.
- F. A. Bidgood (43573).
- W. Blair (73792), RAFVR.
- J. F. Blayney (45692).
- K. E. R. Booth (87407), RAFVR.
- A. B. Boxall (120842), RAFVR.
- R. G. Bradbury (73595), RAFVR.
- C. J. A. G. Brain, DFC, (41660), RAFO.
- W. C. Brennan (46040).
- J. J. Briggs (90513), AAF.
- J. A. Brooks (77796), RAFVR.
- J. C. McC. Browne, MRCS, LRCP, (72040), RAFVR
- R. Bruce (71129), RAFO.
- F. R. Buckler (78512), RAFVR.
- R. G. Burns (78027), RAFVR.
- J. S. Cartwright (112599), RAFVR.
- R. Catchpole (83414), RAFVR.
- W. S. Chaney (78049), RAFVR.
- C. G. Coleman (69612), RAFVR.
- H. D. Connor (21169).
- A. W. Daniels (35022).
- L. Daly (75479), RAFVR.
- T. G. Davies, MB, MRCS, LRCP, DPH, LPL, (91215), AAF.
- W. L. H. Davies (72814), RAFVR.
- E. B. Pinder-Davis (72715), RAFVR.
- J. Davis (146172), RAFVR.
- K. G. Davis (40369), RAFO.
- K. M. Dawson (73157), RAFVR.
- A. G. Duiguid (37468), RAFO.
- H. E. Dyson (65626), RAFVR.
- G. Edwards, DFC, (39309), RAFO.
- K. B. H. Edwards (90519), AAF.
- M. J. Edwards (86150), RAFVR.
- L. Hinks-Edwards (40393), RAFO.
- R. Eidsforth (79570), RAFVR.
- E. M. Eldred (75704), RAFVR.
- M. J. Elworthy (40898).
- A. R. Enshaw (77844), RAFVR.
- E. O. Evans, MB, BS, MRCS, LRCP, (77522), RAFVR.
- R. B. Evans (21363).
- S. R. Evans (86056), RAFVR.
- W. E. W. Evans (85108), RAFVR.
- N. N. Ezekiel (40687), RAFO.
- N. W. Fisher (107839), RAFVR.
- A. C. Flavell (76281), RAFVR.
- A. Foden (73679), RAFVR.
- W. R. Foreman (23381), RAFO.
- D. A. Foster (76150), RAFVR.
- J. E. A. Foster (77933), RAFVR.
- A. W. Fowles (79589), RAFVR.
- F. L. Fox (87853), RAFVR.
- B. J. Frankenberg (81305), RAFVR.
- E. L. Fuller (75320), RAFVR.
- A. Gardner (88773), RAFVR.
- G. Garvock (48192).
- M. O. J. Gibson, MB, BCh, MRCP, MRCS, (62625), RAFVR.
- R. G. Gilbert (88942), RAFVR.
- H. G. Goacher (43869).
- R. H. Gollan (72320), RAFVR.
- P. A. M. Goudge (72218), RAFVR.
- R. Hadingham (40697), RAFO.
- S. T. Hale (75648), RAFVR.
- S. G. Hall (40222), RAFO.
- E. S. Harman (81767), RAFVR.
- H. A. Harrison (44687).
- N. I. B. Harrison (81125), RAFVR.
- W. W. Hart, MBE, (02176).
- E. J. Hasler (118797), RAFVR.
- K. J. Hattrick (31272), RAFO.
- H. Hemming (122513), RAFVR.
- H. J. Hemmings (44138).
- C. A. Hill (76114), RAFVR.
- G. Hill (71593), RAFVR.
- S. S. Hordern (67577), RAFVR.
- A. J. C. Hoskyns-Abrahall (83160), RAFVR.
- J. W. Hubbard (88154), RAFVR.
- J. E. Hunter (80688) RAFVR.
- R. E. Hunter, DFC, (40540), RAFO.
- B. J. Hyde (41025), RAFO.
- W. J. S. Jackson (85394), RAFVR.
- M. H. James (41424), RAFO.
- C. W. Janes (84058), RAFVR.
- F. C. Jones (78311), RAFVR.
- W. A. Jordan (86700), RAFVR.
- P. A. R. Juden (43324).
- N. H. Kaye (84188), RAFVR.
- A. H. Kerr (82370), RAFVR.
- T. Knight (46254).
- A. B. Knowles, MBE, (43429).
- E. C. Latter (46643).
- H. W. Leach (68917), RAFVR.
- J. Leadbetter (118242), RAFVR.
- F. W. Lee (72693), RAFVR.
- G. W. Leedham (43734).
- T. J. Lewis (87469), RAFVR.
- J. E. Lloyd (91123), AAF.
- D. G. Loghead (43779).
- C. W. Lockhart (76382), RAFVR.
- G. C. Lugg (17086).
- W. H. R. Lukey (72699), RAFVR.
- J. McAra (74642), RAFVR.
- G. S. Mace (112645), RAFVR.
- C. MacKay (79824), RAFVR.
- G. Mackinnon (65640), RAFVR.
- G. G. McLannahan (70434), RAFO.
- M. McLellan (23416), RAFO.
- W. C. McNeil (22048), RAFO.
- A. MacNicol (82893), RAFVR.
- R. MacPherson, MRCS, LRCP, (23433).
- L. A. Malins, DSO, DFC, (101019), RAFVR.
- J. T. Malone (44983).
- H. Maynard (90965), AAF.
- H. Mills (90542), AAF.
- F. S. Montague (86261), RAFVR.
- B. le B. Musgrave (74190), RAFVR.
- G. F. W. Newman (48156).
- F. G. Oakley (86489), RAFVR.
- G. J. W. Oddie (73800), RAFVR.
- S. G. Oxley (76298), RAFVR.
- L. D. H. Palmer (114936), RAFVR.
- W. G. R. Paris (43802).
- J. G. Parkin (22089).
- J. T. W. Parnell (43678).
- C. B. Payne (78453), RAFVR.
- D. B. Pinkney (76240), RAFVR.
- A. M. Pirie (39643).
- C. A. J. Plant (72919), RAFO.
- W. N. Pomphrey (83432), RAFVR.
- E. O. Porter (33355).
- H. A. Pound, MBE, (77638), RAFVR.
- T. C. Pratley (44322).
- W. F. Pretyman (143365), RAFVR.
- T. N. Railton (100774), RAFVR.
- C. W. R. Rayne-Davis (82927), RAFVR.
- J. W. Reade (23420).
- A. E. Renwick (90583), RAFVR.
- G. W. V. Revington (83152), RAFVR.
- R. W. A. Richards (85847), RAFVR.
- N. H. Richardson (72717), RAFVR.
- R. H. G. Rice (101102), RAFVR.
- E. F. Riddell (21338).
- W. F. Rimmer (19089).
- J. B. Robinson (87786), RAFVR.
- G. Ross (61412), RAFVR.
- W. T. Sanderson (79419), RAFVR.
- J. H. Saffery, DFC, (61457), RAFVR.
- E. T. Saunders, MBE, MM, (21260).
- A. W. Sawyer (73389), RAFVR.
- R. O. Sayers (43112).
- G.'A. Scott (78838), RAFVR.
- W. W. Sharp (47160).
- W. J. Silcox (44352).
- A. H. Simpson (68095).
- A. R, Simpson (75276), RAFVR.
- E. P. S, Snell (82493), RAFVR.
- C. W. Snook, (74230), RAFVR.
- R. L. Spurdle (44230).
- E. F. Stevens (88059), RAFVR.
- W. L. Stewart (87081), RAFVR.
- A. S. Summers (35889).
- E. A. Tilt (45026).
- R. W. Toft (90968), RAFVR.
- A. W. Trotter (87797), RAFVR.
- H. R. Tucker (44437).
- F. C. Turnham (106023), RAFVR.
- J. L. W. Wagland, DFC, (81937), RAFVR.
- W. Wallace (43313).
- A. H. Ward, AFM, (44588).
- W. A. Wargent (43799).
- J. Watson, MB, BCh, MRCS, LRCP, (78230), RAFVR.
- G. W. A. Webb (73473), RAFVR.
- G. J. Websdale, MC, (101595), RAFVR.
- D. West (69593), RAFVR.
- D. B. Wheeler (111615), RAFVR.
- M. V. Whitfield (41233).
- G. W. Whittaker, DSO, (73475), RAFVR.
- J. Wilson (91174), AAF.
- L. R. Winter (70744), RAFVR.
- A. Wood (45578).
- A. G. Woods (46257).
- F. B. Young (15239).
- G. F. Yuill (70767), RAFO.

Honorary Squadron Leader

- R. W. Piper (71171), RAFO.

Acting Squadron Leaders

- F. G. Abbott (47801).
- V. G. J. Agutter, DFC, (121948), RAFVR.
- J. W. Allwood (48995).
- H. Arthur (79032), RAFVR.
- B. D. F. Austen (61515), RAFVR.
- J. Ayling (112031), RAFVR.
- J. Baines (86498), RAFVR.
- C. A. Baker (85802), RAFVR.
- P. H. Baker (21268).
- S. A. W. Dalby-Ball (130012).
- E. H. G. Bangs (126818). RAFVR.
- C. A. Barnes (62268), RAFVR.
- E. Barnett (61189). RAFVR.
- L. D. A. Baron, DFC, (63083), RAFVR
- R. C. N. Barton (105661), RAFVR.
- W. Mc. G. Beaton (46859).
- R. B. Beck (100539), RAFVR.
- A. R. T. Beddow (33556).
- A. E. Beer (118552), RAFVR.
- A. E. Beeson (108556), RAFVR.
- G. R. Bernard (61866), RAFVR.
- R. Billings (77457), RAFVR.
- A. B. Bishop (79491), RAFVR.
- E. S. Bishop (43518).
- F. L. W. Bissenden (46184).
- J. P. Blackmore (45313).
- W. W. Blackstone (76093), RAFVR.
- B. P. Bleech (114150), RAFVR.
- N. M. Bode (134519), RAFVR.
- R. Boothman, DFC, (67085), RAFVR.
- J. D. Bowen (43315).
- H. C. Bownas (67044), RAFVR.
- E. N. Bradley (68870), RAFVR.
- E. J. Brandon (45084).
- A. Brees, DFC, (106178), RAFVR.
- A. R. S. Bridger (106201), RAFVR.
- F. Bridger (47519).
- A. W. G. Brown (107477), RAFVR.
- B. Brown (46691).
- G. W. Brown (86222). RAFVR.
- H. F. Brown (136125), RAFVR.
- J. Brown (78073), RAFVR.
- L. F. Brown (103139), RAFVR.
- O. T. Brown (100467), RAFVR.
- D. I. Buchanan (89035), RAFVR.
- W. J. Burton (103678), RAFVR.
- U. H. Buscall (86197), RAFVR.
- S. A. Cable (105872), RAFVR.
- F. S. Cadman (104425), RAFVR.
- W. S. A. Cairns (65415), RAFVR.
- W. L. Cameron (88537), RAFVR.
- P. A. Carrie (128691), RAFVR.
- H. J. Carter, DFC, (104474), RAFVR.
- J. F. L. Cartwright (45771).
- W. M. Caverhill (137518), RAFVR.
- A. C. Chadwick (65427), RAFVR.
- G. J. Chandler (107478), RAFVR.
- B. W. B. Chapman (78503), RAFVR.
- W. D. Charlton (105742), RAFVR.
- I. L. S. Chatfield (46538).
- J. G. Clark (113408), RAFVR.
- R. H. A. Clear (108138), RAFVR.
- G. Cockerham (80610), RAFVR.
- E. L. Cohn 7(147915), RAFVR.
- G. W. Coker (31387), RAFO.
- J. M. Collinge (109173), RAFVR.
- R. M. Comber (116127), RAFVR.
- T. H. Compton (47933).
- G. V. Constant (85798), RAFVR.
- G. E. Cornes, DFM, (136806), RAFVR.
- D. R. Cox, DFC, (142876), RAFVR.
- C. W. S. Crabbe (91027), AAF.
- G. J. Cribb (120431), RAFVR.
- W. Crisp (111144), RAFVR.
- I. B. Croker (136169), RAFVR.
- E. S. G. Cropper (73141), RAFVR.
- F. J. S. Culley (106973), RAFVR.
- J. L. Curd (78573), RAFVR.
- A. G. Curtis (87585), RAFVR.
- T. R. Danby, DFC, (111100), RAFVR.
- K. C. D. Dart, DFC, (42397).
- P. W. Davies (43817).
- R. B. Davies (40995), RAFO.
- J. H. Day, DFC, (102603), RAFVR.
- W. B. Day (49185).
- R. A. Death (110507), RAFVR.
- F. R. Derry, DFC, (87862), RAFVR.
- F. J. R. Dodd, MBE, (123746), RAFVR.
- D. J. Dorey (18096).
- M. Douglas, (88595), RAFVR.
- F. W. Dowling (43604).
- C. C. Downing (75121), RAFVR.
- D. B. Drage (83347), RAFVR.
- J. A. Duncan (60474), RAFVR.
- P. Duxfield (43898).
- G. Edney (108381), RAFVR.
- H. Edwards, DCM, MM, (120017), RAFVR.
- R. Efstathiou (79883), RAFVR.
- V. E. Element (43751).
- J. R. Emmerson, DFC, AFM, (128677), RAFVR.
- J. L. T. Evans (88940), RAFVR.
- J. R. Evans, DFC, (159719), RAFVR.
- J. R. Every (126918), RAFVR.
- R. G. Fall (81120), RAFVR.
- E. Farnes (77374), RAFVR.
- J. G. Fee (62227), RAFVR.
- W. J. F. Fenton (48030).
- J. Fenwick (63853), RAFVR.
- J. Fingh, DFC, (64308), RAFVR.
- D. P. Finnimore (103170), RAFVR.
- A. Firth (46646).
- J. R. Fisher (31316), RAFO.
- F. E. Fletcher (89040), RAFVR.
- K. G. Flintoft (104366), RAFVR.
- C. H. P. Florence (86014), RAFVR.
- A. H. Foord, DFC, (60790), RAFVR.
- W. J. E. Forward (104597), RAFVR.
- A. E. Foster (105668), RAFVR.
- E. Foster (122074), RAFVR.
- R. A. Foster (45217).
- L. B. Francis (101157), RAFVR.
- H. N. Frankland (123564), RAFVR.
- C. H. W. Frost (77490), RAFVR.
- W. H. Furness (84186), RAFVR.
- D. M. Gall, DFC, (64310), RAFVR.
- P. W. Gallegos (112543), RAFVR.
- J. E. Garlick (48294), RAFVR.
- J. S. Geary, MBE, (68071), RAFVR.
- J. P. Geoghegan (62263), RAFVR.
- A. J. George (44987).
- L. J. George (61185), RAFVR.
- E. M. Gibbs, DFC, (43200).
- H. B. Gibson (66628), RAFVR.
- H. S. Gibson (44512).
- C. J. Gittins (46225).
- R. E. Gollop (44731).
- P. T. Gifford-Nash (85469), RAFVR.
- A. N. Goold (100762), RAFVR.
- A. W. Gordon (118785), RAFVR.
- C. J. Cover (149923), RAFVR.
- H. J. Grantham (64775), RAFVR.
- W. R. Green (104383), RAFVR.
- W. P. Greening (113984), RAFVR.
- T. D. Griffin (84408), RAFVR.
- W. F. Haines (48113).
- F. C. Hall (103769), RAFVR.
- H. Halson (81594), RAFVR.
- L. Hamer (118262), RAFVR.
- R. F. N. Hanke (112790), RAFVR.
- C. C. Hanrott (60700), RAFVR.
- H. W. Harcus (75071), RAFVR.
- A. V. Hardy (73963), RAFVR.
- A. Hargreaves (81868), RAFVR.
- F. V. Hargreaves (107594), RAFVR.
- R. H. Harris (21297), RAFO.
- G. J. M. Hart (42835), RAFO.
- J. G. Hart (84471), RAFVR.
- W. C. Hart (78008), RAFVR.
- G. C. Hartill (82484), RAFVR.
- P. J. V. P. Henniker-Heaton (82910), RAFVR.
- G. C. Hibberd (107973), RAFVR.
- J. W. H. Hickox (103778), RAFVR.
- R. T. Hill (85846), RAFVR.
- W. Hill (110471), RAFVR.
- F. K. Kindle, DFC, (119130), RAFVR.
- C. A. Hodder (45613).
- A. G. Holdsworth (89089), RAFVR.
- G. A. Holland (107238), RAFVR.
- M. H. E. Holmes (88281), RAFVR.
- T. J. Holmes (48177).
- J. Hope (103243), RAFVR.
- J. A. Hope, DFC, (111768), RAFVR.
- E. M. Hornby (79263), RAFVR.
- G. O. Horne (137099), RAFVR.
- J A. H. Horton (84380), RAFVR.
- G. C. Howard (84944), RAFVR.
- J. A. Howard, DFC, (128372), RAFVR.
- L. K. Howard (115263), RAFVR.
- M. W. Hubble (49742).
- T. M. Hull (47677).
- H. L. Hulme, DFC, (89227), RAFVR.
- J. S. Humphreys (41928), RAFO.
- C. D. Hutchinson (79098), RAFVR.
- R. J. Hyde, AFC, (115301), RAFVR.
- T. A. M. Jack (105142), RAFVR.
- W. A. Jack (48792).
- J. A. G. Jackson, DFC, (122763), RAFVR.
- J. E. B. Jefferson, DFC, (117136), RAFVR.
- F. L. Jenkins (44354).
- J. N. Jenkinson (123926), RAFVR.
- A. Jennings (86088), RAFVR.
- H. Jepson (108912), RAFVR.
- E. D. Jones (51174).
- H. B. Jones (83677), RAFVR.
- H. H. Jones (102772), RAFVR.
- F. R. R. Kaye (75882), RAFVR.
- E. A. Kelsey (60216), RAFVR.
- F. W. J. Kemp (46248).
- L. Kendrick (49462).
- G. Kerr, DFC, (61269), RAFVR.
- J. F. Kill (112653), RAFVR.
- C. G. Kimbrey (47535).
- J. G. Owen-King (60139), RAFVR.
- A. J. J. Kirk (45979).
- F. T. Kitchen (84113), RAFVR.
- R. C. Kitchen (102130), RAFVR.
- J. U. Lamont (104793), RAFVR.
- R. F. P. Landon (79850), RAFVR.
- G. Law (44859).
- F. H. Lawrence (87533), RAFVR.
- D. Lawson (43509).
- E. D. L. Lee, DFC, (43102).
- H. W. Lees (115558), RAFVR.
- T. M. Leigh (65637), RAFVR.
- R. V. Leitch (44468).
- E. M. Lewis (77299), RAFVR.
- O. Lewis (122415), RAFVR.
- W. L. Lewis (46980).
- T. F. A. H. Lindsay (78790), RAFVR.
- F. E. Lissimore, MBE, (115833), RAFVR.
- J. G. R. Lodge (1103111), RAFVR.
- A. G. Logan (47611).
- E. w. Lowden (122508), RAFVR.
- H. A. C. Luckham (112350), RAFVR.
- C. A. Lyall (107703), RAFVR.
- D. M. McHaffie, MBE, (50143).
- M. McIntyre (46140).
- J. MacL. MacKay, MB, ChB, DPH, (2115) (employed with RAF Medical Branch).
- A. MacLean (120893), RAFVR.
- D. S. McNeil (89232), RAFVR.
- J. T. Main (44297).
- L. G. W. Mallows (77394), RAFVR.
- A. T. Manning (113162), RAFVR.
- R. W. Manuel (133030), RAFVR.
- H. F. T. Martin (62437), RAFVR.
- F. Metcalfe (79956), RAFVR.
- F. C. Miller (63358), RAFVR.
- H. W. Moore (146846), RAFVR.
- J. Moore (104166), RAFVR.
- J. A. Mulford (48676), RAFVR.
- A. D. Murfin (110926), RAFVR.
- A. C. Needham (49383).
- J. T. Newington (68930), RAFVR.
- W. H. Newman (47984).
- N. C. G. Newnham (43743).
- K. W. Nicholson (118500), RAFVR.
- P. Nuttall (91142), AAF.
- A. F. O'Connor (87168), RAFVR.
- A. O'Malley (133849), RAFVR.
- F. Ormonroyd, DFM, (115569), RAFVR.
- J. S. Orr (44743).
- G. P. Owen (46933).
- E. H. Page (81575), RAFVR.
- E. G. Pannell (86680), RAFVR.
- A. Pape (135818), RAFVR.
- J. C. Parry, DFC, (114461), RAFVR.
- J. F. Parsons (83130). RAFVR.
- J. A. Paul (80751), RAFVR.
- C. R. Payne (81833), RAFVR.
- I. C. B. Pearce (86301), RAFVR.
- G. A. Pearson (46106).
- A. E. Peart (47625).
- W. A. Pendlebury (48972).
- R. Pengelly (44430).
- A. G. Perrin (129388), RAFVR.
- D. G. Perry (45126).
- J. S. Perry (60774), RAFVR.
- E. E. Philipp (78517), RAFVR.
- A. H. G. Pickering (112643), RAFVR.
- D. V. C. Cotes-Preedy, DFC, GM, (41987), RAFO.
- C. G. Printice (48431).
- N. K. Price (104127), RAFVR.
- O. R. C. Prior (86248), RAFVR.
- L. E. Provis (78789), RAFVR.
- R. Quorn (46824).
- R. S. Radley, DFC, (83263), RAFVR.
- G. H. Ramsay (79972), RAFVR
- L. H. Rattenbury (88161), RAFVR.
- J. M. Rattray (79639), RAFVR.
- R. T. Raw (74215), RAFVR.
- R. A. Read, DFC, (117643), RAFVR.
- F. J. Readings (74311), RAFVR.
- W. Redman (109914), RAFVR.
- W. J. Renwick (44013).
- A. H. Riseley, DSO, (106080), RAFVR.
- N. Roberts (83896), RAFVR.
- G. M. Robertson, DFC, (86657), RAFVR.
- H. D. Robinson (101708), RAFVR.
- C. M. Skerrett-Rogers (61385), RAFVR.
- H. J. Rowe (48910).
- D. C. Russell (84840), RAFVR.
- D. C. Rustom, DFC, (87411), RAFVR.
- L. H. Sagar (90320), AAF.
- J. Sanderson (76121), RAFVR.
- G. W. Sawkins (43756).
- L. C. Saxby (75719), RAFVR.
- F. Schofield (46436).
- H. Scott (156220), RAFVR.
- D. W. Sherwen (62719), RAFVR.
- A. R. Sherwood (47574).
- R. Shillcock (85838), RAFVR.
- G. F. Shute (102648), RAFVR.
- T. D. Simmonds (131920), RAFO.
- K. F. Simmonds (79989), RAFVR.
- A. F. Simmons (46444).
- J. S. Skelly (120172). RAFVR.
- E. D. Skepper (74756), RAFVR.
- M. T. Slee (83325), RAFVR.
- O. C. A. Slocock (88295), RAFVR.
- A. P. Smallman, DSO, AFC, (88043), RAFVR.
- B. A. S. Smeed (45693).
- S. H. Smiles (79993), RAFVR.
- J. A. R. Smit (74027), RAFVR.
- G. Smith (47551).
- N. A. Copley-Smith (91133), AAF.
- P. Y. H. Smith, DSO, (72942), RAFVR.
- R. E. Smith (79640), RAFVR.
- T. S. Smith (79676), RAFVR.
- A. G. Sollis (46507).
- A. W. Southall, DSO, DFC, (43075).
- J. H. Spence (129327), RAFVR.
- C. J. J. Sperring (104009), RAFVR.
- F. W. T. Sprules (68928), RAFVR.
- T. F. Stewart (68680), RAFVR.
- H. W. M. Stott (44109).
- A. G. Stirk (65067), RAFVR.
- F. W. Owens (85721), RAFVR.
- D. Stirling (43456).
- W. G. S. Summers (46259).
- D. R. R. H. Surgeoner (83397), RAFVR.
- H. G. Swindells (84635), RAFVR.
- G. B. Sylvester (88449), RAFVR.
- R. M. Talbot (63794), RAFVR.
- A. R. Taylor (104027), RAFVR.
- E. G. Taylor (109295), RAFVR.
- F. D. Taylor (74391), RAFVR.
- J. F. Taylor (78122), RAFVR.
- W. D. Tennant (68902), RAFVR.
- A. L. Thompson (104032), RAFVR.
- E. A. Thompson (64216), RAFVR.
- W. H. Thompson, DFC, (104578), RAFVR.
- S. L. Thomson (82031), RAFVR.
- E. R. Thorn, DFC, DFM, (46957).
- E. H. Tidswell (86885), RAFVR.
- J. G. Timpson (110282), RAFVR.
- T. G. Tindale (119492), RAFVR.
- S. F. Tolman (73914), RAFVR.
- N. J. Cely-Trevilian (121636), RAFVR.
- E. T. Tucker (46321).
- C. M. Tuffley (114084), RAFVR.
- R. J. M. Turner, DFC, (129741), RAFVR.
- B. H. Tweedale (86352), RAFVR.
- P. G. Tyler (31471), RAFO.
- H. G. Vevers, MBE, (89955), RAFVR.
- E. M. Child-Villiers (41901), RAFO.
- S. W. Waller (31489).
- L. Walsh (87213), RAFVR.
- C. S. Watkinson (77693), RAFVR.
- G. Whatling (43916).
- A. A. R. Watts (84785), RAFVR.
- G. W. Webb (114093), RAFVR.
- H. Whalley (45404).
- R. G. White (68130), RAFVR.
- T. N. O. White, DFC, (60468), RAFVR.
- D. C. Wilde (83291), RAFVR.
- C. J. Williams (78954), RAFVR.
- J. E. Williams (62796), RAFVR.
- J. N. Williams (66482), RAFVR.
- W. A. Williamson, DFC, (107159), RAFVR.
- E. A. Wilson (88589), RAFVR.
- W. Wilson (76091), RAFVR.
- G. B. Windeler (63795), RAFVR.
- B. H. Wood (78198), RAFVR.
- E. A. Wood (89502), RAFVR.
- R. T. Wood (46469).
- H. C. A. Woodward (155445), RAFVR.
- A. V. Woollett (74253), RAFVR.
- T. P. Worthing (52844).
- G. C. Wright (67031), RAFVR.
- J. Wright (43017).
- L. J. Wright (48411).
- T. A. Yates, MBE, (45775)
- S. J. R. Yelloly (120709), RAFVR.
- A. Youdan (60363), RAFVR.

Flight Lieutenants

- J. D. Adamson, DFC, (114140), RAFVR.
- J. Allan (53881).
- M. Allanson (116754), RAFVR.
- G. H. Allen (125663), RAFVR.
- E. Anderson (124723), RAFVR.
- W. G. Anderson (140132), RAFVR.
- F. D. Andrews (62732), RAFVR.
- C. A. W. Archer (100971), RAFVR.
- P. A. Askew (112477), RAFVR.
- R. D. Astle (60038), RAFVR.
- W. W. Atkinson (130084). RAFVR.
- D. J. Attenborough (88252), RAFVR.
- K. G. Back (144609), RAFVR.
- C. E. Badley (88745), RAFVR.
- R. G. M. Baggott (109419), RAFVR.
- W. Bagnall (142480), RAFVR.
- G. Balcombe (128967), RAFVR.
- W. J. P. Baldwin (179158), RAFVR.
- D. W. Balshaw (116924), RAFVR.
- G. W. Banwell (147375), RAFVR.
- S. G. A. Bartlett (121763), RAFVR.
- J. P. Bassett (122339), RAFVR.
- D. A. Beauclair (40493), RAFO.
- B. R. Beeston (175338), RAFVR.
- A. A. B. Beeton (84345), RAFVR.
- P. C. Bennett (88532), RAFVR.
- N. D. Benson (68209), RAFVR.
- A. C. Bentley (47854).
- W. Bertram (126057), RAFVR.
- J. E. Bilton (81552), RAFVR.
- A. B. Bingham (47181).
- G. Blake, DFC, (142455), RAFVR.
- N. N. Blaxland (138220), RAFVR.
- R. E. Bodey (89267), RAFVR.
- J. W. Bond (135524), RAFVR.
- H. A. Bone (105730), RAFVR.
- G. Bonham (121629), RAFVR.
- W. H. Bonner (152619), RAFVR.
- L. G. Boore (62372), RAFVR.
- K. V. Boothroyd (150459), RAFVR.
- S. A. F. Bowen (42298). RAFO.
- D. F. Bowering (75595). RAFVR.
- J. A. B. Boyd (79328), RAFVR.
- J. Bradbury (118507), RAFVR.
- G. W. Brake, DFC, (145737), RAFVR.
- G. A. W. Brandreth (687.65), RAFVR.
- E. S. Brawn (86276), RAFVR.
- J. H. P. Briggs (82228), RAFVR.
- W. G. Brinn, DFC, DFM, (46463).
- J. R. Broad (81430), RAFVR.
- B. P. K. Brooks (124385), RAFVR.
- N. E. Brown (141705), RAFVR.
- R. Brown (119532), RAFVR.
- R. E. Brown (133875), RAFVR.
- L. R. Brownlee (61890), RAFVR.
- G. L. Bruce (117132), RAFVR.
- K. M. Bryan (80722), RAFVR.
- L. Buchan (61194), RAFVR.
- R. F. Bumstead (53138).
- A. Bunce (53712).
- D. J. Burgess (190967), RAFVR.
- P. W. G. Burgess (45887).
- G. J. H. Burkby (132355), RAFVR.
- W. A. W. Burma (81659), RAFVR.
- D. I. Burns (63907), RAFVR.
- J. Burns, DFM, (146834), RAFVR.
- M. F. Burrage (115113), RAFVR.
- R. P. Burton (124498), RAFVR.
- R. H. F. Butcher (61068), RAFVR.
- B. S. Cadman (119115), RAFVR.
- T. H. T. Cairns, DFC, DFM, (46338).
- A. C. Camm (100468), RAFVR.
- S. H. Carder (129237), RAFVR.
- A. G. E. Carter (132487), RAFVR.
- P. Cartlidge (140153), RAFVR.
- P. E. N. Catchpole (83522), RAFVR.
- J. A. Chaldecott (73942), RAFVR.
- W. H. O. Challinor (102775), RAFVR.
- J. W. E. Challis (146882), RAFVR.
- G. S. Chalmers (131146), RAFVR.
- O. Chan (116430), RAFVR.
- B. K. Chandler (140410), RAFVR.
- A. M. Charlesworth (100646), RAFVR.
- K. E. Christensen (123190), RAFVR.
- J. S. Christie (157629), RAFVR.
- J. R. Chubb (143572), RAFVR.
- D. W. J. Clark (143432), RAFVR.
- K. S. Clarke (85948), RAFVR.
- M. G. Clarke (103075), RAFVR.
- W. H. Clarke (60668), RAFVR.
- T. H. Clayton (139103), RAFVR.
- C. A. L. Cliffe (144204), RAFVR.
- J. Cobb, DFC, (51114).
- H. F. Cole (170091), RAFVR.
- G. F. Collins (81189), RAFVR.
- F. Collis (170422), RAFVR.
- A. Connell (86198), RAFVR.
- C. Connolly (89744), RAFVR.
- H. C. P. Cook (155326), RAFVR.
- L. Cook (45220).
- E. D. C. Cooper (89377), RAFVR.
- J. J. Cooper (152927), RAFVR.
- J. B. Copley (90525), AAF.
- H. G. Cordiner (102783), RAFVR.
- G. A. Corfield (132256), RAFVR.
- G. H. Coveney (47157).
- L. H. Cowley (52702).
- W. C. M. Cox (133777), RAFVR.
- D. J. Coxell (150374), RAFVR.
- R. B. Craig (47282).
- A. H. Crane-Barnes (100969), RAFVR.
- C. R. Crickmay (85100), RAFVR.
- J. Crosby (53766).
- C. J. Cross (128854), RAFVR.
- J. R. Cross (127813), RAFVR.
- W. C. Crowe (136694), RAFVR.
- P. J. Crowley (49806), RAFVR.
- G. A. Croxford (149120), RAFVR.
- A. J. Curry (49872).
- C. Curry (133721), RAFVR.
- T. W. P. Curtis, DFC, (116949), RAFVR.
- M. Cutler (130898), RAFVR.
- R. W. Dalton (115715), RAFVR.
- R. J. Dalziel (136608), RAFVR.
- G. Davidson (127288), RAFVR.
- S. M. Davidson (50854).
- J. C. W. Davies (55027).
- P. Davies (151476), RAFVR.
- P. S. Davies (78928), RAFVR.
- V. Davies (132228), RAFVR.
- H. Davison (41675), RAFO.
- D. H. Davy (139507), RAFVR.
- W. J. Dawson (89249), RAFVR.
- H. M. Dean (136502), RAFVR.
- L. T. Dean (142093), RAFVR.
- F. C. Deane (49050).
- N. B. Denniss (122812), RAFVR.
- D. W. Densham (79037), RAFVR.
- T. S. Dickson (90845), AAF.
- E. F. Dixon (79695), RAFVR.
- F. A. Dixon ( 135968), RAFVR.
- I. A. Dobie (101056), RAFVR.
- N. C. Doubleday (84398), RAFVR.
- C. Dowell (106134), RAFVR.
- N. A. Doyle (50462).
- B. Drew (86123), RAFVR.
- T. Duncan (151494), RAFVR.
- G. C. Dunn, DFC, (149315), RAFVR.
- L. D. Dunnett (129234) RAFVR.
- M. B. Eason (147290), RAFVR.
- E. S. Ellis, DFC, CGM, (161600), RAFVR.
- F. Ellis (117724), RAFVR.
- F. C. Ellis (125937), RAFVR.
- H. R. Ellis (63473), RAFVR.
- C. F. Elphick (46363).
- G. Emmett (148765), RAFVR.
- G. Escott (128572), RAFVR.
- J. L. Evans (146140), RAFVR.
- T. W. Fagg, DFC, (118827), RAFVR.
- R. D. Fairley (109930), RAFVR.
- A. E. Feather (44870).
- W. Feit (80327), RAFVR.
- F. Ferguson (147940), RAFVR.
- N. Fidler (123877), RAFVR.
- I. B. Fiske (103741), RAFVR.
- W, D. Fleet (46555).
- H. E. Foard (89672), RAFVR.
- K. B. Forbes (157300), RAFVR.
- J. C. Ford (43677).
- J. B. Foster (128942), RAFVR.
- W. Forsyte (86015), RAFVR.
- D. R. Fray (126007), RAFVR.
- F. G. Fray, DFC, (120653), RAFVR.
- H. D. Freeth (126477), RAFVR.
- H. M. Friend (85467), RAFVR.
- R. A. Fry (67200), RAFVR.
- W. D. Gaffney (47386).
- L. W. Gale (140856), RAFVR.
- N. N. Galer (148904), RAFVR.
- M. P. Gallemaerts (109498), RAFVR.
- A. M. N. Gardner (157838), RAFVR.
- R. E. F. Gardner (86016), RAFVR.
- H. Garthwaite (144633), RAFVR.
- G. F. Gawith (135644), RAFVR.
- M. G. Gibbons (150393), RAFVR.
- N. L. Gibbs (116690), RAFVR.
- G. E. G. Gibson (73958), RAFVR.
- P. Gibson (135085), RAFVR.
- P. A. Gifkins (64311), RAFVR.
- A. R. Gilding (48558), RAFVR.
- G. W. Giles (104757), RAFVR.
- A. L. Gillan (44394).
- J. C. Gillett (101161), RAFVR.
- P. F. Gillies (86077), RAFVR.
- L. C. Glover (115234), RAFVR.
- E. F. Goater (45172).
- A. Godfrey (114786), RAFVR.
- R. Goodfellow (67708), RAFVR.
- R. Gore (100621), RAFVR.
- C. K. M. Gracie (145668), RAFVR.
- M. A. Graham (137439), RAFVR.
- W. E. Graham (129006), RAFVR.
- I. C. Grant (151526), RAFVR.
- A. A. Green, DFC, (144317), RAFVR.
- R. C. C. Green (80684), RAFVR.
- A. W. Griffiths (147506), RAFVR.
- A. J. Grottick (136572), RAFVR.
- S. Gruber (101799), RAFVR.
- A. W. Guest (137617), RAFVR.
- Sir A. A. St. L. L. Guinness (82856), RAFVR.
- A. R. Halder (135376), RAFVR.
- A. W. Hall (100001), RAFVR.
- P. E. L. Halls (45235).
- K. A. Hancock (140635), RAFVR.
- C. S. Hancox (90811), AAF.
- G. E. Harding (90882), AAF.
- J. E. Hards (50841).
- C. Hardy (151024), RAFVR.
- W. J. Harrad (45568).
- C. W. J. Harradence (117584), RAFVR.
- D. F. Harris (141557), RAFVR.
- M. G. Harris (146620), RAFVR.
- M. T. Harris (126094), RAFVR.
- W. V. Hartley (136034). RAFVR.
- E. J. Haslam (50918).
- R. H. Hayhoe (103327), RAFVR.
- L. Haines (104565), RAFVR.
- F. E. Haynes (143418), RAFVR.
- S. P. Head (49005).
- W. H. Heane, DFC, (147670), RAFVR.
- N. J. G. Hill (110498), RAFVR.
- R. W. Hilliers (117534), RAFVR.
- D. J. Hinds (140083), RAFVR.
- G. S. Hine (152315), RAFVR.
- H. A. Hitchcock, DFC, (120853), RAFVR.
- F. Hobson, MC, (86517), RAFVR.
- J. G. Y. Hodge (150396), RAFVR.
- T. C. P. Hodges (158290), RAFVR.
- C. R. Holmes (133332), RAFVR.
- H. A. Hooper, DFC, AFC, (142577), RAFVR.
- J. B. Hooper (63372), RAFVR.
- E. Houghton (73236), RAFVR.
- S. J. Houghton (127136), RAFVR.
- J. Howarth (134658), RAFVR.
- V. D. Howe (148025), RAFVR.
- M. J. Howlett (117374), RAFVR.
- T. A. W. Hoyland (128822), RAFVR.
- R. Hoyle (140189), RAFVR.
- L. W. Hubbert (140261), RAFVR.
- W. Huey (86283), RAFVR.
- A. M. Hughes (133677), RAFVR.
- S. J. Hunt (60213), RAFVR.
- W. Hunter, DFC, (103049), RAFVR.
- R. H. Hutchings (46889).
- E. F. Hyde (101101), RAFVR.
- R. A. Ingles (47810).
- B. St. J. Inglis (64877), RAFVR.
- F. L. F. Innes. (117870), RAFVR.
- J. L. Ireland (138819), RAFVR.
- G. N. Irving, DFC, (121046), RAFVR.
- H. R. H. F. Irwin, DFC, (47305).
- J. H. Jacobs (88629), RAFVR.
- K. W. James (140147), RAFVR.
- S. James (47916).
- B. C. Jarvis (123125), RAFVR.
- E. Jary (139136), RAFVR.
- G. V. Jelly (122405), RAFVR.
- G. D. Jenkins (77649), RAFVR.
- K. L. O. Jenner (63234), RAFVR.
- C. C. Jerromes, DFC, (133218), RAFVR.
- P. W. Jewell (63099), RAFVR.
- S. R. Johns (121993), RAFVR.
- J. F. Johnson (51270).
- R. A. Johnson, DFC, (116721), RAFVR.
- R. H. Johnson (137334), RAFVR.
- F. H. Jones (123171), RAFVR.
- K. A. Jones (138199), RAFVR.
- L. Jones (155867), RAFVR.
- J. F. R. Jones (128559), RAFVR.
- R. E. Jones (151710), RAFVR.
- S. C. Jones. (47091).
- T. R. R. Jones (152429), RAFVR.
- L. J. Jupp (105791), RAFVR.
- H. Kaye (115648), RAFVR.
- H. E. G. Keast (43124).
- F. Keay (140391), RAFVR.
- A. E. Kefford (123535), RAFVR.
- H. P. Kelway (117472), RAFVR.
- C. F. Kevis (46064).
- A. G. Ridley (10682), RAFVR.
- E. T. King (137561), RAFVR.
- W. A. A. Kinge (65043), RAFVR.
- J. W. Kippax (48427).
- G. S. Kitcher (130058), RAFVR.
- H. H. Knighton (64329), RAFVR.
- P. S. Kyd (117490), RAFVR.
- J. Kyle (125926), RAFVR.
- C. G. Lacey (130279), RAFVR.
- F. R. Lamb (151859), RAFVR.
- P. Landers (61500), RAFVR.
- G. J. Lane (116687), RAFVR.
- L. A. Lane (82227), RAFVR.
- J. W. Langdon (128091), RAFVR.
- P. V. Langler (124223), RAFVR.
- G. Lansdell, DFC, (116745), RAFVR.
- T. R. S. Lawson (47236).
- R. Leafe (161420), RAFVR.
- T. W. Leary (54299), RAFVR.
- A. P. Lemmon (45018).
- R. A. M. Lemmon (123242), RAFVR.
- M. S. Lewin (67327), RAFVR.
- C. E. Lewis (116054), RAFVR.
- V. E. Lewis (120556), RAFVR.
- J. C. P. Lloyd (134499), RAFVR.
- J. L. Logan (159462), RAFVR.
- L. R. Lord (144010), RAFVR.
- G. H. Louden (137154), RAFVR.
- R. D. Luckwell (63450), RAFVR.
- J. C. Lumgair (115610), RAFVR.
- A. S. Lyburn (138102), RAFVR.
- H. A. MacBean (108421), RAFVR.
- W. R. M. McClelland (68191), RAFVR.
- R. A. N. McCready (126157), RAFVR.
- S. F. McConnell (64243), RAFVR.
- W. McDonald, DFM, (142140), RAFVR.
- R. M. T. M. B. MacDonald (144028), RAFVR.
- G. E. McFall (122457), RAFVR.
- D. H. MacGillivray (113158), RAFVR.
- A. H. McGrady (48780).
- W. B. MacGregor (112356), RAFVR.
- W. F. McIlgrew (158561), RAFVR,
- R. McKechnie (112358), RAFVR.
- N. McLeod (74890), RAFVR.
- A. MacPherson (153613), RAFVR.
- N. S. R. McMinn, DFM, (161485), RAFVR.
- K. MacVicar, DFC, (122153), RAFVR.
- E. A. Malkin (138857), RAFVR.
- B. E. E. Marshall (112010), RAFVR.
- G. W. Martin, DFM, (156450), RAFVR.
- A. J. P. Marvin (124771), RAFVR.
- D. Mason (149627), RAFVR.
- F. W. Mason (138373), RAFVR.
- C. Matson (118386), RAFVR.
- E. J. Matthews (87806), RAFVR.
- R. M. S. Matthews (138142), RAFVR.
- T. S. Matthews (142894), RAFVR.
- R. Mattison (147955), RAFVR.
- S. L. Meadows (149413), RAFVR.
- W. A. D. Mears (106001), RAFVR.
- M. A. Menier (87095), RAFVR.
- J. D. Meredith (128554), RAFVR.
- A. S. H. Mills (86186), RAFVR.
- H. A. L. V. Mitchell (133377), RAFVR.
- J. H. Mitchell (140487), RAFVR.
- E. Montagu-Smith (82301), RAFVR.
- J. E. Morris (119282), RAFVR.
- P. L. W. Morton (90921), AAF.
- J. Morton (52501).
- W. A. T. Morton (127832), RAFVR.
- A. V. Motley (61592), RAFVR.
- D. L. Mumford (142042), RAFVR.
- M. H. Baker-Munton (138680), RAFVR.
- C. Murgatroyd (127263), RAFVR.
- G. Murphy (127992), RAFVR.
- R. Murray (138341), RAFVR.
- J. G. Musgrave (103571), RAFVR.
- J. K. Napier (60922), RAFVR.
- R. M. Nelson, DFC, (146304), RAFVR.
- C. E.Nicholson, BM, BCh, LMSSA, (4580) (employed with RAF Medical Branch).
- P. A. Nicholson (142073), RAFVR.
- G. Niven (85789), RAFVR.
- R. W. Niven (125915). RAFVR.
- W. Nixon (157757), RAFVR.
- S. W. Norman (126731), RAFVR.
- J. G. November (112609), RAFVR.
- P. C. O'Neill-Dunne (116609), RAFVR.
- F. L. O'Reilly (124850), RAFVR.
- A. G. O'Shaughnessy (141526), RAFVR.
- K. T. A. O'Sullivan, DFC, (127032), RAFVR.
- L. R. Page, DFM, (51635).
- H. D. Parbrook (102643), RAFVR.
- D. R. B. Park (86038), RAFVR.
- A. J. Parker (147901), RAFVR.
- J. P. Parker (90695), AAF.
- K. S. Parker (85152), RAFVR.
- J. H. Parsonage (49303).
- D. W. Patston (73331), RAFVR.
- J. J. Pattinson, DFC, (124698), RAFVR.
- C. G. Payne (45526).
- G. E. Payne (132499), RAFVR.
- J. F. Payne (89000), RAFVR.
- S. J. Payne (135742), RAFVR.
- C. M. Pearse (148185), RAFVR.
- D. Pearson (138593), RAFVR.
- G. R. Pearson (85126), RAFVR.
- W. F. Pearson (135414), RAFVR.
- R. Peel (21201).
- S. J. Perkins (124817), RAFVR.
- H. N. Petry (131884), RAFVR.
- H. H. V. Phelps (65153), RAFVR.
- H. B. Phillips (143803), RAFVR.
- T. G. M. Pimblott (133009), RAFVR.
- J. R. Pinder (63754), RAFVR.
- A. Neville-Polley (81138), RAFVR.
- C. N. Pollock (80708), RAFVR.
- R. E. Pope (81360), RAFVR.
- G. E. Popejoy (51360).
- R. Porter (60259), RAFVR.
- R. Porter (85088), RAFVR.
- W. C. Porter (111166), RAFVR.
- G. G. Potier, DFC, (61244), RAFVR.
- D. G. Potter (44638).
- L. G. Press (117513), RAFVR.
- A. Prince (158537), RAFVR.
- P. E. Prior (144760), RAFVR.
- G. H. Pullan (151496), RAFVR.
- K. F. Pullum (122737), RAFVR.
- P. R. Pumfrey (47290).
- J. C. Rackham (104466), RAFVR.
- K. L. H. Ramsden (126886), RAFVR.
- A. V. Randall (75051), RAFVR.
- A. Rawling (49172).
- A. R. Reeve (87121), RAFVR.
- R. W. Regis (122554), RAFVR.
- J. N. Reid (152361), RAFVR.
- C. J. Rhind (74981), RAFVR.
- F. A. Richards. (132358), RAFVR.
- H. C. Richardson (126585), RAFVR.
- G. B. Rickers (132010), RAFVR.
- J. E. E. Rivalant (134321), RAFVR.
- W. A. Rix (47202).
- F. L. Roberts (76361), RAFVR.
- L. N. Robertson (79697), RAFVR.
- G. D. W. Rogers (86646), RAFVR.
- R. E. Rogerson (109277), RAFVR.
- W. T. E. Rolls, DFC, DFM, (116492), RAFVR.
- A. J. Roper (47028).
- A. S. Ross (152173), RAFVR.
- L. V. Rosser (102241), RAFVR.
- M. Rowan (115032), RAFVR.
- J. C. Rowley (155783), RAFVR.
- C. L. Rubens (63871), RAFVR.
- C. L. Ruffle (115081), RAFVR.
- J. Russell (149524), RAFVR.
- J. S. Russell (100662), RAFVR.
- T. O. Saunders (46772).
- A. L. Sayer (81427), RAFVR.
- R. H. Scott (64980), RAFVR.
- R. H. Sergeant (111777), RAFVR.
- D. W. Shaw (61293), RAFVR.
- P. E. Sheppard (48785).
- A. F. Sherman (147985), RAFVR.
- G. R. D. Sherwell (109933), RAFVR.
- G. H. Simmons (67222), RAFVR.
- E. G. F. Skinner (60472), RAFVR.
- A. Smith (111493), RAFVR.
- K. M. Smith (89947), RAFVR.
- P. Smith. (159536), RAFVR.
- N. N. Parker-Smith (124308), RAFVR.
- P. S. Sidney-Smith (77210), RAFVR.
- R. W. B. Smith (117009), RAFVR.
- E. H. Sneath (85839), RAFVR.
- J. L. Sneddon (143903), RAFVR.
- F. B. Sowrey (107942), RAFVR.
- B. C. Sparrowe (88960), RAFVR.
- E. Speller (112318), RAFVR.
- R. L. Spooner (86761), RAFVR.
- S. B. Spring, DFC, (151009), RAFVR.
- T. O. D. Steel (82051), RAFVR.
- J. C. Steele (150198), RAFVR.
- B. G. Steff (161929), RAFVR.
- E. H. Stewart (90980), RAFVR.
- R. B. Stiles (64241), RAFVR.
- A. P. Strange (83092), RAFVR.
- R. E. W. Stroud (85591), RAFVR.
- R. A. Struthers (151546), RAFVR.
- St. J. Wynell-Sutherland (110566), RAFVR.
- A. J. Talbot (133728), RAFVR.
- D. P. Taylor, DFC, (145913), RAFVR.
- P. N. Taylor (125589), RAFVR.
- W. Taylor (81440), RAFVR.
- I. H. Thomas (129538), RAFVR.
- R. Thomas (147943), RAFVR.
- R. H. C. Thomerson (141715), RAFVR.
- J. C. Thomson (149687), RAFVR.
- H. L. Thorne (121518), RAFVR.
- S. G. Toby (77504), RAFVR.
- C. F. Tomkins (68099), RAFVR.
- J. C. Truscott (49668).
- P. D. Tuckett (90696), AAF.
- H. Tunstall (133207), RAFVR.
- E. Turner (134142), RAFVR.
- G. C. Turner (46760).
- H. J. Turner (115614), RAFVR.
- N. C. Tuxworth (46956).
- R. Tweedy (49000).
- E. H. Tyson (119893), RAFVR.
- J. R. M. Vange (115707), RAFVR.
- S. R. Vickery (130574), RAFVR.
- K. I. Vinall (147199), RAFVR.
- E. F. Waight (159530), RAFVR.
- A. Wake (132387), RAFVR.
- C. L. Walshaw, DFC, (143113), RAFVR.
- C. Warburton (135048), RAFVR.
- D. G. R. Ward (158587), RAFVR.
- B. A. Warrior (135438), RAFVR.
- J. H. Watson (119117), RAFVR.
- W. A. F. Watt (138460), RAFVR.
- E. A. Watts (46864).
- S. D. Way (45976).
- G. H. Webb (63425), RAFVR.
- J. Welch, DFC, (46092),
- A. A. J. Wells (82458), RAFVR.
- D. R. Welsh (157966), RAFVR.
- S. J. Welton (140681), RAFVR.
- R. L. West (123046), RAFVR.
- H. I. Wetherell (87035), RAFVR.
- R. G. E. Wharmby (151043), RAFVR.
- D. K. Wheatley (78966), RAFVR.
- C. B. White (119139), RAFVR.
- W. R. White (85717) RAFVR.
- H. C. Whitehead (110106), RAFVR.
- P. E. Wilder (87945), RAFVR.
- G. E. Wileman (145368), RAFVR.
- J. R. Wilkes (126667), RAFVR.
- A. Williams, DFM, (146694), RAFVR.
- D. Williams (120007), RAFVR.
- D. G. Williams (135620), RAFVR.
- J. H. Williams (84800), RAFVR.
- K. Williams, DFC, (121256), RAFVR.
- R. R. Lloyd-Williams. (82751), RAFVR.
- W. A. Williams (104836), RAFVR.
- H. A. Williamson (87216), RAFVR.
- A. J. Wills (133061), RAFVR.
- F. Wilson (86962), RAFVR.
- K. C. Wilson (162937), RAFVR.
- H. A. Wilton (49627).
- J. Wisdom (124884), RAFVR.
- H. P. Witt (105849), RAFVR.
- E. C. Wood (127106), RAFVR.
- K. Wood (140666), RAFVR.
- W. K. Woods (108086), RAFVR.
- F. L. Wright (113480), RAFVR.
- N. R. Wynn (46214).
- A. T. Wynne (133085), RAFVR.
- A. B. Young (102981), RAFVR.
- G. Young (63825), RAFVR.
- T. F. Young (89505), RAFVR.

Acting Flight Lieutenants

- J. Adshead (142290), RAFVR.
- C. M. C. Albrecht (68329), RAFVR.
- J. D. Anderson (131473), RAFVR.
- W. C. Anderson (135845), RAFVR.
- W. E. Andrew (49848).
- A. T. W. Anslow (119008), RAFVR.
- H. Archer, DFC, (178515), RAFVR.
- R. V. B. Arnaboldi (117298), RAFVR.
- B. Ashdown (51424).
- T. Aspin (49101).
- H. C. Atkinson (157249), RAFVR.
- R. S. Austen (110603), RAFVR.
- J. R. C. Townsend (115909), RAFVR.
- S. Ayers (138953), RAFVR.
- G. H. Trow, DFC, (117012), RAFVR.
- S. L. Ayres (49915).
- T. F. A. Bach (117437), RAFVR.
- S. L. Bacon (142935), RAFVR.
- A. Chleuse-Bairgue (176796), RAFVR.
- W. T. Baker (54013).
- W. C. Ballard (129312), RAFVR.
- C. E. Bannehr (117522), RAFVR.
- E. J. M. Barker (111722), RAFVR,
- W. E. L. Bartley (49187).
- W. W. Barton (105374), RAFVR.
- W. T. C. Bartrop (112691), RAFVR.
- E. G. W. Bassett (113515), RAFVR.
- R. F. Baxter (156134), RAFVR.
- R. W. Beckley, (139452), RAFVR.
- B. Bell (50323).
- T. T. Benson (148576), RAFVR.
- L. D. Bentley (110975), RAFVR.
- J. Berry (168611), RAFVR.
- A. E. Best (172836), RAFVR.
- A. F. Betts (50490).
- A. E. W. Binns (156156), RAFVR.
- J. Blacklaw (145948), RAFVR.
- T. N. Blackmore (111721), RAFVR.
- E. R. Blaine (147838), RAFVR.
- L. R. Blewett (159317), RAFVR.
- J. D. Blythe (145968), RAFVR.
- R. J. Bowman (123722), RAFVR.
- J. F. Boxell (138616), RAFVR.
- D. G. Boyd (146206), RAFVR.
- R. E. Bracher (53365).
- A. G. Bradshaw (147036), RAFVR.
- F. S. Bridges (132133), RAFVR.
- J. Brodie (56056).
- R. Bromley (48187).
- E. Brown (113210), RAFVR.
- N. G. Brown (108349), RAFVR.
- W. H. Brown (175230), RAFVR.
- R. C. Brown (113070), RAFVR.
- A. J. Bryant (53229).
- N. H. Buchanan (121470), RAFVR.
- A. W. H. Bullen (101622), RAFVR.
- S. L. F. Burgess (107556), RAFVR.
- D. Butler (52940).
- J. E. Button, DFM, (53436).
- C. J. Buxton (10747), RAFVR.
- R. M. Campbell (112598), RAFVR.
- J. R. Cannon (144145), RAFVR.
- J. Chartres (47595).
- E. F. Chew (50378).
- D. H. S. Childs (53878).
- B. M. Chilver (111726), RAFVR.
- I. B. Clark (135411), RAFVR.
- C. C. Clarke (51591).
- J. H. B. Clover (113521), RAFVR.
- A. B. B. Coaten (110347), RAFVR.
- W. J. F. Cobb (115679), RAFVR.
- H. Collings (136087), RAFVR.
- L. J. A. Collins (134324), RAFVR.
- C. Connor (112078), RAFVR.
- W. A. G. Cooper (107736), RAFVR.
- D. J. Cotter (183805), RAFVR.
- J. Coulburn (170583), RAFVR.
- A. L. Cowdry (105702), RAFVR.
- G. A. Cowling (140524), RAFVR.
- W. N. Craddock (172659), RAFVR.
- C. A. Crews (124984), RAFVR.
- P. W. K. Crisp, DFM, (51582).
- H. Crockford (51761).
- F. D. Croney, DFC, (175728), RAFVR.
- A. W. Crook (126724), RAFVR.
- G. A. Crook (49374).
- K. B. Crosby (156530), RAFVR.
- E. W. Crowe (121650), RAFVR.
- R. P. Curtis (103709), RAFVR.
- T. W. Dales (143608), RAFVR.
- H. J. Davidson (113147), RAFVR.
- A. A. Day (156169), RAFVR.
- R. J. F. Day (112091), RAFVR.
- W. Dickson (48236).
- H. Dootson (149259), RAFVR.
- J. L. Down (47922).
- K. W. Drake (141616), RAFVR.
- R. R. Duly (51949).
- F. W. Dunn (184324), RAFVR.
- T. D. D. Dunn, DFC, (115306), RAFVR.
- A. J. Dunsford (114256), RAFVR.
- H. F. Dyer (103165), RAFVR.
- J. S. Eacott (104144), RAFVR.
- R. S. Eckersley (139459), RAFVR.
- A. W. Elliott (134600), RAFVR.
- A. F. Evans (113975), RAFVR.
- C. O. Evans (141807), RAFVR.
- J. H. Evans (51930).
- L. E. I. Evans (112106), RAFVR.
- F. Fallon (49433).
- C. Farman (51931).
- A. R. Fasham (111399), RAFVR.
- T. J. Fendick (139093), RAFVR.
- M. Ferguson (106923), RAFVR.
- N. H. Ferguson (110356), RAFVR.
- R. J. Fisher (125373), RAFVR.
- P. T. Fitzgerald (110357), RAFVR.
- G. W. R. Frampton (124953), RAFVR.
- A. Fraser (48675).
- D. K. Fraser (74258), RAFVR.
- C. V. French (151308), RAFVR.
- E. H. Fuller (49974), RAFVR.
- A. R. Fullerton (172668), RAFVR.
- D. C. Fyfe (86363), RAFVR.
- D. H. Garratt (148212), RAFVR.
- H. G. Gauntlett (50165), RAFVR.
- C. W. Cell (68972), RAFVR.
- R. G. Gleave (159349), RAFVR.
- F. J. Glover (148041), RAFVR.
- R. A. J. Goode, DFM, (121506), RAFVR.
- B. A. Goodman (147869), RAFVR.
- G. A. Graham, MBE, (50423).
- D. J. Green (156108), RAFVR.
- J. H. Griffin (148216), RAFVR.
- N. J. Groome (135843), RAFVR.
- A. E. Grover (46853).
- W. S. Hacking (110232), RAFVR.
- H. Haddow (148205), RAFVR.
- H. S. Hall (141428), RAFVR.
- H. S. Hallett (50647).
- L. S. Hallett (156216), RAFVR.
- S. Hancock (139315), RAFVR.
- G. T. Hands (50982).
- A. H. Handy (63131), RAFVR.
- D. P. Hanney (103772), RAFVR.
- H. W. Harding (177356), RAFVR.
- W. A. Harrison (52525).
- E. T. Hawley (62061), RAFVR.
- W. T. Haxby, DFC, (135038), RAFVR.
- W. Heaton (50870).
- W. A. G. Herbert (144093), RAFVR.
- J. W. Hendry (135863), RAFVR.
- H. G. Herd (107210), RAFVR.
- P. J. Hewitt (120977), RAFVR.
- S. G. Heywood (137873), RAFVR.
- J. S. Higginson (107209), RAFVR.
- E. F. Higham (53590)
- A. Hood (131688), RAFVR.
- R. W. Hornall, DFC, (156113), RAFVR.
- R. B. Hosking, DFM, (51084).
- G. I. Howell (67636), RAFVR.
- R. D. Hughes (111440), RAFVR.
- D. Humphery (134592), RAFVR.
- E. W. Hunter (105478), RAFVR.
- A. C. Husband (161545), RAFVR.
- A. E. Huson (143535), RAFVR.
- E. A. Ingroville (50392), RAFVR.
- A. Jackson (89923), RAFVR.
- P. H. Johns (48203).
- F. L. B. Johnson (113196), RAFVR.
- A. V. Jones (68971), RAFVR.
- J. H. A. Jones (102711), RAFVR.
- S. T. P. Jones (52193).
- E. G. Keep (176838), RAFVR.
- D. P. Kelly (51256).
- F. W. Kennedy (49463).
- L. H. G. Kent (127233), RAFVR.
- L. A. King (89217), RAFVR.
- C. T. S. King (105347), RAFVR.
- R. H. Kitley (134267), RAFVR.
- J. Knight (125864), RAFVR.
- R. B. Laurie (109676), RAFVR.
- A. H. Lawley, (145604), RAFVR.
- J. T. Lawrence (117726), RAFVR.
- C. G. Leplar (172669), RAFVR.
- T. Lindley (169770), RAFVR.
- J. W. Lloyd (117537), RAFVR.
- J. V. Longley (105920), RAFVR.
- N. Longstaffe (158528), RAFVR.
- W. T. Lord (84796), RAFVR.
- J. O. Lupton (103855), RAFVR.
- L. D. Mabey (183152), RAFVR.
- J. McGrath (67160), RAFVR.
- W. C. Macintyre (139763), RAFVR.
- J. A. McKenna (115297), RAFVR.
- A. MacMilland (104802), RAFVR.
- W. F. McMillan (112868), RAFVR.
- T. B. McMillan (112869), RAFVR.
- D. MacQueen (8,7530), RAFVR.
- H. R. Manfield (112362), RAFVR.
- S. L. Manfield (49155).
- G. A. T. Marlow (141107), RAFVR.
- W. Martin (49505).
- H. L. Mason (161182), RAFVR.
- R. L. Mason (158196), RAFVR.
- B. L. Masters (101695), RAFVR.
- J. H. Mears (111004), RAFVR.
- F. N. S. Melland (106905), RAFVR.
- W. M. Messenger (132497), RAFVR.
- C. J. H. Meyers (54021).
- J. Miles (170447), RAFVR.
- K. V. Miles (51466).
- W. H. Minshall (145994), RAFVR.
- R. P. W. Mitchell (109570), RAFVR.
- H. F. D. Monk (65320), RAFVR.
- J. R. Moorhouse, DFC, (109342), RAFVR.
- G. P. Morley (79946), RAFVR.
- A. Morris (53394).
- D. J. H. Morrison (121819), RAFVR.
- A. G. Naysmith (47198).
- A. E. Newland (106904), RAFVR.
- A. R. Newman (48308).
- J. S. Newman (51474).
- D. C. Nott, DFC, (171391), RAFVR.
- L. C. Ockenden (87281), RAFVR.
- F. Ogley (155713), RAFVR.
- H. P. H. Owen (117268), RAFVR.
- W. K. Owen, DFM, (53677).
- T. N. Parkin (50433).
- J. C. Parkinson (100151), RAFVR
- K. E. J. Patfteld (175801). RAFVR.
- S. A. Patterson, DFM, (51653).
- C. W. F. Payne (105559), RAFVR.
- S. W. Peall (145577), RAFVR.
- G. E. Pearce (135841), RAFVR.
- W. S. Pearcey (110036), RAFVR.
- L. H. Pearman (138994), RAFVR.
- G. E. Pentley (50058).
- L. Perring (54141).
- R. R. Pethard (134892), RAFVR.
- A. H. L. Peters (165496), RAFVR.
- E. J. Phillips, DFC, (130236), RAFVR.
- C. L. Philps (118111), RAFVR.
- L. Pickup (114018), RAFVR.
- J. R. Pilbin (112223), RAFVR.
- T. F. Pilcher (106897), RAFVR.
- J. Pitman (107889), RAFVR.
- A. F. S. Pollock (113577), RAFVR.
- R. D. Polwarth (53141).
- A. R. Ponsford (156196), RAFVR.
- F. G. Popham (144508), RAFVR.
- F. M. Potter (142211), RAFVR.
- R. Powis (186461), RAFVR.
- J. Preston (50431).
- R. A. Preston (148074), RAFVR.
- N. H. Price (106339), RAFVR.
- B. B. Pugh (114021), RAFVR.
- C. L. G. Puncher (49911).
- S. H. Putnam (113233), RAFVR.
- A. Race (101704), RAFVR.
- B. A. Radcliffe (110489), RAFVR.
- R. W. Raisbeck (173009), RAFVR.
- W. J. Randall (141952), RAFVR.
- W. G. Raggatt (121700), RAFVR.
- W. Reay (112229) RAFVR.
- R. A. Reed (134235), RAFVR.
- W. C. Rees (52976).
- G. Reid (117224), RAFVR.
- G. R. Butt-Reed (169765), RAFVR.
- J. W. Reynolds (147372), RAFVR.
- C. W. Rhodes (137077), RAFVR.
- C. A. Riceman (108976), RAFVR.
- F. Roberts (158877), RAFVR.
- D. L. Robertson (108604), RAFVR.
- J. F. Robertson (116489), RAFVR.
- L. F. Robins (157468), RAFVR.
- R. W. Robinson (157765), RAFVR.
- J. C. Rolfe (119054), RAFVR.
- S. R. Rose (185080), RAFVR.
- E. Rowbotham (51423).
- B. R. Rowden (112846), RAFVR.
- R. K. Rowntree (109450), RAFVR.
- C. M. Ruck (111013), RAFVR.
- I. Rudd (51398).
- D. H. Rushworth (115036), RAFVR.
- H. J. Ryder (145955), RAFVR.
- T. R. I. R. Sanceau (142963), RAFVR.
- L. C. Savage (144908), RAFVR.
- H. Schofield (155730), RAFVR.
- G. Scott (56425).
- W. A. Scott (119062), RAFVR.
- E. Shelley (170144), RAFVR.
- L. A. G. Simons (105953), RAFVR.
- S. M. Shimeld (132104), RAFVR.
- R. T. Hargrave-Silk (118820), RAFVR.
- T. Simpson (52985).
- R. M. Singer (123819), RAFVR.
- F. G. Sivyer (113467), RAFVR.
- E. A. Sleigh (49256).
- A. R. Smallwood (68966), RAFVR.
- H. E. Smead (159296), RAFVR.
- N. B. Smethurst (147027), RAFVR.
- T. Smart, DFC, (155578), RAFVR.
- G. H. Smith (139269), RAFVR.
- H. Y. Smith (161881), RAFVR.
- J. A. Smith (107190), RAFVR.
- N. F. Smith (135832), RAFVR.
- R. K. Smith (117833), RAFVR.
- T. K. Smith (146192), RAFVR.
- P. T. G. Snasdell (176119), RAFVR.
- W. Snell (119990), RAFVR.
- N. Spencer (113290), RAFVR.
- W. R. Spencer (118311), RAFVR.
- W. R. Stansfield (117895), RAFVR.
- G. Stanton (131701), RAFVR.
- A. W. B. Stewart (60597), RAFVR.
- G. F. Stewart (117230), RAFVR.
- S. Stewart (54396).
- E. W. Stockdale (120611), RAFVR.
- H. C. Stocks (48915).
- T. H. J. Stovold (139470), RAFVR.
- W. Strang (146002), RAFVR.
- H. Street (49677).
- H. L. R. Summers (100780), RAFVR.
- J. E. Summers (176145), RAFVR.
- W. Swan (53543).
- T. P. Swanson (62467), RAFVR.
- B. W. Taylor (149775), RAFVR.
- E. F. Taylor (109152), RAFVR.
- W. C. Taylor (49413).
- C. S. Thomas (49882).
- S. C.Thomas (142253), RAFVR.
- F. Thompson (110011), RAFVR.
- J. C. F. Thompson (110010), RAFVR.
- J. D. H. Thomson (136970), RAFVR.
- J. W. Thomson (145350), RAFVR.
- W. D. Thomson (146197), RAFVR.
- J. C. Thurston (136984), RAFVR.
- J. O. Tomlinson (138984), RAFVR.
- O. H. Tordoff (149776), RAFVR.
- C. S. Tucker (47007).
- A. G. Tullock (113251), RAFVR.
- C. Turl (158467), RAFVR.
- H. T. Turner (105615), RAFVR.
- J. Turner (112824), RAFVR.
- L. N. Tutt (158870), RAFVR.
- B. W. V. Tytherleigh (101729), RAFVR.
- R. H. Unkles (125404), RAFVR.
- R. W. Usher (117817,), RAFVR.
- C. H. Vickerman (109454), RAFVR.
- R. F. Vigurs (122020), RAFVR.
- K. J. H. Vinall (115072), RAFVR.
- J. Vodvarka (107633), RAFVR.
- J. Walden (109543), RAFVR.
- J. H. Walker (129273), RAFVR.
- F. W. W. Wallace (158397), RAFVR.
- H. J. Wallace (115059), RAFVR.
- S. P. Wand (48043).
- B. J. Ware (143812), RAFVR.
- J. H. Warne (110291), RAFVR.
- B. W. M. Warner (113471), RAFVR.
- A. H. Waters (113112), RAFVR.
- J. M. Waters (52230).
- E. W. Watkins (123906), RAFVR.
- G. W. Watkins (60265), RAFVR.
- F. Waye (145646), RAFVR.
- F. E. R. Webb (48347).
- J. F. Whalley (135810), RAFVR.
- F. K. Wheatley (103120), RAFVR.
- C. White (144840), RAFVR.
- J. B. White (137786), RAFVR.
- J. G. White (146473), RAFVR.
- K. H. W. White (111463), RAFVR.
- C. H. Wicks (50813).
- R. C. Wilcox (107183), RAFVR.
- F. H. J. Wilkins (137042), RAFVR.
- T. Williams (110602), RAFVR.
- W. G. Williams (114101), RAFVR.
- L. H. Willson (120720), RAFVR.
- C. M. Wolstenholme (117881), RAFVR.
- D. P. Wood (146736), RAFVR.
- S. Wood (144378), RAFVR.
- D. A. S. Woodbridge (51422).
- H. G. Woods (109403), RAFVR.
- G. Wren (161956), RAFVR.
- A. G. Wright (145271), RAFVR.
- R. H. Wurr (139451), RAFVR.
- J. Wyatt (121476), RAFVR.
- R. A. Wyatt (141185), RAFVR.
- J. C. Young (49527).

Flying Officers

- H. W. Adams (51547), RAFVR.
- J. A. Adams (178704), RAFVR.
- R. C. T. Adams (105221), RAFVR.
- G. S. Aitken (160835), RAFVR.
- B. R. Allen (145946), RAFVR.
- B. Allison (145187), RAFVR.
- F. Allison (178661), RAFVR.
- C. E. Allso (172844), RAFVR.
- J. M. Anderson (195175), RAFVR.
- R. J. H. Ansley (54861).
- G. G. Atkinson (49896).
- T. S. Atkinson (173622). RAFVR.
- W. T. Atkinson (184460), RAFVR.
- A. D. Austen (177431), RAFVR.
- K. J. Ayrton (168821), RAFVR.
- G. D. Bain (161481), RAFVR.
- P. S. Ballantine (177916), RAFVR.
- H. A. Barnes (160697), RAFVR.
- R. Bebbington (168864), RAFVR.
- A. L. Bedford (174959), RAFVR.
- E. Bedford (186416), RAFVR.
- F. Bellam (50831).
- R. F. A. Bennett (51354).
- C. E. F. Benzon (176099), RAFVR.
- B. R. C. Bessell (54882).
- E. C. Bieri (162832), RAFVR.
- O. L. Bigland (148228), RAFVR.
- A. H. Billam (186291), RAFVR.
- A. E. Bladon (170991), RAFVR.
- J. B. Blake (190061), RAFVR.
- C. J. Bleakley (162834), RAFVR.
- J. O. Bower (196199), RAFVR.
- A. T. Boyton (175446), RAFVR.
- R. W. Bradbury (183889), RAFVR.
- G. H. Brown (114719), RAFVR.
- A. F. Bryant (53410).
- A. L. Bryant (190192). RAFVR.
- J. Bryars (158153), RAFVR.
- D. M. Bryden (171286), RAFVR.
- V. A. Bunting (195389), RAFVR.
- K. Butler (188524), RAFVR.
- C. H. T. Cables (190232), RAFVR.
- A. A. Campbell (184369), RAFVR.
- I. A. Campbell (185858), RAFVR.
- E. Candy (176726), RAFVR.
- W. A. Cann (51436).
- G. Carey (179406), RAFVR.
- G. Carpenter (179628), RAFVR.
- D. T. Carter (178774), RAFVR.
- W. J. Catterall (122103), RAFVR.
- P. B. Caunt (140117), RAFVR.
- C. G. J. Challis (173947), RAFVR.
- A. A. Chapman (113143), RAFVR.
- G. B. L. Chivers (140810), RAFVR.
- C. G. Clarke (54805), RAFVR.
- R. F. Clarke (173106), RAFVR.
- A. T. Cleare (52927).
- R. F. Clement (178055), RAFVR.
- H. C. Clifford (170097), RAFVR.
- G. D. Coates (144109), RAFVR.
- E. C. G. Collins (124966), RAFVR.
- H. W. Collyer (54881).
- C. H. Cooper (147564), RAFVR.
- C. C. H. Cornhill (136638), RAFVR.
- L. I. Coulstock (176403), RAFVR.
- N. Cox (139068), RAFVR.
- V. L Creasey (125409), RAFVR.
- A. F. Crekillie (154006), RAFVR.
- K. B. Croker (128836), RAFVR
- R. A. Cutt (469283), RAFVR.
- D. F. Blackburne-Daniell (132481), RAFVR.
- D. R. Darter (177342), RAFVR.
- F. Davidson (136099), RAFVR.
- R. H. Davis (195639), RAFVR.
- L. J. Day (164270), RAFVR.
- L. Dean (119432), RAFVR.
- E. K. Dinneen (54608).
- C. V. Dove (1161753), RAFVR.
- H. J. M. Dowling (195360), RAFVR
- J. E. Dowling (53129).
- E. Drysdale (162753), RAFVR.
- R. Drysdale (139794), RAFVR.
- N. Earnshaw (174871), RAFVR.
- S. Ecroyd (165497), RAFVR.
- J. T. Edge (131510), RAFVR.
- G. A. Elder (183451), RAFVR.
- E. Evans (61615), RAFVR.
- G. F. Evans (132649), RAFVR.
- R. Everett (174048), RAFVR.
- A. Ewart (173215), RAFVR.
- J. J. Feesey (137789), RAFVR.
- M. O. Felix (129099), RAFVR.
- C. H. Fellows, (158219), RAFVR.
- R. N. Fenn (164472), RAFVR.
- W. D. Fernie (185253), RAFVR.
- R. G. Findlay (140115), RAFVR.
- H. Fishwick (51862).
- E. Foote (159304), RAFVR.
- D. G. Ford (182256), RAFVR.
- F. Ford (133287), RAFVR.
- J. K. Foster (186755), RAFVR.
- R. A. Foster (51585).
- D. W. Fox (140129), RAFVR.
- E. J. Foyle (187980), RAFVR.
- S. C. Frazer (190385), RAFVR.
- H. A. Freeman (156493), RAFVR.
- T. French (164852), RAFVR.
- B. M. Gahagan (109624), RAFVR.
- G. H. Bamble (175137), RAFVR.
- J. E. Garner (105431), RAFVR.
- D. H. Gatchell (160183), RAFVR.
- R. J. Gibbons (48034).
- T. F. Giles (169237), RAFVR.
- H. N. Gill (169227), RAFVR.
- K. Gill (158555), RAFVR.
- T. H. Gill (162519), RAFVR.
- R. A. Gleeson (189123), RAFVR.
- F. J. Golding (144304), RAFVR.
- D. T. Gooding (158177), RAFVR.
- S. Gordon (152976), RAFVR.
- J. G. Graham (157886), RAFVR.
- B. C. G. Gray (133290), RAFVR.
- G. G. K. Gray (168688), RAFVR.
- S. W. Green (182217), RAFVR.
- S. F. Greenwood (140019), RAFVR.
- T. M. Griffiths (178297), RAFVR.
- G. H. Griggs, AFM, (184823), RAFVR.
- G. D. Grimsdell (144100), RAFVR.
- L. G. E. Grover (156278), RAFVR.
- A. J. Gudge (152575), RAFVR.
- L. A. Guile (140025), RAFVR.
- D. M. Hall (133906), RAFVR.
- J. G. Hamilton (159032), RAFVR.
- W. G. Handley (100208), RAFVR.
- A. J. Hanmore (195169), RAFVR.
- B. T. Hardie (170106), RAFVR.
- A. J. Harding (135950), RAFVR.
- A. C. Hardy (189062), RAFVR.
- B. S. Hardy (189855), RAFVR.
- G. R. Hardy (173385), RAFVR.
- A. Hargreaves (139772), RAFVR.
- S. W. Hargreaves (127605), RAFVR.
- G. W. Harris (190820), RAFVR.
- R. A. Harris (54016).
- A. E. Harrison (145601), RAFVR.
- G. A. Harrison (50270).
- R. E. Harwood (171673), RAFVR.
- N. V. O. O. Haveland (177956), RAFVR.
- T. P. M. Hawes (179343), RAFVR.
- L. J. S. Hawkins (182688), RAFVR.
- M. H. Hawkins (174889), RAFVR.
- K. M. Hayes (191663), RAFVR.
- E. T. Hayter (108706), RAFVR.
- N. W. N. Hayter (169822), RAFVR.
- J. L. H. Heagerty (161733), RAFVR.
- R. J. Hedley (149425), RAFVR.
- I. H. W. Herrick (161326), RAFVR.
- T. Hetherington (187935), RAFVR.
- O. L. Hewitt (160854), RAFVR.
- J. H. C. Hill (164043), RAFVR.
- W. C. Hillier (117681), RAFVR. (deceased).
- H. Chadwick-Hindley (139266), RAFVR.
- F. J. Hobbs (164656), RAFVR.
- D. F. Holden (196284), RAFVR.
- W. G. Hood, DFM, (179142), RAFVR.
- S. Horne (154549), RAFVR.
- H. E. de C. Howard (143827), RAFVR.
- J. H. Hubbard (114292), RAFVR.
- L. W. Hull (103799), RAFVR.
- S. Hunt (50914).
- W. J. Hutchings (178329), RAFVR.
- W. E. B. Hurst (50653).
- W. B. Hullah (140305), RAFVR.
- G. J. Hulbert (111215), RAFVR.
- J. A. Inglis (126627), RAFVR.
- G. R. B. Ingram (127617), RAFVR.
- W. H. Jackson (182956), RAFVR.
- J. M. James (187057), RAFVR.
- B. E. Jannaway (144891), RAFVR.
- A. Jefferson (51564).
- E. A. Johnson (185827), RAFVR.
- B. Jodidijo (157223), RAFVR.
- B. C. Johnson (49433).
- C. Johnson (13788), RAFVR
- H. V. W. C. Jones (45791).
- L. J. Jones (133288), RAFVR.
- P. G. Jordan (188443), RAFVR.
- R. Keast (136975), RAFVR.
- H. J. H. Keay (47759)
- N. J. Keeble (147441), RAFVR.
- W. N. Kemp (54352).
- F. S. Kilshawe (134637), RAFVR.
- L. J. Keating (119518), RAFVR.
- H. J. Keen (186966), RAFVR.
- P. J. Keirle-Simpson (171158), RAFVR.
- L. M. Kerr (137887), RAFVR.
- S. Kilburn (145936), RAFVR.
- R. T. Lawrence (68212), RAFVR.
- W. T. Lawston (190246), RAFVR.
- P. N. Lee (185008), RAFVR.
- T. W. Lennard (51569).
- T. H. Lewis (133905), RAFVR.
- W. O. Lewis (191477), RAFVR.
- R. H. Leyland (52003).
- H. C. Liley (174364), RAFVR.
- C. F. Lloyd (177450), RAFVR.
- L. G. Lloyd (125378), RAFVR.
- R. D. Lloyd (54269).
- F. S. Long (148677), RAFVR.
- C. E. Love (135184), RAFVR.
- C. E. Lucas (125913), RAFVR.
- J. A. Macdonald (113157), RAFVR.
- D. C. McGillivray (139186), RAFVR.
- D. S. MacKenzie (175866), RAFVR.
- I. MacLachlan (138951), RAFVR.
- D. R. Mallett (164222), RAFVR.
- J. V. Mallock (160252), RAFVR.
- R. L. Manning (189131), RAFVR.
- P. G. Marman (183953), RAFVR.
- F. E. Marriott (170845), RAFVR.
- R. Mather (123801), RAFVR.
- F. W. May (178144), RAFVR.
- J. A. R. Mead (102769), RAFVR.
- W. J. Mepham (159575), RAFVR.
- A. R. D. Mitchell (196247), RAFVR.
- J. R. Mitchinson (139774), RAFVR.
- J. Moniham (160633), RAFVR.
- C. G. Monk, DFC, (178312), RAFVR.
- H. Mordecai (147264), RAFVR.
- J. S. Morris (132177), RAFVR.
- T. D. Morrow (172511), RAFVR.
- A. S. Morton (137846), RAFVR.
- P. A. M. Moseley (158020), RAFVR.
- F. P. Moseley (157656), RAFVR.
- M. O. Mott (121606), RAFVR.
- R. A. R. Moule (184872), RAFVR.
- W. A. Muir (190930), RAFVR.
- W. J. D. Muir (55259)
- J. A. Mullins (145881), RAFVR.
- C. B. Mulvey (156847), RAFVR.
- W. A. Munn (177803), RAFVR.
- A. C. Munns (157663), RAFVR.
- J. H. Murgatroyd (161129), RAFVR.
- W. B. Murray (54124).
- W. S. Murray (149275), RAFVR.
- R. Naismith (189215), RAFVR.
- G. A. Naldrett (186573), RAFVR.
- K. E. Neill (156279), RAFVR.
- W. Noble (131714), RAFVR.
- W. C. Noble (156188), RAFVR.
- E. H. R. North (163981), RAFVR.
- Sir C. H. Nugent, Bt. (179120), RAFVR.
- J. O'Reilly (143314), RAFVR.
- W. A. T. Palfrey (168986), RAFVR.
- T. H. Palmer (159609), RAFVR.
- J. G. Parkinson (186385), RAFVR.
- S. Parkinson (138581), RAFVR.
- R. W. F. Parmiter (162699), RAFVR.
- A. E. Penfold (157444), RAFVR.
- S. S. Pennington, DFC, (179514), RAFVR.
- T. B. Perks (146512), RAFVR.
- S. C. Pigden (186933), RAFVR.
- C. H. Piper (158874), RAFVR.
- W. A. B. Pithie (88368), RAFVR.
- S. Poole (154326), RAFVR.
- W. R. Pountney (147244), RAFVR.
- G. C. Pretsell (171369), RAFVR.
- F. H. Price (50408).
- P. A. Rankin (158737), RAFVR.
- D. W. Reading (101119), RAFVR.
- L. W. Recordon (64212), RAFVR.
- E. Redhead (187722), RAFVR.
- A. C. Reid (185273), RAFVR.
- C. A. Reid (115890), RAFVR.
- G. A. Rich (176737), RAFVR.
- E. A. Riches (109477), RAFVR.
- E. J. Roe (138562), RAFVR.
- G. S. Rollings (137953), RAFVR.
- W. Rollinson (129997), RAFVR.
- J. Rothwell (50862).
- C. R. Russell (118594), RAFVR.
- G. M. Russell (173698), RAFVR.
- J. H. Russell (154025), RAFVR.
- T. Russell (175761), RAFVR.
- J. E. Ryan (158605), RAFVR.
- R. B. Sampson (54323).
- R. T. C. Satterford (53048).
- R. Satterthwaite (141267), RAFVR.
- C. Saunders (170188), RAFVR.
- R. P. Saunders (137956), RAFVR.
- J. A. Scardifield (141488), RAFVR.
- J. R. Scott (123085), RAFVR.
- W. Scrivens (119944), RAFVR.
- F. T. Sellers. (172613), RAFVR.
- J. W. Semmens (174903), RAFVR.
- C. Senior (135814), RAFVR.
- W. Sharrock (157968), RAFVR.
- A. G. Sheldon (136486), RAFVR.
- C. E. Simpson (148606), RAFVR.
- R. G. Sixsmith (123675), RAFVR.
- S. D. Slade (188301), RAFVR.
- E. R. Slee (81728), RAFVR.
- C. Smaje (52405).
- A. M. J. Smith (191424), RAFVR.
- D. W. Smith (187799), RAFVR.
- E. A. W. Smith (191525), RAFVR.
- H. Smith (190375), RAFVR.
- K. Smith, D.E.C. (176770), RAFVR.
- M. J. Smith (172723), RAFVR.
- R. T. Smith (51488).
- T. Smith (176734), RAFVR.
- W. J. Smith (161619), RAFVR.
- K. J. Spargo (179770), RAFVR.
- G. A. Stafford, AFC, (158301), RAFVR.
- R. Staveley (184120), RAFVR.
- L. H. Stewart (61202), RAFVR.
- V. G. Strong (141257), RAFVR.
- A. Stuart (191117), RAFVR.
- H. W. Sutton (153137), RAFVR.
- J. Swallow (170250), RAFVR.
- A. K. Sykes (149774), RAFVR.
- J. H. Tainsh (153880), RAFVR.
- F. T. Tatlow (161513), RAFVR.
- A. B. Taunt (170502), RAFVR.
- E. J. Temple (175468), RAFVR.
- E. H. Thomas (155720), RAFVR.
- W. G. Thomas (52742).
- E. Thomason (159707), RAFVR.
- A. J. Thompson (173392), RAFVR.
- D. P. Thompson (185120), RAFVR.
- R. S. Thompson (162783), RAFVR.
- N. R. Tritton (140085), RAFVR.
- C. D. Tyler (168664), RAFVR.
- R. R. Vale (139442), RAFVR.
- E. L. Vigar. (177151), RAFVR.
- T. Wallace (81187), RAFVR.
- J. P. Walsh. (182886), RAFVR.
- H. L. Welsby (146777), RAFVR.
- C. H. Westhead (53027).
- S. Weston (175827), RAFVR.
- P. De V. Wetherall (146516), RAFVR.
- H. A. Whiley (169840), RAFVR.
- H. F. H. Whitfeld (105633), RAFVR.
- J. H. Wickson (173001), RAFVR.
- E. W. Wiggington (119960), RAFVR.
- J. R. B. Wild, MC, (134955), RAFVR.
- L. Wilder (190657), RAFVR.
- J. F. Wilkinson (146008), RAFVR.
- C. E. Williams, DFC, (182344), RAFVR.
- R. M. Williams (67231), RAFVR.
- S. C. Willis (162011), RAFVR.
- J. W. E. Wills (179757), RAFVR.
- D. R. Wiseman (172218), RAFVR.
- J. A. P. Withers (53685).
- A. Woollacott (88047), RAFVR.
- A. I. Wyborn (181065), RAFVR.
- G. H. Yorke (129682), RAFVR.
- L. D. Young (139805), RAFVR.

Acting Flying Officers

- C. Gregory (89836), RAFVR.
- A. J. Smith (191527), RAFVR.

Pilot Officers

- G. Adams (187726), RAFVR (deceased).
- J. Beattie (198008), RAFVR.
- D. F. Dowdall (196917), RAFVR.
- H. Graham (196621), RAFVR.
- W. R. H. Green (196075), RAFVR.
- A. G. Grice (196826), RAFVR.
- J. E. E. Isabel (196218), RAFVR.
- J. Longden (184019), RAFVR.
- A. A. Macbean (197476), RAFVR.
- J. S. Madgett (196089), RAFVR.
- K. W. Mitchell (172974), RAFVR (deceased).
- H. M. J. Smith (191782), RAFVR.
- G. Whitehouse (196093), RAFVR.

Warrant Officers

- J. F. Agutter (560010).
- G. Allman (510290).
- J. I. Alexander (591030).
- J. Anderson (355007).
- W. Anderson (517595).
- W. D. Andrews (363353).
- J. Angus (355281).
- S. Armitage (509932).
- J. R. Auton (563515)
- E. T. Baker (327422).
- R. S. Baker (1445400), RAFVR.
- G. H. Barker (512719).
- C. T. Barnes (350411).
- J. Bateson (550830).
- F. B. Beaumont (239583).
- C. J. I. Bell (359971).
- R. Bennet (538158).
- L. W. Bennett (514313).
- W. A. Bennett (366026).
- A. Blair (513890).
- L. J. Blumsum (656475).
- E. L. Boskett (513496).
- D. Boulsover (1126338), RAFVR.
- J. D. Bradford (508352).
- L. Bradford (915646), RAFVR
- W. C. C. Braines (590327).
- P. Braithwaite (347870).
- G. C. R. Brookes (370928).
- F. D. L. Brown (362828).
- H. E. Brown (1271069), RAFVR.
- N. L. Brown (932519), RAFVR.
- R. M. Brown (531249).
- R. G. Budden (1187502), RAFVR.
- K. Butterworth (1050688), RAFVR.
- A. Callander (334740).
- N. Cameron (755392), RAFVR.
- F. E. Carey (1463204), RAFVR.
- G. W. Brooker-Carey (517471).
- A. G. Carrington (1245534), RAFVR.
- R. Carter (345788).
- W. R. Channon (364549).
- L. T. Chambers (1188493), RAFVR.
- W. M. Childs (344687).
- W. H. Christie (515700).
- R. H. Church (645414).
- C. W. Clark (517240).
- F. Clay (513835).
- D. P. Clifton (1458107), RAFVR.
- H. Clinton (1554542), RAFVR.
- G. W. T. Coates (1405592), RAFVR.
- H. J. Collins (1330166), RAFVR.
- S. T. Condick (2434).
- D. A. Cooper (516271).
- B. Cornell (752711), RAFVR.
- J. J. Concannon (1506938), RAFVR.
- G. Coupland (1065323), RAFVR.
- J. H. Cove (505194).
- L. H. Crate (1585708), RAFVR.
- R. A. Crimes (979831), RAFVR.
- L. J. Cross (329843), RAFVR.
- L. E. C. Croucher (945874), RAFVR.
- W. E. Culley (614856).
- A. E. R. Cunningham (362848).
- D. R. Cunningham (540688).
- R. Cunningham (352703).
- N. Davies (1232003), RAFVR.
- M. Davis (1376717), RAFVR.
- S. H. Day (361938).
- R. Day (930930), RAFVR.
- R. C. Dent (359091).
- A. Dickinson (508401).
- T. Dixon (332633).
- P. W. Dodwell (591039).
- L. C. Doughty (935786), RAFVR.
- J. H. Drew (356156).
- J. M. Duff (816043), RAFVR.
- H. R. Durbridge (514887).
- C. Durrett (519552).
- R. D. Easton (363912).
- E. Eatough (997901), RAFVR.
- A. England (362893).
- E. G. Evans (1031140), RAFVR.
- L. Falkingham (511761).
- A. C. Finch (1583716), RAFVR.
- W. Flood (363586).
- S. L. Forster (1107246), RAFVR.
- E. Fortune (1396356), RAFVR.
- J. A. Foster (590613).
- S. C. Pot (363580).
- T. W. Francis (512393).
- N. C. Galloway (515391).
- L. R. Garrett (1280762), RAFVR.
- S. G. Gaskin (26126).
- R. W. Gatfield (590097).
- M. Gelbhauer (1270361), RAFVR.
- G. S. George (513871).
- C. H. Goodwin (1376144).
- J. H. Gray (335147).
- E. G. H. Green (1331624), RAFVR.
- R. G. Greenfield (157164), RAFVR.
- R. M. Gullage (798664), RAFVR.
- R. Gurnham (1384336), RAFVR.
- A. J. Gurr (1311296), RAFVR.
- J. C. Guy. (359278).
- J. E. Haden (507134).
- G. V. Halliday (518323,)
- G. J. Hannon (1385513) RAFVR.
- S. M. Harding (1161019), RAFVR.
- E. Harrison (560288).
- E. P. Hartey (328484).
- F. L. Hartridge (513348).
- L. L. Harvey (359841).
- W. A. Harvey (1313447), RAFVR.
- A. G. Heaver (514638).
- C. J. F. Higgs (366135).
- G. Hird (1062395), RAFVR.
- J. C. Holliday (565227).
- G. Hollingworth (351072).
- J. W. Hosking (561146).
- C. H. Hoskins (362964).
- T. W. A. How (509828).
- J. D. Howells (1530990), RAFVR.
- E. C. Ibbott (514298).
- H. J. Innocent (560170).
- L. J. S. Jackson (565596).
- D. G. Jarvis (1392467), RAFVR.
- G. T. Jeary (590440).
- J. A. Jenkin (345393).
- F. Johnstone (366127).
- J. U. Johnstone (511894).
- E. C. Juffs, MBE, (366133).
- H. Kelsey (351393).
- H. Kendall (364122).
- J. D. Kilgour (330177).
- W. E. Kipling (510363).
- N. J. Kirkman (811197).
- T. R. Lacey (846050), RAFVR.
- R. E. Lancaster (348989).
- A. S. Laycock (656231).
- L. G. Ledingham (520776).
- E. G. Leece (518236).
- A. Lewis (1128103), RAFVR.
- T. Little (525909).
- H. T. Lloyd (245159).
- K. G. Loach (1322393), RAFVR.
- C. T. Lord (349266).
- L. H. Lovett (357589).
- W. A. Loxley (350003).
- A. J. Macaskill (590339).
- R. W. Macaskill (560677).
- D. H. MacKenzie (518007).
- R. J. Mackie (803364), RAFVR.
- J. A. Mackintosh (363191).
- K. McLean (1149354), RAFVR.
- A. B. McLeod (370009).
- K. P. Maingot (605475).
- J. G. Manning (560497).
- J. Manton (363010).
- J. Manton (564256).
- L. W. Marr (349360).
- F. W. Mason (1387706), RAFVR.
- D. Matheson (1365789), RAFVR.
- R. J. Matthews (516223).
- H. Melia (507220).
- F. J. Merton (348820).
- H. A. R. Middleton (157541), RAFVR.
- J. G. Miller (1526244), RAFVR.
- O. J. Millis (411706).
- S. Millward (1492024), RAFVR.
- C. R. E. Milne (1515260), RAFVR.
- J. Moir (362449).
- W. G. Money (365295).
- W. J. Montgomery (566472).
- A. Moorcroft (590542).
- W. Morgan (332470).
- C. A. Moss (509458).
- R. E. Mullett (960201), RAFVR.
- R. Naylor (570271).
- D. S. Nellis (1366832), RAFVR.
- C. W. H. Newby (701).
- L. R. Newing (365523).
- A. L. Newman (812355).
- R. H. Norden (514049).
- R. W. Oakley (364161).
- E. R. C. Parker (1330239), RAFVR.
- C. L. Parsons (6226).
- A. Paton (343159).
- S. R. Pegg (910).
- F. B. Peters (506940).
- A. R. Pitman (15125).
- P. G. Pitman (350714).
- R. G. Pitt (810169), AAF.
- P. A. Plastow (510620).
- A. J. Pointer (351983).
- W. R. T. Pond (350699).
- H. T. Proctor (348350).
- N. L. Rathmell (356134).
- G. Raine (612768).
- E. R. Rawlings (530045).
- G. Redpath (518393).
- S. A. Rees (1331031), RAFVR.
- S. A. Reeve (346373).
- P. H. T. Reeves (1386345), RAFVR.
- G. E. Regelous (519691).
- E. Reid (1062197), RAFVR.
- J. Revell (3535Q3).
- T. S. Richmond (507169).
- L. Riddell (515595).
- H. A. Riddiford (516099).
- P. W. Riddlestone (517900).
- W. J. Riddoch (1348660), RAFVR.
- T. A. F. Ridout (1396242), RAFVR.
- A. D. Rigg (1380207), RAFVR.
- T. A. Rothwell (561357).
- J. Roylance (356298).
- J. Russell (335572).
- W. W. G. Ryding (362611).
- L. J. Salter (1585716), RAFVR.
- V. J. Saunders (1196536), RAFVR.
- F. S. Schofield (513136).
- J. W. Scobell (341660).
- R. G. R. Shaw (1321137), RAFVR.
- E. J. Shine (590563).
- M. E. Simmons, (36332).
- A. Smith (507333).
- B. Smith (525795).
- L. F. Smith (356362).
- S. L. Smith (364280).
- W. Smith (354712).
- W. E. Snelling (1313430), RAFVR.
- A. R. Sorbie (1562893), RAFVR.
- J. C. Stacey (1252831), RAFVR.
- J. E. Standlake (247032).
- A. J. Steedman (1137559), RAFVR.
- E. Stevenson (357997).
- A. R. Stewart (590891).
- J. C. Stewart (565026).
- A. N. Stitson (363736).
- M. Storey (513946).
- G. Suffield (508562).
- C. W. Sutherland (511942).
- C. T. G. Swansborough (1314215), RAFVR.
- A. L. Swinn (364435).
- N. L. Symons (1321436), RAFVR.
- P. J. H. Tallamy (366456).
- R. B. Tammas (1249283), RAFVR.
- R. W. Taylor (517398).
- W. Thompson (590241).
- L. J. Toms (509233).
- S. Tory (356293).
- J. Turnock (512827).
- J. F. Tye (1211892), RAFVR.
- F. J. H. Uttley (1008960), RAFVR.
- J. K. Vowles (1313955), RAFVR.
- J. B. Walker (940847), RAFVR.
- J. R. A. Walters (98462).
- W. G. Warde (365477).
- L. C. Warner (1288264), RAFVR.
- J. W. Whitehead (1310620), RAFVR.
- J. E. Wiggin (528247).
- J. M. Williams (618277).
- L. S. Williams (1590608), RAFVR.
- T. J. Wilson (1290605), RAFVR.
- W. H. Wilson (537612).
- E. D. Wood (364375).
- G. W. Wood (158072).
- P. Wood (947595), RAFVR.
- J. Wright (340156).
- P. Wyper (658953).
- J. O. M. Yardley (357901).

Acting Warrant Officers

- H. Dobson (935376), RAFVR.
- J. T. England (514129).
- F. Fairbotham (770984), RAFVR.
- A. A. Flowers (506549).
- J. E. C. Lewis (1158281), RAFVR.
- A. J. L. Maunder (591048).
- C. D. Troman (346461).

Flight Sergeants

- 330934 A. Adams.
- 507576 E. Aldridge.
- 1875454 E. G. Algar, RAFVR.
- 943005 G. F. Allmand, RAFVR.
- 537571 W. J. Amos.
- 1600366 H. J. Anderson, RAFVR.
- 566155 R. Anderson.
- 519872 J. Annand.
- 571680 H. Archer.
- 354201 C. H. Argent.
- 561023 W. G. Armstrong.
- 359978 J. W. Ashby.
- 569665 G. Ashton.
- 621632 A. J. Ashwell.
- 1585064 D. Bailey, RAFVR.
- 562454 L. A. Bailey.
- 610490 F. C. Bancroft.
- 507742 W. W. Barber.
- 1356352 A. Barron, RAFVR.
- 565502 J. L. Barton.
- 565501 A. H. Bartrop.
- 1302227 G. Bathurst, RAFVR.
- 509276 C. Batty.
- 344564 L. K. S. Bayley.
- 550158 J. McI. M. Bayne.
- 1216087 E. G. Beddoes, RAFVR.
- 1379976 A. F. Bell, RAFVR.
- 959656 C. McC. Bell, RAFVR.
- 510020 R. S. Bellman.
- 626805 S. R. Belsom.
- 353393 F. Bentley.
- 530927 F. J. Best.
- 743624 H. T. Betts, RAFVR.
- 904248 A. H. Bibbey, RAFVR.
- 800243 P. R. Bird, AAF.
- 1098941 J. S. Birrell, RAFVR.
- 1351710 A. A. Bishop, RAFVR.
- 1546946 C. Black, RAFVR.
- 565867 H. W. Blackney.
- 561062 W. K. Blakemore.
- 563519 G. Booth.
- 552982 J. J. Borrodaile.
- 616885 D. Botwright.
- 920111 C. Bowden, RAFVR.
- 344321 H. V. Bowers.
- 515425 E. T. Bowes.
- 13728 J. Boyer.
- 1336922 G. J. Brace, RAFVR.
- 566474 P. C. Brachi.
- 1600162 B. A. Bradbury, RAFVR.
- 909046 G. G. Bradley, RAFVR.
- 906748 G. Briggs, RAFVR.
- 523283 J. W. Brinsden.
- 1819038 R. E. Brocksopp, RAFVR.
- 931758 B. F. Brooks, RAFVR.
- 1065557 J. R. Brooks, RAFVR.
- 534569 A. N. Brown.
- 895410 M. Brown.
- 970443 S. J. Brownridge, RAFVR.
- 529905 J. Buckley.
- 519600 W. Francis-Burnett.
- 1592122 D. Burns, RAFVR.
- 335322 C. W. Burstow.
- 513408 J. T. Buxton.
- 1739534 R. Cabman, RAFVR.
- 538039 J. F. Carrington.
- 1825147 T. F. B. Carroll, RAFVR.
- 243295 L. H. Castle, RAFVR.
- 370049 H. A. Castledine.
- 1390696 N. F. Catt, RAFVR.
- 328714 A. E. Chambers.
- 563952 W. L. J. Chandler.
- 1436701 G. C. Chivers, RAFVR.
- 87851 C. S. Church.
- 347323 A. G. Clayson.
- 1215624 H. Clement, RAFVR.
- 546090 F. C. Clifton.
- 507057 T. S. Cochran.
- 348100 J. W. Cocker.
- 560568 A. S. Collison.
- 526200. A. F. Cook.
- 512743 R. W. Nicholas Cooper.
- 514634 F. G. Cooper.
- 505247 C. Cosgrove.
- 1300196 C. E. Cottingham, RAFVR.
- 1056536 L. Cowgill, RAFVR.
- 561077 E. W. A. Crook.
- 344775 S. R. Croucher.
- 638305 J. Cruikshank.
- 538033 G. P. Culverwell.
- 967494 J. M. Gumming, RAFVR.
- 203207 W. S. Cunnington.
- 988590 W. Cuthill, RAFVR.
- 564844 C. Dalton.
- 978017 W. L. Darling, RAFVR.
- 757406 T. E. Datlen, RAFVR.
- 636532 E. J. Davis.
- 517124 N. S. Day.
- 511187 T. Day.
- 512758 H. G. Davenport.
- 1655744 A. G. Davies, RAFVR.
- 980265 R. Davison, RAFVR.
- 942001 C. H. Day, RAFVR.
- 960344 C. C. De Fraine, RAFVR.
- 542822 D. A. Denham.
- 529972 D. A. A. Deverill.
- 530637 R. E. Dickens.
- 628402 J. Dickinson.
- 528511 W. E. Digby.
- 347637 J. Dixon.
- 521967 R. H. Dixon.
- 514698 A. Dodd.
- 335167 J. T. Donegan.
- 647779 E. J. Downing.
- 648453 A. E. Drury.
- 565321 T. S. Drury.
- 565114 R. A. Duffus.
- 649737 H. Dunn.
- 508920 P. B. Durkin.
- 980474 J. Eddleston, RAFVR.
- 507685 J. F. Eddy.
- 1851678 H. E. Edwards, RAFVR.
- 132283 A. E. Ellis.
- 567365 B. Ellis.
- 643710 O. Ellis.
- 862560 A. O. Errington, RAFVR.
- 566566 A. G. Evans.
- 977646 J. T. Evans, RAFVR.
- 761062 S. Eyre, RAFVR.
- 534464 W. R. Farquharson.
- 560113 W. Fawcett.
- 1387528 R. Figgins, RAFVR.
- 900397 A. F. M. Fisher, RAFVR.
- 350429 H. Fletcher.
- 1270970 S. H. T. Fletcher, RAFVR.
- 540647 R. S. Floyd.
- 1010718 R. H. Forth, RAFVR.
- 1398402 J. H. Francis, RAFVR.
- 908878 E. G. Gale, RAFVR.
- 564672 B. K. Gardiner.
- 344850 E. Garnett.
- 562703 F. G. Gearing.
- 561719 C. J. J. Gilbert.
- 560138 C. P. Gilbert.
- 505592 B. Giles.
- 1458792 J. L. Giles, RAFVR.
- 566546 S. C. Gill.
- 362355 H. Girling.
- 2208886 A. E. Glanville, RAFVR.
- 652298 F. E. C. Goatman, RAFVR.
- 506685 A. E. Gooch.
- 1600976 H. F. M. Gooderham, RAFVR.
- 343822 A. W. Goold.
- 1449328 R. E. Gordon, RAFVR.
- 1605203 A. G. Gould, RAFVR.
- 901216 R. A. Goulding, RAFVR.
- 568638 S. Goward.
- 565325 L. R. Gowers.
- 901211 F. W. H. Gowing, RAFVR.
- 16830 C. W. Gray.
- 710092 P. C. Green, RAFVR.
- 521181 F. Greening.
- 563878 H. Grey.
- 531978 J. H. Griffith.
- 1267166 D. W. Griffiths, RAFVR.
- 538001 P. J. Guiryn.
- 353234 W. P. Haddon.
- 562143 F. G. P. Hall.
- 567584 W. P. Haley.
- 564677 A. V. Hallett.
- 563173 B. T. Halling.
- 1037452 J. A. Halsall, RAFVR.
- 529718 C. J. Hamilu.
- 770952 J. W. Hancock, RAFVR.
- 564704 K. S. Hancock.
- 524790 J. D. Hanmore.
- 1219631 D. P. Harding, RAFVR.
- 911068 J. Harding, RAFVR.
- 527174. L. T. Harper.
- 1198500 A. S. Harris.
- 567265 F. Harris.
- 564724 F. S. Harrison.
- J542375 J. N. Harrison, RAFVR.
- 818057 O. D. Harrison, RAFVR.
- 562137 R. Harvey.
- 638258 W. E. Harvey.
- 525808 S. F. Hayhurst.
- 356771 F. W. Haynes.
- 1236358 E. Hemingway, RAFVR.
- 761223 R. T. Hewson, RAFVR.
- 812106 H. G. F. Hogg, RAFVR.
- 916925 R. G. Hollingdale, RAFVR.
- 560287 J. R. Hooper.
- 366116 A. G. House.
- 523443 F. Howes.
- 562762 J. Huddart.
- 550561 F. Hughson.
- 537569 F. Hunsley.
- 357668 F. T. Hutch.
- 364098 W. C. Hutchings.
- 533917 H. Hyde.
- 962501 J. Ingham, RAFVR.
- 509173 D. W. Jackson.
- 1432107 H. Jacques, RAFVR.
- 561764 A. T. Jarvis.
- 205629 W. Johnstone.
- 89584 G. Jolly, RAFVR.
- 537722 D. J. Jones.
- 1582853 G. E. Jones, RAFVR.
- 334019 L. Jones.
- 997811 A. S. H. Keightley, RAFVR.
- 366327 A. P. Kelly.
- 1183110 D. P. Kelly, RAFVR.
- 335963 W. H. Kendall, RAFVR.
- 550089 R. S. Kerswell.
- 1009999 A. B. Kesteven, RAFVR.
- 561571 W. H. G. Knight.
- 303058 R. H. Lacey.
- 611626 P. Laidler.
- 507374 J. B. Lancaster.
- 344020 W. H. Lawrence.
- 639571 P. Lawson.
- 1151598 E. G. Lee, RAFVR.
- 1176849 S. E. Legate, RAFVR.
- 519677 R. W. Letford.
- 565842 G. G. Lindley.
- 567379 F. W. Loffill.
- 348963 L. Lonorgan.
- 561291 J. Lough.
- 343656 J. Lynch.
- 524574 J. Y. Lyon.
- 1487125 C. M. McBride, RAFVR.
- 1302668 F. N. McCusker, RAFVR.
- 519145 H. McDowie.
- 980182 E. McGhie, RAFVR.
- 56820 J. McGregor.
- 221686 D. McLeod.
- 328lQ5 P. McInally.
- 906320 S. L. Magrill, RAFVR.
- 515002 N. R. Male.
- 1128018 J. Malinson, RAFVR.
- 546931 W. G. Manson.
- 1268107 F. G. Marchant, RAFVR.
- 1815531 P. J. Martin, RAFVR.
- 152993 J. F. Matthews.
- 562583 A. E. Mayall.
- 611466 H. A. Meikle.
- 919880 N. L. Merryman, RAFVR.
- 362072 A. J. Messenger.
- 1260562 J. Metcalfe, RAFVR.
- 529883 J. A. Middleton.
- 1323345 T. Miller, RAFVR.
- 624435 W. V. Miller.
- 523341 W. Miller.
- 1433129 M. K. Mills, RAFVR.
- 562205 S. G. Mills.
- 1343401 A. R. Mitchell, RAFVR.
- 1895417 M. Mitchell, RAFVR.
- 411348 W. Mitchell.
- 362541 C. A. Mobsy.
- 563486 F. J. Moreham.
- 539325 J. R. Morgan.
- 1320090 D. G. Morris, RAFVR.
- 561188 V. Mullis.
- 527964 J. H. F. Murphy.
- 569996 O. A. Neaber.
- 511770 M. C. Negus.
- 358626 V. A. C. Neill.
- 1132889 G. S. R. Nicholson, RAFVR.
- 370622 O. Nicholson.
- 1671822 B. Nundy (deceased).
- 563487 F. A. Oakshott.
- 560186 J. M. O'Connor.
- 519059 J. P. O'Leary.
- 1073660 C. J. Oliver, RAFVR.
- 565178 J. T. Orbell.
- 1451374 W. Parkingson, RAFVR.
- 519035 D. G. Parry.
- 355205 J. Parry.
- 370909 A. C. Payne.
- 564795 A. Paynter.
- 980737 R. C. Peacock, RAFVR.
- 904250 J. Peel, RAFVR.
- 58859 J. F. Pemberton.
- 770853 N. W. Pepper, RAFVR.
- 562595 C. C. Pettit.
- 566308 C. Pike.
- 33577 H. E. Pike.
- 1653141 R. C. Pitcon, RAFVR.
- 338218 D. H. Please.
- 640143 H. Plimmer.
- 1396056 L. F. H. Plummer, RAFVR.
- 1317822 W. C. Pope, RAFVR. (deceased).
- 1577492 N. H. Poynton, RAFVR.
- 1157765 H. T. Povey.
- 564361 A. Pratt.
- 937891 C. P. Preston, RAFVR.
- 533515 F. Prime.
- 1443963 R. Pursell, RAFVR.
- 573024 A. D. Purves.
- 520735 J. A. Quaile.
- 1428220 K. Rassett, RAFVR.
- 219 R. Raynbird.
- 1450087 L. J. Restall, RAFVR.
- 565289 H. Richards.
- 968712 J. L. Richardson, RAFVR.
- 562288 F. A. Riches.
- 973735 W. Rigby, RAFVR.
- 757004 L. T. Rimmer, RAFVR.
- 612803 W. Ripley.
- 563919 G. Ritchie.
- 365942 W. Roberts.
- 370700 G. W. Robinson.
- 1870661 M. E. Robson, RAFVR.
- 1260260 E. F. Rodwell, RAFVR.
- 1303090 K. S. Rogerson, RAFVR.
- 512276 F. E. P. Rollins.
- 363224 W. G. Rossiter.
- 770377 S. Ruff, RAFVR.
- 1620811 T. Ryalls, RAFVR.
- 517552 G. H. Sanders.
- 364288 W. F. Sargent.
- 365801 R. H. Scadden.
- 1317175 P. K. Sellick, RAFVR.
- 590931 D. F. Sharp.
- 562390 F. Sherwood.
- 744323 L. G. Simmons, RAFVR.
- 1385021 R. E. Simmons, RAFVR.
- 328649 J. Simpson.
- 349890 W. J. Sims.
- 1064103 J. Sinclair, RAFVR.
- 1133830 C. R. Singleton, RAFVR.
- 581535 L. G. Smart.
- 615794 A. J. Smith.
- 560923 B. A. Smith.
- 916647 G. T. Smith, RAFVR.
- 560191 V. Smith.
- 1329507 J. Snaith, RAFVR.
- 565007 A. M. Sobey.
- 513766 C. H. J. Spearman.
- 560420 W. L. Spratt.
- 513087 L. Sproston.
- 1592489 E. A. Stead, RAFVR.
- 1850299 S. C. Steele, RAFVR.
- 1615880 L. R. Steward, RAFVR.
- 524484 O. F. St. Martin.
- 1581055 C. P. Stokes, RAFVR.
- 517478 C. W. Stokes.
- 1868783 J. J. Strong, RAFVR.
- 1019780 S. Sutcliffe, RAFVR.
- 803646 W. P. Swanson.
- 564439 W. A. Tait.
- 564457 E. J. L. Tallack.
- 155777 A. N. Tachell.
- 520991 M. Tatlow.
- 217188 P. S. Taylor.
- 517688 R. E. Taylor.
- 1062858 T. A. Taylor, RAFVR.
- 1459680 W. B. Taylor, RAFVR.
- 524844 A. S. Teale.
- 976060 J. R. Thaxton, RAFVR.
- 919752 L. D. Davey-Thomas, RAFVR.
- 760427 W. H. Thomas, RAFVR.
- 753679 G. B. Thompson, RAFVR.
- 812019 J. C. Thompson, RAFVR.
- 565425 F. Thomson.
- 565034 J. W. Thurston.
- 560712 S. E. Tribe.
- 569184 S. C. Turner.
- 330155 A. J. Twydell.
- 1800263 D. E. Veitch, RAFVR.
- 365472 L. H. Villiers.
- 1492299 L. C. Wade, RAFVR.
- 563318, S. Wadham.
- 560508 E. J. Wakeham.
- 327571 F. H. Wall.
- 363483 M. I. Wallis.
- 533534 J. L Walsh.
- 1009015 T. Walsh, RAFVR.
- 366478 A. E. Walter.
- 623780 C. L. Warmington.
- 514545 L. F. Warren.
- 591164 A. Waterhouse.
- 1405593 F. S. Watkins, RAFVR.
- 519553 D. B. Watson.
- 1589906 K. Watson, RAFVR.
- 561802 R. J. Watson.
- 568350 L. C. Webb.
- 976131 L. Weighell, RAFVR.
- 571177 R. A. Wheatley.
- 1696143 W. Wheeler, RAFVR.
- 516782 F. H. Wheller.
- 342591 F. W. Whitaker.
- 1601556 G. D. White, RAFVR.
- 848592 H. Whitmore, RAFVR.
- 542440 V. A. E. Wicklow.
- 572520 J. Wilcox.
- 22600 C. J. Wilson.
- 575581 P. J. Wilson.
- 562641 A. E. Williams.
- 570201 W. Williams.
- 534861 W. R. Williams.
- 341352 J. Windebank.
- 621381 C. A. Wisbey.
- 938203 Wootton, RAFVR.
- 518346 H. Wordsworth.
- 563242 J. A. Wright.
- 1329673 A. E. Wynn, RAFVR.
- 1261320 L. F. R. Yeo, RAFVR.
- 937467 C. E. Young, RAFVR.
- 561808 E. W. Young.
- 506768 J. D. Young.

Acting Flight Sergeants

- 411455 A. R. Atkinson.
- 1130158 B. Beacock, RAFVR.
- 944830 R. L. Bunney, RAFVR.
- 577634 J. M. Caines.
- 1348425 J. Chape, RAFVR.
- 903189 W. J. Childs, RAFVR.
- 903678 A. J. Cockburn, RAFVR.
- 1441476 J. G, Coughtrey, RAFVR.
- 462124 A. F. Curran.
- 615901 J. Dougan.
- 527360 R. Douglas.
- 575026 D. Duncan.
- 997521 J. H. Dutch.
- 1103350 W. Ellis, RAFVR.
- 1080817 F. Eratt, RAFVR.
- 176002 G. B. Goold.
- 351778 J. Grant.
- 1488976 D. H. Greenhough, RAFVR.
- 943731 R. Hall, RAFVR.
- 1008281 J. Higginson, RAFVR.
- 544088 G. R. J. Holt.
- 570696 D. F. Izard.
- 1426677 E. J. Jewesson, RAFVR.
- 1148065 W. F. Jones, RAFVR.
- 978440 A. Kinnell, RAFVR.
- 610231 J. Lewis.
- 1305982 A. Lindsay.
- 982862 R. W. McMinnis, RAFVR.
- 770514 E. J. Martin, RAFVR.
- 11594 J. T. Morgan.
- 509658 D. Nelson.
- 522491 J. O'Hanlon.
- 531712 G. A. Patterson.
- 1157176 E. J. Purnell, RAFVR.
- 624693 J. Richardson.
- 1177826 N. E. F. Rodgers, RAFVR.
- 749158 F. R. Samuels, RAFVR.
- 525253 A. V. C. Somerville.
- 541295 G. Steen.
- 743965 W. H. Thorne, RAFVR.
- 352945 S. R. Tomblin.
- 1460661 W. H. Treble, RAFVR.
- 1158933 H. Walmsley, RAFVR.
- 1150824 D. J. Watts, RAFVR.
- 1258204 E. T. Wellard, RAFVR.
- 935057 D. Whitlock, RAFVR.
- 1353867 H. A. G. Wilson, RAFVR.

Sergeants

- 509493 F. A. H. Abel.
- 1010594 R. F. Adams, RAFVR.
- 1208366 J. H. Addis, RAFVR. (deceased).
- 161215 R. Aitchison.
- 913299 E. G. Alexander, RAFVR.
- 610252 A. W. Allen.
- 1109651 C. E. Allen, RAFVR.
- 1059824 H. Ambrose, RAFVR.
- 1009763 W. G. D. M. Anderson.
- 817260 J. McP. Asher.
- 1413365 H. S. Aspinall.
- 1003845 T. Atkinson, RAFVR.
- 564566 A. L. L. Axtell.
- 1053785 W. R. Baird.
- 1064861 W. E. Bairston, RAFVR.
- 1265033 H. R. Baker, RAFVR.
- 1029014 T. C. M. Baker, RAFVR.
- 750110 C. Bamford, RAFVR.
- 1406491 R. Banbury, RAFVR.
- 522973 T. A. F. Banks.
- 947986 T. H. Barlow, RAFVR.
- 542737 H. W. Barnard.
- 953436 A. W. Barnes, RAFVR.
- 917365 J. D. Barnett, RAFVR.
- 1256961 W. C. Bass, RAFVR.
- 979841 G. W. Basterfield, RAFVR.
- 949848 R. G. Bateman, RAFVR.
- 568891 N. Bater.
- 1869530 L. J. Batten, RAFVR.
- 993535 H. M. Battersby, RAFVR.
- 804381 C. R. Baynam, RAFVR.
- 804435 G. Baynes, RAFVR.
- 1084005 F. Beaumont, RAFVR.
- 743846 G. S. Bell.
- 1114244 H. Bell, RAFVR.
- 1326631 G. W Bennett, RAFVR.
- 890237 M. Bent, AAF.
- 1310429 W. Beswick, RAFVR.
- 1200194 E. A. Betts, RAFVR.
- 544017 R. J. Bevan.
- 1167764 B. D. Bezer, RAFVR.
- 925896 C. E. Binge, RAFVR.
- 903500 W. R. Birbeck, RAFVR.
- 1077453 C. D. Bisset, RAFVR.
- 505709 J. W. Blackman.
- 1378451 R. Blanires, RAFVR.
- 1182103 L. W. Bland, RAFVR.
- 1187389 R. J. Blatchford, RAFVR.
- 1141632 C. O. Bleazard, RAFVR.
- 1587479 R. Blocksedge, RAFVR.
- 570959 F. R. Blytheman.
- 1308999 G. B. Boardman, RAFVR.
- 44063 A. J. Boddy.
- 1633096 A. G. Botten, RAFVR.
- 549471 G. S. Boulton.
- 233029 M. J. S. Bowden.
- 1456580 A. E. Bowers, RAFVR.
- 956028 H. T. Boyle, RAFVR.
- 526855 T. W. Boynton.
- 863370 E. C. Bradshaw, AAF.
- 569740 C. B. Brinkley.
- 553342 A. H, Brookes.
- 1051854 M. Brooks, RAFVR.
- 569589 D. G. Brown.
- 815127 F. D. Brown, RAFVR.
- 1074619 H. H. Brown, RAFVR.
- 1183168 L. W. Brown, RAFVR.
- 639859 R. A. Brown.
- 1409986 E. W. Bryant, RAFVR.
- 536486 G. Buckle.
- 532225 A. R. Bulley.
- 1051689 T. H. Bunting, RAFVR.
- 633462 H. Busby.
- 1222904 V. Cardin, RAFVR.
- 355780 H. E. Carter.
- 1584361 H.D. Carver, RAFVR.
- 571118 R. G. Carey.
- 1005680 F. L. Cason, RAFVR.
- 569110 E. V. A. Castellano.
- 508661 A. C. Challoner.
- 950683 W. Chalmers, RAFVR.
- 924398 C. J. Chaloner, RAFVR.
- 1096193 G. H. Chapman, RAFVR.
- 1185799 L. Chapman, RAFVR.
- 771283 R. I. Charlish, RAFVR.
- 509255 A. Chart.
- 1180623 R. Cheetham, RAFVR.
- 1155296 W. E. H. Chivers, RAFVR.
- 975725 W. J. Chocker, RAFVR.
- 1222928 D. L. Church, RAFVR.
- 931950 J. C. N. Clark, RAFVR.
- 528882 V. Clark, BEM.
- 1071142 T. Clarke, RAFVR.
- 1264426 P. D. Clarke, RAFVR.
- 1106098 A. H. Cobley, RAFVR.
- 1650256 K. D. Cocke, RAFVR.
- 1181040 F. W. Collett, RAFVR.
- 770764 W. J. Collett, RAFVR.
- 982276 J. Collinge, RAFVR.
- 900549 T. E. Collins, RAFVR.
- 591707 A. W. Cook.
- 1154110 E. G. Cook, RAFVR.
- 1379300 L. W. F. Cookman, RAFVR.
- 936933 L. R. Cooksley, RAFVR.
- 989719 G. W. Cooper, RAFVR.
- 756163 L. H. G. Cooper, RAFVR.
- 1064178 R. Cooper, RAFVR.
- 934038 P. C. Gopsey, RAFVR.
- 2014994 M. W. Corbett, RAFVR.
- 544219 W. Cormack.
- 445495 L. M. Corner.
- 982613 J. Cornfoot, RAFVR.
- 1431465 J. H. Cornish, RAFVR.
- 539134 T. M. Corrigan.
- 3S9392 M. G. Costello.
- 569153 S. C. Couzins.
- 562475 T. M. Cowan.
- 907314 M. Cowell, RAFVR.
- 907956 C. Crampton, RAFVR.
- 3988 S. Crane.
- 1066752 R. A. Craven, RAFVR.
- 538551 W. L. Crawford.
- 1300366 W. Crewe, RAFVR.
- 902628 D. G. Crisp, RAFVR.
- 569094 S. C. Cripps.
- 1295879 R. E. Crook, RAFVR.
- 638226 D. J. Crotty.
- 755085 H. C. Crowther, RAFVR.
- 1136416 J. A. Crozier, RAFVR.
- 551098 I. Crump.
- 947309 H. W. Cureton, RAFVR.
- 1125135 W. E. Curry, RAFVR.
- 349757 A. Dalgleish.
- 570154 R. Dalrymple.
- 1414319 K. O. Dancey, RAFVR.
- 1407303 L. D. Daniel, RAFVR.
- 1067580 T. Dargavel, RAFVR.
- 1052035 E. G. Davidson, RAFVR.
- 542055 J. J. R. Davies.
- 538648 S. Davies.
- 1056256 W. H. Davies, RAFVR.
- 568769 A. T. Davis.
- 652627 G. H. Davis.
- 1508238 E. M. Davison, RAFVR.
- 1896482 T. L. De Coene, RAFVR.
- 1015356 W. Deere, RAFVR.
- 1161040 J. R. Diment, RAFVR.
- 943790 G. Dobie, RAFVR.
- 757579 A. T. Dobson, RAFVR.
- 994244 B. N. Dockray, RAFVR.
- 819125 L. G. Doderer, RAFVR.
- 621303 G. Donnelly.
- 567657 R. O. L. Downes.
- 526733 J. E. Downey.
- 641974 J. W. Dowse.
- 752224 C. F. B. Drummond, RAFVR.
- 960765 J. L. E. Drury, RAFVR.
- 525752 L. Duffield.
- 1156690 R. S. Durant, RAFVR.
- 978457 S. H. Dutton, RAFVR.
- 518083 C. E. Edwards.
- 1151719 F. G. Edwards, RAFVR.
- 534608 W. S. J. Edwards.
- 961655 R. J. Eke, RAFVR.
- 1023182 F. Elcoate, RAFVR.
- 522779 E. G. Ellis.
- 1160299 P. A. Ellis, RAFVR.
- 1151704 J. G. Evans, RAFVR.
- 540064 L. G. Evans.
- 1206249 R. J. Everitt, RAFVR.
- 935119 L. N. Fairley, RAFVR.
- 1192988 G. H. Parish, RAFVR.
- 1073619 J. Farnhill, RAFVR.
- 999848 W. A. L. Farquarson, RAFVR.
- 631820 D. H. Fear.
- 1017741 J. Fiddling, RAFVR.
- 939099 J. L. Field, RAFVR.
- 528873 H. J. Finegan.
- 654617 A. J. Fisher.
- 961066 S. L. Flack, RAFVR.
- 951577 L. Fletcher, RAFVR.
- 923901 R. T. Fletcher, RAFVR.
- 641644 M. F. Flower.
- 916026 J. W. E. Flowers, RAFVR.
- 527882 J. F. Floyd.
- 1110885 W. S Forbes, RAFVR.
- 1006433 H. Forster, RAFVR.
- 1350922 R. L. Forster, RAFVR.
- 907678 E. Fox, RAFVR.
- 984331 R. L. Francis, RAFVR.
- 1169976 M. Freeman, RAFVR.
- 3000112 P. T. Freeman, RAFVR.
- 1250290 J. E. Friend, RAFVR.
- 571413 J. F. Funnell.
- 1180617 R. W. Gadsden, RAFVR.
- 1868185 G. R. Gallear, RAFVR.
- 1403072 J. H. D. Gambolt, RAFVR.
- 624665 A. Gannon.
- 901118 D. S. T. Gardiner, RAFVR.
- 817056 W. G. Geddes, RAFVR.
- 901822 W. A. Gedge, RAFVR.
- 1161243 J. H. Gibbs, RAFVR.
- 1523701 W. A. Gibson, RAFVR.
- 530105 J. J. Giddings.
- 616356 N. G. Gilbert.
- 517024 C. Gilkes.
- 941190 F. I. Gilman, RAFVR.
- 1010413 H. Gilmore, RAFVR.
- 523254 J. E. Glass.
- 952895 W. Glossop, RAFVR.
- 1435347 F. S. Glyde, RAFVR.
- 532032 T. G. W. Goddard.
- 1215369 R. H. Goldsmith, RAFVR.
- 1568789 K. S. Grainger, RAFVR.
- 983933 G. A. Grange, RAFVR.
- 550502 J. G. Grant.
- 745219 G. N. S. Gray, RAFVR.
- 1287214 L. J. A. Gray, RAFVR.
- 770737 S. A. Gray, RAFVR.
- 508116 J. D. Greaves.
- 993944 G. N. Green, RAFVR.
- 970338 H. Green, RAFVR.
- 1282797 L. C. F. Green, RAFVR.
- 1550195 T. W. Greene, RAFVR.
- 903108 A. G. Greenfield, RAFVR.
- 905379 E. L. Griffiths, RAFVR.
- 1155957 R. G. Griffiths, RAFVR.
- 2003359 E. W. Grist, RAFVR.
- 654094 T. G. Grover.
- 568469 N. Groves.
- 752075 C. F. Hadwen, RAFVR.
- 997149 H. C. Hague, RAFVR.
- 1215370 R. Hall, RAFVR.
- 528936 S. Hall.
- 932046 J. A. Halse, RAFVR.
- 1248537 G. V. Hamilton, RAFVR.
- 982357 J. Hamilton, RAFVR.
- 907334 H. H. Hammond, RAFVR.
- 934005 F. E. Hancock, RAFVR.
- 651549 S. R. Hancock.
- 1178782 P. G. Hancox, RAFVR.
- 524562 J. B. Hanley.
- 535124 J. D. Hanson.
- 1002733 J. D. Hardisty, RAFVR.
- 1026368 L. W. H. Harle, RAFVR.
- 1260173 E. V. Harmes, RAFVR.
- 1608330 R. D. A. Harmsworth, RAFVR.
- 1195963 J. W. Harris, RAFVR.
- 939641 J. M. Harrison, RAFVR.
- 1385618 T. A. Harrison, RAFVR.
- 1167096 F. G. Harms, RAFVR.
- 1205777 L. Hartley, R.A.F V.R.
- 957561 A. E. Hartshorm, RAFVR.
- 922664 A. J. Hatcher, RAFVR.
- 1169434 G. L. Hawkins, RAFVR.
- 618346 H. F. Hawkins.
- 702894 G. Hayden, RAFVR.
- 531972 T. Hayes.
- 518844 P. V. Hayley.
- 1015128 T. F. C. Hayward, RAFVR.
- 536978 J. Healy.
- 1106443 L. Heartfield, RAFVR.
- 855275 E. J. Henderson, AAF.
- 521770 J. T. Hendry.
- 586375 G. H. Hepworth.
- 569342 P. D. Heuser.
- 622664 T. J. Hewlett.
- 993751 A. B, Hill, RAFVR.
- 771140 T. L. Hill, RAFVR.
- 543186 W. S. B. Hill.
- 1173216 R. L. Hilliard, RAFVR.
- 931144 R. Hilton, RAFVR.
- 1835815 H. H. Hobbis, RAFVR.
- 631301 C. J. A. Hobbs.
- 1200289 H. Hobbs, RAFVR.
- 1549340 S. Hodgson, RAFVR.
- 702818 G. H. Hoggard, RAFVR.
- 1690872 W. J, Hoggarth, RAFVR.
- 1182742 J. H. Holbrook, RAFVR.
- 932896 J. Holding, RAFVR.
- 958377 F. G. Holloway, RAFVR.
- 1171495 H. C. Holyer, RAFVR.
- 533500 R. J. Hopkins.
- 1221082 H. W. Horder, RAFVR.
- 536561 A. T. Howard.
- 1116051 N. J. Howarth, RAFVR.
- 1161093 E. Howes, RAFVR.
- 1360440 W. R. S. Howie, RAFVR.
- 352984 W. T. Howl.
- 618319 H. G. Hows, RAFVR.
- 638884 G. J. Hoy.
- 1454943 J. C. Hughes, RAFVR.
- 535380 T. Hughes.
- 981657 W. Y. Hughes, RAFVR.
- 530487 R. J. Humphreys.
- 1158898 K. Hunter, RAFVR.
- 981921 S. C. Hunter, RAFVR.
- 527455 F. M. Hurst.
- 530090 E. Hutchinson.
- 644104 E. G. Inge.
- 1524377 J. S. Ingham, RAFVR.
- 1198346 B. T. Ive, RAFVR.
- 1392789 D. H. W. James, RAFVR.
- 1332661 F. S. James, RAFVR.
- 533598 H. L. James.
- 945151 T. J. Jarratt, RAFVR.
- 747265 J. C. Jemetta, RAFVR.
- 635437 J. Jenkins.
- 1558525 W. Jenkins, RAFVR.
- 930953 L. M. Jennings, RAFVR.
- 920294 B. E. Jenson, RAFVR.
- 622747 A. W. Jobling.
- 1283862 A. W. Johnson, RAFVR.
- 750207 B. H. Johnson, RAFVR.
- 970000 J. P. Johnstone, RAFVR.
- 612916 E. Jones.
- 1017568 E. Ditton-Jones, RAFVR.
- 621684 H. Jones.
- 1028423 H. Jones, RAFVR.
- 1655458 I. R. Jones, RAFVR.
- 995879 J. Jones, RAFVR.
- 642621 J. D. Jones.
- 613651 R. Jones.
- 571284 R. G. A. Jones.
- 1285422 T. C. Jones, RAFVR.
- 1475498 E. R. T. Jowett, RAFVR.
- 631377 W. R. Kearney.
- 1133187 N. B. Kenyon, RAFVR.
- 625476 W. Keresey.
- 1105639 R. Kerr, RAFVR.
- 1161953 C. W. J. Kightley, RAFVR.
- 987752 J. A. King, RAFVR.
- 1052744 B. Kinsella, RAFVR.
- 1289108 A. E. Kiss, RAFVR.
- 572325 J. R. Knight.
- 619507 W. Knight.
- 959876 F. S. Knowles, RAFVR.
- 992905 C. Lancaster, RAFVR.
- 1009278 G. Lancaster, RAFVR.
- 770705 F. E. Lane, RAFVR.
- 1814641 J. Lanning, RAFVR.
- 909136 J. F. Lawrence, RAFVR.
- 1255138 J. H. Lawrence, RAFVR.
- 537785 F. J. Lawson.
- 548823 G. Lawson.
- 2086529 D. Leech, RAFVR.
- 1122456 E. Leech, RAFVR.
- 989533 A. Leggatt, RAFVR.
- 1029781 L. I. Lerego, RAFVR.
- 1109256 C. H. J. Lewis, RAFVR.
- 962570 F. C. G. Lewis, RAFVR.
- 743480 W. T. G. Levers, RAFVR.
- 774919 M. M. Liepmann, RAFVR.
- 959118 K. G. Lister, RAFVR.
- 286248 J. J. Little.
- 1174076.H. Lloyd, RAFVR.
- 1160616 R. G. Lock, RAFVR.
- 944786 W. E. Longley, RAFVR.
- 1615664 A. L. Lovett, RAFVR.
- 749563 G. L. Low, RAFVR.
- 749887 K. D. Lucas, RAFVR.
- 1290914 A. A. Ludlam, RAFVR.
- 900151 C. A. Macdonald, RAFVR.
- 1006975 R. A. McFarlane, RAFVR.
- 639358 P. J. McIlwee.
- 972817 W. J. C. G. McIntosh, RAFVR.
- 1115554 J. McKeen, RAFVR.
- 1555859 G. L. Mackenzie, RAFVR.
- 998247 C. R. McLeish, RAFVR.
- 1195267 D. McLellan, RAFVR.
- 995607 T. J. W. McNeice, RAFVR.
- 566473 C. B. H. McNiven.
- 646218 F. W. Madeley, RAFVR.
- 1454953 A. Madigan, RAFVR.
- 936247 H. Males, RAFVR.
- 1570417 M. W. Maliace, RAFVR.
- 900500 D. E. Mansfield, RAFVR.
- 633523 G. Mapley.
- 964504 H. Marlow, RAFVR.
- 1247867 S. G. Marrett, RAFVR.
- 622892 J. M. Marsden.
- 999159 H. Marsh, RAFVR.
- 531678 F. Marshall.
- 547150 J. S. Marshall.
- 1081672 W. S. Marshall, RAFVR.
- 964347 H. Martin, RAFVR.
- 1377471 A. A. Mason, RAFVR.
- 1867316 A. C Massy, RAFVR.
- 1017295 S. Matthews, RAFVR.
- 1106110 K. R. Mawer, RAFVR.
- 804247 R. May, RAFVR.
- 1164520 B. J. B. Meadows, RAFVR.
- 941600 D. Meager, RAFVR.
- 1062687 H. Menzies, RAFVR.
- 1263878 E. J. F. Metherell, RAFVR.
- 1376330 S. J. Mexter, RAFVR.
- 1365046 S. N. Mickell, RAFVR.
- 508235 D. R. Milk.
- 964542 J. E. Miller, RAFVR.
- 1018741 J. S. Miller, RAFVR.
- 941264 J. D. Millett, RAFVR.
- 549929 W. F. MlLligan.
- 840964 F. R. Mills, AAF.
- 749895 T. A. Mills, RAFVR.
- 527819 L. A. Mitchell.
- 919114 D. Mockford, RAFVR.
- 1027052 J. Moffat, RAFVR.
- 2036304 M. McG. O. M. Moir, RAFVR.
- 970420 J. S. Moodie, RAFVR.
- 1171551 H. J. Moon, RAFVR.
- 2022665 L. C. Moon, RAFVR.
- 1071371 J. G. Moore, RAFVR.
- 1152729 S. R. Moore, RAFVR.
- 1112138 S. H. Morgan, RAFVR.
- 1196527 V. Morrall, RAFVR.
- 1026038 W. Morris, RAFVR.
- 1247866 S. H. Morrison, RAFVR.
- 528059 R. F. Morriss.
- 1184334 G. D. Morton, RAFVR.
- 539755 A. H. Moss.
- 1467452 H. N. Moss, RAFVR.
- 536858 A. H. Murphy.
- 1101274 A. Murray, RAFVR.
- 1356905 J. A. Murray, RAFVR.
- 508239 T. M. Murray.
- 959433 B. Mc. V. Naylor, RAFVR.
- 1164334 A. G. Newitt, RAFVR.
- 1031653 J. A. Newsome, RAFVR.
- 943239 L. Nicholas, RAFVR.
- 1467807 C. H. J. Nichols, RAFVR.
- 610742 L. K. Nixon.
- 1009031 R. F. H. Noddle, RAFVR.
- 1377950 H. P. Norrington, RAFVR.
- 567094 R. H. Norris.
- 654333 F. H. Northcott.
- 1282994 E. G. Nowell, RAFVR.
- 536713 G. Nuttall.
- 204651 W. W. O'Connor.
- 949856 W. Oliver, RAFVR.
- 1202815 J. J. O'Sullivan, RAFVR.
- 563003 J. C. Page.
- 1310475 F. A. Palmer, RAFVR.
- 10136 F. E. Parker.
- 613478 J. W. Parker.
- 1182792 W. S. C. Parker, RAFVR.
- 1198720 L. E. J. Parlett, RAFVR.
- 568468 R. Parrott.
- 643445 E. Patterson.
- 1249697 H. J. Payne, RAFVR.
- 1300552 E. W. A. Peacock, RAFVR.
- 934372 V. I. C. Pearce, RAFVR.
- 1028270 D. Percy, RAFVR.
- 956748 J. T. Perkins, RAFVR.
- 1231330 C. E. D. Perry, RAFVR.
- 523308 A. Pickles.
- 572230 R. E. Pilcher.
- 851382 G. E. Pilley.
- 1209899 R. A. H. Pinnock, RAFVR.
- 900415 G. H. Piper, RAFVR.
- 902670 P. Pittman, RAFVR.
- 756102 N. J Pitts, RAFVR.
- 622765 F. W. Poole.
- 636417 A Potts.
- 1213947 L. N. Poulter, RAFVR.
- 808148 H. Powell, RAFVR.
- 510141 E. C. Preece.
- 1171748 H. E. Price, RAFVR.
- 610171 S. J. Price.
- 527695 W. O. Price.
- 905741 J. E. Prime, RAFVR.
- 963954 E. H. Prior, RAFVR.
- 983049 R. Pritchard, RAFVR.
- 573540 F. C. Punshon.
- 634980 G. T. Quick.
- 749069 A. Quince, RAFVR.
- 638072 P. L. F. Ralph.
- 863355 N. A. Read, RAFVR.
- 753005 P. A. Reader, RAFVR.
- 960141 C. L. Reading, RAFVR.
- 1193895 D. E. Rees, RAFVR.
- 754409 S. R. Reeve, RAFVR.
- 990677 E. J. Renshaw, RAFVR.
- 1265956 J. W. Richards, RAFVR.
- 743940 G. W. Richardson, RAFVR.
- 803644 J. Ritchie, RAFVR.
- 701672 C. T. Roberts, RAFVR.
- 629410 J. Roberts.
- 338193 J. T. Roberts.
- 570489 S. Roberts.
- 576462 D. F. Robins.
- 370429 J. Robinson.
- 1172512. P. Robinson, RAFVR.
- 568712 T. Robinson.
- 1105348 W. A. Robinson, RAFVR.
- 241298 C. Robson.
- 1253617 W. J. Rock, RAFVR.
- 1246113 P. J. Rooney, RAFVR.
- 1220418 L. Rosenberg, RAFVR.
- 569559 D. Rossell.
- 1173467 J. Routledge, RAFVR.
- 917053 C. H. Rowe, RAFVR.
- 777846 A. Rubenstein, RAFVR.
- 1806058 F. J. C. Rushbrooke, RAFVR.
- 1061577 J. T. Russell, RAFVR.
- 1203034 K. Rutter, RAFVR.
- 551055 L. Ryan.
- 923796 J. R. Sadler, RAFVR.
- 537388 T. G. Salter.
- 1261549 A. R. Sandoe, RAFVR.
- 990935 R. Sands, RAFVR.
- 353019 C. R. Saunders.
- 1295889 E. C. Saunders, RAFVR.
- 113339 J. A. Savage, RAFVR.
- 975765 S. W. H. Scawen, RAFVR.
- 1303177 B. Scothern, RAFVR.
- 1198059 A. Scott, RAFVR.
- 1164907 F. J. Scott, RAFVR.
- 993352 H. Scott, RAFVR.
- 633839 H. Scott.
- 958279 H. J. Scott, RAFVR.
- 753645 W. Scott, RAFVR.
- 569116 R. D. Seabrook.
- 1359859 E. C. Seaton, RAFVR.
- 864987 R. F. Sewell.
- 632576 J. Seymour.
- 1013395 J. F. Shaw, RAFVR.
- 702383 H. Sheldon, RAFVR.
- 1131344 W. Shepherd, RAFVR.
- 619462 L. H. J. Shrivell.
- 370123 L. Sifleet.
- 1203406 J. Simmons, RAFVR.
- 43195 A. E. J. Simpson, RAFVR.
- 809202 J. Simpson, RAFVR.
- 1011698 J. B. Simpson, RAFVR.
- 1810930 R. W. P. Singlehurst, RAFVR.
- 1110490 W. J. Singleton, RAFVR.
- 1192310 W. P. Skillington, RAFVR.
- 1066133 H. Slater, RAFVR.
- 922372 R. C. Smallbone, RAFVR.
- 526800 G. A. Smart.
- 652940 C. E. Smith.
- 540391 E. B. Smith.
- 1210134 G. L. Smith, RAFVR.
- 970711 H. Smith, RAFVR.
- 248445 J. Smith.
- 890338 K. M. W. Smith, AAF.
- 1173996 P. Smith, RAFVR.
- 744872 W. R. Smith.
- 614966 G. M. Spankie.
- 572772 H. Spencer.
- 622359 F. Spiby.
- 1086607 H. L. Spicer, RAFVR.
- 1070824 H. Spindley, RAFVR.
- 441320 D. I. M. Spong.
- 566352 G. Spurr.
- 973305 F. Stafford, RAFVR.
- 644740 K. S. Standing.
- 995804 R. Stephenson, RAFVR.
- 1054082 J. W. Stevens, RAFVR.
- 540576 A. W. Stewart.
- 1172394 P. Stewart, RAFVR.
- 1169077 H. Streeter, RAFVR.
- 1049237 A. Stringer, RAFVR.
- 1449297 C. A. Strudwick, RAFVR.
- 752884 R. H. Stubbings, RAFVR.
- 906559 R. A. Sturman, RAFVR.
- 1114913 J. Sutcliffe, RAFVR.
- 1166750 L. J. Sweet, RAFVR.
- 1402992 E. S. Sykes, RAFVR.
- 981734 W. Talbot, RAFVR.
- 1251423 E. W. Taylor, RAFVR.
- 1103735 F. Taylor, RAFVR.
- 856621 J. Taylor, AAF.
- 1003963 J. Taylor, RAFVR.
- 580681 J. F. Taylor.
- 1109934 T. Taylor, RAFVR.
- 567831 T. W. Taylor.
- 982033 N. Temple, RAFVR.
- 1250259 R. H. Terry, RAFVR.
- 844747 W. H. E. Thatcher, AAF.
- 1253109 B. H. K. Thompson, RAFVR.
- 1303055 E. Thompson, RAFVR.
- 11542307 J. B. Thompson.
- 1053557 A. Thomson, RAFVR.
- 998357 D. Thomson, RAFVR.
- 528979 W. L. Thornton.
- 1063638 L. Thorpe, RAFVR.
- 992491 T. P. Thorpe, RAFVR.
- 1287953 R. L. Till, RAFVR.
- 529550 N. Tinkler.
- 520389 G. Toft.
- 982587 F. Tomlinson, RAFVR.
- 574945 J. U. W. Tompkins.
- 427196 V. L. Townley.
- 756581 L. Trowbridge, RAFVR.
- 370127 J. Tuff.
- 1284199 A. G. Turner, RAFVR.
- 905635 A. W. Turner, RAFVR.
- 213842 A. P. Tyler.
- 905115 J. Vale, RAFVR.
- 1843393 J. C. Vaugham, RAFVR.
- 640082 W. S. Vent.
- 940667 J. A. Vickerstaff, RAFVR.
- 752017 C. Vickery, RAFVR.
- 570449 G. W. Vidgem.
- 1254330 A. F. Vidler, RAFVR.
- 1152217 L. A. F. Wadham, RAFVR.
- 1103430 E. Wadsworth, RAFVR.
- 913054 R. L. Waelend, RAFVR.
- 1156079 F. R. C. Wall, RAFVR.
- 927271 J. Wallace, RAFVR.
- 520483 H. A. W. Walters.
- 552432 E. F. Watkins.
- 569832 R. C. Watkins.
- 1150444 R. R. G. Watkins, RAFVR.
- 1186350 R. W. Watkins, RAFVR.
- 522921 J. Watson.
- 1039429 M. H. Watson, RAFVR.
- 746162 W. A. Watson, RAFVR.
- 1195858 A. W. J. Watts, RAFVR.
- 935596 D. P. O'B. Watts, RAFVR.
- 1224361 M. F. Watts, RAFVR.
- 1204281 G. Weaver, RAFVR.
- 644620 G. H. Weaver.
- 1360609 J. R. Weaver, RAFVR.
- 922305 L. C. Webb, RAFVR.
- 342234 J. Wedgewood.
- 1897092 R. P. V. Wells, RAFVR.
- 750374 D. C. West, RAFVR.
- 1007899 S. Westgate, RAFVR.
- 1152458 F. Whapples, RAFVR.
- 910899 E. F. Wheal, RAFVR.
- 532926 D. White.
- 1080953 J. W. Whitehead, RAFVR.
- 624057 J. Whiting.
- 1066080 A. E. Whittle, RAFVR.
- 1209640 K. J. Wickham, RAFVR.
- 1255810 J, H. Wiggett, RAFVR.
- 1544493 W. E. Wilcock, RAFVR.
- 646135 J. A. Wilkins.
- 816046 C. Wilkinson, RAFVR.
- 370699 J. E. Wilkinson.
- 534345 G. J. Williams.
- 570024 R. H. Williams.
- 613686 R. D. Willis.
- 1345894 A C. Wilshaw, RAFVR.
- 1171512 A. J Wilson, RAFVR.
- 1009512 J. Wilson, RAFVR.
- 534633 R. Wilson.
- 908829 A. H. W. Wilton, RAFVR.
- 1081894 G. Wingar, RAFVR.
- 983519 T. Wingate, RAFVR.
- 846497 B. G. Wittich, AAF.
- 1091252 C. Wood, RAFVR.
- 970763 N. Wood, RAFVR.
- 909879 W. J. Wood, RAFVR.
- 1154422 A. J. Woodhouse, RAFVR.
- 182849 H. E. Woolgar.
- 1165553 R. W. Wragg, RAFVR.
- 532132 W. Wynn.
- 770800 R. R. Yale, RAFVR.
- 1273747 W. W. Yeates, RAFVR.
- 359015 W. H. V. Young.
- 344896 J. Yule.
- 774126 R. Ziller, RAFVR.

Acting Sergeants

- 1092656 R. G. Baxendale, RAFVR.
- 1287589 T. W. Corrigan, RAFVR.
- 1551260 J. M. Cowell, RAFVR.
- 346959 J. T. Eaton.
- 1615021 O. W. Fletcher, RAFVR.
- 979925 G. F. Fudge, RAFVR.
- 1495478 W. Hackney, RAFVR.
- 628411 D. G. W. Hamersley.
- 349342 A. N. Hollanby.
- 1332557 H. T. W. Houghton, RAFVR.
- 1676332 F. Leadbetter, RAFVR.
- 906606 V. C. Moores, RAFVR.
- 1209416 L. R. Neill, RAFVR.
- 1370010 H. Taylor, RAFVR.
- 1184770 T. E. Tozer, RAFVR.
- 1172008 A. C. Winsor, RAFVR.
- 611236 T. W. Woods.

Corporals

- 1158388 H. de L. Adams, RAFVR.
- 940511 E. R. Addision, RAFVR.
- 154764 W. W. Agley, RAFVR.
- 1558558 J. Airman, RAFVR.
- 1500459 J. W. E. Ainsworth, RAFVR.
- 1250515 S. R. Aldren, RAFVR.
- 1454313 W. M. Alexander, RAFVR.
- 1274159 J. N. Allan, RAFVR.
- 1873888 D. T. H. Allen, RAFVR.
- 1289478 S. C. Allen, RAFVR.
- 625655 W. T. Allen.
- 938244 H. Allin, RAFVR.
- 1239274 F. L. Alsop, RAFVR.
- 841291 J. H. Anderson, RAFVR.
- 921350 S. H. Andrews, RAFVR.
- 904534 P. R. Angell, RAFVR.
- 1146270 E. Ankers, RAFVR.
- 1554986 J. C. Archbold, RAFVR.
- 992828 J. D. Archibald, RAFVR.
- 917633 H. W. Arscott, RAFVR.
- 1123944 L. Armstrong, RAFVR.
- 1172665 J. E. Ashby, RAFVR.
- 1160877 K. H. Ashling, RAFVR.
- 1445646 L. Atkins, RAFVR.
- 1139126 C. Attenborough, RAFVR.
- 1035395 C. Aubrey, RAFVR.
- 1010129 G. E. Aves, RAFVR.
- 985809 W. R. Ayris, RAFVR.
- 1317600 C. H. E. Baker, RAFVR.
- 1298351 F. T. Baker, RAFVR.
- 933102 P. G. Banks, RAFVR.
- 2083724 J. Barker, RAFVR.
- 1498722 J. Barkley, RAFVR.
- 923750 W. J. Barnes, RAFVR.
- 1103720 J. F. Barnett, RAFVR.
- 1014424 A. Y. Barr, RAFVR.
- 149307 G. J. Barrett.
- 1252235 W. R. A. Barrett, RAFVR.
- 1649577 C. R. Barrington, RAFVR.
- 1095519 F. Barrowclough, RAFVR.
- 2245373 A. Bartlett, RAFVR.
- 1023223 E. A. Bartley, RAFVR.
- 620010 G. W. Barton.
- 1152370 R. S. Bass, RAFVR.
- 623689 W. Bastable.
- 1094100 E. Bateman, RAFVR.
- 542347 A. C. Beal.
- 1355777 C. K. Beavan, RAFVR.
- 1633028 O. J. W. Bein, RAFVR.
- 466808 D. R. Bell.
- 1044208 G. D, Bell, RAFVR.
- 547897 J. Bell.
- 1442824 J. W. Belville, RAFVR.
- 1386145 R. W. Bender, RAFVR.
- 964353 D. P. Bennett, RAFVR.
- 1315238 J. Bennett, RAFVR.
- 928302 I. Bennett, RAFVR.
- 1376842 R. A. Berkley, RAFVR.
- 1504474 B. Berresford, RAFVR.
- 1357312 F. G. Bessant, RAFVR.
- 937074 A. E. Bevington, RAFVR.
- 165256 H. H. Biggs.
- 1111531 F. Bignall, RAFVR.
- 1765018 G. Bird, RAFVR.
- 1453193 P. A. Bird, RAFVR.
- 1641799 H. Birchmore, RAFVR.
- 1274099 W. H. Blackburne, RAFVR.
- 1013452 G. Blakie, RAFVR.
- 1105772 K. W. Blissett, RAFVR.
- 903838 H. C. W. Blundell, RAFVR.
- 1187562 R. Boddy, RAFVR.
- 359707 J. R. Bolsover.
- 1211139 J. Bone, RAFVR.
- 702399 A. Bowden, RAFVR.
- 1102190 E. T. Bowen, RAFVR.
- 1617655 L. Bowring, RAFVR.
- 1379722 H. T. Bowron, RAFVR.
- 976965 H. G. Brace, RAFVR.
- 540601 J. Brace.
- 1465611 J. R. Bradford, RAFVR.
- 906644 A. N. Braithwaite, RAFVR.
- 1017864 W. G. Bremner, RAFVR.
- 1172490 E. G. Brimble, RAFVR.
- 1264427 W. E. Brisley, RAFVR.
- 1145287 J. E. R. Broadis, RAFVR.
- 933522 F. W. Brock, RAFVR.
- 1229822 A. Bromhead, RAFVR.
- 1356746 A. W. Brookes, RAFVR.
- 1428997 V. N. W. Broom, RAFVR.
- 1425432 S. A. Brothers, RAFVR.
- 1435829 A. S. Brown, RAFVR.
- 1247663 F. M. Brown, RAFVR.
- 1185479 G. W. Brown, RAFVR.
- 1455268 G. H. Brown, RAFVR.
- 1100214 J. Brown, RAFVR.
- 55359 J. E. Brown.
- 1435572 H. Bromley, RAFVR.
- 1506737 J. R. Brudenell, RAFVR.
- 2027358 L. L. Buffham, RAFVR.
- 515254 W. Bull.
- 942012 E. D. Bullock, RAFVR.
- 637726 J. S. Bullock.
- 1547362 M. Bulmer, RAFVR.
- 1261667 T. W. Burden, RAFVR.
- 1169205 H. K. Burley, RAFVR.
- 1047982 C. W. Burton, RAFVR.
- 983978 F. Burton, RAFVR.
- 1612386 E. B. F. Bussey, RAFVR.
- 591290 G. A. C. Butler.
- 1029961 H. Butters, RAFVR.
- 1628275 R. E. Button, RAFVR.
- 306413 R. G. Calcutt.
- 636737 A. Callaghan.
- 1121448 J. Cameron, RAFVR.
- 971564 R. Campbell, RAFVR.
- 2083431 J. Capewell, RAFVR.
- 1291531 G. E. Carless, RAFVR.
- 1437902 J. H. Carpenter, RAFVR.
- 2043694 D J. B. Carse, RAFVR.
- 1080254 E. Carter, RAFVR.
- 1074816 E. A. Carter, RAFVR.
- 1215764 W. H. Carveth, RAFVR.
- 1008291 A. Cash, RAFVR.
- 1111222 J. Cassels, RAFVR.
- 1284789 G. Castleman, RAFVR.
- 1185798 C. T. J. Chadford, RAFVR.
- 1300647 J. Chandler, RAFVR.
- 1647445 A. P. Chapman, RAFVR.
- 545668 S. W. Chave.
- 1610132 B. K. Cheele, RAFVR.
- 1064483 G. Cheetham, RAFVR.
- 1391239 S. J. O. Chick, RAFVR.
- 1512422 M. C. Chislett, RAFVR.
- 611884 W, R. Christian.
- 1562654 H. G. Church, RAFVR.
- 455762 K. E. Clark.
- 1203713 C. Clarke, RAFVR.
- 1717392 W. N. Clarke, RAFVR.
- 999144 S. W. Claughton, RAFVR.
- 1257340 A. S. G. Cleaver, RAFVR.
- 842361 E. L. Clemens, AAF.
- 976000 R. E. E. Coleman, RAFVR.
- 752113 E. H. Collier, RAFVR.
- 1500543 J. J. Colligan, RAFVR.
- 1208785 T. M. Collinge, RAFVR.
- 978025 H. V. Colson, RAFVR.
- 811178 W. Colville, AAF.
- 1192444 C. Cook, RAFVR.
- 1642373 F. C. Cook, RAFVR.
- 840175 R. A. Cooney, AAF.
- 486756 B. Cooper.
- 1251929 A. E. Coppin, RAFVR.
- 947363 W. F. Copson, RAFVR.
- 979666 R. McA. Cormack, RAFVR.
- 1133367 R. L. Couper, RAFVR.
- 2026480 J. Cowan, RAFVR.
- 1871320 K. W. Cowe, RAFVR.
- 910743 F. Cowell, RAFVR.
- 2064230 R. Cox, RAFVR.
- 903804 W. S. Crees, RAFVR.
- 429376 W. E. Cripps.
- 1019070 A. W. Crossley, RAFVR.
- 1244673 K. S. G. Crowe, RAFVR.
- 1123913 T. A. Crowther, RAFVR.
- 1230336 E. K. Cunningham, RAFVR.
- 1194517 E. Curzon, RAFVR.
- 1457153 D. F. A. Dady, RAFVR.
- 1122084 J. E. Dallas, RAFVR.
- 645557 H. A. Darwin.
- 1610181 H. R. D'Ath, RAFVR.
- 1381894 D. J. Davies, RAFVR.
- 1194894 W. D. Davies, RAFVR.
- 948476 S. Davies, RAFVR.
- 1161732 E. W. Davis, RAFVR.
- 1060723 A. Day, RAFVR.
- 702068 B. A. Deakin, RAFVR.
- 1432476 P. A. Dean, RAFVR.
- 626446 L. M. G. de Chaumont Rambert.
- 1527365 A. J. K. Dennington, RAFVR.
- 1495267 D. Dewis, RAFVR.
- 330450 L. A. Dexter.
- 1202669 R. A. Dilley, RAFVR.
- 1234515 E. Dixon, RAFVR.
- 1009063 T. S. Dixon, RAFVR.
- 1194171 D. Dobson, RAFVR.
- 965307 C. Dodd, RAFVR.
- 13743535 E. Dodd, RAFVR.
- 998356 J. J. Dolman, RAFVR.
- 1047595 E. J. Donnelly, RAFVR.
- 976047 A. Dorrell, RAFVR.
- 1173913 W. A. Dowdeswell, RAFVR.
- 944850 R. L. Drew, RAFVR.
- 634128 A. E. Driver.
- 995152 K. Drury, RAFVR.
- 1213268 G. Dudley, RAFVR.
- 1545098 M. J. A. Dudley, RAFVR.
- 1675959 G. N.Duggan, RAFVR.
- 1334934 A. J. Dunckley, RAFVR.
- 844761 J. Dyer, RAFVR.
- 1024588 H. Dyson, RAFVR.
- 1490010 S. Obourne-Easson, RAFVR.
- 932398 E. R. Eaton, RAFVR.
- 1106916 R. N. Edkins, RAFVR.
- 1167123 F. W. Eele, RAFVR.
- 1203934 B. Eglantine, RAFVR.
- 846256 F. W. Ellement, RAFVR.
- 948523 E. A. Elliot, RAFVR.
- 1108446 G. Elliott, RAFVR.
- 1230904 A. J. Ellis, RAFVR.
- 1045370 C. Hutton-Ellis, RAFVR.
- 1405979 T. L. Ellis, RAFVR.
- 1493351 G. B. F. Elphick, RAFVR.
- 650542 G. S. Elsby.
- 1077618 F. Embley, RAFVR.
- 752281 S. E. English, RAFVR.
- 1103141 C. Evans, RAFVR.
- 452018 J. Eve.
- 1178641 R. K. Everett, RAFVR.
- 1302918 W. G. Falconer, RAFVR.
- 933108 D. S. Fennell, RAFVR.
- 1244367 W. E. Fenney, RAFVR.
- 1145750 K. J. C. Ferguson, RAFVR.
- 1045000 R. B. Fiddes, RAFVR.
- 939251 E. Fielding, RAFVR.
- 1095074 N. Fitton, RAFVR.
- 1160692 R. Floyd, RAFVR.
- 645009 C. W. Ford.
- 1017612 W. M. Forsyth, RAFVR.
- 1138255 E. H. Franks, RAFVR.
- 526387 G. R. Franks.
- 977561 A. Fraser, RAFVR.
- 2044692 E. B. Fraser, RAFVR.
- 1409472 J. G. Frearson, RAFVR.
- 1467037 T. F. Frenchum, RAFVR.
- 1274113 F. B. Frost, RAFVR.
- 1051319 W. A. Frost, RAFVR.
- 645210 L. Fryer.
- 1210496 T. H. Fuller, RAFVR.
- 1009327 A. K. Fullwood, RAFVR.
- 630555 J. W. Fyfe.
- 1404574 T. A. E. Gadd, RAFVR.
- 630272 W. E. Gaffin.
- 497759 H. Galley, RAFVR.
- 1248354 C. E. Gandy, RAFVR.
- 1391808 F. W. Gapes, RAFVR.
- 1109386 H. Gasston, RAFVR.
- 452901 G. A. Gavzey.
- 1373046 A. Geddes, RAFVR.
- 1234728 A. W. Geese, RAFVR.
- 1413783 W. J. Gerard, RAFVR.
- 1032484 F. Gibson, RAFVR.
- 1374858 T. Gilroy, RAFVR.
- 1396447 A. W. Gingell, RAFVR.
- 1088060 E. Gisborne, RAFVR.
- 1267210 H. R. H. Glister, RAFVR.
- 539217 W. J. Glover.
- 1178061 A. Gordon, RAFVR.
- 1158613 A. W. Gould, RAFVR.
- 1750610 S. S. Gould, RAFVR.
- 995916 J. Goulden, RAFVR.
- 1526631 J. W. Graham, RAFVR.
- 1670907 C. B. Grant, RAFVR.
- 1155358 W. V. Gravestck, RAFVR.
- 1109263 J. Green, RAFVR.
- 1289202 G. R. Green, RAFVR.
- 1118730 S. Green, RAFVR.
- 617029 K. H. Greenslade.
- 1019073 E. H. Greggor, RAFVR.
- 1185943 L. T. Grievson, RAFVR.
- 1272992 B. J. Griffiths, RAFVR.
- 1185184 J. H. Grindley, RAFVR.
- 641303 G. D. Grouse.
- 2088314 N. Gudgeon, RAFVR.
- 937586 J. C. Gunn, RAFVR.
- 1026829 L. V. Gunnill, RAFVR.
- 1355673 E. G. Guster, RAFVR.
- 1102944 N. H. Gutteridge, RAFVR.
- 536544 H. J. Haffey.
- 908053 N. E. R. Hale, RAFVR.
- 1406592 D. J. Hall, RAFVR.
- 1507058 H. Hall, RAFVR.
- 1018924 G. I. Hamer, RAFVR.
- 1048919 J. Hammersley, RAFVR.
- 615994 R. E. Hammond.
- 970621 K. Hanson, RAFVR.
- 1619092 S. R. Harding, RAFVR.
- 1351696 A. Harkness, RAFVR.
- 1157168 H. H. Harper, RAFVR.
- 1001683 A. N. R. Harris, RAFVR.
- 1414399 S. Harris, RAFVR.
- 1429238 R. C. W. Harrison, RAFVR.
- 926278 H. J. Harrow, RAFVR.
- 2076435 P. Harvey, RAFVR.
- 702591 A. R. S. Hastings, RAFVR.
- 778051 M. Hauptfleisch, RAFVR.
- 1414180 H. E. Hawkes, RAFVR.
- 912528 A. V. Haynes, RAFVR.
- 917080 A. F. L. Hayward, RAFVR.
- 1127286 W. Haywood, RAFVR.
- 509326 A. J. J. Haworth.
- 1014133 J. P. Hazell, RAFVR.
- 1274606 A. V. P. Hellyer, RAFVR.
- 1102481 G. Hendry, RAFVR.
- 1331928 E. R. Herrington, RAFVR.
- 1482169 F. Hesleton, RAFVR.
- 987672 F. A. Hewitt, RAFVR.
- 1222980 N. F. Hicks, RAFVR.
- 982679 W. G. Higham, RAFVR.
- 1452250 P. H. Hill, RAFVR.
- 1272569 W. T. Hillage, RAFVR.
- 750269 F. H. Hills, RAFVR.
- 1018030 C. Hirst, RAFVR.
- 1257783 W. T. Hoadley, RAFVR.
- 2030372 H. M. Hoather, RAFVR.
- 532415 G. M. Hobson.
- 995575 F. Hodge, RAFVR.
- 1100029 A. Hogg, RAFVR.
- 1346206 D. Holborn, RAFVR.
- 1380417 F. J. Holder, RAFVR.
- 1308635 A. V. Holloway, RAFVR.
- 1148416 F. Horner, RAFVR.
- 1437875 S. Hounsell, RAFVR.
- 1192039 F. H. Howcutt, RAFVR.
- 1169441 M. H. Howell, RAFVR.
- 1519106 C. T. Howells, RAFVR.
- 1146133 D. Howitt, RAFVR.
- 819163 B. J. Humphrey, AAF.
- 1088835 D. W. Hunt, RAFVR.
- 1128172 W. G. W. Hunt, RAFVR.
- 1103275 D. R. Hurley, RAFVR.
- 624928 W. G. Hurley.
- 1648877 B. A. Hurrell, RAFVR.
- 1060690 H. Hutchinson, RAFVR.
- 1139706 C. L. Hydes, RAFVR.
- 1508184 R. Irvine, RAFVR.
- 1564810 A. Jackson, RAFVR.
- 1634629 A. J. Jackson, RAFVR.
- 1243223 F. G. Jackson, RAFVR.
- 1639355 H. Jackson, RAFVR.
- 1102972 L. Jackson, RAFVR.
- 1084066 S. Jackson, RAFVR.
- 1548525 W. H. Jarvis, RAFVR.
- 1167354 C. A. James, RAFVR.
- 1011777 D. Jeens, RAFVR.
- 1104209 J. J. Jenkins, RAFVR.
- 528706 W. A. Jenkinson.
- 1165169 L. A. Jennings, RAFVR.
- 861119 J. Jenvey, RAFVR.
- 546178 J. W. Jephson.
- 1478265 D. Jewkes, RAFVR.
- 1490850 A. Jodrell, RAFVR.
- 1178368 A. E. S. Johnson, RAFVR.
- 1464922 C. A. V. Johnson, RAFVR.
- 1557081 A. L. Johnston, RAFVR.
- 111.1293 R. A. Johnston, RAFVR.
- 799846 E. Jollands, RAFVR.
- 954139 G. Jones, RAFVR.
- 574204 H. V. Butler-Jones.
- 982828 I. Jones, RAFVR.
- 1517824 J. E. Gower-Jones, RAFVR.
- 1051906 J. L. Jones, RAFVR.
- 1115815 K. Jones, RAFVR.
- 1863850 V. C. Jones, RAFVR.
- 1067607 T. Jordan, RAFVR.
- 922693 B. E. H. Joy, RAFVR.
- 544833 J. D. Joyner.
- 1374515 G. S. Kay, RAFVR.
- 919600 H. H. J. Keech, RAFVR.
- 1663293 H. C. Keel, RAFVR.
- 651151 L. H. Keen.
- 908945 J. B. Keene, RAFVR.
- 1541556 J. Kelly, RAFVR.
- 1007878 A. Kemp, RAFVR.
- 1643901 W. Kenny, RAFVR.
- 915720 H. H. Kenton, RAFVR.
- 926271 J. A. Kibble, RAFVR.
- 1563982 R. Pi King, RAFVR.
- 960333 A. H. W. Kingham, RAFVR.
- 1095459 A. E. Kings, RAFVR.
- 1037416 L. F. Kirkup, RAFVR.
- 1003967 R. S. Kitchen, RAFVR.
- 1130242 C. A. J. Knife, RAFVR.
- 1065774 H. M. Laban, RAFVR.
- 1503383 H. H. Lacey, RAFVR.
- 1013553 J. D. Lamb, RAFVR.
- 1262091 D. S. Lamble, RAFVR.
- 1230701 A. G. Lancaster, RAFVR.
- 966899 J. Latto, RAFVR.
- 1401030 D. J. Laurenson, RAFVR.
- 1478713 E. W. Lawrence, RAFVR.
- 339514 C. Lawlor.
- 1506164 D. W. Lawson, RAFVR.
- 634619 N. Laycock.
- 1321044 C. Leach, RAFVR.
- 1380655 L. P. H. Leach, RAFVR.
- 2065859 A. I. K. Leanan, RAFVR.
- 1113186 E. G. Lee, RAFVR.
- 997861 W. C. Lees, RAFVR.
- 1104284 E. Leng, RAFVR.
- 747589 L. R. Liddiard, RAFVR.
- 1143466 G. F. Lidgett, RAFVR.
- 1617130 A. c. Lilley, RAFVR.
- 746299 H. G. Lincoln, RAFVR.
- 1276009 R. Lister, RAFVR.
- 908397 D. J. Little, RAFVR.
- 972158 J. Lloyd, RAFVR.
- 1057732 R. Lockwood, RAFVR.
- 1057377 F. Lomas, RAFVR.
- 1459093 I. F. Long, RAFVR.
- 1173489 A. G. Lovegrove, RAFVR.
- 1016301 C. G. Lowes, RAFVR.
- 966699 R. G. Lovett, RAFVR.
- 1441041 E. J. Luney, RAFVR.
- 962976 A. H. Lyons, RAFVR.
- 1435543 E. F. McCarthy, RAFVR.
- 1137424 W. McClure, RAFVR.
- 969447 H. McDonald, RAFVR.
- 1106837 A. McDougal, RAFVR.
- 1101965 J. McElhaney, RAFVR.
- 1348376 G. MacFarlane, RAFVR.
- 1531578 S. McGaw, RAFVR.
- 551642 J. H. A. W. McKean.
- 971678 K. MacKenzie, RAFVR.
- 1373316 T. McNab, RAFVR.
- 1370170 D. M. McRae, RAFVR.
- 1129717 L. Major, RAFVR.
- 1048617 S. Mallaghan, RAFVR.
- 1093505 J. E. Maltby, RAFVR.
- 771882 R. L. Mansfield, RAFVR.
- 910034 D. C. Marsh, RAFVR.
- 1197632 I. W. Marsh, RAFVR.
- 770789 G. S. Martin, RAFVR.
- 1064950 J. Martin, RAFVR.
- 964771 R. C. I. Martin, RAFVR.
- 1256668 G. D. Mason, RAFVR.
- 1455706 S. R. S. Mead, RAFVR.
- 980879 N. Meadow, RAFVR.
- 2060041 E. Middleton, RAFVR.
- 624475 M. Millar.
- 1368767 G. C. Millen, RAFVR.
- 1463556 A. T. Miller, RAFVR.
- .1500847 V. S. Mills, RAFVR.
- 1326812 A. Mitchell, RAFVR.
- 1017498 W. Mitchell, RAFVR.
- 1111593 J. J. B. Molland, RAFVR.
- 1271082 A. Moore, RAFVR.
- 632843 C. G. Moore.
- 752609 E. L. Moore, RAFVR.
- 1297566 A. Morgan, RAFVR.
- 2133632 L. M. Morony, RAFVR.
- 901535 F. G. Morris, RAFVR.
- 1021841 J. Morrison, RAFVR.
- 915998 J. Morton, RAFVR.
- 973339 T. P. Moss, RAFVR.
- 938964 F. T. Mould, RAFVR.
- 975632 J. L. Mullett, RAFVR.
- 552283 J. Muncie.
- 514721 J. W. S. Mutch.
- 482855 Y. Naphthali.
- 919415 H. Q. Nash, RAFVR.
- 1190178 B. R. Nelson, RAFVR.
- 1088769 E. Nelson, RAFVR.
- 900640 F. S. Newman, RAFVR.
- 1448185 J. W. Newman, RAFVR.
- 1100575 A. R. Nice, RAFVR.
- 1300750 F. Nicholls, RAFVR.
- 1114682 V. R. Nicholls, RAFVR.
- 1697933 J. B. Nixon, RAFVR.
- 1865659 J. A. Nonk, RAFVR.
- 920487 W. H. Norman, RAFVR.
- 2001016 V. D. R. North, RAFVR.
- 1074489 D. Gates, RAFVR.
- 97724 S. L. J. Oborn.
- 1085315 A. R. Ody, RAFVR.
- 955922 J. E. Offord, RAFVR.
- 453257 P. M. O'Flanagan.
- 1154552 E. A. Oram, RAFVR.
- 1218295 G. H. Orman, RAFVR.
- 624607 E. Orrell.
- 1154299 I. R. Owen, RAFVR.
- 1455539 W. C. Packham, RAFVR.
- 1489602 A. D. Paget, RAFVR.
- 1046595 G. Painter, RAFVR.
- 1214333 F. W. Parker, RAFVR.
- 1422267 H. T. Parry, RAFVR.
- 2084515 F, J. M. Parsons, RAFVR.
- 954999 R. J. Partridge, RAFVR.
- 865017 T. A. Paskins.
- 537570 D. Peacock.
- 1690772 D. Peden, RAFVR.
- 1552483 A P. Peggie, RAFVR.
- 1017621 E. Pennington, RAFVR.
- 577572 H. J. D. Perkins.
- 1448494 F. E. Perrisset, RAFVR.
- 1212821 S. M. Perry, RAFVR.
- 937870 C. J. Peters, RAFVR.
- 1406865 T. R. Peters, RAFVR.
- 1194946 A. C. Phelps, RAFVR.
- 520919 R. W. Philipson.
- 573290 F. Phillips.
- 639710 W. S. Piggin.
- 1614829 N. H. Pigott, RAFVR.
- 968617 J. M. Pollock, RAFVR.
- 1360519 M. Porter, RAFVR.
- 1172470 M. V. Potter, RAFVR.
- 1442476 G. J. Poulton, RAFVR.
- 1478148 S. L. Pragnell, RAFVR.
- 1446729 G. E. Pratt, RAFVR.
- 1017281 J. E. Proom, RAFVR.
- 1282491 A. V. C. Pyne, RAFVR.
- 1385649 D. H. C. Quinn, RAFVR.
- 1302742 S. Ramsden, RAFVR.
- 508605 S. Ramsey.
- 1115489 C. Ratcliffe, RAFVR.
- 1144660 V. Ratcliffe, RAFVR.
- 1256660 C. A. Raven, RAFVR.
- 1101729 S. P. Ray, RAFVR.
- 963716 J. E. Raynor, RAFVR.
- 1278560 C. F. Read, RAFVR.
- 979795 L. G. Reffell, RAFVR.
- 1547956 F. A. Remnant, RAFVR.
- 1252457 M. J. Richards, RAFVR.
- 1534790 H. W. Richardson, RAFVR.
- 1066892 J. R. Richardson, RAFVR.
- 860369 G. R. Riches, AAF.
- 770708 F. A. Rivaz, RAFVR.
- 1123301 J. W. Roberson, RAFVR.
- 849868 P. J. Roberts, AAF.
- 1020775 A. H. Robinson, RAFVR.
- 983140 J. L. Robinson, RAFVR.
- 1426122 E. V. Robson, RAFVR.
- 1490655 W. Root, RAFVR.
- 1057888 F. C. M. Ross, RAFVR.
- 1161963 J. Rossiter, RAFVR.
- 1223128 C. A. Rouse, RAFVR.
- 911946 M. Rowbottom, RAFVR.
- 1402889 R. S. Rowe, RAFVR.
- 336518 S. Rowlands.
- 1286348 R. W. Rudge, RAFVR.
- 1641874 L. F. Rush, RAFVR.
- 1063428 D. W. Russell, RAFVR.
- 1069254 L. L. Russell, RAFVR.
- 900285 T. Russell, RAFVR.
- 1107365 M. E. Rutter, RAFVR.
- 1154936 C. S. Ryan, RAFVR.
- 1325913 R. Sagar, RAFVR.
- 912843 A. H. Sainsbury, RAFVR.
- 972467 J. L. Sanderson, RAFVR.
- 1166052 A. F. S. Sault, RAFVR
- 1683466 G. W. Saville, RAFVR.
- 1081291 W. Scarrow, RAFVR.
- 1000571 W. Scattergood, RAFVR.
- 776737 J. Scerri, RAFVR.
- 1025046 H. D. Schofield, RAFVR.
- 1494750 E. Scholes, RAFVR.
- 1517982 R. C. Scully, RAFVR.
- 646202 G. Seal.
- 1100704 G. M. Shackleton, RAFVR.
- 1188654 W. H. Shade, RAFVR.
- 994559 A. G. Sharpe, RAFVR.
- 618550 S. Sharples.
- 1240678 C. L. Shaw, RAFVR.
- 1253022 A. A. Shrubsole, RAFVR.
- 1539697 C. A. Simms, RAFVR.
- 1561705 J. Simpson, RAFVR.
- 1079665 R. Simpson, RAFVR.
- 2027797 D. E. Skelsey, RAFVR.
- 989340 E. Skelton, RAFVR.
- 1534979 H. E. Smart, RAFVR.
- 1225478 J. C. Smart, RAFVR.
- 962076 D. G. Smith, RAFVR.
- 1273719 E. G. Smith, RAFVR.
- 973332 F. S. Smith, RAFVR.
- 1100781 T. Smith, RAFVR.
- 307139 J. A. Smith, RAFVR.
- 1236052 K. A. W. Smith, RAFVR
- 1620406 P. S. V. Smith, RAFVR.
- 651597 R. Smith.
- 338747 W. H. Smith.
- 1140074 J. Somerfield, RAFVR.
- 1015872 W. Southworth, RAFVR.
- 849194 W. Spencer, AAF.
- 964234 A. C. F. Spinks, RAFVR.
- 940530 A. R. Spooner, RAFVR.
- 1177353 J. R. Spring, RAFVR
- 1057885 H. Spry, RAFVR.
- 847056 R. H. J. Stanfield, AAF.
- 995462 D. W. Stephenson, RAFVR.
- 1426742 A. G. Stevens, RAFVR.
- 639828 O. E. Stevenson.
- 1371656 R. Stewart, RAFVR.
- 994851 R. C. Stewart, RAFVR.
- 912478 F. W. Stickels, RAFVR
- 924932 S. D. Stone, RAFVR.
- 1525443 H. T. Straw, RAFVR.
- 925057 H. J. Stroud, RAFVR.
- 1286040 J. F. Surtees, RAFVR.
- 953701 H. C. Swinden, RAFVR.
- 901375 G. H. Symonds, RAFVR.
- 1411015 E. C. Tall, RAFVR.
- 1165640 A. C. Tansley, RAFVR.
- 1618618 W. Tapper, RAFVR.
- 1429703 H. S. Taylor, RAFVR.
- 632400 W. Taylor.
- 1127438 C. E. Thomas, RAFVR.
- 1245211 C. W. Thomas, RAFVR.
- 985235 E. Thomas, RAFVR.
- 927071 G. A. Thomas, RAFVR.
- 1541004 A. Thomasson, RAFVR.
- 433080 E. F. Thomson.
- 1427026 A. W. Thompson, RAFVR.
- 911788 L. G. Thurston, RAFVR.
- 1627698 A. J. Tibble, RAFVR.
- 961104 J. K. J.Tiley, RAFVR.
- 1150157 J. W. Tipton, RAFVR.
- 1090782 W. R. Toms, RAFVR.
- 979542 R. Towers, RAFVR.
- 1430215 W. Trafford, RAFVR.
- 1275444 F. Trebilcock, RAFVR.
- 1611800 C. Tree, RAFVR.
- 1114518 G. Trimnell, RAFVR.
- 865058 A. H. H. Tucker.
- 756093 R. H. Tuffs, RAFVR.
- 1017180 H. Turner, RAFVR.
- 1170805 D. R. Uphill, RAFVR.
- 545824 J. Upton.
- 1117720 S. Vernon, RAFVR.
- 644072 A. F. Walker.
- 1441257 D. F. Walker, RAFVR.
- 1133911 J. C. Walker, RAFVR.
- 1624575 M. N. Walker, RAFVR.
- 1052815 G. Wallace, RAFVR.
- 1519153 J. R. Walshe, RAFVR.
- 643405 F. H. Ward.
- 1309840 H. E. Ward, RAFVR.
- 1084552 F. L. Warne, RAFVR.
- 1120602 J. A. Warnock, RAFVR.
- 1073059 J. H. Warters, RAFVR.
- 1487341 G. Watkins, RAFVR.
- 1009333 E. H. Watson, RAFVR.
- 1828496 G. K. Watson, RAFVR.
- 1250733 W. F. V. Webb, RAFVR.
- 1211563 R. H. Webber, RAFVR.
- 1236735 R. W. Welham, RAFVR.
- 1512598 H. Wellock, RAFVR.
- 1270377 G. H. Welsh, RAFVR.
- 2065577 R. Weston, RAFVR.
- 2115307 E. L. Whiston, RAFVR.
- 1082576 A. E. T. White, RAFVR.
- 11913200. G. White, RAFVR.
- 1253678 L. C. White, RAFVR.
- 1532417 R. Whiteley, RAFVR.
- 951641 E. R. Whittaker, RAFVR.
- 928534 S. R. Wilding, RAFVR.
- 644246 J. C. Wilkinson.
- 915890 C. D. Williams, RAFVR.
- 1240991 D. J. Williams, RAFVR.
- 980918 S. B. H. Williams, RAFVR.
- 1064595 C. H. Williams, RAFVR.
- 1478097 T. Williamson, RAFVR.
- 1208355 D. E. Willis, RAFVR.
- 1167193 H. S. Willis, RAFVR.
- 1053744 A. Wilson, RAFVR.
- 986599 G. Wilson, RAFVR.
- 1189929 W. Wilson, RAFVR.
- 1078160 W. A. Wilson, RAFVR.
- 1286036 K. S. Winder, RAFVR.
- 1612202 A. E. Winskell, RAFVR.
- 269513 H. Winter.
- 1636107 S. T. Winter, RAFVR.
- 618561 S. Withers.
- 927555 R. J. C. Wood, RAFVR.
- 1022087 H. V. F. Woodford, RAFVR.
- 869424 F. Woodhead, AAF.
- 1015624 C. V. Woodward, RAFVR.
- 1523417 R. Wraith, RAFVR.
- 635415 A. Wright.
- 1089933 H. Wright, RAFVR.
- 1052791 J. Wright, RAFVR
- 1095360 J. Young, RAFVR.

Acting Corporals

- 1253482 V. E. Barnes, RAFVR.
- 1669462 R. H. Brain, RAFVR.
- 1636357 G. H. Hamp, RAFVR.
- 1068710 J. Heaford, RAFVR.
- 1223413 S. H. C. Kopp, RAFVR.

Leading Aircraftmen

- 1218978 A. T. Ackroyd, RAFVR.
- 1652157 A. L. Adams, RAFVR.
- 1702026 G. D. Addis, RAFVR.
- 817297 V. A. Allardyce, AAF.
- 1408484 A. D. Allen, RAFVR.
- 1000599 H. Archer, RAFVR.
- 1862144 E. Archibald, RAFVR.
- 1203325 B. N. Ash, RAFVR.
- 650833 D. Baglow.
- 1385819 J. Bainbridge, RAFVR.
- 1161097 A. Ball, RAFVR.
- 1470084 R. M. Bannister, RAFVR.
- 1285019 J. E. Barclay, RAFVR.
- 963668 J. A. Barker, RAFVR.
- 1246564 A. G. Beauchamp, RAFVR.
- 1663011 E. Beetham, RAFVR.
- 747456 H. Bell, RAFVR.
- 1834746 W. E. Bendall, RAFVR.
- 1068818 R. M. Bennett, RAFVR.
- 1046881 T. B. Bennett, RAFVR.
- 1028137 A. Bentley, RAFVR.
- 1659916 A. Bernini, RAFVR.
- 1210587 W. Bexton, RAFVR.
- 1196691 J. Biddle, RAFVR.
- 1114556 J. A. H. Biggar, RAFVR.
- 1391281 R. Bignell, RAFVR.
- 1105267 J. F. Binns, RAFVR.
- 1632645 F. J. Blackler, RAFVR,
- 1080135 F. A. Blake, RAFVR.
- 1429344 F. Boulter, RAFVR.
- 1507210 D. B. Bowker, RAFVR.
- 913396 D. G. Boyd, RAFVR.
- 1619979 G. A. Bray, RAFVR.
- 995751 L. F. Bray, RAFVR.
- 1222911 E. R. J. Brockett, RAFVR.
- 1664185 S. Brocklehurst, RAFVR.
- 1245062 J. D. Bromley, RAFVR.
- 1361364 G. Brooksbank, RAFVR.
- 1518344 C. Brumpton, RAFVR.
- 1502790 J. Bullock, RAFVR.
- 1401016 A. G. Burgess, RAFVR.
- 1653213 J. Burton, RAFVR.
- 932505 N. Burton, RAFVR.
- 1573352 R. Calleder, RAFVR.
- 1680329 G. Campbell, RAFVR.
- 1341521 J. K. Campbell, RAFVR.
- 1528374 A. R. Cawthorne, RAFVR.
- 1467603 F. C. Chandler, RAFVR.
- 1379423 A. L. Chapman, RAFVR.
- 1155693 A. H. J. Chapman, RAFVR.
- 1088789 J. W. Chapman, RAFVR.
- 1131250 T. E. Chappell, RAFVR.
- 1094343 J. H. Chatterton, RAFVR.
- 1295570 E. B. Chowns, RAFVR.
- 1470993 G. Church, RAFVR.
- 1882093 T. Clarke, RAFVR.
- 1482275 F. Clayton, RAFVR.
- 931450 A. B. Clements, RAFVR.
- 1219732 R. A. S. Cload, RAFVR.
- 1795032 R. Cobain, RAFVR.
- 1052743 P. M. Cocker, RAFVR.
- 1666947 W. C. Cole, RAFVR.
- 2162670 H. E. Coll, RAFVR.
- 1018832 S. Collins, RAFVR.
- 1478237 A. T. Conrad, RAFVR.
- 1257485 C. H. J. Copeland, RAFVR.
- 1449398 E. A. Costard, RAFVR.
- 1409276 J. Cotton, RAFVR.
- 1634435 W. Cottrell, RAFVR.
- 1456716 D. E. Coughlan, RAFVR.
- 106886 M. H. Coward.
- 752039 C. J. Cresswell, RAFVR.
- 1470555 E.G. Cropper, RAFVR.
- 1386654 M. L. Cropper, RAFVR.
- 1468491 J. F. Crosbie, RAFVR.
- 1683797 P. H. Crowther, RAFVR.
- 1693374 J. V. Cupit, RAFVR.
- 578521 A. G. Curd.
- 1374495 D. S. Curr, RAFVR.
- 1341946 W. Currie, RAFVR.
- 1342788 J. M. Davidson, RAFVR.
- 932723 D. H. Davies, RAFVR.
- 1464779 D. J. Davies, RAFVR.
- 1803551 G. A. Davies, RAFVR.
- 1103399 H. Davies, RAFVR.
- 1665031 W. I. Davies, RAFVR.
- 1411093 G. F. Deakin, RAFVR.
- 1690029 A. Denholm, RAFVR.
- 1340949 H. Devine, RAFVR.
- 1017968 T. Dibb, RAFVR.
- 1835410 G. W. Dick, RAFVR.
- 1610241 A. Dickson, RAFVR.
- 1045745 F. Dickson, RAFVR.
- 1418368 A. G. Dignan, RAFVR.
- 1279502 W. G. Dix, RAFVR.
- 1248738 F. C. Dixey, RAFVR.
- 1398979 K. N. Dobbs, RAFVR.
- 1340078 H. Dougan, RAFVR.
- 1177481 J. T. Dowding, RAFVR.
- 989973 A. Draper, RAFVR.
- 1773027 W. Dudley, RAFVR.
- 1896806 R. W. Dunce, RAFVR.
- 1661010 W. Dyer, RAFVR.
- 1352612 A. C. Edgecombe, RAFVR.
- 1239258 G. W. Edmonson, RAFVR.
- 1161602 A. J. Edwards, RAFVR.
- 1558035 M. M. Ellerby, RAFVR.
- 1286234 H. A. Ellis, RAFVR.
- 2247299 H. Elvin, RAFVR.
- 3010328 A. H. J. Eplett, RAFVR.
- 955343 S. E. Evans, RAFVR.
- 1870381 G. E. S. Everill, RAFVR.
- 1149070 W. A. Ewart, RAFVR.
- 1044204 W. Fairbank, RAFVR.
- 1157202 V. S. Faux, RAFVR.
- 1225881 D. V. Fendt, RAFVR.
- 1140563 J. A. Fisher, RAFVR.
- 1507742 H. Foster, RAFVR.
- 1076550 H. Fowler, RAFVR.
- 955356 J. W. Fox, RAFVR.
- 926518 E. W. Francis, RAFVR.
- 1356351 J. J. Francis, RAFVR.
- 1429049 F. J. P. Freebody, RAFVR,
- 1760222 W. F. French, RAFVR.
- 1664246 W. J. French, RAFVR.
- 1465645 J. Frost, RAFVR.
- 1223886 R. C. Fry, RAFVR.
- 1251029 R. George, RAFVR.
- 1371216 E. Gerrard, RAFVR.
- 1340881 R. B. Gillies, RAFVR.
- 1170093 M. Ginn, RAFVR.
- 1476279 C. Glenton, RAFVR.
- 1019084 J. K. Goldsmith, RAFVR.
- 1178059 N. A. Gooch, RAFVR.
- 1469308 C. F. Gower, RAFVR.
- 1099730 T. Graham, RAFVR.
- 1126791 N. Grant, RAFVR.
- 1274203 W. A. Green, RAFVR.
- 1652536 H. Greenall, RAFVR.
- 1873139 D. J. Griffiths, RAFVR.
- 1850330 C. W. H. Hackwill, RAFVR.
- 1295369 E. J. Hadaway, RAFVR.
- 1662061 J. G. T. Hall, RAFVR.
- 938684 K. H. Hall, RAFVR.
- 1538002 W. A. Hall, RAFVR.
- 1383188 P. G. Hammock, RAFVR.
- 1317578 G. E. Harper, RAFVR.
- 1540460 N. Harrison, RAFVR.
- 1639270 H. T. Harrold, RAFVR.
- 1189061 R. O. Hawes, RAFVR.
- 1216137 J. L. L. Hayward, RAFVR.
- 1633731 J. H. Henderson, RAFVR.
- 1485151 E. C. G. Hewson, RAFVR.
- 1244575 P. J. Hibben, RAFVR.
- 1120878 H. Higginbothom, RAFVR.
- 701977 A. F. Hill, RAFVR.
- 1862979 J. O. Hilton, RAFVR.
- 1151490 H. W. Hindmarsh, RAFVR,
- 1193019 W. H. Hines, RAFVR.
- 1354471 K. S. Hives, RAFVR.
- 1228899 J. S. Holden, RAFVR.
- 1221299 E. J. Hood, RAFVR.
- 1524734 F. Hopgood, RAFVR.
- 1442974 R. O. Hopkins, RAFVR.
- 1540753 V. Horridge, RAFVR.
- 1610416 G. B. Horton, RAFVR.
- 980648 T. W. Hotchkiss, RAFVR.
- 1689983 D. W. Howden, RAFVR.
- 1032411 E. Humphreys, RAFVR.
- 1029718 R. J. Humphreys, RAFVR.
- 1104472 D. Hunter, RAFVR.
- 1124097 J. Hush, RAFVR.
- 1658521 J. V. Hussell, RAFVR.
- 1821074 C. A. Ingham, RAFVR.
- 1204774 N. Isaacs, RAFVR.
- 1368847 A. Jackson, RAFVR.
- 1033736 R. E. Jane, RAFVR.
- 1646102 J. W. W. Jeakins, RAFVR.
- 1302112 H. I. John, RAFVR.
- 1478036 H. R. Johnson, RAFVR.
- 1268847 P. Johnson, RAFVR.
- 860436 R. A. Johnson, AAF.
- 1438581 G. W. Johnston, RAFVR.
- 1179096 E. M. Jones, RAFVR.
- 1298899 E. R. Jones, RAFVR.
- 2208773 F. W. E. Jones, RAFVR.
- 1755114 G. R. Jones, RAFVR.
- 1376630 H. W. Jones, RAFVR.
- 1288477 E. Jones, RAFVR.
- 977801 R. Jones, RAFVR.
- 1658540 W. J. Jones, RAFVR.
- 1074831 M. A. Jubb, RAFVR.
- 1080612 R. Kay, RAFVR.
- 1690789 A. M. Kelvie, RAFVR.
- 1213045 G. Kidby, RAFVR.
- 840937 C. B. Kingston, AAF.
- 1208055 W. D. Knowler, RAFVR.
- 2208055 F. Knowles, RAFVR.
- 907055 H. E. Ladd, RAFVR.
- 999166 H. Lavekack, RAFVR.
- 1341985 G. B. Lawson, RAFVR.
- 650785 G. V. Lay.
- 1088357 J. Lea, RAFVR.
- 1481115 D. Leathley, RAFVR.
- 1674438 H. N. Lee, RAFVR.
- 1648186 J. R. Leftley, RAFVR.
- 1128312 N. Leigh, RAFVR.
- 1614035 Y. Levene, RAFVR.
- 1284658 H. Lewis, RAFVR.
- 1197069 B. C. Lewis, RAFVR.
- 1451414 E. J. Lewry, RAFVR.
- 920600 L. T. Linsdell, RAFVR.
- 1864809 W. Lintott, RAFVR.
- 1468802 A. W. Lister, RAFVR.
- 1506210 G. E. Littleboy, RAFVR.
- 1131013 C. H. Liversedge, RAFVR.
- 2207869 J. D. Lonsdale, RAFVR.
- 1629478 E. C. Lowrie, RAFVR.
- 1208028 F. C. A. McBain, RAFVR.
- 1036402 J. McBurney, RAFVR.
- 1274821 J. C. McColl, RAFVR.
- 1551488 R. McCullum, RAFVR.
- 816179 W. McDevitt, AAF.
- 1103899 J. Macdonald, RAFVR.
- 1012758 M. McGregor, RAFVR.
- 1075943 E. McHendrie, RAFVR.
- 1345748 R. McLeod, RAFVR.
- 1344966 A. I. McQueen, RAFVR.
- 524148 E. T. D. Machell.
- 1015705 L. E. Males, RAFVR.
- 1659473 S. Mancey, RAFVR.
- 1161320 H. Mansbridge, RAFVR.
- 1138195 J. C. Marrington, RAFVR.
- 1605729 S. G. Marshall, RAFVR.
- 1300281 J. B. Martel, RAFVR.
- 2226235 T. Mather, RAFVR.
- 933278 R. J. Matthews, RAFVR.
- 1104805 L. A. Mayo, RAFVR.
- 1511174 J. J. Meally, RAFVR.
- 1284507 F. R. Milchard, RAFVR.
- 1367658 J. Mill, RAFVR.
- 1441859 I. F. Miller, RAFVR.
- 1261846 W. G. Miller, RAFVR.
- 1611746 A. E. Milligan, RAFVR.
- 1006253 C. Mitchell, RAFVR.
- 1530660 W. Moffett, RAFVR.
- 1007734 R. Molyneux, RAFVR.
- 1866205 A. E. Moon, RAFVR.
- 1394508 B. Morgan, RAFVR.
- 1469049 J. Morris, RAFVR.
- 1428519 J. H. Morris, RAFVR.
- 1029013 J. Murphy, RAFVR.
- 1122952 E. Naylor, RAFVR.
- 1617887 L. Neal, RAFVR.
- 1870484 H. Neaves, RAFVR.
- 1046242 J. A. Nicholson, RAFVR.
- 1130427 G. H. Ogle, RAFVR.
- 1408276 K. J. M. J. O'Kelly, RAFVR.
- 1643410 E. T. Olrod, RAFVR.
- 2213831 A. W. B. P. O'Shea, RAFVR.
- 963092 N. G. Overington, RAFVR.
- 1645151 L. G. Overton, RAFVR.
- 2246091 G. Owen, RAFVR.
- 977820 P. H. C. J. Tudor-Owen, RAFVR.
- 1409550 A. E. Paddon, RAFVR.
- 1441552 W. R. Page, RAFVR.
- 1275052 W. R. Palmer, RAFVR.
- 1230617 A. R. Parker, RAFVR.
- 1408412 A. S. Rowing-Parker, RAFVR.
- 1530372 W. J. Parker, RAFVR.
- 2235433 S. M. Parkin, RAFVR.
- 1279668 K. R. Parnell, RAFVR.
- 1099671 R. Parr, RAFVR.
- 1680565 N. C. Parry, RAFVR.
- 1091440 M. Parsons, RAFVR.
- 1477845 W. J. Patchett, RAFVR.
- 1070707 W. Pate, RAFVR.
- 1665413 G. L. Payten, RAFVR.
- 1216329 C. Peacock, RAFVR.
- 1522447 C. A. Peat, RAFVR.
- 1286619 A. E. R. Pelham, RAFVR.
- 592005 L. A. Perkins.
- 1041863 G. W. Phillips, RAFVR.
- 1448155 J. G. Phimister, RAFVR.
- 987468 J. Picken, RAFVR.
- 872465 S. Pickering, AAF.
- 1125772 E. H. Pilkington, RAFVR.
- 1149242 S. J. Pitts, RAFVR.
- 1455894 E. S. Flatten, RAFVR.
- 934389 H. A. Pledger, RAFVR.
- 1407816 S. A. Pollard, RAFVR.
- 1311963 A. C. Poore, RAFVR.
- 1511662 G. R. Portus, RAFVR.
- 1272870 W. G. Pothecary, RAFVR.
- 1619296 P. Pratt, RAFVR.
- 1048598 A. Price, RAFVR.
- 1833002 R. J. Price, RAFVR.
- 1198486 W. H. Price, RAFVR.
- 1022109 J. H. S. Prime, RAFVR.
- 1738593 P. McC. Pullon, RAFVR.
- 622520 T. Quee.
- 163200 J. Read.
- 1050337 D. Reid, RAFVR.
- 973798 G. G. Reid, RAFVR.
- 1113355 J. J. Reid, RAFVR.
- 1835894 F. Reynolds, RAFVR.
- 1492648 E. Rhodes, RAFVR.
- 1694785 J. Rhodes, RAFVR.
- 1296610 R. P. Rice, RAFVR.
- 1182932 E. A. Richards, RAFVR.
- 1491781 C. H. Riches, RAFVR.
- 1402335 P. A. R. Ricketts, RAFVR.
- 1212727 V. H. Ridler, RAFVR.
- 991917 G. Ridley, RAFVR.
- 1458834 S. Room, RAFVR.
- 1563635 H. Roper, RAFVR.
- 1259283 D. Ross, RAFVR.
- 1266784 R. V. Rowles, RAFVR.
- 1017771 J. G. Rutter, RAFVR.
- 984949 J. A. Salkeld, RAFVR.
- 1492821 H. Salt, RAFVR.
- 1578824 F. Savage, RAFVR.
- 1666450 W. Scadding, RAFVR.
- 1525478 G. H. Selway, RAFVR.
- 1563875 G. Shankland, RAFVR.
- 1662866 N. F. Shatford, RAFVR.
- 1738609 L. H. Sheriston, RAFVR.
- 1061879 G. W. Sherlock, RAFVR.
- 1001776 A. Simpson, RAFVR.
- 3632435 R. Slater, RAFVR.
- 1637462 W. C. Slocombe, RAFVR.
- 1442752 C. S. Smith, RAFVR.
- 1656225 E. G. Smith, RAFVR.
- 1667204 H. S. Smith, RAFVR.
- 1413493 N. H. Smith, RAFVR.
- 1205716 W. H. Smith, RAFVR.
- 522425 W. J. S. Smith.
- 1332343 A. E. Spinks, RAFVR.
- 1643658 R. Spraggons, RAFVR.
- 1462091 A. W. J. Springham, RAFVR.
- 1090479 J. W. Standerline, RAFVR.
- 1298737 J. Stanley, RAFVR.
- 1516614 R. H. Stead, RAFVR.
- 972917 A. L. Stevenson, RAFVR.
- 1367779 D. M. W. Stewart, RAFVR.
- 1413498 K. C. Stone, RAFVR.
- 1510225 R. Stowell, RAFVR.
- 1296810 E. J. Strange, RAFVR.
- 1212196 J. L. Sullivan, RAFVR.
- 1134247 P. Sullivan, RAFVR.
- 1331110 R. Summerscales, RAFVR.
- 542116 J. F. Sunderland.
- 1696474 W. H. Sutcliffe, RAFVR.
- 1550240 G. Sutton, RAFVR.
- 1723628 J. G. Tadgell, RAFVR.
- 1422411 A. H. Taylor, RAFVR.
- 978326 C. B. Taylor, RAFVR.
- 1456448 R. G. Taylor, RAFVR.
- 1163940 R. L. Thomas, RAFVR.
- 1430930 N. Thomas, RAFVR.
- 1529334 C. E. Thompson, RAFVR.
- 1833208 K. E. C. Timbury, RAFVR.
- 1635058 H. W. Towers, RAFVR.
- 1873375 W. L. Trimm, RAFVR.
- 1213636 F. Trimmer, RAFVR.
- 1773083 C. Burner, RAFVR.
- 1015379 F. G. Turner, RAFVR.
- 01643747 N. E. Turner, RAFVR.
- 1873282 S. F. Turner, RAFVR.
- 1287725 J. R. Tuthill, RAFVR.
- 1130449 C. E. Upsall, RAFVR.
- 986441 A. Usher, RAFVR.
- 1637112 J. Usher, RAFVR.
- 1503597 C. Vernon, RAFVR.
- 1020437 J. Viggars, RAFVR.
- 1426958 R. T. Wagland, RAFVR.
- 1540179 W. T. Wait, RAFVR.
- 702246 F, T. Wakeman, RAFVR.
- 1169249 A. Walker, RAFVR.
- 1723688 D. E. Walker, RAFVR.
- 1659048 F. L. Walker, RAFVR.
- 1540535 H. Walker, RAFVR.
- 1157354 T. Walker, RAFVR.
- 1037064 R. A. Waterfield, RAFVR.
- 1118402 K. L. Waters, RAFVR.
- 1863473 L. G. Watkins, RAFVR.
- 1540771 M. Watkinson, RAFVR.
- 1019195 T. T. Watson, RAFVR.
- 1662103 A. E. G. Watts, RAFVR.
- 1455720 J. B. Waugh, RAFVR.
- 1655168 J. Way, RAFVR.
- 1022220 H. Waywell, RAFVR.
- 1679286 T. T. Webster, RAFVR.
- 1123719 S. J. Weir, RAFVR.
- 1861188 A. R. Welch, RAFVR.
- 1664011 M. J. Weldon, RAFVR.
- 917780 J. V. Weller, RAFVR.
- 1298922 E. T. Wellman, RAFVR.
- 1835526 A. J. Wesley, RAFVR.
- 1039615 L. Wharton, RAFVR.
- 1297373 H. G. Wheeler, RAFVR.
- 1226966 H. J. Wheeler, RAFVR.
- 1375346 G. Whines, RAFVR.
- 1460728 A. E. White, RAFVR.
- 1151046 C. White, RAFVR.
- 1537507 J. White, RAFVR.
- 1500974 T. B. White, RAFVR.
- 941431 A. Wilkes, RAFVR.
- 1122975 W. D. Williams, RAFVR.
- 1521928 D. E. Willis, RAFVR.
- 1656518 A. N. Wilson, RAFVR.
- 1345787 G. Wilson, RAFVR.
- 967157 J. Wilson, RAFVR.
- 1637443 C. E. Wimledon, RAFVR.
- 1680787 J. Wood, RAFVR.
- 2201661 F. Worne, RAFVR.
- 1004269 H. J. Young, RAFVR.
- 1715933 J. R. Young, RAFVR.

Aircraftmen 1st Class

- 2246412 B. J. Allum, RAFVR.
- 1799371 C. Augusta, RAFVR.
- 1830345 C. R. Barnett, RAFVR.
- 1635246 G. Bartlett, RAFVR.
- 1202579 G. A. Bowden, RAFVR.
- 1343103 J. C. Callander, RAFVR.
- 1552882 J. M. Clark, RAFVR.
- 1091962 J. W. Cooper, RAFVR.
- 1591677 A. B. Firth, RAFVR.
- 1638833 E. N. F. Grimshaw, RAFVR.
- 1820874 N. Halket, RAFVR.
- 1143291 F. Hemingsley, RAFVR.
- 1093288 E. W. C. Herbert, RAFVR.
- 1870669 H. Hirst, RAFVR.
- 1831192 A. S. Hull, RAFVR.
- 1501108 W. Johnson, RAFVR.
- 1497699 L. Lawson, RAFVR.
- 1882573 J. S. Mills, RAFVR.
- 1325608 D. D. Milton, RAFVR.
- 1828494 J. H. Gates, RAFVR.
- 927403 W. F. Palmer, RAFVR.
- 1611242 S. E. Prentice, RAFVR.
- 2205366 J. Rodgers, RAFVR.
- 1506096 H. V. Roe, RAFVR.
- 1660334 A. Snodin, RAFVR.
- 1877233 R. Tidmas, RAFVR.
- 578749 J. E. Walker.
- 842040 L. Weaver, AAF.
- 1533766 G. S. Winter, RAFVR.
- 921377 S. M. Withers, RAFVR.
- 1830420 L. J. Yendole, RAFVR.

Aircraftmen 2nd Class

- 1329908 L. C. G. Gale, RAFVR.
- 1291785 J. M. Griffin, RAFVR.
- 1419224 W. J. Harries, RAFVR.
- 1798981 J. W. O'Grady, RAFVR.
- 2246627 C. Taylor, RAFVR.

Princess Mary's Royal Air Force Nursing Service
Senior Sister

- P. Giles (5105).

Sisters

- M. I. Fraser (5496).
- K. M. Hood (5466).
- E. F. Judge (5284).
- C. McV. Maclean (5326).
- M. Mercer (6173).
- M. Olding (5839).
- B. Rigg (5966).
- J. S. Ross (5423).
- C. M. Thomas (5324).

Women's Auxiliary Air Force
Group Officer

- S. V. Williamson.(5).

Acting Group Officer

- I. C. Mansel (162).

Squadron Officers

- M. S. Graham (540).
- M. Goldie (692).
- M. Hofton (220).
- E. M. W. Parkhurst (1407).
- M. J. Shaw (268).
- M. S. Somerville (670).
- M. I. Taudevin (206).
- J. I. Whittome (568).

Acting Squadron Officer

- M. S. Philip (1277).

Flight Officers

- H. D. C. Bannerman (2975).
- B. D. Barham (496).
- A. R. D. Bartels (2309).
- D. H. Britain (1125).
- V. Burleigh (677).
- Lady L. M. M. Ashley-Cooper (2063).
- V. M. Fisher (2765).
- A. V. Hamilton-Grace (513).
- E. B. Kaleva (6602).
- J. H. Lawrence (6485).
- B. Meek (2679).
- M. Mowat (2110).
- D. Mustart (5329).
- C. Potter (2299).
- A. E. S. Rigg (3087).
- B. T. Robinson (2375).
- K. M. Spry (3527).
- B. M. Thomson (986).
- R. Townsend (2468).
- M. C. Watts (5047).
- S. Weilbaecher (2133).
- M. P. Wright (5350).

Acting Flight Officers

- D. M. P. Blackman (4061).
- M. E. F. Boyd (2609).
- R. M. Bray (3941).
- G. M. Budge (2535).
- E. I. M. Fordham (2585).
- N. Gabbitass (3231).
- E. B. Goodwin (4607).
- S. M. Grannell (6075).
- A. S. Henderson (6339).
- W. M. Muller (4232).
- D. M. Norton (3381).
- M. M. Phillips (6875).
- P. J. Rebbetts (6180).
- D. I. Rose (2921).
- S. M. Tomkinson (6191).
- C. M. Wallace (2905).
- B. Welsh (3653).
- K. M. Wild (3993).

Section Officers

- M. M. Bayly (3819).
- H. E. Benson (3685).
- M. B. Brittan (5633).
- E. M. C. Brown (4834).
- P. A. Bryan (3199).
- L. A. Burn (4764).
- D. Butland (3085).
- P. B. Carter (3983).
- E. H. E. Chaldecott (4237).
- K. P. Cleeve (1394).
- P. J. Copinger (2582).
- D. S. Crutchley (4419).
- D. G. Doudney (5124).
- D. J. Elliott (7106).
- A. E. Evans (6135).
- B. G. Edwards (3844).
- E. F. Fyfe (1521).
- F. E. Gladwell (6624).
- G. Glassey (4661).
- B. J. Griffiths (4941).
- M. E. Gunlack (4920).
- C. C. Harvey (7251).
- W. D. A. Haslett (6787).
- S. Hollis (2939).
- M. V. Kent (7932).
- A. M, M. Leach (3487).
- G. M. Lewis (4496).
- A. W. G. Miller (4665).
- C. H. Pither (4082).
- M. R. Robison (3388).
- H. M. Ronald (3695).
- S. A. Sadd (5334).
- E. D. Shoubridge (3176).
- M. Smith (7151).
- V. M. Sweetman (6846).
- B. Turner (3683).
- M. E. Vickers (7061).
- P. Williams (2872).
- H. T. Worrall (4669).

Acting Section Officer

- M. T. Byck (9911).

Warrant Officers

- J. Barker (421243).
- K. McCorquodale (420352).
- H. Russell (894579).

Flight Sergeants

- 892830 J. Acomb.
- 444683 D. C. Born.
- 881072 E. Grossman.
- 890690 E. Emeny.
- 888936 S. Freeland.
- 424322 H. J. Hill.
- 895650 G. Howe.
- 891434 G. Jack.
- 452558 M. T. Parkin.
- 886169 M. Robinson.
- 440377 F. M. Tomkins.

Acting Flight Sergeants

- 442853 A. Q. Marshall.
- 896482 C. D. Paul.

Sergeants

- 886359 E. E. R. Adams.
- 880566 M. L. Alexander.
- 441853 D. E. Allengame.
- 887345 F. N. Baler.
- 447633 M. E. Benson.
- 891546 S. Bishop.
- 435515 E. Bladen.
- 881945 M. Blaney.
- 2030712 H. K. Bloomfield.
- 890371 B. Brooks.
- 2004903 O. V. Dunkley.
- 424115 G. M. Frankland.
- 2022593 D. I. Gill.
- 421039 T. Howard.
- 19718 T. M. Jansen.
- 2051488 J. E. Jennings.
- 2023037 R. D. F. Jones.
- 451238 M. F. Legg.
- 451522 G. H. Lewis.
- 888020 Z. Lipson.
- 2097038 E. M. McMaster.
- 423768 G. N. Morley.
- 889775 M. Parsons.
- 431994 C. A. Penny.
- 2084899 D. M. Pharaoh.
- 423134 M. M. Poole.
- 2014335 V.M. Powell.
- 486139 M. A. Saggers.
- 2022634 D. J. W. Sanderson.
- 444262 M. E. Slaughter.
- 893789 E. Smalley.
- 440620 P. V. Smith.
- 2017763 K. N. Stage.
- 445645 G. N. Staley.
- 2001999 M. G. P. Stevenson.
- 2097821 E. Traynor.
- 2026703 G. Vaugham.
- 2054511 V. Watson.
- 431583 O. Yarrow.

Acting Sergeant

- 95775 M. M. Stevens.

Corporals

- 2029100 M. F. Baker.
- 425470 E. J. Baker.
- 975544 W. D. Baldwin.
- 2001462 A. G. Betts.
- 2004451 K. G. Bolton.
- 2048277 F. Bradley.
- 453263 H. B. Bryant.
- 430260 N. Charlton.
- 2006720 W. E. Cheshire.
- 2064211 M. I. Clarke.
- 2059624 C. E. Clement.
- 436503 C. M. Condon.
- 422536 F. D. Cook.
- 444018 A. F. Cooper.
- 2028809 A. B. Cooper.
- 453037 E. Dagg.
- 450394 M. Darlington.
- 2069016 A. M. Davies.
- 2021764 V. Dear.
- 2094273 A. Denham.
- 420881 J. K. Dodd.
- 455658 M. M. Dorwald.
- 477587 J. M. Dougall.
- 2016872 U. V. Eldridge.
- 427013 J. C. Evans.
- 305376 C. J. Fairhurst.
- 2091580 J. Flinn.
- 2005354 M. Foster.
- 434404 M. A. Foster.
- 443097 I. M. Fountain.
- 883052 N. J. Francis.
- 2084453 R. Freedman.
- 2007378 N. Goble.
- 2007809 N. Gooch.
- 894403 G. A. Harding.
- 2043261 M. P. Hennessey.
- 440409 J. M. Herd.
- 2038666 C. Hinton.
- 2002264 L. G. Hodgkinson.
- 443462 N. R. Holley.
- 2055135 P. M. Jackson.
- 2125796 N. E. Jackson.
- 2008505 J. E. Jewiss.
- 449951 I. McL. Kidd.
- 456344 J. E. King.
- 433840 C. S. Lamont.
- 464414 J. M. Large.
- 304333 W. L. Lindsay.
- 447339 I. M. Machin.
- 2078156 M. G. McClelland.
- 2134227 I. S. Marshall.
- 2069524 E. J. Meeham.
- 2082693 M. Miller.
- 2093113 M. E. Purvis.
- 445585 M. E. J. Puzey.
- 2027072 I. T. Ritchie.
- 2116337 E. G. Rivett.
- 2141210 A. M. Roberts.
- 893537 M. Robinson.
- 2064049 D. B. Salt.
- 2092530 A. Smith.
- 436704 H. F. G. Snow.
- 2046434 N. Stephen.
- 453310 P. D. Sorensen.
- 2043391 J. Stewart.
- 428638 F. Storey.
- 2080426 E. Stott.
- 420516 D. F. Sutton.
- 461015 P. A. Taylor.
- 432589 V. Thompson.
- 480171 I. D. D. Thomson.
- 2050854 B. Tindall.
- 2018178 S. M. Tointon.
- 448803 D. M. Tysoe.

Acting Corporals

- 2028551 B. Quihanton.
- 456838 J. M. Williamson.

Leading Aircraftwomen

- 2033053 E. D. Alder.
- 2028466 V. E. Allen.
- 2033463 J. T. Arnold.
- 2141061 H. F. Ascott.
- 457594 I. Auburn.
- 464629 M. A. Barclay.
- 2103207 J. Barker.
- 472994 J. I. Barnes.
- 488102 S. M. Barrs.
- 2057354 D. Bell.
- 2024031 J. M. Beresford.
- 2052542 G. W. Blake.
- 2140154 E. M. Bridge.
- 2135501 G. Burnell.
- 2027819 B. J. Burt.
- 443555 E. S. Burton.
- 2127342 B. M. Bushell.
- 486011 V. C. Campbell.
- 476278 S. V. D. Cannon.
- 473896 E. G. Carrington.
- 2093874 H. M. Cherry.
- 2138569 J. Cochrane.
- 2067707 Z. J. Collyer.
- 2013411 B. E. Davey.
- 2084479 H. M. Davies.
- 466419 I. J. Deane.
- 2048546 E. M. Dennison.
- 2052978 C. Deyes.
- 2098819 V. M. Dodd.
- 480033 J. Donnelly.
- 2106334 I. Ewins.
- 2062551 A. Farmer.
- 894338 P. Fawdon.
- 457296 J. L. Forbes.
- 2027590 L. K. Foster.
- 2135669 E. E. French.
- 2026817 W. F. C. Fulker.
- 477782 J. B. Goodchild.
- 2145100 H. H. D. Gordon.
- 2011498 V. M. Gray.
- 2149943 M. H. Green.
- 444821 W. G. Gurney.
- 2027895 E. B. Hale.
- 1134359 W. H. Hannet.
- 2064916 F. Hatfield.
- 444056 M. J. P. Hogg.
- 2017391 M. A. Holt.
- 477978 R. M. Hudson.
- 2028763 D. M. Hughes.
- 461291 E. W. Hughes.
- 488727 I. W. Hunt.
- 2029736 J. D. Hurst.
- 442623 J. Iannaccone.
- 2064380 L. M. Jay.
- 2096832 M. A. Jolliff.
- 2107769 B. Kendrick.
- 2130648 M. Kahn.
- 485399 J. M. T. Kirby.
- 464340 J. V. Kirk.
- 483178 M. J. Knight.
- 2038967 I. Lane.
- 2130001 A. L. Lewis.
- 4496 G. M. Lewis.
- 478387 W. Lindsay.
- 2135149 J. Little.
- 2069472 A. Long.
- 2091641 E. Lunn.
- 440921 M. McCalla.
- 2134466 E. E. McConnell.
- 466937 M. L. McDonald.
- 2029886 M. Z. MacKenzie.
- 461440 M. T. M. McKerrow.
- 461348 M. M. McLaren.
- 2025050 I. Marshall.
- 434742 M. M. Mawdsley.
- 2116988 A. Mc. Merret.
- 456595 J. P. L. Mitchell.
- 2021151 D. Mulholland.
- 2046939 C. C. Neill.
- 462229 M. Orritt.
- 455073 J. A. Payne.
- 2057312 J. M. Phelps.
- 467190 E. M. Poole.
- 490645 M. Potaczala.
- 2025830 K. A. Prestcott.
- 1481795 T. Proctor.
- 2131071 L. B. Purslow.
- 2146739 Z. Rheuben.
- 477421 M. F. Roberts.
- 457451 D. O. Ryan.
- 2990082 P. Schaum.
- 471094 M. P. Small.
- 2116646 E. C. Smith
- 467571 P. M. Southcombe.
- 2138392 O. Sowray.
- 2022729 N. Spence.
- 2050443 K. Stupples.
- 469565 M. C. Sullivan.
- 424712 J. A. C. Tavener.
- 2052210 M. Taylor.
- 435542 E. M. Tether.
- 2027818 E. E. Thompson.
- 2044429 F. V. Thon.
- 452965 E. Tumber.
- 473024 M. J. Tune.
- 472366 D. J. Wainwright.
- 2019974 A. M. E. Walker.
- 2098381 M. N. G. Westropp.
- 463774 B. White.
- 2130766 J. W. Williams.
- 2033748 L. W. J. Williams.
- 2098678 D. F. Willis.
- 2049953 B. D. Wilson.
- 2011082 I. H. Wix.
- 2138007 I. Woodhead.
- 470245 M. A. Worrell.
- 2086319 E. Wright.
- 460655 J. Wrigley.
- 2030890 J. Young.

Aircraftwomen 1st Class

- 468841 F. Heywood.
- 2138914 J. Patmore.
- 2145434 D. G. McKinstry.
- 2117807 M. J. H. Smelt.
- 458169 M. P. Whittaker.

=== Royal Australian Air Force ===
Acting Wing Commanders

- J. N. Davenport, DSO, DFC, GM, (Aus.403403).
- R. C. Mackay (Aus.402527).
- A. L. Wiggins, DSO, DFC, (Aus.407541).

Squadron Leaders

- L. F. Brennan (Aus.2339).
- T. Brown, DFC, (Aus.3933).
- E. E. Burgess (Aus.406420).
- P. A. Folley (Aus.253725).
- C. G. Greeves (Aus.262147).
- D. Scanlon (Aus.267221).
- W. Sprott (Aus.402887).

Acting Squadron Leaders

- R. B. Crampton (Aus.33335).
- A. G. G. Richmond, GM, (Aus.404037).

Flight Lieutenants

- F. D'O. Barnett (Aus.406088).
- J. L. Cummins (Aus.401368).
- J. S. Davidson (Aus.401775).
- W. G. Done (Aus.425619).
- W. V. Dunn (Aus.10780).
- A. J. Excell (Aus.284700).
- C. W. J. Fenwick (Aus.421035).
- R. J. Fogarty (Aus.410539).
- J. M. Francis (Aus.404810).
- J. H. Grant (Aus.41139).
- L. J. Hansen (Aus.412591).
- E. T. Heap (Aus.405053).
- W. K. Hodge (Aus.413119).
- W. H. Hodge (Aus.3601).
- R. C. W. Humble (Aus.416441).
- L. V. Joseph (Aus.254706).
- D. A. Kanard (Aus.420344).
- I. C. Kempe (Aus.283374).
- W. B. Keough. (Aus.420680).
- W. A. S. Killingworth (Aus.420960).
- J. M. Kirkman (Aus.406017).
- V. J. McCauley (Aus.403936).
- J. McCulloch (Aus.409429).
- D. B. McLennan (Aus.410416).
- P. I. McNaughton (Aus.409644).
- G. H. Middleton (Aus.422610).
- J. T. Minahan (Aus.421745).
- H. E. Mitchell (Aus.425333).
- F. J. Nugent (Aus.404256).
- J. H. Palmer (Aus.409585).
- J. F. Peter (Aus.413792).
- R. G. Pratt (Aus.266160).
- T. W. Riley (Aus.421393).
- J. A. C. Rodgers (Aus.425056).
- G. E. Rowe (Aus.420777).
- K. J. Shanahan (Aus.414732).
- S. D. P. Smith (Aus.414280).
- G. J. Stansfield (Aus.401543).
- J. C. Taylor (Aus.263398).
- H. Turner (Aus.410757).
- W. J. R. Vincent (Aus.409350).
- C. G. Williamson (Aus.417437).
- A. C. Winston (Aus.402605).
- G. C. Young (Aus.414860).

Acting Flight Lieutenants

- D. I. Conacher (Aus.420734).
- M. C. Dray (Aus.16887).
- J. L. Gibby (Aus.419935).
- B. T. McC. Jones (Aus.400090).
- A. D. McDonald (Aus.18121).
- J. B. Muntz (Aus.429666).

Flying Officers

- C. G. Ball (Aus.425582).
- G. C. Bassett (Aus.423590).
- W. A. Belson (Aus.426293).
- D. R. Bertram (Aus.419402).
- C. J. Bickford (Aus.415607).
- C. E. Bone (Aus.413949).
- L. I. P. Cox (Aus.419596).
- C. O. Davis (Aus.427305).
- L. G. Godley (Aus.427316).
- W. G. Hall (Aus.6120).
- J. E. Harmer (Aus.420748).
- E. C. Hickey (Aus.409407).
- R. E. Isaacson (Aus.417378).
- E. W. T. Jones (Aus.410897).
- D. H. Kingsbury (Aus.422959).
- R. C. Lamshed (Aus.417383).
- F. A. Lang (Aus.409927).
- F. J. Marsh (Aus.411590).
- W. L. Marshall (Aus.410671).
- N. G. Minchington (Aus.410612).
- T. I. Paltridge (Aus.429991).
- H. A. Patton (Aus.414262).
- N. D. Prime (Aus.26629).
- W. J. Quoucey (Aus.428658).
- J. F. Rayner (Aus.434545).
- D. R. Rutter (Aus.427949).
- K. G. Scarrott (Aus.409601).
- W. B. Searle (Aus.432285).
- B. R. Smith (Aus.415831).
- W. R. Speedie (Aus.408531).
- R. V. Stephens (Aus.420631).
- N. C. Sutherland (Aus.417429).
- C. G. Thomas (Aus.426849).
- T. J. Trood (Aus.418484).
- L. E. Walker (Aus.426800).
- W. W. G. Waterton (Aus.428837).
- F. C. West (Aus.426786).
- V. Willis (Aus.425395).

Pilot Officers

- L. R. Lambert (Aus.421286).
- W. R. Wade (Aus.431595).

Warrant Officers

- A. D. Brown (Aus.41726).
- N. R. Chaffey (Aus.421711).
- W. B. Granger (Aus.3510).
- E. L. Green (Aus.432153).
- I. R. Harvey (Aus.410548).
- J. W. Kent (Aus.403030).
- C. H. F. McClosker (Aus.422032).
- A. E. Sherriff (Aus.417669).
- P. A. Tod (Aus.417532).

Flight Sergeants

- Aus.5524 P. Derrick.
- Aus.300375 T. A. Gaston.
- Aus.26113 R. H. E. Hill.
- Aus.413608 A. W. Kempnich.
- Aus.6944 L. M. Sutherland.
- Aus.6965 S. W. Woodroffe.

Sergeants

- Aus.15152 L. Bale.
- Aus.16266 R. B. Korn.
- Aus.26973 R. W. Pappin.
- Aus.24126 C. G. Quail.
- Aus.18708 H. H. South.
- Aus.11252 C. H. J. Vedmore.

Leading Aircraftmen

- Aus.423337 J. P. Shaw.
- Aus.43731 J. G. J. Stevens.

=== Royal Canadian Air Force ===
Air Vice-Marshal

- C. R. Slemon, CBE

Air Commodore

- J. G. Kerr, AFC.

Group Captains

- R. J. Lane, DSO, DFC.
- G. R. McGregor.
- D. W. Stoneham.
- J. A. Verner.

Acting Group Captains

- A. C. Hull.
- J. L. H. Lecomte.

Wing Commanders

- E. M. Bryson, DFC, (Can/J.5116).
- D. D. Carr-Harris T (Can/2356).
- J. F. Clarke, DFC, (Can/J.15167).
- N. B. Eaton (Can/C.1850).
- C. B. Guest (Can/C.2537).
- G. A. Hiltz (Can/C.805).
- L. Lowenstein (Can/C.5620).
- J. G. Stephenson, AFC, (Can/C.860).

Acting Wing Commanders

- O. W. Durdin (Can/C.3622).
- J. F. Edwards (Can/J.16077).
- C. E. Harris, DFC, (Can/C.89525).
- E. P. Heybroek (Can/J.7318).
- H. Lamb (Can/C.2238).
- A. D. R. Lowe, DFC, (Can/J.1477).
- J. M. McLennan (Can/C.1973).
- K. C. Wilson (Can/C.1217).

Squadron Leaders

- W. E. R. Boone (Can/C.9830).
- N. M. Boyd (Can/C.15550).
- J. Brittan (Can/J.15229).
- H. J. A. Brown (Can/C.8050).
- J. D. Browne (Can/J.9068).
- W. C. Durham (Can/C.9109).
- J. C. C. Foley (Can/J.19524).
- J. A. Gordon (Can/C.1782).
- C. Harris (Can/C.3049).
- R. J. Hickey (Can/C.3898).
- H. T. Holden (Can/C.7736).
- D. A. Inman (Can/J.16149).
- I. E. Mactavish (Can/J.4419).
- C. N. McVeigh (Can/C.89501).
- F. A. Montgomery (Can/C.1398)
- G. R. Munro (Can/C.3374).
- D. N. S. Robertson (Can/C.5011).
- H. A. Sampson (Can/C.9036).
- N. Thorp (Can/J.9525).
- S. R. Wyman (Can/J.8330).

Acting Squadron Leaders

- J. C. Bonner (Can/C.7177).
- P. Buker (Can/C.9803).
- P. F. C. Byars (Can/C.10030).
- R. S. Croome (Can/J.8645).
- R. M. G. Currie (Can/J.15468).
- H. J. Esch (Can/J.7074).
- S. V. Grisdale (Can/C.5284).
- T. V. Johnson (Can/C.6927).
- D. C. Mclean (Can/J.6286).
- R. F. Maggs (Can/C.89548).
- P. G. F. Money (Can/C.9837).
- J. C. R. Robertson (Can/C.15559).
- W. H. Stauffer (Can/C.9974).
- G. L. Vogan (Can/J.17351).

Flight Lieutenants

- J. F. Anderson (Can/C.11923).
- A. E. Andrews (Can/J.25099).
- R. N. Bassarab (Can/J.22239).
- P. M. Benjamin (Can/J.20637).
- A. M. Berrey (Can/J.23053).
- R. T. Blatchford (Can/J.7644).
- W. E. Bouton (Can/J.22711).
- E. S. Braddell (Can/C.10837).
- P. A. Briscoe (Can/J.11628).
- N. F. Brookes (Can/C.11395).
- W. W. L. Brown (Can/J.16571) (since deceased).
- R. H.-Burden (Can/J.70115).
- E. F. Caborn (Can/C.21342).
- L. A. Carstairs (Can/C.17361).
- P. Castellan (Can/C.20719).
- W. S. K. Chant (Can/C.7145).
- J. Chapman (Can/C.18980).
- J. T. Clegg (Can/J.25945).
- H. D. Cougler (Can/C.13159).
- L. T. Cox (Can/C.24847).
- N. I. Cryderman (Can/C.8119).
- J. M. Daniels (Can/J.20462).
- F. R. Darling (Can/J.21752).
- H. D. Davy (Can/C.17815).
- P. S. Deacon (Can/J.25363).
- P. Dwornik (Can/J.22735).
- C. E. Edinger (Can/J.10272).
- W, J. Elliott (Can/J.25834).
- J. F. Evans (Can/J.6655).
- P. P. Ficek (Can/J.28386).
- A. E. Fleming (Can/J.16332).
- R. L. Fullerton (Can/J.21844).
- J. W. Fullerton (Can/.J.18717).
- J. A. Galbraith (Can/C.18978).
- B. E. Gallagher (Can/J.24213).
- W. D. J. Gibson (Can/J.21206).
- C. S. Gilliatt (Can/J.10269).
- W. G. H. Grant (Can/J.25311).
- J. J. Greene (Can/J.22689).
- H. Hagen (Can/C.18922).
- D. P. Hall (Can/J.5826).
- M. H. Hammond (Can/C.13301).
- W. S. Harvey (Can/J.12062).
- M. Hawrylack (Can/J.36383).
- L. C. Hempsall (Can/J.14638).
- D. H. Heriot (Can/C.8090).
- J. M. Hilton (Can/J.2232).
- D. Horner (Can/J.20258).
- L. E. Hunt (Can/J.15831).
- G. R. M. Hunt (Can/C.1471).
- A. J. Ireland (Can/J.11182).
- H. M. James (Can/J.25568).
- J. H. Jewitt (Can/J.14310).
- C. Jonason (Can/C.8016).
- W G. Klassen (Can/C.9890).
- J. Knott (Can/C.14893).
- I. H. Langdon (Can/J.23902).
- R. W. St. Lawrence (Can/C.17424).
- C. J. Lewis (Can/J.8335).
- M. F. Lewis (Can/J.24059).
- W. R. Lidkea (Can/C.7357).
- D. S. McCiaig (Can/C.29456).
- H. W. McDonald (Can/J.25007).
- J. B. MacDonald (Can/J.24124).
- I. W. McGregor (Can/C.23560).
- A. M. MacIntosh (Can/J.24916).
- W. A. McKay (Can/C.23507).
- M. Mckellar (Can/J.20844).
- D. J. McKitrick (Can/J.21390).
- A. G. McNab (Can/C.11678).
- D. A. McPherson (Can/C.25650)
- B. F. J. MacRory (Can/C.7256).
- D, G. Madill (Can/C.15881).
- W. M. Madill (Can/J.21812).
- F. A. Malone (Can/C.2675).
- E. R. Miles (Can/C.9064).
- R. Miller (Can/J.9491).
- A. R. Milne (Can/J.13337)
- J. M. Milson (Can/J.11571).
- W. Mowat (Can/J.22242).
- E. A. Nasmith (Can./J.20713).
- H. E. Nicholls (Can/C.11933).
- B. T. O'Beirn (Can/C.20520).
- H. E. Odlum (Can/J.28081).
- R. L. Paterson (Can/J.6810).
- D. M. Peden, DFC, (Can/J.20216).
- M. A. Perkins (Can/J.17292).
- C. R. Redeker (Can/J.12484).
- W. H. Reed (Can/J.10655).
- A. J. Reeve (Can/J.11484).
- J. E. Riddell (Can/C.2557).
- A. H. Rose (Can/J.15757).
- I. H. F. Rowley (Can/C.17686).
- T. A. Salo (Can/J.11033).
- C. R. H. Salt (Can/J.22375).
- S. G. Scott (Can/C.11926).
- H. D. Sinclair (Can/C.8117).
- K. S. Sleep (Can/J.9483).
- D. W. Southerst (Can/J.20045).
- F. R. Spafford (Can/J.23446).
- H. K. Y. Spencer (Can/C.11690).
- G. A. Stapleton (Can/J.12731).
- J. M. Stevenson (Can/C.27788).
- G. A. Stratton (Can/J.25338).
- R. H. Strouts (Can/J.17254).
- G. T. Sutherland (Can/C.3180).
- W. A. Switzer (Can/J.21618).
- R. M. Trites (Can/J.7919).
- R. K. Trumley (Can/J.14308).
- G. C. Turner (Can/C.10033).
- C. Waldrop (Can/J.11581).
- G. M. Weaver (Can/J.21405).
- H. H. Whipp (Can/C.13877).
- A. W. Winch (Can/J.27379).
- H. H. Woodhead (Can/C.15868).
- E. W. Yeo (Can/J.13365).
- M. E. Zimmer (Can/J.25030).

Acting Flight Lieutenants

- R. H. Offerhaus (Can/C.19548).
- G. B. Warman (Can/J.18540).

Flying Officers

- O. A. Allen (Can/C.38570).
- J. A. Angus (Can/J.87164).
- H. W. Barr (Can/J.90644).
- R. J. G. Beck (Can/J.89481).
- E. Bleich (Can/J.87491).
- T. R. Blythe (Can/C.18093).
- D. E. Denton (Can/J.35721).
- E. F. Dunn (Can/J.29661).
- L. M. C. Dunn (Can/C.27593).
- J, F. Farrell (Can/J.44106).
- L. E. Fitchett (Can/J.93441).
- A. W. Goldstone (Can/J.26425).
- J. A. Gordon (Can/J.92360).
- D. B. Graeme (Can/C.89555).
- A. M. Grant (Can/J.29853).
- I. Hamilton (Can/J.27546).
- P. J. Handkamer (Can/J.36228).
- A. A. Holliday (Can/J.85242).
- J. S. Kaminski (Can/J.38187).
- E. D. Kelly (Can/J.18567).
- C. G. Kennard (Can/J.36175).
- O. H. Levere. (Can/J.36187).
- J. J. McDowell (Can/J.26690).
- H. W. McLeod (Can/J.85327).
- R. W. McManaman (Can/J.26840).
- E. A. Mabee (Can/J.88781).
- S. A. Marshall (Can/J.28750).
- J. C. Martin (Can/J.86938).
- M. H. Michael (Can/J.90873).
- H. E. Miskiman (Can/J.19625).
- G. R. Nowell (Can/J.26775).
- R. A. Pegues (Can/J.19446).
- R. H. Pope (Can/C.17852).
- G. C. Rafter (Can/J.29110).
- L. C. Saunders (Can/J.39816).
- E. A. W. Skee (Can/C.89644).
- L. L. Smathers (Can/J.87764).
- L. E. Spurr (Can/J.91114).
- J. H. Thompson (Can/J.85572).
- C. L. Vaessen (Can/J.28073).
- W. H. Waddell (Can/J.92119).
- G. A. Welch (Can/J.28165).
- J. G. Wheeler (Can/J.38356).

Pilot Officers

- H. Brooks (Can/J.94368).
- R. F. Langdale (Can/J.94884).
- V. J. Langley (Can/J.93673).

Warrant Officers 1st Class

- I. S. Armstrong (Can/R.114144).
- H. L. Cook (Can/R.131002).
- J. H. Coombs (Can/R.63534).
- R. U. Day (Can/R.50404).
- A. C. Goucher (Can/R.59511).
- H. G. Goudie (Can/2630).
- E. A. Grant (Can/R.54561).
- D. C. Gray (Can/R.63608).
- J. E. Joyal (Can/R.51350).
- J. L. LaChance (Can9943).
- A. E. Lawson. (Can/R.164656).
- T. F. A. Longthorne (Can/R.63581).
- W. McCullogh (Can/R.51738).
- J. Maskell (Can626).
- D. K. Nolan (Can/R.82650).
- P. R. T. Perron (Can8115A).
- R. E. Perry (Can6610).
- L. E. A. Pocock (Can/R.157997).
- F. M. Smith (Can/R.118039).
- C. P. Surles (Can/R.145092).
- R. R. Whitehorne (Can/R.53521).
- A. Zacharuk (Can/R.159288).

Warrant Officers 2nd Class

- L. A. Pedley (Can/R.53505).
- A. P. Weir (Can/144A).

Acting Warrant Officers

- H. J. Bunker (Can/R.225585).
- J. H. Jarrott (Can/R.165492).

Flight Sergeants

- Can/R.12140A H. L. Amell.
- Can/R.53647 D. S. Bender.
- Can/R.2314 C. L. Bourgeois.
- Can/R.53501 L. Bradley.
- Can/R.51041 E. E. Eddy.
- Can/R.50323 E. G. Gay.
- Can/R.69014 W. J. Gray.
- Can/R.76080 H. L. Harper.
- Can/R.52230 R. J. Irwin.
- Can/R.60703 R. G. Lyster.
- Can/R.64669 J. B. MacIntyre.
- Can/R.83647 W. K. Morton.
- Can/R.86407 E. C. Norton.
- Can/R.52208 J. E. Parkinson.
- Can/R.64063 G. E. Pidduck.
- Can/R.75514 J. F. W. Prudence.
- Can/R.90644 J. R. A. Ricard.
- Can/7560 H. J. Scott.
- Can/R.52416 H. Serabian.
- Can/R.6052A R. Skelding.
- Can/R.54510 H. H. Skene
- Can/R.54924 E. B. P. Stone.
- Can/R.57685 E. C. Trew.
- Can/R.63711 Tripp.
- Can/R.100899 G. Walters.
- Can/R.145005 D. W. Watson.
- Can/R.50565 J. A. Young.

Acting Flight Sergeants

- Can/R.94310 L. M. Daniel.
- Can/R.62694 J. H. Roy.

Sergeants

- Can/R.59802 W. E. Allen.
- Can/R.78308 E. J. Ballinger.
- Can/R.100638 A. H. Barnett.
- Can/R.144636 L. J. E. Belanger.
- Can/R.83740 G. K. Booth.
- Can/R.67151 R. Brushette.
- Can/R.53635 I. W. Buck.
- Can/R.103063 W. F. J. Burstow.
- Can/R.200321 C. Christoff.
- Can/R.168056 W. H. Cook.
- Can/R.100784 H. L. Davies.
- Can/R.75442 T. M. Dickson.
- Can/R.176475 J. D. Duchak.
- Can/R.63692 R. V. Finch.
- Can/R.95944 L. E. Goddard.
- Can/R.80917 N. R. Guild.
- Can/R.250069 W. A. Hammond.
- Can/R.111237 J. G. Hudson.
- Can/R.141881 C. M. Hume.
- Can/R.72886 J. T. Hunter.
- Can/R.138876 C. A. Hurley.
- Can/R.79879 J. A. Irwin.
- Can/R.85710 G. E. Kendall.
- Can/R.63818 D. L. L. Larcen.
- Can/R.99617 J. A. Lewis.
- Can/R.59505 H. J. McFarlane.
- Can/R.97264 E. S. Martin.
- Can/R.209235 L. M. Mehr.
- Can/R.9004 E. R. Miles.
- Can/R.84164 H. A. Miller.
- Can/R.134918 R. H. Millroy.
- Can/R.94779 P. A. Nash.
- Can/R.60520 G. R. Nicholls.
- Can/R.102563 E. J. Parker.
- Can/R.101133 A. N. R. Peacock.
- Can/R.62658 C. O. Raymond.
- Can/R.157637 P. A. Reeve.
- Can/R.82898 W. H. Russell.
- Can/R.77623 P. R. H. Schlatter.
- Can/R.73553 M. J. Seeley.
- Can/R.149025 B. C. Shepherd.
- Can/R.67783 D. Tingle.
- Can/R.96284 C. W. Warner.
- Can/R.63774 R. C. Warren.
- Can/R.117008 C. K. Wolff.

Acting Sergeants

- Can/R.56917 H. G. Branigan.
- Can/R.107296 E. O. Labrosse.
- Can/R.73670 H. T Wittes.
- Can/R.98040 T. M. Howard.
- Can/R.50431 D. W. Schmidl.

Corporals

- Can/R.73678 J. H. C. Adams.
- Can/R.152313 L. J. Berbrick.
- Can/R.85274 G. W. Billyard.
- Can/R.114455 J. R. Birk.
- Can/R.139106 E. A. Corke.
- Can/R.87950 N. J. Craib.
- Can/R.130841 C. Eastabrook.
- Can/R.153949 P. Eustace.
- Can/R.109590 W. S. Ferguson.
- Can/R.57629 R. J. Fraser.
- Can/R.65019 R. E. Hancock.
- Can/R.100637 E. C. Harvey.
- Can/R.128722 D. A. Hopgood.
- Can/R.59205 L. R. Howlett.
- Can/R.117418 N. J. Hughes.
- Can/R.59498 A. H. Johnson.
- Can/R.136074 I. Kleiman.
- Can/R.155454 T. E. Lee.
- Can/R.71101 E. F. Liggins.
- Can/R.79581 N. A. McLafferty.
- Can/R.225524 G. C. Mann.
- Can/R.197821 T. C. Mark.
- Can/R.109254 J. H. Molyneux.
- Can/R.161323 D. G. Moore.
- Can/R.108576 M. Newport.
- Can/R.162616 H. Parfitt.
- Can/R.103475 J. Pezanowsky.
- Can/R.111467 J. G. R. St. Pierre.
- Can/R.75231 N. E. Shultis.
- Can/R.121861 W. A. Reid.
- Can/R.129825 E. A. Skinner.
- Can/R.170428 W. A. Spicer.
- Can/R.63943 R. G. White.
- Can/R.214813 W. W. Wiacek.
- Can/R.90521 G. P. Wilson.
- Can/R.90832 W. Whyte.
- Can/R.61533 H. D. Wilks.

Acting Corporal

- Can/R.153409 K. E. Cooke.

Leading Aircraftmen

- Can/R.122124 H. H. Aris.
- Can/R.109132 R. M. Divel.
- Can/R.160340 E. Ecclestone.
- Can/R.164232 J. D. Ferguson.
- Can/R.139918 A. R. Goodwin.
- Can/R.141880 J. A. F. R. Guerin.
- Can/R.191617 I. S. Kelly.
- Can/R.168305 D. Lajeuneese.
- Can/R.114194 J. P. E. Lefler.
- Can/R.259156 H. S. Morrison.
- Can/R.116164 I. Noble.
- Can/R.116770 E. J. Pile.
- Can/R.130326 E. Rosene.
- Can/R.122822 W. J. N. Throop.
- Can/R.191806 D. Wainwright.

Royal Canadian Air Force (Women's Division)
Flight Officers

- B. I. Fellows (V.30083).
- E. U. Gear (V.30382).
- R. J. McJannett (V.30170).
- M. I. Morton (V.30407)
- I. A. Ross (V.30188).
- M. F. Satterly (V.30086).
- M. G. Taunton (V.30280).
- N. M. Taunton (V.30094).

Section Officer

- H. F. Macintosh (V.30474).

Sergeant

- W.309986 M. P. Seccombe.

Corporals

- W.304720 F. H. M. Paling.
- W.302541 A. A. R. Reid.

Leading Aircraftwomen

- W.315189 E. G. Anderson.
- W.317603 D. M. Thompson.

=== Royal Indian Air Force ===
Squadron Leader

- R. A. Rajaram (Ind/1573).

Flying Officer

- F. B. Amber (Ind/1659).

Pilot Officer

- M. Mahboob (Ind/2762).

Warrant Officer

- Ali Barkat (Ind/47).

Flight Sergeant.

- Ind/103 Moh'd Siddiq.

Sergeants

- Ind/10805 G. S. Dewedi.
- Ind/10339 Hashmirashingh.
- Ind/10265 A. P. Nazareth.
- Ind/10783 C. Subramanian.

Corporals

- Ind/10787 M. M. Dutta.
- Ind/10036 G. K. John.
- Ind/10456 C. M. Kaka.
- Ind/10895 T. Mathews.
- Ind/10899 C. V. Rao.
- Ind/10359 G. Singh.

Leading Aircraftman

- Ind/27022 A. B. Raj.

=== Royal New Zealand Air Force ===
Acting Wing Commander

- T. F. Gill (N.Z.2308).

Acting Squadron Leaders

- F. C. Connolly (N.Z.405236).
- J. R. Gardner (N.Z.2177).
- W. R. Gellatly (N.Z.40563).
- B. R. Quinlan (N.Z.404408).
- R. E. Stout (N.Z.2371).
- R. G. Watts (N.Z.404974).

Flight Lieutenants

- J. S. Asher (N.Z.422169).
- S. I. Baird (N.Z.39897)
- W. P. Bell, DFC, (N.Z.421006).
- E. T. Bennett (N.Z.411359).
- W. R. Cook (N.Z.411375).
- F. W. Davison (N.Z.41885).
- W. M. Dowle (N.Z.41619).
- C. N. Gall (N.Z.411492).
- C. M. Gibbs (N.Z.412678).
- W. C. Henderson (N.Z.415435).
- N. R. G. Jeffs (N.Z.41392).
- F. W. Kilgour (N.Z.412701).
- M. C. Maiston (N.Z.422304).
- P. F. Prescott (N.Z.424516).
- J. W. Reid (N.Z.2073).
- C. G. Rouse (N.Z.426338).
- R. C. Sayers (N. Z.41943).
- A. R. H. Stevenson (N.Z.41500).
- P. W. D. Stewart (N.Z.404962).
- M. C. Thorburn (N.Z.413512).
- S. E. Wilks (N.Z.415429).
- M. A. Collett (N.Z.422260).

Flying Officers

- B. M. Leonard (N.Z.427998).
- J. W. Marshall (N.Z.42784).
- J. E. Patterson (N.Z.414890).
- G. S. Patrick (N.Z.4150101).
- E. B. Reynolds (N.Z.422209).
- I. C. Skudder (N.Z.427234).
- L. B. Taylor (N.Z.4213805).
- F. H. Tipping (N.Z.4213305).

Pilot Officers

- J. W. Mckenzie (N.Z.412077).
- R. A. Melles (N.Z.422538).

Warrant Officers

- C. A. Boyer (N.Z.39875).
- H. C. Hooper (N.Z.416319).
- J. S. Horan (N.Z 40608).
- A. R. C. Jackson (N.Z.411902).
- R. Keogh (N.Z.416120).
- G. D. McDonald (N.Z.427071).
- P. M. McQuarrie (N.Z.415822).

Flight Sergeant

- N.Z.416996 D. Aubrey,

Acting Flight Sergeant

- N.Z.40544 A. W. Martin.

Sergeant

- N.Z.413617 J. C. Sampson.

=== South African Air Force ===
Colonel

- J. Lorentz (102755V).

Lieutenant-Colonels

- S. L. Bosch (P.102600V).
- E. M. Lewis (103088V).
- G. N. Robertson (P.102607V).
- H. Starfield (103020V).
- D. P. Tilley, DSO, DFC, (102179V).

Majors

- J. D. Campbell (103411V).
- T. D. H. Catchpole (47526V).
- E. Baden-Cross (203363V).
- G. Dashwood-Fowler (106048V).
- L. W. Frewen (241014V).
- K. T. Frylinch (103512V).
- J. F. Giemre (203054V).
- J. C. Hunt (202983V).
- E. V. D. S. King (15461V).
- A. Plant (141458V).
- S. Robin (203210V).
- L. D. Sheedy (P.418V).
- D. R. Wood (47588V).
- E. G. W. Wright (98815V).
- S. W. Young (53731V).

Captains

- D. A. Abercrombie (542763V).
- L. D. Alderton (94713V).
- R. M. Anderson (100104V).
- C. K. B. Benfield (47797V).
- A. Brown (312393V).
- J. A. Brunnette (11049V).
- J. 7. Cadle (102372V).
- I. H. Campbell (206192V).
- B. Rose-Christie (205986V).
- E. J. Combes (10824V).
- K. R. Grossman (102307V).
- T. Evans (163879).
- B. Forster (245993V).
- I. Gering (125271V).
- G. Gordon (125442V).
- P. A. Hatswell (103267V).
- H. F. Hayman (103009V).
- M. C, Hopkins (89615V).
- D. M. Hosford (47254V).
- L. B. E. Hulett (206444V).
- A. G. Johns (106589V).
- W. C. Kelly (96563V).
- H. C. Knight (P.635V).
- G. T. Loser (135532V).
- C. F. Marais (96126V).
- A. C. Murman (105801V).
- T. W. S. Nagel (P.6276V).
- P. E. Nathan (99613V).
- J. F. Nel (98959V).
- L. J. Salmonsen (236489V).
- E. E. Schmidt (29369V).
- C. Segal (179754V).
- C. W. Shearar (P.290V).
- A. W. Short (P.605V).
- C. R. Sinclair (20551V).
- V. S. B. Tyte (82072V).
- J. H. Wessels (312352V).

Lieutenants

- W. H. Bailie (104039V).
- J. E. Begbie (79229V).
- J. H. E. Breytenbach (47966V).
- J. Colraine (94573V).
- G. W. Gumming (269894V).
- N. I. Decharmoy (326256V).
- P. Finberg (206915V).
- A. R. L. Freer (1361V).
- D. R. Inglis (97231V).
- K. B. MacDonald (328315V).
- H. Nankin (142255V).
- S. G. W. Roberts (102326V).
- H. A. Stocks (328943V).
- A. K. Taylor (328249V).
- D. de V. Van Der Merwe.
- D. T. Van Rooyen (205472V).
- K. Walker (20722V).

Warrant Officers

- R. J. Berry (P.597V).
- G. R. Cousins (5076V).

Warrant Officer II

- D. S. Houston-Mcmillan (98533V).

Flight Sergeants

- P.5615V J J. Ackerman.
- 95458V D. R. Blanckenberg.
- 99552V A. A. Carneson.
- P.5393V N F. Furrows.
- 98119V H. A. Rauff.
- 19426V A. B. Steele.
- P.4842V S. W. Vorster.
- P.1967 D. L. V. B. Wahl.
- 14993V J. T. M. Wilson.

Sergeants

- 57938V H. Galber.
- 116175V C. W. Kempson.
- M.7468V S. Nika.
- 224774V I. C. Swart.
- 237728V J. H. J. Visser.

Acting Sergeants

- 3628V F. V. Buchman.
- 543712V W. D. Decker.
- P.5183V J. Harmse.
- 236124V J. B. Lowe.
- 9978V A. B. Stone.
- 579000V E. W. Theron.

Corporals

- C.302933V D. H. Daniels.
- 176233V N. J. Erasmus.
- 115135V I. D. Lotter.

Acting Corporals

- 572656 K. R. Falgate.
- 100754V L. J. Koen.
- 579472V J. M. McEwan.

Air Mechanics

- 208391V H. J. Bloem.
- 572324V T. D. de V. Draycott.
- 327459V I. P. Du Preez.
- 572134 H. J. Hanlon.
- 280177V P. B. Sandiford.
- 99048V L. G. Seale.
- 31290V E. Watson.

Private

- N.75473V V. Ndhalavane.

South African Air Force (Women's Division).
Lieutenant

- 262817 J. E. Campbell.

Civilian

- E. G. Roose.
