= 2013 Birthday Honours =

British government recognitions

The 2013 Birthday Honours were appointments by some of the 16 Commonwealth realms of Queen Elizabeth II to various orders and honours to reward and highlight good works by citizens of those countries. The Birthday Honours are awarded as part of the Queen's Official Birthday celebrations during the month of June. The Queen's Birthday Honours were announced on 15 June 2013 in the United Kingdom, on 10 June 2013 in Australia, on 3 June 2013 in New Zealand, and on 15 June 2013 in Grenada, Papua New Guinea, Solomon Islands, Tuvalu, Saint Lucia and Belize.

The recipients of honours are displayed as they were styled before their new honour and arranged by the country (in order of precedence) whose ministers advised The Queen on the appointments, then by honour with grades i.e. Knight/Dame Grand Cross, Knight/Dame Commander etc. and then divisions i.e. Civil, Diplomatic and Military as appropriate.

== United Kingdom ==
The 2013 Queen's Birthday Honours list was published on 15 June 2013 by The London Gazette.

=== Member of the Order of the Companions of Honour (CH) ===
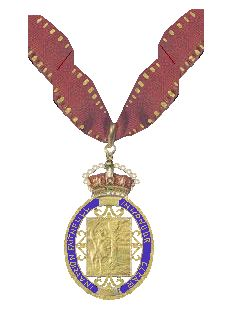
The riband and badge of a Member of the Order of the Companions of Honour

- The Right Honourable Sir Menzies Campbell CBE QC MP – For public and political service.
- Sir Nicholas Serota – Director, Tate. For services to Art.

=== Knight Bachelor ===
- Brendan Barber – Lately General Secretary, Trades Union Congress. For services to Employment Relations.
- Nigel Bogle – Co-Founder and Group Chairman, Bartle Bogle Hegarty. For services to the Advertising Industry.
- David Anthony Carter – Executive Principal, Cabot Learning Federation. For services to Education
- Andrew William Dilnot CBE – Chairman, UK Statistics Authority and Warden, Nuffield College, Oxford. For services to Economics and Economic Policy.
- Kenneth Archibald Gibson – Executive Headteacher, Harton Technology College and Jarrow School, South Tyneside, and Academy 360, Sunderland
- Professor Malcolm John Grant CBE – President and Provost, University College London. For services to Higher Education.
- Dr. Andrew James Hall – Chair, Joint Committee on Vaccination and Immunisation. For services to Public Health.
- John Robert Hills CBE – Professor of Social Policy, London School of Economics. For services to Social Policy Development.
- Michael Hintze AM – Philanthropist. For services to the Arts
- Stephen Geoffrey Houghton CBE – Leader, Barnsley Metropolitan Borough Council. For parliamentary and political services.
- Stephen House QPM – Chief Constable, Police Service of Scotland. For services to Law and Order.
- Anish Mikhail Kapoor CBE – Sculptor. For services to Visual Arts.
- Professor Peng Tee Khaw – Consultant Ophthalmic Surgeon and Professor, Moorfields Eye Hospital and UCL, London. For services to Ophthalmology.
- Edward Julian Egerton Leigh MP – Member of Parliament for Gainsborough and lately Chair, Public Accounts Committee. For public and political service.
- Gregory Michael Gerard Martin – Executive Head, Durand Academy, London Borough of Lambeth. For services to Education.
- Professor David Harry Metcalf CBE – Chair, Migration Advisory Committee, London. For services to UK Migration Policy.
- Jonathan Edward Harland (John) Mills AO FRSE – Director and Chief Executive, Edinburgh International Festival. For services to Culture.
- Richard Lake Olver – Chairman, BAE Systems. For services to Business.
- Professor Stephen Patrick O'Rahilly FRS – Professor of Clinical Biochemistry and Medicine, University of Cambridge, for services to medical research.
- Howard Hugh Panter – Co-Founder, Joint Chief Executive and Creative Director, Ambassador Theatre Group. For services to Theatre.
- Professor Christopher Antoniou Pissarides FBA – School Professor of Economics and Political Science, London School of Economics and Political Science. For services to Economics.
- Anthony Robinson – For public and political service
- David Richard Alexander Scott CBE – Chief Executive, Digital UK (now Everyone TV). For services to Digital Switchover.
- Professor Nigel Richard Shadbolt – Professor of Artificial Intelligence, University of Southampton. For services to Science and Engineering.
- Professor Michael Rudolf Stratton FRS – Director, Wellcome Trust Sanger Institute, for services to medical research.
- The Right Honourable Andrew Robert Stunell OBE MP – Member of Parliament for Hazel Grove. For public and political service.
- Professor Eric Jackson Thomas – Vice-Chancellor, University of Bristol and President, Universities UK. For services to Higher Education.

=== The Most Honourable Order of the Bath ===
==== Knight Grand Cross of the Order of the Bath (GCB) ====
===== Military Division =====
- General Sir Peter Wall KCB CBE ADC – Late the Corps of Royal Engineers

==== Knight Commander of the Order of the Bath (KCB) ====
===== Military Division =====
- Lieutenant General Richard Barrons CBE ADC – Late of The Royal Regiment of Artillery.
- Lieutenant General Adrian Bradshaw CB OBE – Late of The King's Royal Hussars.

===== Civil Division =====
- Jonathan Stephens – Permanent Secretary, Department for Culture, Media and Sport. For public service especially to the 2012 Olympic Games and 2012 Paralympic Games in London.

==== Companion of the Order of the Bath (CB) ====
===== Military Division =====
- Rear Admiral Ian Fergus Corder
- Major General Francis Hedley Roberton Howes OBE RM
- Major General Colin James Boag CBE – Late of the Corps of Royal Engineers
- Major General James Henry Gordon CBE – Late of The Royal Green Jackets
- Major General Andrew Charles Peter Kennett CBE – Late of The Parachute Regiment
- Air Vice Marshal Michael Guy Lloyd
- Air Vice Marshal Matthew John Gethin Wiles CBE

===== Civil Division =====
- Andrew Simon Campbell – Director of Strategy and Performance Team, Department for Communities and Local Government. For services to the CivilService and to Local Government Reform.
- Jeremy Patrick Stewart Crawford – Lately Chief Executive, UK Export Finance. For services to UK Exports.
- Melanie Henrietta Dawes – For services to the Civil Service in the field of Economic Policy.
- Elizabeth Gardiner – Parliamentary Counsel, Cabinet Office. For services to the Preparation of Legislation.
- Ann Frances Gross – Director of Foundation Years and Special Educational Needs Group, Department for Education. For services to Special Education and Social Care.
- Paul Graham Kirby – Lately Director, No 10 Policy Unit. For services to Public Service Reform.
- Allan Deverell Roberts – Lately Counsel to the Chairman of Committees, House of Lords. For services to the House of Lords.
- Jennifer Rowe – Chief Executive, UK Supreme Court and Trustee, Royal British Legion. For services to the Administration of Justice and to the Royal British Legion.

=== The Most Distinguished Order of Saint Michael and Saint George ===
==== Knight Commander of the Order of Saint Michael and Saint George (KCMG) ====
- Peter Richard Caruana QC – Politician, barrister and former Chief Minister of Gibraltar. For services to Gibraltar.
- Professor Alan Dashwood CBE QC – Emeritus professor, European law, University of Cambridge and professor, City University, London. For services to the development of European law.
- Simon Fraser CMG – Permanent under secretary and head of the Diplomatic Service, Foreign and Commonwealth Office. For services to the Foreign and Commonwealth Office and the pursuit of British foreign policy interests.
- David Reddaway CMG MBE – HM ambassador, Turkey. For services to British diplomacy and furthering UK interests in Turkey.

==== Companion of the Order of Saint Michael and Saint George (CMG) ====
- Doctor Dudley Charles Ankerson – Adviser. For services to furthering UK interests in South America.
- William John Clovis Meath Baker OBE – Director, Foreign and Commonwealth Office. For services to UK interests in the Middle East.
- Richard Martin Donne Barrett OBE – Formerly head, monitoring team, United Nations security council committee. For services to enhancing the implementation of sanctions regimes and international security.
- Joanna Margaret Burke – Director China, British Council. For services to the development of UK/China cultural relations.
- Professor William Rodolph Cornish QC – Emeritus professor of law, University of Cambridge. For services to promoting understanding of British law in central Europe.
- Alexander Wykeham Ellis – Director strategy, Foreign and Commonwealth Office. For services to British diplomacy and foreign policy development.
- Kevin Jeffrey Fitzgerald – Chief executive, Copyright Licensing Agency and chairman, Prisoners Abroad. For services to British economic interests, particularly the promotion of intellectual property internationally and the welfare of British nationals in prison abroad.
- Paul Madden – High commissioner, Australia. For services to British foreign policy and furthering UK interests in Australia.
- Peter Millett – HM ambassador, Jordan. For services to British foreign policy and furthering UK interests in Jordan.
- Peter Michael Alexander Wilson – Director Asia Pacific, Foreign and Commonwealth Office. For services to strengthening British foreign policy in Asia.

=== Royal Victorian Order ===
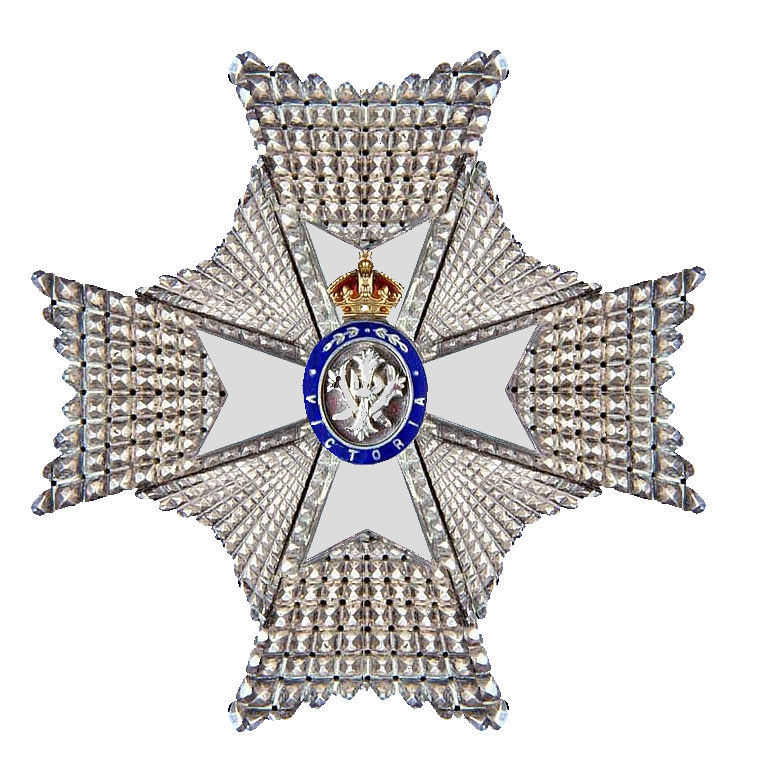
Insignia of a Knight / Dame Commander of the Royal Victorian Order

==== Dame Grand Cross of the Royal Victorian Order (GCVO) ====
- The Right Honourable Susan Hussey, Baroness Hussey of North Bradley DCVO – Lady in Waiting to The Queen.
- The Honourable Dame Mary Anne Morrison DCVO – Lady in Waiting to The Queen.

==== Knight Commander of the Royal Victorian Order (KCVO) ====
- Eric Dancer CBE – Lord Lieutenant of Devon

==== Commander of the Royal Victorian Order (CVO) ====
- Catherine Margaret Dean – Lord-Lieutenant of Fife
- Elisabeth Aline Clare Hunka LVO – Director of Personnel, Royal Household.
- Marcus James O'Lone LVO – Land Agent, Sandringham Estate.
- The Honourable James Henry Leigh-Pemberton – Receiver-General, Duchy of Cornwall.
- Major Alexander Richard Trotter – Lord-Lieutenant of Berwickshire

==== Lieutenant of the Royal Victorian Order (LVO) ====
- Michael Philip Batt . For services to the Royal Household.
- Doctor Trevor Austin Carmichael QC, formerly Trustee, The Duke of Edinburgh's International Award Foundation.
- Mark Fromont MVO RVM, Head Chef, Royal Household.
- Alison Frances Moore-Gwyn , formerly Chief Executive, National Playing Fields Association
- Lieutenant Colonel Edward Lloyd-Juke OBE, Yeoman Usher of the Black Rod.
- Robert Guy Mitchell MVO, Head of Human Resources, Duchy of Cornwall.
- Patrick Derek Passley , formerly Trustee, The Prince's Trust.
- Michael Richard Sefi , Keeper of the Royal Philatelic Collection.
- Adrian Michael Smith MVO, Assistant to the Master of the Household, C Branch, Royal Household.
- Amanda Jane Thirsk , Private Secretary to The Duke of York.

==== Member of the Royal Victorian Order (MVO) ====
- Malcolm Anthony Barrett RVM – Custodian, California Stores and the Royal Mausoleum.
- Professor Rodney Brazier – For services to Constitutional Law.
- Jennifer Ruth Chapman – Formerly Secretary to Princess Alexandra, the Honourable Lady Ogilvy.
- Jacqueline Patricia Clarke – Retail Operations Manager, Royal Collection.
- Nicholas John Dawson – Deputy Head, Aberdovey Centre, Outward Bound.
- Bernard Patrick John Flannery RVM – Head Butler, Household of The Prince of Wales and The Duchess of Cornwall.
- Major Peter Antony Flynn – Equerry to The Prince of Wales and The Duchess of Cornwall.
- Richard John Furstenheim – Organist and Director of Music, Chapel Royal, Windsor Great Park.
- Peter Gates – Management Accountant, Royal Collection Enterprises Limited.
- Lucinda Emma Mina Gibbon – Personal Assistant to the Comptroller, Lord Chamberlain's Office.
- Sergeant John Graham Hazel – Metropolitan Police. For services to Royalty Protection.
- Terence Charles Holdforth RVM – House Manager and Butler, Royal Lodge.
- Sergeant Stuart Dale Richards – Metropolitan Police. For services to Royalty Protection.
- David William Ripley – Director of Learning and Adventure, Outward Bound Trust.
- Claudia Catherine Spens – Head of General Correspondence, Household of The Prince of Wales and The Duchess of Cornwall.
- Helen Margaret Walch – Public Enterprises Manager, Sandringham Estate.
- Andrew Westwood – Communications Systems Analyst, Royal Household.
- Gary Michael Wilson RVM – Chief Gilder, Royal Household.

=== Royal Victorian Medal (RVM) ===
==== Bar to the Royal Victorian Medal (Silver) ====
- Frederick Arthur Ind RVM – Estate Worker, Highgrove.

==== Royal Victorian Medal (Silver) ====
- Robert Idwal Bellis, Yeoman Warder, H.M. Tower of London.
- Alexander Douglas Burnett, Yeoman Bed Goer, The Queen's Body Guard of the Yeomen of the Guard.
- Teresa Rose Coolahan, Housekeeper, Wood Farm.
- Christopher Gay, Senior Porter, Palace of Holyroodhouse.
- Alexandra, Mrs. MacMillan, formerly Daily Cleaner, Palace of Holyroodhouse.
- Philippa Jane (Pippa) Ozard, Head Chef, Government House, Guernsey.
- Eila Rita Doreen Peters, formerly Upholsteress and General Assistant, Royal Household.
- James Martin Scurlock, Gardener, Highgrove.
- Ian Charles Watmore, Gamekeeper, Crown Estate, Windsor.
- Mark Welford, Team Leader, Landscape Unit, Crown Estate, Windsor.

=== The Most Excellent Order of the British Empire ===
==== Knight/Dame Commander of the Order of the British Empire (KBE/DBE) ====
===== Civil Division =====
- Susan Mary Bourne, Headteacher, The Avenue School, Reading, Berkshire. For services to Education.
- Professor Nicola Anne Cullum, Professor of Nursing, University of Manchester. For services to Nursing Research and Wound Care.
- Janet, Mrs. Wolfson de Botton CBE, Philanthropist. For charitable services to the Arts.
- Diana Margaret Ellis CBE, Executive Chair, British Rowing. For services to Rowing.
- Professor Anne Mandall Johnson, Professor of Infectious Disease Epidemiology, University College London. For services to the study of Infectious Diseases.
- Professor Hermione Lee CBE, President, Wolfson College and Professor of English Literature, University of Oxford. For services to Literary Scholarship.
- Professor Judith Anne Rees CBE, lately Director, London School of Economics and Political Science and Director, Grantham Research Institute on Climate Change and Environment. For services to Higher Education.
- Phyllis Somers, Philanthropist. For charitable services.
- Dana Ross-Wawrzynski, Executive Headteacher, Altrincham Grammar School for Girls. For services to Education.

===== Diplomatic Service and Overseas List =====
- Michael Moritz – Chairman, Sequoia Capital LLP, San Francisco, California, U.S. – For services to promoting British economic interests and philanthropic work.

===== Crown Dependencies =====
====== Jersey ======
- David Roderick Kirch. For services as a philanthropist to senior citizens of Jersey.

==== Commander of the Order of the British Empire (CBE) ====
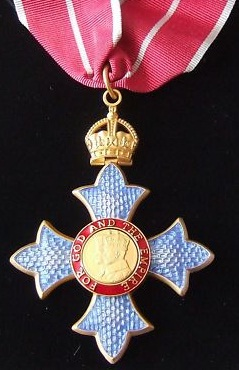
Neck badge of a Commander of the Military Division of the Order of the British Empire

===== Military Division =====
- Rear Admiral Jonathan Simon Westbrook MBE
- Commodore Christopher Martin Richards
- Commodore Michael Rupert Barry Wallace
- Major General Paul William Jaques, late of the Corps of Royal Electrical and Mechanical Engineers
- Major General Michael Lawrence Riddell-Webster DSO, late of The Black Watch
- Acting Major General Andrew Richard Darwen Sharpe OBE, late of The Cheshire Regiment
- Brigadier James Michael Cowan DSO OBE, late of The Royal Regiment of Scotland
- Brigadier Richard Ross Smith OBE, late of The Light Infantry
- Colonel Iain Gordon McKend , late of The Royal Logistic Corps
- Air Commodore Michael John Madoc Jenkins OBE
- Air Commodore Ian Richard William Stewart
- Group Captain Nigel James Phillips

===== Civil Division =====
- John Robert Henderson Agnew, Chairman, Henderson Group. For services to Business and to Charity in Northern Ireland.
- Susan Penelope Akers QPM, Lately Deputy Assistant Commissioner, Metropolitan Police Service. For services to Policing.
- Terrie Elizabeth Alafat, Director, Housing Growth and Affordable Housing, Department for Communities and Local Government. For services to Homeless People.
- Christopher John Allison, M.B.E., National Olympic Security Co-ordinator for London 2012. For services to the Security of the London 2012 Olympic and Paralympic Games.
- Dr. Ian Wilson Russell Anderson, lately President, Royal College of Physicians and Surgeons of Glasgow. For services to Emergency Medicine.
- Professor Helen ApSimon, Professor of Air Pollution Studies, Centre for Environmental Policy, Imperial College, London. For services to Air Pollution Science.
- Paul Archer, Head of Contact Centres, Department for Work and Pensions. For services to DWP Contact Centres and to charitable fundraising.
- John Peter Atkins, Chief Executive Officer, The Kemnal Academies Trust. For services to Education.
- Rowan Sebastian Atkinson, Actor and Comedian. For services to drama and charity.
- The Honourable Michael John Attenborough, Theatre Director and Producer. For services to the Theatre.
- Victoria Louise, Mrs Beer, Executive Principal, Ashton on Mersey School, Trafford. For services to Education.
- Simon James Robert Bland, Department for International Development Representative, Geneva. For services to Global Health.
- Claire Bloom, Actress. For services to Drama.
- Kenneth Peter Bounds. For services to the community in the City of Liverpool.
- Allan John Bowman, Chair, Social Care Institute for Excellence. For services to Social Care.
- Dr. Andrew Edward Brown, Deputy Chair, Environment Agency. For services to the Environment.
- Margaret Evelyn, Mrs. Buxton, (Dr. Aston) FBA, Ecclesiastical Historian. For services to Historical Scholarship.
- Dinah Elizabeth Caine, OBE, Chief Executive Officer, Creative Skillset. For services to the Creative Industries.
- Professor Terence Cave, FBA, Emeritus Professor of French Literature, University of Oxford. For services to Literary Scholarship.
- Pamela Joy, Mrs. Chesters, lately Chair, Action for Children. For services to Vulnerable Children.
- John Senan Cole, Deputy Secretary, Health Estates Investment Group, Northern Ireland Executive. For services to Healthcare Investment.
- John Charles William Compton, Chief Executive, Regional Health and Social Care Board. For services to Healthcare in Northern Ireland.
- Caroline Louise, Mrs. Cooper, Chief Operating Officer, Big Society Capital. For services to Social Investment.
- Professor John Anthony George Craven, Vice-Chancellor, University of Portsmouth. For services to Higher Education and to the community in Hampshire.
- Graham Dacre, Founder and Chair, OPEN Youth Trust and Lind Trust. For charitable services to Young People.
- Roger Alexander Deakins, Cinematographer. For services to Film.
- Hilary Lorraine Devey, Chairman and Chief Executive, Pall-Ex. For services to the Transport Industry and to charity.
- Sally Anne Sheila Dicketts, Chief Executive and Principal, Oxford and Cherwell Valley College and Chair, Reading College. For services to Further Education.
- Dr. Jennifer Dixon, Chief Executive, Nuffield Trust, London. For services to Public Health.
- John Drew, lately Chief Executive, Youth Justice Board for England and Wales. For services to Youth Justice.
- Geoffrey Driver, Leader, Lancashire County Council. For services to Local Government.
- Cecil Duckworth, O.B.E. For services to charity and to the community in Worcestershire.
- Gareth Evans, lately Deputy Director, Public Finances and General Team, Treasury Solicitor's Department. For services to Financial Stability.
- Iain Richard Evans, Chairman, LEK Consulting. For services to the Review of Defence Acquisition and the Consultancy Industry.
- John Frederick Farmer, Chairman, The Royal British Legion. For voluntary service to Ex-Servicemen and Women.
- Christine Farnish. For services to Financial Services and Consumer Affairs.
- Richard Findlay, Non-Executive Independent Chairman, STV Group plc. For services to the Arts and Creative Industries in Scotland.
- Robert Fleming, Philanthropist. For charitable services.
- Julian Wyatt Glover, Actor. For services to Drama.
- Alban Francis Xavier Green, Chief Executive, Leigh Academies Trust, Kent. For services to Education.
- Peter Anthony Griffiths, Lately Chairman, Queen Victoria Hospital NHS Foundation Trust. For services to Healthcare.
- Professor Philip John Gummett, Lately Chief Executive, Higher Education Funding Council for Wales. For services to Higher Education in Wales.
- Professor Michael Harmer, Chair, Welsh Health Specialist Services Committee. For services to Healthcare.
- Malcolm Gareth Hayday, Chief Executive Officer and Founder, Charity Bank. For services to charities and Social Enterprise.
- Professor Anthony Francis Heath, FBA, Professor of Sociology, University of Manchester and Emeritus Professor of Sociology University of Oxford. For services to Social Science.
- Thomas Alexander Heatherwick, Founder, Heatherwick Studio. For services to the Design Industry.
- Dr Carol Homden, Chief Executive, Thomas Coram Foundation for Children. For services to Children and Families.
- Dennis Vincent Hone, Chief Executive Officer, Olympic Delivery Authority. For services to the London 2012 Olympic and Paralympic Games.
- Jonathan Peter Joures, Director, Universal Credit Business Transformation, Department for Work and Pensions. For services to the Reform of Workplace Pensions and voluntary service to Disadvantaged Children.
- John Keelty, Director, Finance Planning and Performance, H.M. Revenue and Customs. For services to Improving Tax Systems.
- Iain Benjamin King, Stability Adviser, Department for International Development. For services to Governance in Libya, Afghanistan and Kosovo.
- Pauline, Mrs. Leeson, Chief Executive, Children in Northern Ireland. For services to Children in Northern Ireland.
- Richard Lewis, Chairman, Sport England and lately Executive Chair, Rugby Football League. For services to Sports Administration.
- Geoffrey Howard Lister. For services to Training in the Construction Industry.
- Wade Cleone Lyn, Founder and Managing Director, Cleone Foods and Board Member, Greater Birmingham and Solihull LEP. For services to Business in the West Midlands.
- Charles Dorsey Mackay, Chairman, Historic Royal Palaces. For services to Heritage and Conservation.
- Professor Alison Murray MacLeod, Professor of Medicine, Aberdeen University. For services to Life Science Research.
- Paul Martin. Ministry of Defence. For services to Defence.
- Allan Johnstone Massie, Journalist and Author. For services to Literature.
- Kathleen Denise McDonagh, Director of IT Delivery, Shared Services Directorate, Home Office. For services to Information Technology.
- Neil Scott Wishart McIntosh, Chief Executive Officer, CfBT Education Trust. For services to Education.
- Dr. Robert McIntosh, Director Scotland, Forestry Commission. For services to Forestry.
- Dr. Ruth Mitchell McKernan, Senior Vice President, Pfizer and Chief Scientific Officer, Neusentis. For services to Business and Innovation.
- David McLetchie, M.S.P., Member of the Scottish Parliament and former Leader of the Scottish Conservative Party.
- Peter Francis McNaney, Chief Executive, Belfast City Council. For services to Local Government and the community.
- Peter William Mead, Co-Founder, Abbott Mead Vickers. For services to the Creative Industries.
- Ronnie Edward Mercer, Chairman, Scottish Water. For services to the Public Sector Water Utility in Scotland.
- David Frederick Montague, Group Chief Executive, London and Quadrant. For services to Housing in London.
- Paul Richard Morgan, Regional Director, South East and Europe, UK Border Force, Home Office. For services to Border Safety and Security.
- Dale Jane, Mrs. Murray, Entrepreneur and Business Investor. For services to Business.
- Professor (Thomas) Hugh Pennington, F.R.S.E., Emeritus Professor of Bacteriology, University of Aberdeen. For services to Microbiology and Food Hygiene.
- Grayson Perry, Ceramic Artist. For services to Contemporary Art.
- David John Pitchford, L.V.O., Head of Profession, Major Projects Authority. For services to Government Project Management.
- Jane Platt, Chief Executive, National Savings and Investments. For Financial Service to the UK.
- Linda, Mrs. Pollard, O.B.E., D.L. For services to Business and to the community in Yorkshire and the Humber.
- Dr. Leonard Selwyn Polonsky, Philanthropist. For charitable services.
- Councillor Gary Andrew Porter, Leader, South Holland District Council and Vice Chairman, Local Government Association. For services to Local Government.
- Samuel Brian Rea, M.B.E., Chair, Northern Ireland Policing Board. For services to Policing and the community in Northern Ireland.
- Jonathan Alistair James Reekie, Chief Executive, Aldeburgh Music. For services to Music.
- Joanna Mary Reid, Deputy Director, Department for International Development. For humanitarian service to Yemen.
- Emma, Mrs. Rice, Founder, Emma Bridgewater Ltd. For services to Industry.
- Susan Lloyd-Roberts MBE, Journalist. For services to Journalism.
- Professor Anthony George Rudd, National Clinical Director for Stroke, St Thomas's Hospital, London. For services to Stroke Medicine.
- Jasvinder Sanghera, Founder, Karma Nirvana. For services to Victims of Forced Marriage and Honour- based Violence.
- Donald Anthony Sargent, General Director, Sage Gateshead. For services to the Arts in North East England.
- Professor John Peter Scott FBA, Pro Vice-Chancellor, University of Plymouth. For services to Social Science.
- David Anthony Sargent, General Director, Sage Gateshead. For services to the Arts in North East England.
- Jeanette Siddall, For services to Dance.
- Professor James Ferguson Skea OBE, Professor of Sustainable Energy, Centre for Environmental Policy, Imperial College London. For services to Sustainable Energy.
- Christie Smith, lately Head of Police and Fire Reform Division, Scottish Government. For services to Emergency Services Reform in Scotland.
- John Kevin Smith, Q.P.M., lately Chief Constable, Central Scotland Police. For services to Law and Order in Central Scotland.
- Dr. John Andrew Spence, O.B.E., D.L., Chairman, South East Local Enterprise Partnership. For services to Business in the South East.
- Nicholas Frederick Starr, Executive Director, National Theatre. For services to Theatre.
- Brian Stein. For services to Business and to the community in Leicestershire.
- Max Laurence Steinberg, O.B.E. For services to Business and to the community in Liverpool.
- Gailene Patricia Stock, A.M., Director, Royal Ballet School. For services to Dance, (To be dated 5 June 2013.)
- Oliver Henry James Stocken, Chair of the Trustees, Natural History Museum. For services to the Arts.
- John Edward Taylor, lately Chief Executive Officer, Advisory, Conciliation and Arbitration Service. For services to Employment Relations.
- Jonathan Bruce Taylor, Deputy Director, Pandemic Influenza Programme and Deputy Director, Olympic and Paralympic Health Programme, London. For services to Public Health.
- Dorothy Carrington, Mrs. Thompson, Chief Executive, Drax Group plc. For services to the UK Electricity Industry.
- Anthony Tomei, lately Director, The Nuffield Foundation. For services to education.
- Teresa Margaret, Mrs. Tunnadine, Headteacher, the Compton School, London Borough of Barnet. For services to Education.
- Elaine Joy, Mrs. Beardsley-Turton, Head of People Development, HR, Child Maintenance Group, Department for Work and Pensions. For services to Child Support.
- David Peter Walden, Board Member, Affinity Trust. For services to Health and Social Care.
- Anthony Stanley Lau-Walker, Chief Executive, Eastleigh College and Member, UK Commission for Employment and Skills. For services to Further Education.
- Professor Jeremy Daniel McKendrick Watson, Director, Global Research, Arup. For services to Engineering.
- Professor Albert Peter Weale, University College, London. For services to political science.
- Victoria Kirstyn Williams, A.M., Member of the Welsh Assembly for Brecon and Radnorshire. For public and political service.
- William Winters, Chief Executive Officer, Renshaw Bay. For services to the Economy and UK Financial Services Industry.
- Neil Russell Woodford, Head of UK Investment, Invesco Perpetual. For services to the Economy.

===== Diplomatic Service and Overseas List =====
- Timothy Heyman, President, 'Heyman y Asociados, S.C.'. For services to UK/Mexican finance and investment and philanthropy.
- Haim Judah Michael Levy, Lawyer and Founder, Gibraltar Community Care Ltd, Gibraltar. For services to the economy and to the community in Gibraltar
- The Honourable Alex Scott JP, Lately Member of Parliament and former Premier, Bermuda. For services to Bermuda.

==== Officer of the Order of the British Empire (OBE) ====
===== Military Division =====
- Acting Captain Andrew James Elvin, Royal Navy.
- Captain Matthew Sean Harrison, Royal Navy.
- Colonel James Kyle Hutton, Royal Marines.
- Commodore William John Keegan, Royal Navy.
- Captain Guy Antony Robinson, Royal Navy.
- Commander Mark Roger Savage, Royal Navy.
- Wing Commander Philip Jeremy Robinson, D.F.C., Royal Air Force
- Lieutenant Colonel William Stewart Codrington Wright, M.B.E., late The Rifles

===== Civil Division =====
- Adesola Olumide Adetosoye, lately Divisional Director, Children and Young People's Services, Lambeth Council. For services to Children and Young People.
- Kwame Akuffo, J.P., lately Member, Social Security Advisory Committee. For services to Social Policy and to the community in West London.
- Hilary Alexander, Fashion Editor. For services to Fashion Journalism.
- Susan Margaret Anderson, Council Member, Advisory Conciliation and Arbitration Service and Member, Low Pay Commission. For services to Employment Relations.
- Brian Annable. For services to Cycling.
- David Ulrich Armitage. For services to charitable giving in Yorkshire and the UK.
- Alan David Armstrong, Chairman and Chief Executive Officer, Almac Group. For services to the Economy in Northern Ireland.
- Professor Wendy Shelia Atkin, Professor in Gastrointestinal Epidemiology, Imperial College London. For services to Bowel Cancer Prevention.
- Trevor Baker, Ministry of Defence. For services to Defence.
- Clare Victoria Balding, Sports Presenter and Journalist. For services to Broadcasting and Journalism.
- Georgina Elizabeth Balmforth, Grade 6, Head of Protective Security Section, Office for Security and Counter Terrorism, Home Office. For services to Protective Security.
- Edward Barber, Co-Founder, Barber and Osgerby. For services to the Design Industry.
- Derek Alan Barnett, lately Chief Superintendent, President Police Superintendents' Association of England and Wales. For services to Policing.
- Kamal Basran, Founder, The Authentic Food Company. For services to Business and Charity.
- Arthur Leonard Jack Bate, Disability Adviser, Hertfordshire Council. For services to People with Disabilities in Hertfordshire.
- Rachel Catherine Christie Below, Finance Business Change Lead, Home Office. For services to Government Financial Management.
- Susan Jane Bernhauser, lately Dean of Human and Health Sciences, University of Huddersfield. For services to Nursing.
- Andrea Lesley Bilbow, Founder and Chief Executive, Attention Deficit Information and Support Service. For services to People with Attention Deficit and their Families.
- Ann Black, Secretary, Constituency Labour Party, Oxford East. For parliamentary and political service.
- Derek Booker, Director, Lagan Legacy. For services to Maritime and Industrial Heritage in Northern Ireland.
- (John) Richard Boulter, Group Head, Growth and Livelihoods, Department for International Development. For services to Reconstruction in Afghanistan.
- Ernest Colin Brace, Chairman, Brace's Bakery. For services to the Baking Industry and to the community in Wales.
- Norma Susan Brier, J.P. For services to Children and People with Learning Disabilities.
- Robert James Broadhurst, Q.P.M., lately Commander, Metropolitan Police Service. For services to Public Order Policing of the London 2012 Olympic and Paralympic Games.
- Christian Philip Teilo Brown. For voluntary and charitable services to the community in Monmouthshire.
- William McKenzie Brown, lately Principal Officer for Energy Efficiency, Glasgow City Council. For services to the Reduction of Fuel Poverty in Glasgow.
- Russell Bryan, Ministry of Defence. For services to Defence.
- Richard Bullock, D.L. For services to the Shrievalty in Nottinghamshire and Derbyshire and to the community in Nottingham.
- Kathryn Jane Campbell, lately Manager, Eco- Schools Scotland. For services to Environmental Education and Sustainable Development.
- Rosemary Campbell, lately Board Member and Choir, UK Network of Sex Work Projects. For services to Vulnerable Women.
- John Maither Carnochan, Q.P.M., lately Head, National Violence Reduction Unit. For services to Community Safety.
- Dora Clark, Head of Reference Services, House of Commons Library. For services to the House of Commons.
- Diane Clarke, Field Director for the North of England, Conservative Party. For public and political service.
- Lesley Mary Clarke, Chair, Women in Local Government Association. For services to Local Government.
- Martin Alan Clarke, Chief Executive, British Precast Concrete Federation. For services to Industry.
- Ishika Nita Clarke. For services to Employee Engagement and Business.
- James Andrew Clifford, Business Adviser and Head, Charity and Education Sector Advisory Team, Baker Tilly Chartered Accountants. For services to Social Investment.
- Robert Collington, Operations Director, Thames Water. For services to Consumers in London and the Thames Valley, particularly during Drought.
- Norman Cooke, lately Headteacher, Cloughside College, Prestwich, Manchester. For services to Education.
- Allen Worgan Cotton. For services to Agriculture and to the community in Somerset.
- David John Wilson Crabbe, Grade 7, Department for Regional Development, Northern Ireland Executive. For service to Governance and to the community in Northern Ireland.
- Michael Davies, Chair, The Royal Mint and Chair, Manchester Airports Group. For services to Business.
- Peter James Davis, Grade 6, Ministry of Defence. For services to the Armed Forces, especially in support of Afghan Operations.
- Professor Rosemary Deem, Vice-Principal (Education) and former Dean of History and Social Science, Royal Holloway, University of London. For services to Higher Education and Social Science.
- Rita Marie Dexter, Deputy Commissioner, London Fire Brigade. For services to Local Government and to the Fire and Rescue Service in London.
- Kay Dimelow, Headteacher, Huntingdon Nursery School and Director, Huntingdon Town Children's Centre. For services to Education.
- Professor John Michael Dixon, Breast Cancer Surgeon, Western General Hospital, Edinburgh. For services to the Treatment of Breast Cancer and for charitable services.
- Professor Peter James Dobson, Director, Oxford University, Begbrooke Business and Science Park. For services to Science and Engineering.
- Professor Jenny Linda Donovan, Professor of Social Medicine, School of Social and Community Medicine, University of Bristol, South West. For services to Social Medicine.
- Claire Dove, M.B.E., D.L., Chief Executive, Blackburne House and Chair, Social Enterprise UK. For services to Social Enterprise.
- John Francis Duffy, Secretary, Fire Brigade Union Scotland. For services to the Fire and Rescue Service in Scotland.
- Sarah Jane Dunnett, Chair, Dartford and Gravesham NHS Trust. For services to the National Health Service.
- Steven Edwards, Social Entrepreneur. For services to Philanthropy and Higher Education.
- Stephen Eley, Grade 6, Ministry of Defence. For public service, especially in support of the London 2012 Olympic and Paralympic Games.
- David Ellis. For services to People with Learning Disabilities.
- James Stuart Espey. For services to the Whisky Industry. Professor Dylan Jones-Evans, Economist. For public and political service.
- Keith Abel Falconer, lately Head of Regional Office, Royal Commission on the Historical Monuments of England. For services to Industrial Architecture.
- Robin Ian Wilson Fell, Principal Doorkeeper, House of Commons. For services to Parliament.
- Andrew Robert Finding, Chief Executive, British Equestrian Federation. For services to Equestrianism and the London 2012 Olympic and Paralympic Games.
- Joseph Fogg, Revaluation Liaison Officer, Valuation Office Agency. For services to Valuation.
- Professor Peter Fonagy, F.B.A., Chief Executive, The Anna Freud Centre. For services to Psychoanalysis and Clinical Psychology.
- Kathryn Estelle Foster, Temporary Grade 6, UK Border Force, Home Office. For services to Border Security and the London 2012 Olympic and Paralympic Games.
- Fiona Bernadette Fox, Chief Executive Officer, Science Media Centre. For services to Science.
- Dr. Jonathan Charles Frost, Director, Johnson Matthey Fuel Cells. For services to Innovation.
- Professor Graham Lytton Furniss, F.B.A., Professor of African Language Literature, School of Oriental and African Studies. For services to Higher Education and Scholarship.
- Maureen Ellen Garvie, lately Principal Estates Surveyor, Scottish Government. For services to Government Property Management.
- Pauline Gavin, Headteacher, St. Bartholomew's Church of England Primary School, Leeds. For services to Education.
- Anne Patricia Bull-George, Headteacher, Weston All Saints Church of England Primary School, Somerset. For services to Education.
- John Gilhooly, Director, Wigmore Hall. For services to Music.
- Stephen Hugh Glass, Grade 6, Ministry of Defence. For services to Defence Equipment Acquisition.
- Alan Glennie, Deputy Departmental Records Officer, Cabinet Office. For services to the Cabinet Office and Public Records Management.
- Pamela Jill Goldberg. For charitable and public service through the Breast Cancer Campaign and the General Advisory Committee on Science.
- David Michael Gordon, Head of Major Events, BBC Sport. For services to Broadcasting and the London 2012 Olympic Games.
- Laurence Graff, Founder, Graff Diamonds. For services to the Jewellery Industry.
- Alexandra Gray, Nurse Consultant, Scottish National Blood Transfusion Service. For services to Blood Transfusion.
- Professor Selwyn Michael Griffin, Consultant Surgeon and Professor of Gastrointestinal Surgery, The Royal Victoria Infirmary, Newcastle upon Tyne. For services to Health.
- Elliot Griffiths, J.P., lately Magistrate, West Glamorgan. For services to the Administration of Justice.
- Stephen John Grix, Principal, MidKent College. For services to Further Education.
- Gareth Gwenlan, Producer and Director. For services to Broadcasting.
- Eunice Julie Halliday, Project Co-ordinator, Plymouth Methodist Mission Circuit. For services to the community in Plymouth.
- Leonard Thomas Hatton, Chairman and President, SportsAid. For services to Sport.
- Anthony James Heaton, Chief Executive, Shape Arts. For services to the Arts and the Disability Arts Movement.
- Patrick Kurk Heisel, Head of Bureaucracy Reduction for Schools, Department for Education. For public service to Education and Diversity and voluntary service through the Special Constabulary.
- Dr. Josephine Hockley, Nurse Consultant, St. Christopher's Hospice. For services to Palliative Care Nursing.
- Janet Hodges, J.P., Chief Executive Officer, The Edge Foundation. For services to Further and Higher Education.
- Tina Holmes. Ministry of Defence. For service to Defence.
- Mandy Johnston Hope, Grade 7, Ministry of Defence. For public service, especially in support of the London 2012 Olympic and Paralympic Games.
- Christian Edward Johnston Horner – Team Principal, Red Bull F1 Team – for services to Motorsport.
- Professor James Hough, F.R.S., F.R.S.E., Chief Executive, Scottish Universities Physics Alliance and Research Professor in Natural Philosophy, University of Glasgow. For services to Science.
- Sharron Hughes, Head of Learning and Development Operations, Crown Prosecution Service. For services to Law and Order particularly in Learning and Development.
- David Hutchison, Chief Executive Officer, Social Finance. For services to Finance.
- David Ireland, Chief Executive, Empty Homes. For services to Housing.
- Albert Henry Thomas Irvin, Artist. For services to the Visual Arts.
- Andrew Stephen Vallance Jones, lately First Secretary (Migration), British Embassy, Kabul. For services to International Migration Operations.
- Doiran Jones, J.P., lately Chair, Melin Homes Ltd. For services to Housing in South Wales.
- Dylan Jones, Editor, GQ. For services to the Publishing and British Fashion Industry.
- Teresa Kelly, Principal, Abingdon and Witney College. For services to Further Education and Young People with Learning Difficulties and Disabilities.
- Michael Johnathan Kent, Chief Executive Officer, Bromford Housing Group. For services to Social Housing.
- Professor Janice Mary Kirkpatrick, Co-Founder, Graven Images. For services to Graphic Design.
- James Scott Lambert, Executive Chairman and CEO, R&R Ice Cream. For services to Manufacturing in North Yorkshire.
- Paul Lawrie, M.B.E, Golfer and Founder, the Paul Lawrie Foundation. For voluntary service to Golf.
- Professor Malcolm Lewis, Sub-Dean and Director of General Practice Education, Wales Deanery, Cardiff University. For services to Medical Education.
- Sylvia Libson, Executive Headteacher, Furness Primary and Oakington Manor Primary Schools, Brent. For services to Education.
- Gaye Linklater, lately Headteacher, Hermitage Park Primary School, Edinburgh. For services to Education.
- Dr. Janet Mary Little, Consultant, Public Health. For services to Healthcare in Northern Ireland.
- Robert Alan Lloyd, lately Councillor, Swansea Council. For services to Local Government and Democracy in Wales and Abroad.
- Alan William Mabbutt, Head of Local Government, Conservative Campaign Headquarters. For services to Local Government and Political Engagement.
- David MacLeod. For services to Employee Engagement and Business.
- Kenneth MacLeod, Chairman, Stena Line (UK) Ltd. For services to the Shipping Industry and Charity.
- Dr. Richard John Mantle, D.L., General Director, Opera North. For services to Music.
- Marie Marin, Chief Executive Officer, Employers Childcare Charitable Group. For services to Social Enterprise.
- David Andrew Martin, Designer, Interactive SmartBoard and Executive Chairman, SMART Technologies Inc. For services to Education.
- George Stephen Martin, Liaison Officer, The Prince's Trust. For services to Local Government.
- Richard David Martin, J.P., Head of Coastal Resources, Maritime and Coastguard Agency. For services to H.M. Coastguard.
- Nicholas Mason, Co-founder, Growing Against Gangs and Violence, London. For services to Young People.
- Kiki Maurey, Founder, Kiki Maurey Consultancy Ltd. For services to Women and Minority Groups in Business.
- Norman Derek McBurney, Founder and Director, McBurney Transport Group. For services to the Haulage Industry and the community through Ballymena United Football Club.
- Shaun Patrick McCarthy, Chair, Commission for Sustainable London 2012. For services to Sustainability and to the London 2012 Olympic and Paralympic Games.
- Derek Stuart McGill, Governor in Charge, H.M. Prison Barlinnie, Scottish Prison Service. For public service to the Scottish Prison Service.
- Alison McInnes, M.S.P., Member of the Scottish Parliament for North East Scotland. For public and political service.
- Amanda Eliza McMillan, Managing Director, Glasgow Airport. For services to Business and Tourism.
- Suraj Kumar Minocha, Crown Advocate, National Prosecution Team, Crown Prosecution Service. For services to Law and Order particularly the Early Guilty Plea Scheme.
- Dorab Erach Mistry, Vice-Chair, Inter-Faith Network UK. For services to the Zoroastrian community and to Inter-Faith Relations in the UK.
- Katherine Louise Mosse, Author and Co-founder, the Women's Prize for Fiction. For services to Literature.
- Dr. Helen Margaret Mounsey, lately Non-Executive Chair, Coal Authority. For services to the Environment and Coal Industry.
- Raymond Thomas Murray, Head of Information Systems and Records Management Division, Department of Justice, Northern Ireland Executive. For public and charitable services in Northern Ireland.
- James Edward Mutton, lately Principal and Chief Executive, Loughborough College. For services to Further Education.
- Joan Lee Myers, Nurse Consultant, Community Children's Nursing NHS, Whittington Heath. For services to Children and Nursing.
- Stephen Myers, Director of Accelerators and Technology, CERN. For services to Science and Technology.
- Geeta Nanda, Chief Executive, Thames Valley Housing Association. For services to Social Housing.
- Professor David Newman, Professor of Political Science and Geopolitics at Ben-Gurion University in Israel, For services to promoting scientific cooperation between the United Kingdom and Israel
- Lloyd Newson, Founder and Director, DV8 Physical Theatre. For services to Contemporary Dance.
- Professor Julia Alison Noble, Professor of Biomedical Engineering, University of Oxford. For services to Science and Engineering.
- Patrick James O'Connell, Senior Commercial Manager, Department for Work and Pensions. For services to DWP Estates and to the community in the London Borough of Harrow.
- Pauline Odulinski, Principal and Chief Executive, Aylesbury College. For services to Further Education.
- Professor Katherine Leni Oglesby, Member, Higher Education Funding Council for Wales and Member, Higher Education Funding Council for England. For services to Higher Education.
- Alan Opie, Operatic Baritone. For services to Music.
- Jay Osgerby, Co-Founder, Barber and Osgerby. For services to the Design Industry.
- Gareth John Danby Owen, Emergency Director, Save the Children. For services to Emergency Crisis Response Abroad.
- John Ifor Rewbridge Owen, Grade 6, Ministry of Defence. For services to Defence Research.
- Anne Catherine Oxborough, lately Assistant Principal, Exeter College. For services to Further Education.
- Michael Parker, lately Board Member, Sea Fish Industry Authority. For services to the Seafood Industry and the community in Grimsby.
- Wendy Ann Parry. For services to Community Relations through The Tim Parry Jonathan Ball Foundation for Peace.
- Naseem Sheema Parsons, Headmistress, St Mark's Square Nursery School, Regents Park, London. For services to Early Years Education.
- Barbara Payne, Senior Education Adviser, Department for International Development. For services to Education in Developing Countries.
- Charles Edward Hunter-Pease, Trustee, Royal National Lifeboat Institution. For services to Maritime Safety.
- Anthony Paul Pedder, D.L. For services to Business, Health and the Voluntary Sector in Sheffield.
- Professor Judith Eleri Phillips, Deputy Professor of Gerontology, Deputy Pro-Vice Chancellor and Director of the Research Institute for Applied Social Sciences, Swansea University. For services to Older People.
- Michael Phillips, Chair, Keep Britain Tidy. For voluntary services to the community and Local Environment.
- Robert Laurence Pickford, lately Director, Social Services for Wales. For services to Social Services and Social Care Standards in Wales.
- Jean Marian Pinkerton, lately Headteacher, Datchet St. Mary's Church of England Primary Academy. For services to Education.
- Phillip Jon Plowman, Comedy Producer. For services to British Comedy.
- Peter Frederick Posner. For services to the YMCA in the UK and Abroad.
- Michael Quicke, lately Trustee, National Trust. For services to National Heritage.
- Ian Quinton, lately Deputy Assistant Commissioner, Metropolitan Police Service. For services to Assurance Planning for the London 2012 Olympic and Paralympic Games.
- Steven Reed, M.P., lately Deputy Chair, Local Government Association. For services to Local Government.
- Richard David Regan. For services to the City of London Corporation and for voluntary service in London.
- Reginald Hunter Reid. For services to Architecture and Community Engagement in Glasgow.
- David Robinson, President, Speedo International. For services to Economic Development in the East Midlands.
- David John Kendal Rosbottom, Chair of Governors, Winstanley College, Wigan. For services to Education.
- Leslie Rose, Patron, Make-a-Wish Foundation UK. For services to Children and Families.
- Bridget Clare Rosewell. For services to the Economy.
- Andrew Campbell Ross, lately Chief Executive, The Children's Trust. For services to Children.
- Anthony Sadler, Policy and Technical Specialist and Team Leader, Business Tax, H.M. Revenue and Customs. For services to Tax Policy Work.
- Saleh Saeed, Chief Executive Officer, Disasters Emergency Committee. For services to Humanitarian *Work.
- Jeremy Sainsbury, Director, Natural Power. For services to Renewable Energy and to the community in Dumfries and Galloway.
- Toby Francis Sargent, Deputy Head of News, Department for Culture, Media and Sport. For services to Government Communications.
- Diane Rebecca Wendy Savory, (Mrs. Hill) Chair, Gloucestershire Local Enterprise Partnership. For services to Business in Gloucestershire.
- Karl Russell Seal, lately Chair of Council, University of Exeter. For services to Higher Education.
- David Andrew Seddon, Principal, Baxter Business and Enterprise College, Worcestershire. For services to Education.
- John Macfarlane Sellar, lately Crime Enforcement Officer, Convention on International Trade in Endangered Species. For services to Wildlife Conservation.
- Srabani Sen, Chief Executive Officer, Contact a Family. For services to Children and Families.
- Martin Walter Shaw, Beekeeper. For services to the National Bee Unit and to Bee Keeping.
- Shahid Sheikh, lately Chairman, Institute of Directors, Leicestershire. For services to Business in the East Midlands.
- Mark Peter Simmonds, lately International Director of Science, the Whale and Dolphin Conservation Society. For services to Environmental Science and Marine Mammal Conservation.
- Professor Monique Sheelagh Jacquard Simmonds, J.P., Director, Kew Innovation Unit. For services to Science, Environment, Technological Innovation and the community.
- Professor Margaret Campbell Smith, Dean of the School of Nursing and Midwifery, University of Dundee. For services to Healthcare.
- (Catherine) Anne Smyth, Deputy Chair, Standing Commission on Carers. Founder and Director, Carers' Resource, Harrogate and Craven, Bradford and Airedale. For services to Carers.
- Julia Mary Fownes Somerville, Chair, Government Art Collection Advisory Committee. For services to Art.
- Anna Southall. For public and charitable services.
- Jill Stein, Director, The Seafood Restaurant. For services to the Restaurant Industry.
- Danielle Caroline Stewart, (Mrs Bannister) Partner, Baker Tilly. For services to Accountancy and to Small Businesses.
- Dr. Mary Stiasny, Pro-Director, Learning and International, Institute of Education. For services to Higher Education.
- Jean Stogdon, Co-Founder and Co-Chair, Grandparents Plus. For services to Children and Families.
- Carol Anne Storer, Director, Legal Aid Practitioners Group. For services to Legal Aid.
- Clive Strowger. For voluntary services to Business and charity in London.
- Arlene Sugden, Head of Shared Services, H.M. Revenue and Customs. For services to Government Efficiency.
- Dr Cynthia Marie Sughrue, Chief Executive Officer and Executive Producer, Scottish Ballet. For services to Dance.
- Karen Sussex, Grade 7, Settlement Distribution and Policy, Local Government Finance, Department for Communities and Local Government. For services to Local Government Finance
- Dr. Anne Teresa Tate, Medical Adviser, Marie Curie Cancer Care and Deputy National Clinical Director for End of Life Care. For services to Palliative Care.
- Satinder Kaur Taunque, D.L. For voluntary and charitable services to Inter-Ethnic Relations and to the community in the West Midlands.
- Allison Tennant, Nurse Consultant, Peaks Unit, Rampton Hospital. For services to Offender Health.
- Linda Marcia Thompson, lately Head, Looked After Children's Education Team, London Borough of Ealing. For services to Education.
- Julia Mary Bunting Thring, lately Team Leader, AIDS and Reproductive Health, Department for International Development. For services to supporting Reproductive Health in Developing Countries.
- Adrian John Tinniswood. For services to Heritage.
- Susan Torrance, Chief Executive, Highland Housing Alliance. For services to Affordable Housing.
- James William Trail, Lately Managing Director, Power and Control, Raytheon Systems Ltd. For services to the Defence Industry.
- Charlotte Anne Triggs, Senior Policy Adviser, Crown Prosecution Service. For services to Law and Order especially Prosecution of Rape Cases.
- Rachel Elizabeth Tuffin, Head of Research, Analysis and Information, College of Policing. For services to Policing.
- Anne Wallace, Director, Starting Point Community Learning Partnership Limited. For services to Adult and Community Learning.
- Brenda Mary Wallace, lately Headteacher, Gumley House Convent School, Isleworth. For services to Education.
- Keith Alexander Walters, President, Amateur Boxing Association. For services to Amateur Boxing.
- Professor John Oliver Warner, lately Member, Advisory Committee on Novel Foods and Processes. For services to Food Allergy Research.
- Andrew Trace Allan Wates, D.L. For services to Family Business, charity and to the community in Surrey.
- Professor Christopher Michael Wathes, lately Chairman, Farm Animal Welfare Committee. For services to Animal Welfare.
- Patricia Watson. For services to Business and Disabled People.
- Stephen Robert Webb, Honorary Vice-President, National Association of Clubs for Young People. For services to Young People.
- Angela Marie Whelan, lately Headteacher, St. Paul's School for Girls, Edgbaston. For services to Education in Birmingham.
- Katie Jayne White, lately Head of International and UK Engagement, Department of Energy and Climate Change. For services to tackling Climate Change Engagement in the UK and overseas.
- Edward John Whitley, Founder and Trustee, Whitley Fund for Nature. For services to Wildlife Conservation.
- Vicki Wickham. For services to Music.
- Monica Julie Wiggins, (Monica Julie Fletcher) Chief Executive, Education for Health. For services to Nursing and Nurse Education.
- Dr. Patricia Anne Wilkie, President, National Association for Patient Participation. For services to Healthcare and Patient Involvement in the NHS.
- William John Wilkinson, Principal, Dromore High School. For services to Education in Northern Ireland.
- Catriona Ann Williams, Chief Executive, Children in Wales. For services to Disadvantaged Children, Young People and their Carers.
- Professor Christine Mary Williams, Pro Vice-Chancellor for Research and Hugh Sinclair Professor of Human Nutrition, University of Reading. For services to Higher Education and to Nutrition Science.
- Rosemary Williams, lately Managing Director, Rugby Football Union for Women. For services to Women's Rugby Union.
- William Anthony Willis, lately Managing Director, Euroforest Ltd. For services to the Forestry Industry.
- Patricia Janette Wilson, Grade 7, Ministry of Defence. For services to Defence.
- Alexander Daniel Holt-Wilson. For Ophthalmologist services to People in Ethiopia.
- Adrian William Winstanley, lately Director General, London Court of International Arbitration. For services to International Arbitration.
- Neil Wolstenholme, Application Delivery Centre, Major Programmes Project Management Office Lead, Corporate IT, Department for Work and Pensions. For services to Project Management.
- Dr. Andrew Charles Wood, Chief Executive, Adnams plc and Chairman, New Anglia Local Enterprise Partnership. For services to Business and the community in East Anglia.
- Anton Vincent Woodward. For services to Stage Automation.

===== Diplomatic Service and Overseas List =====
- Felix Alvarez, Equality and human rights worker. For services to the advancement of equality and human rights in Gibraltar.
- The Reverend Dr. Cyril Bernhard Axelrod, Consultant, Hong Kong Society for the Blind. For services to the development of deaf blind services in Hong Kong.
- John William Matthew Baugh, H.M. Ambassador, Somalia. For services to promoting peace and security in Somalia.
- Mark Gregory Beer, former Chairman, British Business Group, Dubai, and the Northern Emirates, and Registrar, Dubai International Financial Centre Courts, UAE. For services to advancing British business interests, promoting British exports and enhancing legal co-operation.
- Christopher John Chantrey, lately Chairman, British Community Committee, Paris, France. For services to the British community in France.
- Jacqueline Jill Collins, Writer. For services to fiction and to charity.
- Geoffrey Lynton Cooper, lately Deputy Head, EU Policing Mission, Afghanistan. For services to the development of policing in Iraq and Afghanistan.
- Michael Keith Dunstan, First Secretary, Foreign and Commonwealth Office. For services to the security of the London 2012 Olympic and Paralympic Games.
- Dr. Sarah Katherine Fane, Founder, Afghan Connection. For services to charitable work, particularly for young people in Afghanistan.
- Gillian Elizabeth Flaxman, Head, British Council School, Madrid, Spain. For services to international cultural relations and to education in Spain.
- William John Gelling, lately Private Secretary to the Right Honourable William Hague, M.P., Foreign Secretary, Foreign and Commonwealth Office. For services to British diplomatic interests.
- Timothy Gerrish, Head, Training and International Capacity Building, Child Exploitation and Online Protection (CEOP) Centre. For services to developing and supporting international child protection, particularly in South East Asia.
- Sian Jones, lately First Secretary, British High Commission, Islamabad, Pakistan. For services to UK national security.
- Rhondalee Moreen, Mrs. Braithwaite-Knowles, Deputy Attorney General, Turks and Caicos Islands. For services to the development and reform of the public service of the Turks and Caicos Islands.
- Simon John MacKinnon, Chairman, Sinophi Healthcare, Shanghai, China. For services to advancing British business in China, developing UK/ China trade and investment links, and charity work.
- Professor Nicholas Miles, Provost and Pro-Vice Chancellor, The University of Nottingham, Ningbo, China. For services to furthering UK/China educational interests.
- Peter James Mumford, lately First Secretary Economic and Financial, British Embassy, Beijing, China. For services to transforming UK financial interests in China.
- Nouria Nagi, Director, Yemen Education and Relief Organisation, Sana’a, Yemen. For services to charitable work transforming the lives of women and children in Yemen.
- Professor David Newman, Dean, Humanities and Social Sciences, and Professor, Politics and Government, Ben Gurion University, Israel. For services to higher education and the humanities and promoting academic links between the UK and Israel.
- Nicholas Andrew Nicolaou, lately Chief Executive Officer, HSBC Sri Lanka and the Maldives, Colombo, Sri Lanka. For services to promoting British business interests, arts, education and the English language in Sri Lanka.
- Cedric Rawnsley Osborne, M.B.E., Manager, M.S. Osborne Ltd., Montserrat. For services to promoting business interests in Montserrat.
- Eileen Lucia Stevens Parsons, Retired teacher, Parliamentarian and Minister, British Virgin Islands. For services to education and to the community in the British Virgin Islands.
- Andrew John Pearce, Head of Security, Estates and Security Directorate, Foreign and Commonwealth Office. For services to the safety of FCO staff, families and Embassies.
- Stanley Everton Reid, Deputy Governor, Anguilla. For services to Anguilla.
- The Very Reverend Canon David John Leyburn Richardson, lately Representative of The Archbishop of Canterbury to the Holy See and Director of the Anglican Centre, Rome, Italy. For services to strengthening relations between the UK, the Anglican Communion and the Holy See.
- Martyn Roper, H.M. Ambassador, Algeria. For services to UK interests in Algeria, particularly the UK response to the In Amenas hostage crisis.
- Stephen James Smith, Director General, The Anglo Mexican Foundation. For services to promoting British commercial, cultural and educational interests in Mexico.
- Brian Stainton, Engineer, lately Foreign and Commonwealth Office. For services to engineering and to local charitable and community support.
- Peter Gerald Maber Whawell, First Secretary, Foreign and Commonwealth Office. For services to UK national security.
- Patricia Jill Williamson, Trustee and Chair, Legal Assistance Trust. For services to promoting human rights and the rule of law in South Africa.

===== Crown Dependencies =====
====== Isle of Man ======
- James Anthony (Tony) Brown. For public and political service.

==== Member of the Order of the British Empire (MBE) ====
===== Civil Division =====
- Geoffrey Acott, Chef. For services to the Catering Industry.
- Andrew Adams, Chief Superintendent, Gwent Police. For services to Law Enforcement and Public Protection.
- Miss Adele Laurie Blue Adkins (Adele), Singer and Songwriter. For services to Music.
- Ms Olufunmike Olusola Omobola Asake Afuape, Chair, Afiya Trust. For services to Black and Minority Ethnic Health.
- Michael Patrick Aiken, Chairman, The Mary Rose Trust. For services to National Heritage.
- Dr. Mohammad Farqad Alamgir, Clinical Director for Cardiac and Neurosciences, Castle Hill Hospital, East Yorkshire. For services to Cardiology.
- Dr. Eric Stephen Albone, Director, Clifton Scientific Trust, Bristol. For services to Education.
- Bryn Aldridge. For services to the City of London Corporation and to Delivery of the London 2012 Olympic and Paralympic Games.
- Ms Ivy Alexander, Social Work Manager, Children and Young People's Services, Lambeth Council. For services to Children, Young People and Families.
- Miss Kay Alexander. For services to Broadcasting and to Charity in the West Midlands.
- Professor Neil McNeill Alford, Head, Department of Materials and Vice-Dean (Research), Faculty of Engineering, Imperial College London. For services to Engineering.
- Nina, Mrs. Amin, Tax Partner, KPMG. For services to the Asian Business Community.
- Susan Christine, Mrs. Anderson, Chief Executive Officer, Sue Anderson Consultants. For services to Education.
- Dr. Teresa Mary Anderson, Director, University of Manchester's Discovery Centre, Jodrell Bank. For services to Astrophysics.
- Ms Moira Lynne Andrew. For services to the Reduction of Domestic Abuse in Scotland.
- Ms Mary Margaret Andrews, lately Chair, Northern Ireland Fisheries Harbour Authority. For services to the Fishing Industry in Northern Ireland.
- Polly, Mrs. Anjam, Lead Radiographer, Velindre Cancer Centre, Cardiff. For services to Radiotherapy in Wales.
- Dennis Charles Arbon, Philanthropist. For services to the Arts and the community in Cornwall.
- Carole Ann, Mrs. Ashmore. For services to charitable fundraising in Bristol.
- Krishan Kant Attri, Volunteer Leader, Newcastle Hindu Temple. For services to Inter-Faith Relations in the North East of England.
- Piara Singh Aulakh. For services to the Sikh community in the London Borough of Hounslow.
- Stephan Aylett, Head of Physical Education and Assistant Head Teacher, Brynmawr Foundation School, Blaenau Gwent. For services to Education and to the community.
- Susan Elizabeth, Mrs. Bagot. For services to charitable giving in North West England.
- Noel Bailie. For services to Football in Northern Ireland.
- George Baker, Senior Officer, H.M. Prison Huntercombe. For services to the community.
- Simon Paul Bale, Police Communications Supervisor, Avon and Somerset Special Constabulary. For services to Community Policing in Somerset.
- Gillian Rosamond, Mrs. Balen. For services to Health and to the community in West Hertfordshire.
- John Bancroft, Founder, Badgemaster. For services to Business in Nottinghamshire.
- Professor Subrata Sekhar Banerjee, Professor of Mental Health and Ageing, Brighton and Sussex Medical School, University of Sussex. For services to People with Dementia.
- Dr. Barbara Ann Bannister, Consultant Physician, Royal Free Hospital, London. For services to Public Health.
- Dawn, Mrs. Barnard, Founder, Chelmsford City Ladies' Football Club. For services to Women's and Girls' Football in Essex.
- Christine, Mrs. Barnes. For services to Girlguiding and to the community in Burnley, Lancashire.
- Gary Barnes, Foster Carer and Adoptive Parent, West Sussex. For services to Children.
- Judith, Mrs. Barnes, Foster Carer and Adoptive Parent, West Sussex. For services to Children.
- Pamela Alice, Mrs. Barnes, Co-Founder, Action for Sick Children. For services to Child Health and Education.
- Oliver Barrett, Co-Founder, Start-Up Britain and Founder, Make your Mark with a Tenner. For services to Entrepreneurship and Business.
- Miss Margaret Baxter, Executive Officer, Operations, Department for Work and Pensions. For services to the DWP and voluntary service to WHEAT Mentor Support Trust.
- David Patrick Bell. For voluntary service to St. John Ambulance in London.
- James Bennet, Volunteer, The Prince's Trust and Patron, Action for Children. For services to Young People.
- Dr. Cyril James Bennett, Volunteer. For services to Riverfly Conservation.
- Dr. Lorna Ann Marie Bennett, Clinical Service Manager and Haemoglobinopathy Counsellor, Camden and Islington Primary Care Trust. For services to People with Blood Disorders.
- Gorande, Mrs. Bhatt, J.P. For services to the communities in Harrow and Wembley, North West London.
- Cheryl, Mrs. Blair, lately Executive Manager, CPA (UK) Ltd, Sheffield. For services to Promoting Accreditation to Quality Standards.
- Mary Elizabeth, Lady Bloomfield. For services to the community in Northern Ireland.
- Richard Mark Body, Director, Torrs Hydro New Mills Ltd. For services to the Hydro Electricity Industry.
- Joanne, Mrs. Bosanquet, Nurse Consultant, Public Health England. For services to Healthcare.
- Ms Kathleen Elizabeth Boullen, Chief Executive, St. Helen's Chamber. For services to Business in the North West.
- Miss Christine Bowker, Founder and Head Coach, Greenhead Gymnastics Club. For services to Gymnastics and the community.
- Robert Boyd, Director and General Manager, EDC Pipework Services Ltd. For services to the Pipeline Industry and to the community in Bo'ness, West Lothian.
- Peter Bernard Boyse. For services to the Hospice Movement and to the community in Lewes, East Sussex.
- Peter Joseph Brannigan, Sergeant, Police Service of Northern Ireland. For services to Policing and to the community in Northern Ireland.
- Marwood Thomas Braund, Chief Executive, Hearing Concern. For services to People with Hearing Impairments.
- Professor Paul Howard Bridges, Clerk to the council, University of Derby. For services to Higher Education.
- Rosanna, Mrs. Briggs, Deputy Head of Service and Deputy County Emergency Planning Officer, Essex County Fire and Rescue Service. For services to Civil Protection.
- Ms (Sonia) Penny Briscoe, Performance Director and Deputy Chef de Mission, British Paralympic Association. For services to Paralympic Sport and the London 2012 Olympic and Paralympic Games.
- David Andrew Brocklehurst, Chairman and Principal Director, The Kent Battle of Britain Museum Trust. For services to English Heritage.
- Lewis Richard Bronze, Chief Executive Officer, Espresso Education, London. For services to Education.
- Martin Gerard Brophy, Founder, Sing Out and Various Voices London. For services to Music and the community.
- Miss Tina Louise Brown, lately Manager, Remploy Leeds and Pontefract. For services to Disabled People.
- William Tudor Brown, Co-Founder and lately President, ARM Holdings. For services to the Electronics Industry.
- David Hugh Browne, Councillor, Belfast City Council. For services to Local Government in Northern Ireland.
- Ada Mary Maude, Mrs. Brownlie. For services to Fragile X Syndrome and Fragile X-associated Tremor/ Ataxia Syndrome Research.
- Robert Brydon. For services to Comedy and Broadcasting and for charitable services.
- John Allen Buckley, Mining Historian. For services to Cornish Heritage and History.
- Ms Suzanne Bull, Chief Executive Officer, Attitude is Everything. For services to Music, the Arts and Disabled People.
- Thomas Geoffrey Burrows. For services to the Arts and to the community in Burnley, Lancashire.
- John Michael Burton. For services to the Conservation of Historic Architecture.
- Freda Kathleen, Mrs. Bussey, Founder, Ashcombe Volleyball Club. For services to Volleyball.
- Colin Charles Butler, Volunteer, ChildLine West Midlands. For services to Children.
- Miss Helen Margaret Butler, Founder and Manager, Isle of Wight Squirrel Project. For services to Red Squirrel Conservation on the Isle of Wight.
- Kevin Patrick Caffrey. For services to Social Care through the Father Hudson's Society in Birmingham.
- Dr. Anthony Lawson Calland, Chairman, British Medical Association Medical Ethics Committee. For services to Healthcare and to the NHS in Wales.
- Helena Maria, Mrs. Cant. For services to People with Disabilities in Perth and Kinross.
- Jennifer Helen, Mrs. Capstick, Head of Early Intervention Team Development, Early Intervention Teams, London Borough of Hounslow. For services to Education.
- William Philip Theodore Carey. For services to the community and to charity in Bournemouth, Dorset.
- Dr. Lucy Maria Carpenter, Emeritus Fellow, Nuffield College, University of Oxford and Secretary, Blackfriars Overseas Aid Trust, Oxford. For services to Public Health in the UK and Abroad.
- Keith Cass. For charitable services to the Red Socks Campaign and to People with Prostate Cancer.
- Olwen Mary, Lady Cass. J.P., D.L. For services to the community in Cambridge.
- Francis Ikechukwu Chinegwundoh, Consultant Urological Surgeon, St. Bartholomew's Health NHS Trust. For services to the NHS.
- Dr. Jacqueline Ann Christodoulou, Chief Executive, The Safety and Reliability Society. For services to Vulnerable People.
- Abubakar Chunara, Founder, Trafford Muslim Society. For services to the Muslim community in Trafford, Manchester.
- Craig Stewart Clark, Chief Executive Officer and Founder, Clyde Space. For services to Technology and Innovation.
- Paul Clark. For voluntary service to the community in Northern Ireland.
- Celia Louise, Mrs. Ingham Clark, Medical Director, Whittington Hospital NHS Trust, London. For services to the NHS.
- Dorothy May, Mrs. Clarke. For services to Elderly People and to the communities in Pedmore and Little Cornbow, West Midlands.
- Ms Rebecca Astley Clarke, Founder, Astley Clarke. For services to the Jewellery Industry.
- Jacqueline Ruth, Mrs. Coates. For voluntary service to Ankylosing Spondylitis Sufferers in Swansea and District.
- Lynne Elizabeth, Mrs. Condell, Student Funding Manager, Liverpool John Moores University. For services to Higher Education.
- Alan George Conquest. For voluntary service to the Royal British Legion and SSAFA Forces Help in Cornwall.
- Catriona Susan Addie, Mrs. Cook, Rights of Way Campaigner. For voluntary service to the Environment in the UK.
- Sophie, Mrs. Cornish, Co-Founder, Notonthehighstreet.com. For services to Small Businesses and Entrepreneurs.
- Allan Cottle, Paramedic. For voluntary service to Royal Navy Search and Rescue Training.
- David Michael Coulter, Chief Instructor and Coach, Sakai Karate. For services to Karate.
- Mary Euphemia Elizabeth, Mrs. Coulter. For services to Young People through the Girls' Brigade and to the community in Ballyclare.
- Bradley Cox. For services to Young People and to the community in Canvey Island, Essex.
- Peter Alfred Cox, Botanist. For services to Horticulture and Plant Exploration.
- Ann Gainford, Mrs. Craig, Governor, All Saints Church of England VC Primary School, Winchester. For services to Education and the community in Winchester.
- Jannett, Mrs. Creese. For services to Community Cohesion in Stockport.
- Graham Charles Crimp. For services to Grassroots Sport in Wales, particularly Cricket.
- Miss Mavis Thelma Crofts. For voluntary service to the community in Flintshire.
- Desney Patricia, Mrs. Cromey. For services to Bereaved Children in Northern Ireland.
- Ms Sarah Curran, Founder, My-Wardrobe.com. For services to the Fashion Industry.
- Graham Carter Curwen. For public services to Health and to the community in Pilling, Lancashire.
- John William Brian Cushing. For services to the community in Lancashire.
- Andrew John Cuthbert, Founder and President, The Norfolk Boat (Sail Training) Ltd. For services to Young People.
- Dr. Paul James Randle Cuthbertson, Chairman, Wirral Hospice St. John's, Cheshire. For services to Palliative Care.
- Dr. Beverly Neil John Daily, General Practitioner and Chairman, Burnham Health Promotion Trust, Buckinghamshire. For services to Health and Wellbeing.
- Robert Dale, Administrative Officer, H.M. Revenue and Customs. For services to Taxpayers.
- Anne Margaret, Mrs. Dames, Parish Councillor. For services to Local Government and to the community in the Vale of Belvoir, Leicestershire.
- Christopher St.John Hume Daniel. For services to the History of Marine Navigation, Timekeeping and Sundials.
- Dr. Joan Lesley Daniels, Senior Reserve Manager, Fenn's Whixall and Bettisfield Mosses National Nature Reserve, Natural England. For services to Nature Conservation.
- Philippa Margaret, Lady Dannatt. For voluntary service to SSAFA.
- David John Dargie, Police Constable, West Midlands Police. For services to Policing and to the community through the Sea Cadets.
- Carolyn Lesley Eileen, Mrs. Date, Secretary and Chorus Manager, Bournemouth Symphony Chorus. For services to Music.
- Josephine Anne, Mrs. Davies. For services to the Women's Institute and to the community in Ceredigion.
- Terrance John Davies. For services to the community in Brynea and Llanelli, Carmarthenshire.
- Andrew George Dawson, Secretary, Sutherland Access Panel. For services to Disability Awareness.
- Govinder Singh Dhaliwal. For services to the community and Community Cohesion in Bradford, West Yorkshire.
- Clive Francis Dickens, Senior Technical Engineer, Thames Water. For services to the London 2012 Olympic and Paralympic Games.
- Anthony Albert Dight, HR Business Partner, H.M. Treasury. For public service to the Treasury.
- Ms Alice Docherty, lately Homelessness, Prison Health and Asylum Co-ordinator, NHS Greater Glasgow. For services to Homelessness, Health and Social Care Services.
- Ms Bernadette Mary Docherty, Board Member, Scottish Children's Reporter Administration. For services to Childcare in Scotland.
- Carolyn Elizabeth, Mrs. Dolan, Grade 7, Department for Transport. For services to Transport during the London 2012 Olympic and Paralympic Games.
- Joseph Donaghy, Chairman, Board of Governors, Our Lady of Lourdes High School, Ballymoney. For services to Education in Northern Ireland.
- Miss Denise Donovan, Senior Executive Officer, Operations, Department for Work and Pensions. For services to the DWP and to Unemployed People in Lambeth and Brixton.
- Jean Elizabeth, Mrs. Dorey, Foster Carer, Dorset County Council. For services to Children.
- Peter Charles Dorey, Foster Carer, Dorset County Council. For services to Children.
- John Stuart Downs, Managing Director, Cosmo Leisure. For services to the Leisure Industry.
- Peter Gordon Drake, Founding Member, Young Explorers Trust. For services to Young People.
- Christopher Duncan, Founder, Numatic International Ltd. For services to International Business.
- Miss Mary Dunleavy, Executive Officer, Operations, Department for Work and Pensions. For services to the DWP and the local community in Coventry.
- Professor Aline-Wendy Dunlop. For services to People with Autism in Scotland.
- Miss Samantha Dutton. For services to Young People and their Families in the Blacon community in Chester.
- Joan Alberta, Mrs. Eddings. For services to the community in Portsmouth, Hampshire.
- Susan Mary, Mrs. Edney, Foster Carer, Hertfordshire County Council. For services to Children and Families.
- Christine, Mrs. Edwards, Safety, Health and Environment Manager, University of Central Lancashire. For services to Higher Education.
- Linda, Mrs. Edwards, Co-Founder and Chief Executive, The Larches Community Charity. For services to Children and Young People.
- Mark Lochrin Edwards, Boatbuilder. For services to Boatbuilding, Heritage and the 2012 Diamond Jubilee.
- Mark Theodore Steward Edwards, Olympics Biometric Project Deputy Manager, UK Border Force, Home Office. For services to Border Security for the London 2012 Olympic and Paralympic Games.
- Meldrum Barclay Edwards. For services to Athletics and Charity.
- Lieutenant Colonel David Eliot. For services to the Somerset Military Museum in Taunton Castle.
- Dr. Christopher James Elliott, Proprietor, Pitchill Consulting. For services to Engineering.
- Iain Ellis, Chair, National Parent Forum of Scotland. For services to Education.
- Doreen Ann, Mrs. Engall, Vice-Chair, Humberside Fire Authority. For services to Local Government.
- Gwilym Thomas Evans. For services to the community in Powys.
- Timothy Rhys Evans, Music Director, Only Men Aloud. For services to Music and for charitable services.
- Margaret Constance, Mrs. Everson, Senior Officer, Bus Users Wales (UK). For services to Bus Users and to Transport in Wales.
- Jonathan Mark Falkingham, Founder and Group Chief Executive, Urban Splash. For services to Architecture and Regeneration.
- Councillor Paul Stephen Farmer, Member, St. Edmundsbury Borough Council. For services to the community in Suffolk.
- Danielle Charlotte, Mrs. Fenning, lately Higher Executive Officer, Ministry of Defence. For services in support of Military Operations.
- Celia Mary, Mrs. Ferguson, Founder, Sion Mills Building Preservation Trust. For services to the Built Heritage in Northern Ireland.
- Dr. Kevin Finnan, Founder, Motionhouse Dance Theatre. For services to Dance and the London 2012 Paralympic Games.
- Joseph Fisher, Founding Member and Technical Director, Walking on Air. For services to Disability Sport.
- Thomas William Wallace Forde, Non-Executive Director, Northern Ireland Memorial Fund. For services to Victims and Survivors of the Northern Ireland Troubles.
- Sylvia Sarah Ann, Mrs. Foster. For services to Nursing and Healthcare in Northern Ireland.
- Lindsay Garrett, Mrs. Fox. For services to charity and to the community in Hampshire.
- Roger Frank Fuggle. For services to Disabled Cricket.
- Melanie, Mrs. Futer, Manager, Off Campus Student Affairs, University of Nottingham. For services to Higher Education.
- Trevor John Gamble, Founder, Construction Plant Competence Scheme. For services to Training, Health and Safety in Construction.
- Toni, Mrs. Gardner, Foster Carer, Guildford, Surrey. For services to Children and Young People.
- James William Kirk Gauld, Chair, Strathallan Meeting Limited. For services to the Strathallan Highland Games.
- Virginia Eileen Hamilton, Mrs. Gayner, Chair, RNLI Central London Fundraising Committee. For services to Maritime Safety.
- Ms Kathryn Gee, Museum Curator and Adviser. For services to UK Heritage and Culture.
- Frank Gervin, Co-Founder, Clonoe Boxing Club. For services to the local community in Coalisland.
- Susan, Mrs. Gervin, Co-Founder, Clonoe Boxing Club. For services to the community in Coalisland.
- Dawn Elaine, Mrs. Giamas, Case Manager, Achieve North West, Bury. For services to the Rehabilitation of Offenders and to the community in Greater Manchester.
- Miss Jean Haining Gilbert. For services to the community in Garnock Valley, Ayrshire.
- Adrian Bryan Giles, Club Leader, Epsom and Ewell PHAB Club. For services to Children with Disabilities.
- Julia Gaye, Mrs. Giles, Club Leader, Epsom and Ewell PHAB Club. For services to Children with Disabilities.
- Martin Gill, Principal Officer, Serious Organised Crime Agency. For services to Law Enforcement.
- Karen Elizabeth, Lady Girvan. For services to the voluntary sector in Northern Ireland through Action Medical Research and Sparks.
- Ms Jacqueline Glasgow, J.P., Lead Nurse, Homerton University Hospital NHS Foundation Trust. For services to Healthcare.
- Jeanie Murray McGeachie, Mrs. Glass, Chief Executive, Glasgow Old People's Welfare Association. For services to the community in Glasgow.
- Richard Glasstone, Ballet Choreographer and Author. For services to Classical Ballet.
- John Alexander Glover, Chair, RAP Foundation. For services to charity and the community in Dumfries and Galloway.
- Michael Gough. For public service.
- David Matthew Graham, Founding Member and Chair, Lyvenet Community Trust, Cumbria. For services to the community in Crosby Ravensworth.
- Janet Rose, Mrs. Graham, Hospital Volunteer, Luton and Dunstable Hospital NHS Foundation Trust. For services to Healthcare and Patients.
- Miss Marlyn Grant, lately Depute Head Teacher, Riverbank Primary School, Tillydrone, Aberdeen. For services to Education.
- Harry Gration, Radio and Television Broadcaster. For services to Broadcasting.
- Dr. Susan Elisabeth Greening, Clinical Director, Gwent Community Dental Service, Aneurin Bevan Health Board. For services to Dentistry in the UK.
- Simon Greenish, lately Director, Bletchley Park Trust. For services to English Heritage.
- Miss Elizabeth Jane Greer, Deputy Head, School of Business and Computing, Southern Regional College. For services to Education in Northern Ireland.
- John Edward Grint. For services to the community in Alsager, Cheshire.
- Catrina Elizabeth, Mrs. Gulliver, Female World Darts Champion. For services to Darts and to charitable fundraising.
- Professor John Michael Ferguson Gunn, Director of Research, College of Engineering and Physical Sciences, University of Birmingham. For services to Physics.
- Diane Heather, Mrs. Guy. For services to the community in Disley, Cheshire.
- Henry William Hadaway, Founder, Henry Hadaway Organisation. For services to the Creative Industries.
- Jameel Hadi, Manager, Participation Through Sport. For services to Young People in the North West of England.
- Ronald Sidney Halfacre, Founder and General Secretary, Sportsman's Senior Sunday Football League. For services to Football.
- Christopher John Hall, lately Assistant Principal, Joseph Chamberlain Sixth Form College, Birmingham. For services to Education.
- Ms Wendy Hallett, Entrepreneur, Hallet Retail, London. For services to Diversity in the Retail Sector.
- Ann Margaret Williams, Mrs. Hambly, Head of Special Educational Needs and Advance Skills Teacher, Queen Elizabeth's Grammar School, Ashbourne. For services to Education.
- Michile Mary, Mrs. Hargreaves, J.P., Executive Officer, Operations, Department for Work and Pensions. For services to Welfare and to the local community in Grimsby.
- Councillor Thomas Hargreaves, Mayor, St Helen's, Merseyside. For services to Local Government.
- Christine, Mrs. Harland, Vice Chair, Church Lane Partnerships Residents' Group, Middlesbrough. For services to the community in Middlesbrough.
- Miss Lynette Harries, lately Chair, Welsh Athletics. For services to Athletics in Wales.
- Joanne, Mrs. Harris, Author. For services to Literature.
- Mark Benedict Harrison, Senior Policy Adviser, Civil Society, Cabinet Office. For services to Charity Law.
- Ms Karen Harvey, Leader, Greenacre and Great Yarmouth Children's Centre. For services to Children and Families.
- Miss Polly Jean Harvey, Singer, Songwriter and Musician. For services to Music.
- Tracy, Mrs. Haycox, Director, Children and Young Peoples' Services, Safe@Last. For services to Children and Young People.
- Denzil Evans Haynes. For voluntary service to the RAF Association and the community in Neath, West Glamorgan.
- Dr. Robert William Heath. For voluntary service to St. John Ambulance in Bristol.
- Timothy Charles Hemsley, Sergeant, Sussex Police. For services to Policing and Counter-Terrorism.
- Colin Henderson. For services to The Duke of Edinburgh's Award and to the community in Northern Ireland.
- Miss Claire Henry, Director, National End of Life Care Programme. For services to Improving End of Life Care.
- Paul David Herbage. For voluntary service to St. John Ambulance in London.
- Dr. Michael Eric Henry Hersant. For services to the community in Penzance, Cornwall.
- Brian William Hewlett, Area Officer, Gloucestershire Special Constabulary. For services to Policing and to the community in Gloucestershire.
- Ms Nicola Kate Heyes, Founder and Chief Executive, soundLINCS. For services to Music.
- Ann, Mrs. Hill, J.P. For services to the community in Sheffield, South Yorkshire.
- David John Hill, Director, Olympic Operational, Logistics and Facilities, Metropolitan Police Service. For Logistical services to the London 2012 Olympic and Paralympic Games.
- Paula Karen, Mrs. Hilman, T/Superintendent, Police Service of Northern Ireland. For services to Policing and to the community.
- Miss Tracey Hinton, Administrative Assistant Typist, Criminal Investigation Professionalism and Capability, H.M. Revenue and Customs. For services to Taxpayers and Sport.
- Muriel Anstey, Mrs. Hirst. For services to the University of Reading.
- George Michael Hitchon. For services to the community in Ayr.
- Angus Munro Hogg. For services to the Carnegie Trust and to the community in Dunfermline, Fife.
- Irene, Mrs. Hogg, General Manager, Loanhead After School Club. For services to Children and Families in Loanhead, Midlothian.
- Brent Holder, Co-founder, CSI Steel Band Trust. For services to Music.
- Laurence Holloway, Musician and Co-founder, Montgomery Holloway Music Trust. For services to Music.
- Richard Holste, Chair of Corporation, Sussex Downs College. For services to Further Education.
- Dr. Susan Margaret Horner. For services to Literature.
- Joyce, Mrs. Howarth, J.P. For services to the community in Tameside, Greater Manchester.
- Stella, Mrs. Howarth, Chair, Allerdale Disability Association. For services to People with Disabilities and Disability Rights.
- Peter Huggins, Associate Director, Dance City. For services to British Dance.
- Paul Alexander Hughes, lately Teacher, Queensbury Upper School, Bedfordshire. For services to Education.
- Miss Heather Lamont Humby. For services to the community in Sandown, Isle of Wight.
- Christine Margaret, Mrs. Hunt, Director, Findhorn Village Centre. For services to the community in Findhorn, Morayshire.
- Ronald Philip Dudley Hunt, Chief Clerk, Government and Opposition Whips Office. For parliamentary and political service.
- Ian Michael Alwyn Blake Hurst. For services to Mountain Rescue in Derbyshire.
- Dr. Jana Elizabeth Hutt, Chair, Knockando Wool Mill Trust. For services to the Economy in Speyside.
- Judith Susan, Mrs. Ironside, Founder and Executive Director, UK Jewish Film. For services to Drama.
- Dr. Brian Irving, Manager, Solway Coast Area of Outstanding Natural Beauty. For services to Natural Heritage and Conservation in Cumbria.
- Thelma, Mrs. Jackson. For services to the communities in Prestbury, Macclesfield and East Cheshire.
- Christopher Jaeger, Founder and Chief Executive, Worcester Live. For services to the Arts in Worcestershire.
- Martin James, Higher Executive Officer, Operations, Department for Work and Pensions. For services to Jobseekers and voluntary service to Gloucestershire Army Cadets.
- Ruth Edith, Mrs. James, Founder, Aim for Change. For services to Sustainable Development in Uganda and Pakistan.
- Adam Jamieson, Ministry of Defence. For services to Defence.
- Ian Johnson, Higher Executive Officer, Corporate IT, Department for Work and Pensions. For services to the DWP and the Scout Association in Durham.
- Dr. Jeremy Richard Johnson, lately Medical Director, Severn Hospice, Shropshire. For services to Palliative Medicine.
- Major William Alan Johnston, T.D. For voluntary service to SSAFA in Aberdeenshire.
- Aled Jones. For services to Music and Broadcasting and for charitable services.
- David Jones, Anti-Kidnap and Extortion Unit, Serious and Organised Crime Agency. For services to Law and Order.
- Gareth Barrington Owen Rees Jones, Programme Manager, International Government Defence and Support Services, KBR. For services to the Armed Forces.
- Kathleen Mary, Mrs. Jones, Headteacher, St. Mary's Catholic Primary School, Wrexham. For services to Education in Wales.
- Margretta Lynnette, Mrs. Jones, Headteacher, Llangors Church in Wales Primary School. For services to Education.
- Peter Richard Jones, Sergeant, Ministry of Defence Police. For public service, especially in support of the London 2012 Olympic and Paralympic Games.
- Graham Dawson Jones. For services to School Rugby in Torfaen, South East Wales.
- Parminder, Mrs. Kaur, Union Learning Representative, Heathrow Worldwide Distribution Centre, Royal Mail. For services to Adult Education.
- Basir Sultan Kazmi, Poet. For services to Literature.
- Ms Joanne Hope Keogh, Police Staff, Metropolitan Police Service, Kingston upon Thames. For services to Victims of Domestic Violence.
- Lynn, Mrs. Kerfoot, Managing Director, Newland Engineering Company Ltd. For services to Business in Tameside.
- Ian James Kerr, Retired Police Officer. For services to Motorcycle Safety.
- Miss Denise Marie Kershaw, Detective Constable, Lancashire Constabulary. For services to Public Protection.
- Ayub Khan, Head of Library and Information Services, Warwickshire County Council. For services to Libraries in Warwickshire.
- Wasim Gulzar Khan, Director of Operations, The Cricket Foundation and Leader, Chance To Shine. For services to Cricket and the community.
- Rosie Phyllis, Mrs. Kilby. For voluntary service to the community in Huntingdon, Cambridgeshire.
- David James King, Retained Firefighter. South Wales Fire and Rescue Service. For charitable services and for services to the community in Porthcawl, Bridgend.
- Roderick Arthur Charles King, Road Safety Campaigner. For services to Road Safety.
- Katherine, Mrs. Kirk, Chair, South East Essex Primary Care Trust. For services to Public Health.
- Linda Jean, Mrs Kirk, Volunteer and lately Regional Chairman, the Conservative Party. For public and political service.
- Colin Kirkby. For services to the Environment and to the community in Powys.
- Stephen Lamb, Police Inspector, Humberside Police. For services to Policing and charitable Fundraising.
- Michael Ian Larking, Senior Executive Officer, Fire Safety Division, Department for Communities and Local Government. For services to Fire Awareness and Prevention.
- Peter Latham, lately PE Teacher, Otley, West Yorkshire. For services to Education and Sport.
- Brian Lawless, Chair of Governors, Northcote Primary School, Liverpool. For services to Education.
- Miss Margaret Lawson, Rural Community Transport Officer, Badenoch and Strathspey Community Transport Company. For services to the community in Badenoch and Strathspey.
- Caroline Eliza Georgina, Mrs. Dale-Leech, Honorary Secretary, the Carriage Foundation and Owner, Red House Stables Working Carriage Museum. For services to Heritage and to the community in the Peak District.
- Anthony David Lemons, Director of Physical Education, University of Cambridge. For services to University Sport.
- Deirdre, Mrs. Lennox, Senior Nurse Manager, Spruce House, Altnagelvin Hospital, Londonderry. For voluntary and charitable services in Northern Ireland.
- Drummond Donald Alasdair Leslie, lately Member of Council, Institute of Education, University of London. For services to Higher Education.
- Martin Leslie Levermore, Founder and CEO, Medical Devices Technology International Ltd. For services to Business in the West Midlands.
- Ms Briege Lewis, Neighbourhood Renewal Officer, Belfast Regeneration Office, Department for Social Development, Northern Ireland Executive. For services to Community Cohesion in Belfast.
- Carol Laurette, Mrs. Linforth, Volunteer, Labour Party. For parliamentary and political service.
- Alan Malcolm Little, Plant Manager, NACCO Materials Handling Ltd. For services to Industry in Northern Ireland.
- Graham Locke, Coastguard Rescue Officer. For voluntary service to Maritime Safety in Wales and the South West.
- Shirley Irene, Mrs. Logan, Palliative Care Clinical Nurse Specialist, Glan Clwyd Hospital, Betsi Cadwaladr University Health Board. For services to Palliative Care in North Wales.
- Susan, Mrs. Logan, Foster Carer, East Sussex County Council. For services to Children and Families.
- Robert Christopher Louden, Director General, Camping and Caravanning Club. For services to the Outdoor Leisure Industry.
- Alfred William Michael Love. For services to the community in Stratford-upon-Avon, Warwickshire.
- Patricia, Mrs. Lovett. For services to Heritage Craft and Calligraphy.
- David John Henry Loxton, lately Director of Membership and Development, the Liberal Democrats Party. For political service.
- Heather, Mrs. Luckman, Senior Executive Officer, Benefits Directorate, Department for Work and Pensions. For services to the Benefits System and to charity.
- Iain Duncan Mcinnes, J.P., Director, Loch Lomond and The Trossachs National Park Community Partnership. For services to The Trossachs National Park and to the community in Loch Lomond.
- Jeremy George Holroyde Mackrell. For services to charity and to the communities in Oxenhope and Keighley, West Yorkshire.
- Miss Jillian Maclean, Founder, Drake and Morgan. For services to the Hospitality Industry.
- Donald William Macleod, Coxswain, Bara Lifeboat, RNLI. For voluntary service to Maritime Safety in the Outer Hebrides.
- Christine, Mrs. Macrae. For voluntary service in the Western Isles.
- Francis George Major, J.P. D.L., Chairman, Northumbria Regional Flood and Coastal Committee. For services to Flood and Coastal Erosion Risk Management.
- Mari, Mrs. Major. For services to charities and to the community in Bridgend.
- Professor Jillian Rose Mann, Emeritus Consultant Paediatric Oncologist, Birmingham Children's Hospital NHS Foundation Trust. For services to Child Health.
- Councillor Gloria Ann Marsh, Member, Purbeck District Council. For services to Local Government and to the Environment.
- Simon David Marsh, Member, National Planning Policy Framework Practitioners Advisory Group. For services to Local Government and to communities in the UK.
- Professor Catherine Rosemary Martin, Biologist and Editor-in-Chief, The Plant Cell. For services to Plant Biotechnology.
- Dr. Nirmale George (Sally) Mathew, Associate Specialist, Parkinson's Disease Unit, Edgware Community Hospital, London. For services to Parkinson's Disease.
- Ronald Gordon McAleese. For services to charitable fundraising in Northern Ireland.
- Kathleen Ann, Mrs. McConaghie, Principal, Castleroe Primary School, Coleraine. For services to Education in Northern Ireland.
- Ms Alice McDaniel, Teacher, South Eastern Regional College. For services to Education in Northern Ireland.
- John Crossley McEwen, Veterinarian. For services to Equestrian Sport.
- Marisa, Mrs. McFarlane, Macmillan Paediatric Cancer Nurse Specialist, Belfast Health and Social Care Trust. For services to Nursing in Northern Ireland.
- Olwen Fiona, Mrs. McIlroy, Principal, Belmont Primary School, Belfast. For services to Education in Northern Ireland.
- Miss Sonia Dolores McIntosh, Head, HAIS Project Support. For parliamentary and voluntary service.
- Andrew Dunsmore McKechnie, Chief Superintendent, Metropolitan Police Service. For services to the Planning and Command of the London Operation for the London 2012 Olympic and Paralympic Games.
- Hugh McNaughtan, Area Chair, Strathclyde and Glasgow Children's Panels. For services to the Children's Hearings System.
- The Reverend Canon Samuel McVeigh. For services to the community in Limavady, Northern Ireland.
- John Mellor, Service Manager, CAFCASS. For services to Children, Young People and Families.
- Ms Judith Merrill, Artistic Producer, Travelling Light Theatre Company. For services to Children's Theatre.
- Ms Elizabeth Rosemary Michael, Co-Founder and Administrator, The Media Business Course. For services to Media Education and Training.
- Andrew Millar. For services to the Scout Movement and to the community in Northern Ireland.
- Mark Millar, Comic Book Writer and Film Producer. For services to Literature and Drama.
- David William Millington, Chair of Corporation, Salford City College. For services to Further Education.
- George Percival Mills, lately Senior Policy Officer, Equality and Human Rights Commission. For services to Race Relations within the Criminal Justice System.
- Anna Jane, Mrs. Mimms, Chief Executive, Broxtowe Education, Skills and Training, Nottingham. For services to Social Enterprise and to the community.
- Thomas Mitchell, Deputy Principal, Special Education Team, Department of Education, Northern Ireland Executive. For services to Children with Autism and voluntary service through Mencap.
- Victoria Lesley, Mrs. Mokes, Executive Officer, Child Support Agency. For services to the Child Support and voluntary services to Medical Counselling.
- John Mooney, Plaster Cast Technician, Monklands Hospital, Lanarkshire. For services to Orthopaedics.
- Dr. Fionna Patricia Moore, Medical Director, London Ambulance Service NHS Trust. For services to the NHS and to Emergency Services.
- Andrew Paul Morgan. For services to charitable giving in the UK.
- Jane Elizabeth, Mrs. Morgan. For services to Midwifery in the UK and to Maternity Service Provision in Shyira, Rwanda.
- Ms Maggie Morgan, Language Teacher, St. Pauls Nursery and Primary School, Brighton and Hove. For services to Education.
- Richard Michael Horton Morgan, Chief Engineer, BBC Sport. For services to Sports Broadcasting particularly the London 2012 Olympic and Paralympic Games.
- Major James Tyrrell Dermott MacCarthy-Morrogh, Higher Executive Officer equivalent, Ministry of Defence. For services to the Army Cadet Force.
- Pauline Mabel, Mrs. Mountain, Executive Chair Carers Partnership, Lincolnshire Carers and Young Carers Partnership. For services to Carers.
- Ms Sally Elizabeth Munday, Chief Executive, England Hockey and Chief Operating Officer, Great Britain Hockey. For services to Hockey.
- Eleanor Mary, Mrs. Munro of Foulis. For services to charity in Dingwall, Ross and Cromarty.
- William Henry Trevor Murphy, Senior Youth Officer, Belfast Education and Library Board. For services to Young People.
- Audrey, Mrs. Murray, Founding Director and Chair, Social Economy Network Northern Ireland. For services to the Social Economy Sector.
- Patricia, Mrs Murray, Director of Pharmacy, NHS Lothian. For services to Pharmacy.
- Teresa Marie, Mrs. Murray, Principal, St. Ronan's Primary School, Lisnaskea. For services to Education in Northern Ireland.
- Pamela Mary, Mrs. Neill, Chief Executive, Voluntary Service Lisburn. For services to the community and voluntary sector in Northern Ireland.
- Lloyd George Newby, Vice-Chairman, Derby West Indian Community Association. For services to Community Cohesion in Derbyshire.
- Ms Marita Yvonne Nibbs, Trustee and Home Visiting Volunteer, Home-Start Leicester. For services to Families.
- Arthur Warren-Nicholls. For services to the communities in Lostwithiel, Tywardreath and St. Blazey, Cornwall.
- Rajnesh Nirula, Associate Specialist Surgeon in Urology, Princess of Wales Hospital, Bridgend. For services to the NHS.
- John Ford Steeps Northcott, Chief Executive and Board Trustee, Northcott Foundation. For voluntary services to charitable giving in Hertfordshire and South London.
- Ms Jane Mary O'Brien, Assistant Director of Standards and Ethics, General Medical Council, London. For services to Medical Ethics.
- Philip O'Brien. For services to the Bowland Pennine Mountain Rescue Team in Preston, Lancashire.
- Terence O'Connor. For voluntary service to the community in Northampton.
- William Ogilvie. For services to the community, especially Sport, in South East Northumberland.
- Alice, Mrs. Oldfield, Foster Carer. For services to Looked After Children in Flintshire.
- David Oldfield, Foster Carer. For services to Looked After Children in Flintshire.
- John Francis Oldfield, Managing Director, Raynham Estates. For services to the Farming Industry and the Advancement of Farming Practice through Research.
- Graham Charles Olway, Chair, National Education Building Development Officers Group. For services to Education.
- David Stewart O'Neale. For services to the community in Bridgham, Norfolk.
- Philip Anthony Orford, Chief Executive, Forum of Private Businesses. For services to Small and Medium Enterprises.
- Ms Margaret Jane Orr, Chief Executive Officer, EMI Music Sound Foundation. For services to Music Education.
- Carol Gwenfron, Mrs. Owen. For services to the community in Llandeilo, Carmarthenshire.
- Stephen Paice, Manager E, H.M. Prison Featherstone. For services to H.M. Prison Service and to Prisoner Education.
- Antoinette, Mrs. Pardo, President, Friends of the Royal Marsden Hospital. For voluntary service to Healthcare.
- Zahur Ahmed Parkar, Founder, Network Staff Support Group, Home Office, London. For public service to Equality and Diversity.
- David Robert Partington, Chair, Greater Manchester Travel Training Forum. For services to Older People and People with Disabilities.
- Dr. Shyam Sunder Patiar, Consultant, Coleg Llandrillo Cymru. For services to Hospitality and Catering Vocational Education in North Wales.
- Brian Kevin Pearce, Superintendent, Metropolitan Police Service. For services to Operational Planning for the London 2012 Olympic and Paralympic Games.
- David Pearsall, J.P., lately Chair, Staffordshire Police Authority. For services to the community and the Police.
- Henry James Pearson, Consultant Colorectal and General Surgeon, Diana Princess of Wales Hospital, Grimsby, North East Lincolnshire. For services to the NHS.
- Heather Penelope, Mrs. Pegrum. For services to Riding for the Disabled Association through The Diamond Centre in Carshalton.
- Dorothy Carmen, Mrs. Penny. For voluntary service to the community of Ebbw Vale and District particularly People with Disabilities.
- Raymond George Penny, Custodian, Prime Minister's Office, 10 Downing Street. For services to the Prime Minister's Office and charitable services to Naomi House and Jack's Place in Hampshire.
- Elizabeth Mary, Mrs. Perrin. For voluntary service to Carers in North Wales.
- Michael Peters, Chief Executive Officer, UPL. For services to Industry in the North West and charity.
- Eric Wyn Phillips, Head of Music, Whitchurch High School and Conductor, Cardiff County and the Vale of Glamorgan Youth Orchestra. For services to Education and Music.
- Ruthie Eileen Jessica, Mrs. Phillips, lately NSPCC Divisional Vice-President, North West. For services to Children.
- Dr. Bryan John Philp. For services to Archaeology in Kent.
- Brian Pickup, J.P. For services to Health through Community First Responders and to the community in Rossendale, Lancashire.
- George Bernard Pincus, School Governor, Epsom College. For services to Education.
- Jashoda, Mrs. Pindoria, Integrated District Operations Manager, Work Services Directorate, Department for Work and Pensions. For services to Jobseekers and to the community in East London.
- Michael William Pitkeathly, Restorer, H.M.S. Courageous. For voluntary service to Naval Heritage.
- Robert Porter. Ministry of Defence. For services to Defence.
- Sharon Elizabeth, Mrs. Porter, Member, College of Agriculture, Food and Rural Enterprise Advisory Group. For services to Agriculture and Rural Development in Northern Ireland.
- Dermot David Poston, Councillor, London Borough of Greenwich. For public service in South East London.
- John Vernon Powell, Athletics Coach. For services to Athletics.
- Josephine, Mrs. Pownall, Senior Scientific Officer, Ministry of Defence. For services in support of Military Operations.
- Nigel Preece, Executive Officer, Operations, Department for Work and Pensions. For services to Welfare and voluntary service to the Homeless in Kidderminster.
- Dr. Gordon Stanley Clifford Park Wills Prestoungrange. For services to the community in Prestonpans, East Lothian.
- Ian Robert Pringle, School Governor, Ripon Grammar School and Outwood Academy, Ripon. For services to Education.
- Michael William Pritchard, Entrepreneur and Inventor, lifesaver Ultra-filtration Bottle. For services to Innovation and International Business.
- Norman Henry Proctor. For services to charity through Rotary International and to Business in the Community in Plymouth, Devon.
- Dr. Rosalyn Proops, Consultant Community Paediatrician, Norfolk. For services to Child Health and Protection.
- Helen Lesley, Mrs. Purchase. For services to the NSPCC, the Royal National Lifeboat Institution and to the community in Albrighton and Donington, Shropshire.
- Fiona, Mrs. Quirk, Operations Manager, Civil and Family Justice, Leeds Combined Court, H.M. Courts and Tribunals Service. For services to Law and Justice.
- Johanna Magreta, Mrs. Raffan, Founder, National Association for Able Children in Education. For services to Education.
- Richard Thomas Rainbow, lately Deputy Headteacher, Malorees Junior School, Brent. For services to Education.
- Carolyn Mary, Mrs. Rampton, lately Head of Office, Liberal Democrat Chief Whip in the Lords. For parliamentary service.
- Professor Mary Ratcliffe, Visiting Professor, University of York. For services to Chemistry.
- Councillor Felicity Marion Peel Rea, Member, Camden Council. For services to Local Government and to the community in London.
- Ms Dominique Rees, Deputy Director, British Group of the Inter-Parliamentary Union. For services to the British Group of the Inter-Parliamentary Union.
- Ian John Reilly, Senior Regional Director, West Midlands, Labour Party. For parliamentary and political services.
- John Rendle. For services to the community in Braunton, Devon.
- Ms Sheenagh Teresa Anita Reynolds, Assistant Director-Digital, DirectGov. For services to Digital Public Services.
- Ivy Theresia Angel, Mrs. Ridge, Ethnic Minorities Project Manager, Ballymena Inter Ethnic Forum. For services to Minority Ethnic Communities in Northern Ireland.
- Peter Antony Riding. For services to the community in Saffron Walden, Essex.
- Elizabeth Ann, Mrs. Ridley, Families and Business Support Manager, Hillsborough Team, Home Office. For services to the Hillsborough Independent Panel.
- Miss Pamela Rigby, Chairman, Mid-Cheshire Riding for the Disabled. For services to People with Disabilities.
- Ms Mary Rimington, Deputy Principal for Curriculum, City and Islington College. For services to Further Education.
- Councillor Evelyne Lavinia Robinson, Councillor, Ballymoney Borough Council. For services to Local Government and the community in Northern Ireland.
- David Howard Rogers. For services to the community in Stourbridge, West Midlands.
- Dr. Mary Clemitson Pattinson Groves Rowe. For services to the community in St. Albans, Hertfordshire and to charity in Sierra Leone.
- Ms Joanne Rule, Co-Chair, National Cancer Equality Initiative. For services to Promoting Health Equalities in Cancer Treatment.
- Miss Manjeet Sahota, Officer (Temporary), H.M. Revenue and Customs. For services to Diversity and People Development.
- Zaheeda, Mrs. Sakhawat, Higher Executive Officer, Operations, Department for Work and Pensions. For services to the DWP and for voluntary service to the community in Coventry.
- Karen Elizabeth, Mrs. Salmon, Nurse, Crosslinks. For services to Improving Health and Lives in Ethiopia.
- Ms Rosalind Elizabeth Adriana Savage. For services to Environmental Awareness and Fundraising.
- Celia Joan Mary, Mrs. Saywell. For voluntary service to the Association of WRENS (Women of the Royal Naval Services).
- Ms Anna Valerie Scher, Founder and Principal, Anna Scher Theatre. For services to Drama.
- Ms Carolyn Mary Taylor-Score, (Mrs. Matthews) Enhanced Practitioner, CAFCASS. For services to Children and Families.
- Agnes Elizabeth, Mrs. Scott, Counselling and Wellbeing Officer, Scottish Government. For public service.
- Grainne Mary, Mrs. Scott, Police Constable, Police Service of Northern Ireland. For services to Policing and the community in Northern Ireland.
- Muriel Findlay, Mrs. Searl, Co-ordinator, Dreamflight. For charitable services to Children and Young People with Illness and Disabilities.
- Nora Emily, Mrs. Setterfield. For services to People with Disabilities through the Thanet Disabled Riding Centre in Kent.
- Paul Charles Settle, General Secretary The Firefighters Memorial Trust. For public and charitable services.
- Ramaben, Mrs. Shah, Finance Officer and Administrative Support, Department for Business, Innovation and Skills. For services to Government Finance.
- Dr. Kaneez Shaid. For services to Young People and the community in East London.
- Ms Deborah Ann Sharples, Activity Development Officer, Anchor Housing. For services to Care and Housing.
- Captain Roderick Willis Shaw, Marine Surveyor, Maritime and Coastguard Agency. For services to Maritime Safety.
- Bushra Altaf, Mrs. Sheikh, Senior Probation Officer, West Yorkshire Probation Trust. For services to Probation Work including Ethnic Minority communities and for charitable service.
- Dinah Cathryn, Mrs. Shortt. For voluntary service through Diabetes UK.
- Miss Janet Shurmer. For services to Girlguiding and to the community in Reading, Berkshire.
- Sarah Jane, Mrs. Simpson, Founder Member, Institute of Conflict Management, London Borough of Richmond-upon-Thames. For services to Public Protection.
- Dr. Krishna Ballabh Prasad Singh, General Practitioner. For services to Healthcare in Lanarkshire.
- Keshav Singhal. For services to the Welsh and Indian community and for charitable services in Wales.
- Josephine Anna, Mrs. Skipp, Operational Delivery Team Leader, Agents Learning and Support Team, H.M. Revenue and Customs. For services to Taxpayers and to Bereavement Counselling.
- Miss Barbara Marshall Slider, Head of School and Deputy Headteacher, Shiremoor Primary School, Newcastle upon Tyne. For services to Education.
- Ms Pippa Small, Founder, Pippa Small Jewellery. For services to Ethical Jewellery Production and Charity.
- Alison Victoria, Mrs. Smith. For services to Sewing and Corsetry and to the community in North West Leicestershire.
- Isobel Elizabeth, Mrs. Smith, T.D. Chair, Melanoma Action and Support Scotland. For services to Cancer Awareness and Support.
- Maureen (Mo), Mrs. Smith. For services to the community in Putney and Roehampton, London.
- Andrew John Deighton Fitton Egerton-Smith, Founder and Trustee, East Anglian Air Ambulance. For services to Emergency Services in East Anglia.
- Ms Clare Smyth, Chef Patron, Restaurant Gordon Ramsay. For services to the Hospitality Industry.
- Christopher Gilbert Sneath, Chairman, Watersafe. For services to the Plumbing and Heating Industry.
- Ms Wendy Penelope Solesbury. For services to the British Red Cross and the London 2012 Olympic and Paralympic Games.
- Brian Sore. For services to Planning and Healthcare in Northern Ireland.
- Trevor Spence, Special Constable, Lancashire Constabulary. For voluntary service to Policing and to the community in Lancashire.
- Alan Lawrence Gordon-Stables, Governor, West Suffolk College. For services to Further Education.
- Margaret, Mrs. Stanhope, J.P., Member, Lichfield District Council. For services to Local Government and to the community in Lichfield, Staffordshire.
- Nicholas Staveley Stanley, Founder and Life President, Covkartsport. For services to Motorsport.
- Elizabeth, Mrs. Stanton, Police Constable, Cheshire Constabulary. For services to Policing.
- Ms Ruth Stark, Manager, Scottish Association of Social Workers. For services to Social Work in Scotland.
- Ms Sara Jennifer Stephens, Service Manager, CAFCASS. For services to Children, Young People and Families.
- Dr. Fiona Jane Stewart, Consultant in Medical Genetics, Queen's University Belfast. For services to Genetics in Northern Ireland.
- Professor Iain Stewart, Professor of Geoscience Communication, University of Plymouth. For services to Geology and Science Communication.
- Gordon Stuart Stockman. For services to West Country Illuminated Carnivals.
- Elizabeth, Mrs. Stow, National Officer, Society of Radiographers. For services to Partnership Working in NHS Scotland.
- Paul Strank. For services to charity and to the community in Wimbledon, South West London.
- Keith Stringer, Station Manager, Helston Fire Station, Cornwall Fire and Rescue Service. For services to the community and to Young People in Cornwall.
- Paula Margaret, Mrs. Suchy. For voluntary service to Visually Impaired People.
- Ian John Summers, lately Finance and Governance Adviser, National Assembly for Wales. For parliamentary service.
- William Swann, lately Director, Students, The Open University. For services to Higher Education.
- Derek Talbot. For services to Badminton.
- Vijay Kumar Tandon, Teacher, Botanic Primary School, Belfast. For services to Education in Northern Ireland.
- Elizabeth Mary, Mrs. Tatman, Founder and Chairman, Bolton Toy Library. For services to Children and Families.
- Denise Miriam, Mrs. Taylor, Team Leader, Remploy e-cycle. For services to People with Disabilities.
- Pauline, Mrs. Taylor, Director of Youth Work, UK Youth Charity. For services to Children and Young People.
- Thomas Alexander Taylor, Higher Executive Officer, Ministry of Defence. For services to Search and Rescue Operations.
- Maire Ahamed, Mrs. Tejani, Executive Officer, Department for Education. For services to Education and for charitable services through Yaarah Schools Charity in Ghana.
- Melanie, Mrs. Thomas, Macmillan Lymphoedema Clinical Specialist Physiotherapist for Swansea and South West Wales. For services to Patients with Cancer and Lymphoedema in Wales.
- Rachel Mary, Mrs. Thompson, Project and Development Officer, The Trails Trust. For services to Bridleway Creation.
- Stephen Roy Thompson. For services to Sport and Young People in Barking and Dagenham, East London.
- Charles Redvers Trippe. For services to Tennis.
- David Truesdale, Co-Founder, Leys Community Development Initiative, Oxford. For services to the community in Oxford.
- Ms Holly Lee Tucker, Co-Founder, Notonthehighstreet.com. For services to Small Businesses and Entrepreneurs.
- Avis, Mrs. Turner, Volunteer, Mencap Gateway Youth Club, Scarborough. For services to Young People.
- Elizabeth Anne, Mrs. Underwood. For public service in Northern Ireland.
- Ian Balfour Valentine, lately Chair, Board of Management, Ayr College. For services to Education and the community in Ayrshire.
- Janet, Mrs. Vaughan, Headteacher, Canvey Junior School, Essex. For services to Education.
- Einir Wynn, Mrs. Viney, Administrative Officer, Ministry of Defence. For services in support of Military Operations.
- Major Michael Gordon Vokes, T.D. For services to the Combined Cadet Force in Hampshire.
- Peter Ernest Waghorn, Chair, Welwyn Wheelers Cycling Club. For services to Cycling and Sailing in the South East.
- Linda Denise Jacquelynne, Mrs. Wainwright, Teacher, Slade Green Infants School. For services to Education and Children with Special Educational Needs.
- The Reverend Christopher James Anthony Walker, Regimental Padre. For services to Armed Forces Personnel.
- John Douglas Walker. For voluntary service to the Royal British Legion in Bunbury, Cheshire.
- David Wallace, Safety, Health, Environmental and Quality Director, Henry Brothers (Magherafelt) Limited. For services to Health and Safety in Northern Ireland.
- Ann, Mrs. Ward. For services to the Chichester Diocesan Association for Family Support Work, Sussex.
- David Haig Collum Ward (David Haig), Actor, Director and Playwright. For services to Drama.
- Miss Jane Ward, Founder and Director, Central Youth Theatre, Wolverhampton. For services to Drama and the community in Wolverhampton.
- Dr. Kathryn Patricia Ward, Consultant in Community Paediatrics, Airedale General Hospital, Keighley, West Yorkshire. For services to Child Protection.
- Meryl Suzanne, Mrs. Ward, Farmer and lately Member, Farm Animal Welfare Committee. For services to the improvement of Pig Welfare.
- Michael Ward, Curator, Grampian Transport Museum. For services to Tourism and Cultural Heritage in Aberdeenshire.
- Peter Rimmer Ward. For services to the Guild Wheel in Preston, Lancashire.
- Gary James Warke, Chief Executive, Hull College Group. For services to Education.
- Alexander Waters. For services to Sport in Northumberland.
- Robert Newell Watson. For services to the community in Braintree, Essex.
- Professor Evelyn Welch, lately Professor of Renaissance Studies, Queen Mary University of London. For services to Higher Education and the Creative Economy.
- Richard Andrew West, Founder, Inspired Services. For services to the Arts and Disabled People.
- Elizabeth Ann, Mrs. Weston, Curator, Mansfield Museum. For services to Heritage and the community.
- Keith Wilkinson. For services to Conservation in Harrogate.
- Ms Susan Wilkinson, lately Director of Policy, Museum, Libraries and Archives Council. For services to Learning in Museums.
- Clive Williams, Station Manager, St. Just Fire Station, Cornwall Fire and Rescue Service. For services to the Fire and Rescue Service and to the local community.
- Ms Emma-Louise Elizabeth Williams, Founder and Chief Executive, Matthew's Friends Charity. For services in support of Children with Epilepsy.
- James Leigh Roslin Williams, Chairman, Somerset Wildlife Trust's Otter Group, County of Somerset. For services to Otter Conservation in Somerset.
- William Robert Williams, Founder, WRW Group. For services to Skills and Training in the Construction Sector.
- Miss Sarah Williams, Equality and Diversity Rugby Manager, Football League. For services to Equality and Integration in Rugby.
- Leonard John Willoughby, Instructional Officer, H.M. Prison Kirkham. For services to H.M. Prison Service and Prisoners.
- Graham Peter Wilmer, Founder, the Lantern Project. For services to the Survivors and Victims of Abuse.
- Edward Brian Wilton, Director, Scottish Tartans Authority. For services to the Tartan Industry in Scotland.
- Ms Anna Maria Wojtowicz, Grade 7, Olympics and Legacy Team, Department for Communities and Local Government. For services to the London 2012 Olympic and Paralympic Games.
- Squadron Leader Colin Raymond Woodland, Royal Air Force (Retired). For voluntary service to the Soldiers' and Airmen's Scripture Readers Association.
- Charles Christopher Wraith. For public service and services to the community in Barnsley, South Yorkshire.
- Andrew Paul Wright, Higher Executive Officer, Ministry of Defence. For services to the Armed Forces.
- John William Wright, Volunteer, Crawley Neighbourhood Watch, Sussex. For services to Neighbourhood Watch and the community in Crawley.
- Dr Catherine Pamela Young, General Practitioner, Rasharkin. For services to Healthcare and to the community in Northern Ireland.

===== Crown Dependencies =====
====== Isle of Man ======
- David William Christian, J.P. For service to Local Government and to the community in Douglas.

====== Guernsey ======
- Dr. Susan Jane Vonda Wilson. For services to AIDS orphans in Tanzania.

====== Jersey ======
- Andrew James Le Seelleur. For services to the community, in particular as Founder and Chairman of Le Tournoi.
- Robert Winter Le Sueur. For services to the community.

=== British Empire Medal (BEM) ===
Military Division

- June Lenachan, – For 25 years long service in the British Army working with the Bomb Disposal Units in Didcot.

Civil Division

- Doreen Emily, Mrs. Adcock. For services to Swimming.
- Wendy Ann, Mrs. Allen. For services to the University of Birmingham and to the community in Halesowen.
- Pamela Marie, Mrs. Andrews, Honorary Chair, Alzheimer's Society, Mansfield and Ashfield Branch. For services to People Affected by Dementia and their Carers.
- Ian Thomas Burks Angus, Volunteer, Lancashire Constabulary. For services to Policing.
- Robert John Anthony. For services to Local Government and the community in Omagh.
- Rita Gillian, Mrs. Wilson-Apperson. For services to the community in Shortstown, Bedford.
- The Honourable Sonja Mary Arbuthnott. For services to the Arts and to charity in Perthshire.
- Wendy Eluned, Mrs. Atkinson. For services to the Women's Royal Voluntary Service and to the community in Marple, Greater Manchester.
- Philip Montague Ayers, J.P., Managing Director, Cuckmere Community Bus. For services to Transport.
- Leonard Bale. For services to the community in Lubenham, Leicestershire.
- Ms Sheila Ann Bamford, Executive Director, Horton Housing Association. For services to Social Inclusion in West Yorkshire.
- Jacquelyn Clare, Mrs. Bargman, Trustee and Clerk, Finchingfield Guildhall Trust. For services to English Heritage and to the community in Essex.
- Barbara, Mrs. Barnes, J.P. For voluntary and charitable services to the community in Dunbartonshire.
- Janet, Mrs. Bellamy, Honorary Secretary and Mill Manager, Moulton Windmill Project Ltd. For services to Conservation in Lincolnshire.
- James Gordon Beswick, Leader, Cheadle Hulme Community Youth Club. For services to Young People in Greater Manchester.
- Anne Penelope, Mrs. Bickmore. For charitable services through the abcfund in East Sussex.
- Keith Nigel Birkitt. For voluntary service to the Buxton Mountain Rescue Team.
- Fiona, Mrs. Birse, Chair, Elgin Youth Development Group and Director, Elgin Youth Cafe ́. For services to the community in Morayshire.
- Ms Mary Blackburn, Founder, Hobblers and Wobblers, Manchester. For services to the community in Greater Manchester.
- Walter Henderson Blair. For services to Music in Helensburgh, Argyll and Bute.
- Susan, Mrs. Blake. For services to Rambling and to the community in Dorchester, Dorset.
- Colin Bolton, Club President, Warton Cricket Club. For services to Cricket and the community.
- Lucille Elizabeth June, Mrs. Bonar. For services to Young People in County Antrim, especially through the Beaver Scouts.
- Arthur William Bonus. For services to the community in Rampton, Cambridgeshire.
- Sara Ella, Mrs. Bowers. For services to the community in Steyning, West Sussex.
- Ms Diane Rose Bradley. For services to the community in Worle, Somerset.
- Patricia Jane, Mrs. Branley, Administrative Officer, Ministry of Defence. For public and charitable services especially to the Macmillan Trust and Military Veterans.
- Norah Sylvia, Mrs. Brennan, Irish Dance Teacher. For services to Dance.
- Paul Henry Brett, Senior Officer, H.M. Prison Northumberland. For services to H.M. Prison Service.
- Shirley Ann, Mrs. Brookes. For services to charitable giving in Telford, Shropshire.
- Kathleen, Mrs. Brough, Counter Assistant, Binley Post Office, Coventry. For services to the Postal Service and to the community in Binley.
- Robert John Bryant, Founder and Chair, Let's Go Stroke Club, Cheshire. For services to Stroke Survivors.
- Patricia, Mrs. Bulmer, Founder and Leader, Elim Toddler Group, Sunderland. For services to Education.
- Sheila Joy, Mrs. Bunt, Founder, Bath All Comers Orchestra. For services to Music and the community.
- Ian Burdekin. For services to charitable giving in East Yorkshire.
- Agnes, Mrs. Burgoyne, Manager, Rosebery Centre, Livingston. For services to Older People.
- Stanley Philip James Burton, Athletics Timekeeper. For services to Athletics.
- Jennifer, Mrs. Butler, lately Teaching Assistant, Richard Whittington Primary School, Bishops Stortford. For services to Education in Hertfordshire.
- Michael Talbot-Butler. For services to Cricket Administration in Cheshire.
- Elizabeth Joan, Mrs. Calver, Nurse and Caregiver, Pramacare Home Care Services. For services to Older People.
- Margaret Ann, Mrs. Campbell, Sub Postmistress, Vatersay, Western Isles. For services to the Postal Service and the community in Vatersay.
- Sylvia, Mrs. Cape, Volunteer, North East Prisons After Care Service, H.M. Prison Northumberland. For services to Prisoners and their Families.
- June Kathleen, Mrs. Carr, Treasurer and Fundraiser, Hythe Hospital League of Friends. For charitable services.
- Frank Bernard James Cassidy, lately Principal, St. Louis Grammar School, Ballymena. For services to Community Cohesion through Ballymena Learning Together.
- William George Chant. For services to the community in Guildford, Surrey.
- Janice Eileen, Mrs. Chapman, Brownie and Guide Leader, Groombridge Guide Group. For services to Young People in Kent.
- Lawrence Richard Chapman, Youth Club Leader. For services to Young People in Castlethorpe, Buckinghamshire.
- Michele Jean, Mrs. Chown, School Cleaner, St. Bartholomews School, Somerset. For services to Education.
- Gordon Hamlin Chudley. For services to the community in Sparkwell, Devon.
- Raymond Clark. For services to Volunteering and charitable giving in the UK.
- Major William Thomas Clarke. For services to the community especially Elderly People in Eastleigh, Hampshire.
- Una, Mrs. Cleminson, T.D. For voluntary service to the Royal British Legion in Buckinghamshire.
- Maurice Hugh George Cole. For services to the community in Codford, Wiltshire.
- Charles Richard Cooper. For voluntary service to the Army Cadet Force in Walton on Thames, Surrey.
- Stanley Cecil Coorsh, Chair, Sandymount Regeneration Project. For services to the community in Glasgow.
- Lyn, Mrs. Costelloe, Chief Executive Officer, Little Red Bus (HDCT). For services to Community Transport in North Yorkshire.
- Ronald William James Eamon Coulter, Chair, Northern Ireland Vintage Ploughing Association. For services to Agriculture and the Rural community in Northern Ireland.
- Angela Marilyn, Mrs. Cox. For voluntary service to people affected by Breast Cancer in Hertfordshire.
- John Charles Cox. For services to the community in Hatherleigh, Newport, South Wales.
- Pauline, Mrs. Crockard, Instructional Officer, Ministry of Defence. For services to Military Families and the community in Lisburn.
- Gloria Olga, Mrs. Crossley. For voluntary service to Conservation in Cockayne Hatley, Bedfordshire.
- Isobel Ann, Mrs. Dale, Chairman, Kemp Hospice, Kidderminster. For services to Hospice Care.
- Lindsay Margaret, Mrs. Daly, Administrative Officer, Ministry of Defence. For services to the Defence community in New Delhi.
- Hal Joseph Davenport. For voluntary service to the RAF Association and to the community in Halesowen and Cradley Heath, West Midlands.
- Robert Alexander Davidson. For services to the community in Duffus, Morayshire.
- Christopher Henry Davies. For services to the community in Edinburgh.
- Rosemary Erma, Mrs. Davies. For services to the community in Felingwm-uchaf, Carmarthenshire.
- Elizabeth, Mrs. Davis, lately Classroom Assistant, Foyle View Special School. For services to Children and Young People in Londonderry.
- James Andrew Davis. For services to the community in Newry and Mourne, Northern Ireland.
- Roger Edward Denny. For charitable services in Bushmills, County Antrim.
- Valerie Anne, Mrs. Denny. For charitable services in Bushmills, County Antrim.
- Miss Sally Ann Derry. For services to The Solihull Bereavement Counselling Service and to the community in Solihull, West Midlands.
- Peter Edward Desborough, Finance Officer, Department for Business, Innovation and Skills. For services to Regional Economic Policy and to the community in Hertfordshire.
- The Reverend (Margaret) Elspeth Desmond. For services to the community in Filton, Bristol.
- Ingrid Garrioch, Mrs. Deuling, Founder Member, Specialist Section (Scotland) Housing, Scottish College of Occupational Therapists. For services to Independent Living in Clackmannanshire.
- Margaret, Mrs. Diamond, Senior Care Worker, Jericho House. For services to Rehabilitation Centres in the West of Scotland.
- Frederick Albert Dickson. For services to the community in Armagh, Northern Ireland.
- William Anderson Dodds, Volunteer Groundsman, Sudbury Cricket Club. For services to Cricket and the community.
- Lynne Dianne, Mrs. Doodney. For services to the Scouts and to the community in Sherborne, Dorset.
- Miss Esme Felicite Duncan. For services to the Scripture Union and to charity in Caithness, Highland Region.
- Anthony David Dutton. For services to the community in Wombwell, South Yorkshire.
- Miss Jacqueline Edinburgh. For services to the Solihull Lifesaving Club, West Midlands.
- Ellen Davidson, Mrs. Edward. For services to the community in East Dunbartonshire.
- Joan Mary, Mrs. Edwards, Voluntary Leader, Clwb y Berwyn, Corwen. For services to Older People.
- Miss Pamela Vera Eldridge, Independent Member on Fostering Panels, Hertfordshire Social Services. For services to Children and Families.
- John Robert Elliott. For services to Young People and to the community in South Oxhey, Hertfordshire.
- Margaret Elaine, Mrs. Elliott. For services to The Mission to Seamen Charity and to the community in Fowey, Cornwall.
- Neil Alexander Ellis, Manager, Boomerang Community Centre. For services to the community in Stobswell, Dundee.
- Barbara, Mrs. Elster, Vice President, Diabetes UK, Essex. For services to People Affected by Diabetes.
- Eric Douglas Emery, Volunteer Car Driver, West Midlands Ambulance Service NHS Trust. For services to Health.
- John Esler, Member, Causeway Cardiac Support Group. For services to Healthcare in Northern Ireland.
- Blodwen, Mrs. Espley, Volunteer, Western Health and Social Care Trust. For voluntary service to Healthcare in Northern Ireland.
- Miss Pamela Farley, Founder and Chair, St. Albans Woodland Trust Support Group. For services to the community in Hertfordshire.
- Dorothy, Mrs. Farrington, Councillor, Borough of Rossendale. For services to the community in Goodshaw.
- Janet Margaret, Mrs. Felton, School Crossing Patrol Officer. For services to Road Safety and to the community in Colchester, Essex.
- Christine Leslie, Mrs. Fitton, J.P. For services to Scouting and to the Magistracy in Blackpool, Lancashire.
- John Malcolm Stuart Fletcher. For voluntary service to the Sea Cadet Corps and the community in Walton-on- the-Naze.
- Jennifer Elsebeth, Mrs. Di Folco. For services to Art Education in Scotland.
- Gerald John Foley. For services to Rugby in Bristol. Trevor Swan Ford. For services to Special Needs Education.
- Avis Archdale, Mrs. Freeman. For services to the communities in Leigh and Wigan, Greater Manchester.
- Angela Pauline Lysbeth, Mrs. Gamble. For services to Scouting and to the community in West Mersea, Essex.
- Marjorie Linda, Mrs. Games. For services to the community in Powys.
- Elizabeth Mary, Mrs. Gammon. For services to the community in Hanwell, West London.
- Enid Margaret, Mrs. Gaved, Fundraiser, Arthritis Research UK. For services to People with Arthritis.
- Duncan McLennan Glass, Adviser, Tay Ghillies Association. For voluntary service to Salmon Conservation on the River Tay.
- Judith Pauline, Mrs. Glossop, Fundraiser, Marie Curie, Lincolnshire. For services to People with Cancer.
- Michael Stanley Gooderson, J.P., Group Scout Leader, 17th Holborn Scouts and lately Chairman, Great Ormond Street Hospital Scout and Guide Project. For services to Young People and to the community.
- Cyril Oliver Goulbourne. For voluntary service to the Royal British Legion in Formby, Merseyside.
- Arthur Green, Chairman, 3rd Doncaster Scout Group Executive Committee. For services to Young People and the community in Doncaster.
- Richard John Green, Ship's Master, Rathlin Island Ferry Ltd. For services to the community in County Antrim.
- Alan Gregory, Police Community Support Officer, Skerton, Lancaster. For voluntary service to Policing and to the community in Lancashire.
- Christine, Mrs. Gunning. For voluntary service to the British Federation of Festivals.
- Ms Anisa Haghdadi, Social Entrepreneur. For services to Education and Young People.
- Malcolm Hall Haigh. For services to the community in Batley, West Yorkshire.
- Mark Anthony Hall, Grounds Manager, Harper Adams University College. For services to Land-Based Higher Education and to the National Vegetable Society.
- Carole Margaret, Mrs. Halliday. For services to Young People and the community of Mevagissey, Cornwall.
- Patricia Ann, Mrs. Hamilton. For services to the communities in Anstey, Meesden and Brent Pelham, Hertfordshire.
- Vivienne, Mrs. Hammer. For voluntary service to the Bomber Command Association.
- Mary Dorothy, Mrs. Hansell. For services to the community through the St. Luke's Luncheon Club in Norwich, Norfolk.
- Roy Ernest Hansell. For services to the community through the St. Luke's Luncheon Club in Norwich, Norfolk.
- James Ronald Douglas Harkness, lately Building Supervisor, Arvalee School and Resource Centre. For services to Education in Northern Ireland.
- Brian Wyn Harries. For services to the Brynamman Hall and the community in Brynamman, Carmarthenshire.
- Jeannette Allegra, Mrs. Harrison. For voluntary service to the British Red Cross on Humberside.
- Lionel Harrison, Club Treasurer, Club Secretary and Principal Fundraiser, Blagdon Cricket Club. For services to Cricket and the community.
- Moreen Lorraine, Mrs. Hatrick. For voluntary service to the community in Northern Ireland.
- Martin Thomas Hay. For voluntary service to SSAFA in Lincolnshire.
- Peter Healey, J.P., Patron, Blue Coat School Academy, Wavertree, Liverpool. For services to Education.
- Eunice, Mrs. Hemingway, Trade Unionist. For services to Trade Unionism and to the community in Wakefield, West Yorkshire through the Samaritans.
- Millicent Angus, Mrs. Herd, Founder, Sair Heidies. For services to Music and Charity in North East Scotland.
- Paul Herman, Volunteer, Leonard Cheshire Disability. For services to the community in London.
- Kenneth Hindle, President, Burnham on Sea University of the Third Age and former Chair, Burnham and Highbridge Community Association. For services to Adult Education.
- Edward Louis Glyn Hoare, Founder and Musical Director Wadhurst Brass Band. For services to Music.
- Thomas Daniel Hodgson. For services to Rugby.
- Mabel Audrey, Mrs. Hooper. For services to the community in Motcombe, Dorset.
- Councillor Winifred Margaret Howell. For services to Local Government and Housing in Torfaen.
- Stephanie Mary, Mrs. Hryschko, Volunteer, Kiveton Park and Wales Development Trust. For services to the community.
- Gillian Mary, Mrs. Hucker. For services to the community in South Hams, Devon.
- Miss Jane Hughes. For services to the Chinese community in Northern Ireland.
- Jean Kathleen, Mrs. Hughes. For services to the community through Keep Fit and to charity in Kingswinford, West Midlands.
- Ettrick Hughes Humphreys, Volunteer, Leicestershire and Rutland Probation Trust. For services to the community.
- Alexander Henderson Jack. For services to the Scouting Movement in Scotland.
- Mary Eirlys Anne, Mrs. Jackson. For services to the community in Llandovery, Carmarthenshire.
- Donald Thomas Jacques. For services to the community and to charity in Nuneaton, Warwickshire.
- Mark Anthony Jastrzebski, Community Activist. For services to the community in Birmingham.
- Gwyneth, Mrs. Jeffreys. For charitable services in Cardiff.
- Hywel Wyn Jeffreys. For charitable services in Cardiff.
- Jennifer, Mrs. Jester. For services to the Citizens' Advice Bureau, Wyre Forest.
- Christine Iere Ann, Mrs. Johnston. For voluntary services to the London Wetland Centre, Marie Curie Cancer Care and the Royal British Legion Poppy Appeal.
- Susan Jane, Mrs. Johnston, lately Head of Campus Services, University of York. For services to Higher Education.
- Douglas Kensey Jones, Founder and President, Porthcawl University of the Third Age. For voluntary service to Adult Education.
- Santosh, Mrs. Kanwar, Manager, Southall Day Centre, Middlesex. For services to the community.
- Brian Kell, Founder and Organiser, The Straw Bear Festival. For services to Music and the community in Whittlesey, Cambridgeshire.
- Margaret, Mrs. Kells, lately Cleaner, Lisnaskea Public Library. For services to the community in Lisnaskea, Northern Ireland.
- Brian Alfred Kempster, Greenkeeper, Gidea Park Bowls Club. For services to Bowls.
- Nicholas Vincent Kendall, Assistant Manager of Building Services, The British Museum. For services to the British Museum Collections.
- Margaret Andree, Mrs. Kenworthy. For services to the community in Donington, Lincolnshire.
- David Clifford John Kingsnorth, Community Ranger, Forestry Commission. For services to Forestry and voluntary service through Suffolk Special Constabulary.
- Dorothy, Mrs. Kirk. For services to the communities in Gunnislake, Cornwall and West Devon.
- Sheila May, Mrs. Labhart. For services to Dance and charity.
- Eric Lamb. For charitable community services in Newcastle upon Tyne.
- Ian William Landles. For services to the community in Hawick, Scottish Borders.
- Muriel Audrey, Mrs. Lanman. For services to charity in Tenbury Wells, Worcestershire.
- Deborah, Mrs. Lawson, Higher Executive Officer, Information System Directorate, Driver and Vehicle Licensing Agency. For services to DVLA and voluntary service through the Samaritans.
- Christine, Mrs. Leaves, Family and Friends Care Support Group Consultant, Family Rights Group and Leader, Second Time Around Support Group, Peterborough. For services to Children and Families.
- Aileen, Mrs. Leckey, lately School Crossing Patrol Officer, Saintfield, County Down. For services to Education in Northern Ireland.
- Graham Maurice Leeke. For services to the community in Bishop's Tachbrook, Warwickshire.
- Barbara, Mrs. Letchford, lately Branch and Regional Representative, National Association of Head Teachers, South East Region. For services to Education.
- James Lettice. For services to Silloth Rugby Club.
- Ivor William Lippett. For services to the community in Penylan, Cardiff and to the Miskin Mill Scout Village, Rhondda Cynon Taff.
- Catherine, Mrs. Longmore, Shop Owner. For services to the Economy and to the community in Rothes, Morayshire.
- Ms Anna Lovell. For services to the community in West Dorset.
- Brenda Annie, Mrs. Mackfall, Nursing Home Entertainer, Yorkshire. For services to Older People.
- Florence, Mrs. Mann. For voluntary service to St. John Ambulance in Dereham, Norfolk.
- John David Marks. For services to St. James Church, Cooling and to Ecclesiastical Heritage in Kent.
- Margaret Amy, Mrs. Marshall. For services to the communities in Forest Green and Nailsworth, Gloucestershire.
- John Mason. For services to the community in Cambridgeshire through Community Action Peterborough.
- Mavis Priscilla, Mrs. Mason. For services to the community in Charnwood, Leicestershire.
- Andrew McCartney. For services to the community in Oldmeldrum, Aberdeenshire.
- Georgina, Mrs. McClintock, Co-founder, Sion Mills Community Association. For services to the community in Sion Mills, Strabane, Northern Ireland.
- Mary Ellen, Mrs. McCloy. For voluntary and charitable services to the community in Ballygowan, County Down.
- Miss Dorothy Sheila McIlhagga, Founder, The Oldershaw Singers. For services to Music and the community.
- Winifred, Mrs. McLoughlin. For services to the community in Glasshoughton, West Yorkshire.
- Susan, Mrs. Miles. For services to the community in Cawood, North Yorkshire.
- Patricia Susan, Mrs. Millar, Committee Member, Care Inspectorate's Involving People Group. For services to the Regulation of Care.
- Elinor Agnes, Mrs. Milne. For services to the Seagull Trust and the community in Falkirk.
- Barry James Miskin. For services to the community in Thurlton, Norfolk.
- Rosemary Joan, Mrs. Mitchell. For services to the community in East Cowes, Isle of Wight.
- Nasreen Akhter, Mrs. Mohammed, Diversity Adviser, Tayside Police. For services to the advancement of Diversity and Equality in the Scottish Police Force.
- Jane, Mrs. Moreland, Honorary Secretary, Brittle Bone Society. For services to People Affected by Brittle Bones. (To be dated 2 June 2013).
- Enid Sheila, Mrs. Morgan. For voluntary and charitable services to the community in Mochdre, Powys.
- Robert John Morris, Watch Commander, Redditch Fire Station. For services to the community in Worcestershire.
- Terence James Cecil Arthur Moseley, Past President Irish Astronomical Association. For services to Astronomy Education.
- Ms Mary Catherine Muldoon. For voluntary and charitable services to the community in Fermanagh.
- Ann, Mrs. Murdoch, Service Delivery Manager, Buchanan Bus Station. For services to Transport in the West of Scotland.
- Judith Mary, Mrs. Muston. For voluntary service to SSAFA and to the community in Gwynedd.
- Wayne Natzel, Chair, Eyres Monsel Community Association. For services to the community in Leicester.
- Jessie Miriam, Mrs. Nesbitt. For services to the community in Greenisland, Northern Ireland.
- Joyce Paris, Mrs. Nicholls. For services to Keep Fit in Essex.
- Raymond Peter Michael Oakley. For services to Education and to Cricket in Southampton, Hampshire.
- Roger Parkinson, Volunteer, Thornes Park, Woodland Trust. For services to the Environment and community in Wakefield.
- Geoffrey Mark Parmiter. For services to Sheen Lions Football Club and to the community in East Sheen, South West London.
- Mary Elizabeth, Mrs. Parry. For services to the Economy and to the community in Levenmouth, Fife.
- Dr Fiona Paterson. For services to People with Dementia and their Families in Ayrshire.
- John Thomas Patton. For voluntary and charitable services to Action Cancer in Northern Ireland.
- Sarah, Mrs. Peel, Operational Support Grade, H.M. Prison Full Sutton. For services to the H.M. Prison Service and Prison Visitors.
- Patricia Beryl, Mrs. Perryman, Chair, Allhallows Museum. For services to the Heritage of Lace-Making.
- Andrew Benjamin Phillips. For services to History and Heritage in Colchester.
- Roy John Pidgeon. For voluntary service to the Air Training Corps in Hampshire and the Isle of Wight.
- David John Platt. For services to the community in Horncastle, Lincolnshire.
- Diana Mary, Mrs. Porter, Chair, North Cotswold RNLI. For charitable services to Maritime Safety.
- Jan Ker, Mrs. Prebble, President, Blue Dolphin Square Tenants' Association. For services to the community in Pimlico, London.
- Kathleen, Mrs. Prescott. For services to the community in Farnworth, Bolton.
- Patricia Mary, Mrs. Preston. For voluntary service to Community Rural Transport in Denbighshire.
- Maureen Henrietta, Mrs. Pruskin, Voluntary Fundraiser, Milton Keynes Hospital. For charitable services to the community.
- John Neville Pryke. For services to Sport, charity and to the community in Fordham, Cambridgeshire.
- Dean Gratton Pursell. For voluntary service to SSAFA in London.
- John Bone Rankin. For services to the community in Fraserburgh, Aberdeenshire.
- Anne Mary, Mrs. Read. For services to the Community Association of New Eltham, South East London.
- Hilary Kathleen, Mrs. Reid. For services to the community in Great Hampden, Buckinghamshire.
- Julia Elizabeth, Mrs. Rennie, Proprietor, Puddle Ducks Nursery, Raglan, Monmouthshire. For services to Early Years Provision and for charitable services in Monmouthshire, South Wales.
- Paul Julian Rey, Grounds Convenor, Helensburgh Cricket and Rugby Football Club. For services to Sport and Charity.
- June Lillian, Mrs. Rixson, School Crossing Officer. For services to Education and to the community in the London Borough of Croydon.
- Howel Hughes Roberts. For voluntary and charitable services in Gwynedd.
- Miss Beatrice McAlpine Robertson. For services to the Church and to the community in Helensburgh, Argyll and Bute.
- Eileen Mary, Mrs. Rogerson. For services to the community in Kirkwhelpington, Northumberland.
- Vaughan Rosbotham, Captain, 115th Belfast Company Boys' Brigade St. Columba's Church. For services to Young People in Northern Ireland.
- Malcolm Gordon Rose, Fundraiser and Chair, Friends of Solihull Hospital. For charitable services to Patient Care.
- Olive Patricia, Mrs. Rose, Fundraiser, Friends of Solihull Hospital. For charitable services to Patient Care.
- Christine Margaret, Mrs. Rostron, Chair of Governors, Town Green Primary School, Aughton, Lancashire. For services to Education.
- Geoffrey Rowe, Co-Founder, Leicester Comedy Festival. For services to the Arts and the City of Leicester.
- Mervyn Rowe, lately Captain, 1st Pettigo Boys' Brigade and Committee Member, Pettigo Cross Community Development Association. For services to the community in Northern Ireland.
- Alyson, Mrs. Ruddick, Volunteer Carer. For services to Carers and People with Special Needs in Islington.
- John Robert Rudkin, Youth Worker, Tangmere Youth Club, Chichester. For services to Young People.
- Michael Oliver Sackett. For services to Citizens' Advice Bureau, Mendip.
- Miss Lynette Gay Sargent. For services to the community in Shipbourne, Kent.
- James Andrew Scott, Founder Member and Chair, Gillygooley Youth and Community Development Association. For services to Young People and the community in Gillygooley, Northern Ireland.
- David Robin Scott. For services to Music in Newcastle upon Tyne.
- Ian Edward Albert Scott. For services to the community in Barnstaple, Devon.
- Mary, Mrs. Seal. For services to the community in Bingley, West Yorkshire.
- Anne Elizabeth, Mrs. Seymour. For services to the community in Dormansland, Surrey.
- Suzanne, Mrs. Shepherd. For services to the community and charity in Northern Ireland.
- Jacqueline Mary, Mrs. Sherfield, Founder, Dorchester Social Stroke Club. For services to Stroke Patients in Dorset.
- Dr Jean May Shields, Historian. For services to Local History in North Tawton, Devon.
- Martha Jane, Mrs. Shields. For voluntary service to the community in Strabane, Northern Ireland.
- Pamela Ann, Mrs. Simpson, lately Girls' Brigade Captain, 1st Colchester Group and Volunteer, Bishop William Ward Church of England Primary School. For services to Children and Young People.
- Peter Singleton. For service to the Crown and voluntary service to the community in Cambridgeshire.
- Kenneth Charles Slee, Sub Postmaster, Heworth Post Office, York. For services to the Postal Service and to the community in Heworth.
- Donald Clinton-Smith. For services to the community in Market Harborough, Leicestershire.
- Doreen Rita, Mrs. Clinton-Smith. For services to the community in Market Harborough, Leicestershire.
- Dickon Snell. For services to the Children's Society and to the community in Wokingham, Berkshire.
- Heiki Soova, Table Tennis Coach. For services to Table Tennis.
- Glenda Irene, Mrs. Stephens. For services to Hockey and to the community in Thurrock, Essex.
- Margaret Ethnie, Mrs. Stuart. For services to Priscilla Bacon Lodge and to the community in Norwich, Norfolk.
- Rabindra-nauth Sukhdeo, Owner and Manager, Albert Road Recreation Ground. For services to Sport and the community in Haringey.
- Olive, Mrs. Sutton, Founder, the Sheaf Singers. For services to Music and charitable fundraising.
- Jennifer Ann, Mrs. Taylor. For services to the community in Maidenhead, Berkshire and to Education in Kenya through the Kazi Mingi Foundation.
- Lesley, Mrs. Taylor, Director, Conservatives Abroad. For public and political service.
- Pauline (Polly), Mrs. Taylor, Co-Founder, Pickering Cancer Drop-In Centre. For voluntary service to People in Kent Affected by Cancer.
- Robert Taylor. For services to the community in Wingate, County Durham.
- Caryl, Mrs. Thomas. For services to the Cardris Dance Club, Resolven, Neath Port Talbot and to charity.
- Janet, Mrs. Thomas. For services to the community in Llanfairfechan, Conwy.
- Richard Thomas Arthur Todd, Head Gardener, Anglesey Abbey. For services to the National Trust and to National Heritage in Cambridgeshire.
- Frank Stanley Tolley, Volunteer, Imperial War Museum North. For services to Museums and the community.
- George Toombs. For services to Young People in Antrim through the Boys' Brigade and the Scout Association.
- Caroline Mary, Mrs. Townsend. For services to charitable Fundraising.
- Ms Paula Treharne, Executive Officer, Central Capture Unit, Driver and Vehicle Licensing Agency. For public service and services to the community in Pantyffynnon.
- John Alfred Upton. For voluntary service to St. John Ambulance in Staffordshire.
- Pamela Jane, Mrs. Valler, Youth Worker and Treasurer, Rogate Village Youth Club. For services to Young People.
- Miss Patricia Marjory Veitch. For services to the community in Drumnadrochit, Inverness-shire.
- Kevin John Walker, Paramedic, London Ambulance Service. For services to Emergency Healthcare and the community in Essex.
- Rebecca Jane, Mrs. Wall. For services to the communities in Eaton Bishop and Ruckhall, Herefordshire.
- Terence Edward Walton. For voluntary service to St. John Ambulance in London.
- Beryl, Mrs. Warner. For charitable services in North Wales.
- Barbara, Mrs. Warren. For voluntary service to Oxfam, Ringwood, Hampshire.
- Ms Christine Mary Wells. For services to Music and to the community in Hambleden, Buckinghamshire.
- Anna May, Mrs. Wharry. For services to the community in Carnlough, Northern Ireland.
- Frederick Arthur Wharton. For services to Amateur Drama in the North East.
- Sonia Jill (Jillie), Mrs. Wheeler. For services to charity and to the community in the Isle of Wight.
- Carolyn Tracy (Crin), Mrs. Whelan, Early Support Co- ordinator, Penzance and Newlyn Children's Centre. For services to Children and Families.
- Christine Anne, Mrs. White. For voluntary service through Cancercareline and service to the community in Monmouthshire.
- Gwen, Mrs. White. For services to Scouting and to the community in Ainsworth, Greater Manchester.
- Noel White. For services to Football.
- Ms Louise Alexandra Whiten. For voluntary service to the British Armed Forces.
- The Reverend Paul Wilcock, Force Chaplain, West Yorkshire Police. For services to Policing.
- Jacqueline Gail, Mrs. Williams, Co-founder, Caerwent Community Centre. For services to the community in Caerwent, Monmouthshire.
- Ms Angela Wilson. For public service and voluntary service through the Lambeth Youth Offending Programme.
- Ms Harriet Coleman Woakes, Secretary, North Pembrokeshire Transport Forum. For services to Transport.
- Michael Stefan Wood. For services to Music in Burgess Hill, West Sussex.
- Norman Harry Wood. For voluntary service to the British Red Cross Society.
- Paul James Woodham. For voluntary service to Deafblind People through the Sense Holiday Programme.
- Doris Mary, Mrs. Woollacott. For services to the community in Ashburton, Devon.
- Andrew Wright, School Police Officer and Project Leader, Nowt2do Scheme. For services to Children and Young People in Greater Manchester.
- Frank Anthony Wright. For services to charity and to the community in Mirfield, West Yorkshire.
- Iris Honor, Mrs. Wright, Marie Curie Nurse and Ambassador, Marie Curie Cancer Care. For services to End of Life Care.
- Richard Charles Yeoman, Volunteer, Brownsea Island. For services to National Heritage and to the community in Poole, Dorset.
- Sandra Joan, Mrs. Yeoman, Volunteer, Brownsea Island. For services to National Heritage and the community in Poole, Dorset.

=== Royal Red Cross ===
==== Associates (ARRC) ====
- Squadron Leader Lorraine Howard Lawton – Princess Mary's Royal Air Force Nursing Service, Royal Auxiliary Air Force
- Major Sharon Mary Beatty – Queen Alexandra's Royal Army Nursing Corps

=== Queen's Police Medal (QPM) ===
- James Bingham – Sergeant, Police Service of Northern Ireland.
- Paul Andrew Campbell – Sergeant, Hampshire Constabulary
- Dionne Marie Collins – Assistant Chief Constable, Derbyshire Police.
- Campbell Corrigan – lately Temporary Chief Constable, Strathclyde Police.
- Justine Curran – lately Chief Constable, Tayside Police.
- Gary Davison – Detective Inspector, West Midlands Police.
- John Feavyour – Deputy Chief Constable, Cambridgeshire Constabulary.
- Peter John Goodman – Deputy Chief Constable, Derbyshire Police.
- Katherine Frances Inge Govier – Assistant Chief Constable, Bedfordshire Police.
- William Harper – Detective Sergeant, Police Service of Northern Ireland.
- John Hockley – Constable, Surrey Police.
- Mark Jennings – lately Sergeant, Humberside Police.
- Steven Jones – Inspector, North Wales Police.
- John Long – Assistant Chief Constable, Avon and Somerset Constabulary.
- Stephen Martin – Chief Superintendent, Police Service of Northern Ireland.
- Andrew Murphy – Sergeant Avon and Somerset Constabulary.
- Colette Francesca Paul – Deputy Chief Constable, South Wales Police.
- Ian Shannon – Deputy Chief Constable, North Wales Police.
- Stephen John Thompson – Temporary Chief Inspector, Staffordshire Police.
- Michael Tisi – Sergeant, Metropolitan Police Service.
- Stephen John Tunmore – Constable, Northumbria Police.
- John Andrew Ward – Assistant Chief Constable, Merseyside Police.
- John Francis Wolstenholme – Detective Sergeant, British Transport Police.

=== Queen's Fire Service Medal (QFSM) ===
- Stewart Edgar – lately Chief Fire Officer, Highlands and Islands Fire and Rescue Service.
- Martyn Emberson – Chief Fire Officer, Northamptonshire Fire and Rescue Service.
- Elizabeth Hampson – Group Manager, North Yorkshire Fire and Rescue Service.
- Martin Joyce – Assistant Group Commander, Northern Ireland Fire and Rescue Service.
- Anthony (Tony) Linney – Retained Watch Manager, Scottish Fire and Rescue Service (Fife Area).
- Paul Souden – Retained Crew Manager, Scottish Fire and Rescue Service (Strathclyde Area).
- Roy Wilsher OBE – Chief Fire Officer, Hertfordshire Fire and Rescue Service.

=== Queen's Ambulance Service Medal (QAM) ===
- David Edward James Bull – Education and Command Training Lead, National Ambulance Resilience Unit, South East Coast Ambulance Service NHS Trust.
- Roland Chesney – Resilience Manager, East of England Ambulance Service NHS Trust.
- Daren Mochrie – Director of Service Delivery, Scottish Ambulance Service.
- William Newton – Planning Officer, Northern Ireland Ambulance Service.

=== Queen's Volunteer Reserves Medal (QVRM) ===
- Colonel Steven Cheetham MBE TD – Late of the Corps of Royal Engineers Territorial Army
- Lieutenant Colonel Jacqueline Anne Allan TD – Royal Corps of Signals Territorial Army
- Lieutenant Colonel David Andrew Jones MBE – Corps of Royal Engineers Territorial Army
- Wing Commander Marie-Noelle Francesca Orzel OBE – Princess Mary's Royal Air Force Nursing Service Royal Auxiliary Air Force
- Major Paul John Johnson – The Mercian Regiment Territorial Army
- Colour Sergeant Peter Roberts – Royal Marines Reserve

== Australia ==
The Queen's Birthday Honours 2013 for Australia were announced on 10 June 2013.

== Grenada ==
The Queen's Birthday Honours List for 2013 was announced in the London Gazette on 15 June 2013.

=== The Most Excellent Order of the British Empire ===
==== Dame Commander of the Order of the British Empire (DBE) ====
Civil Division

- Justice Monica Theresa Joseph CBE – For service to the public and the law.

==== Officer of the Order of the British Empire (OBE) ====
Civil Division

- Jeanette DuBois – For services to education and to the community.
- Veda Gemma Bruno-Victor BEM – For services to sport and to the community.

==== Member of the Order of the British Empire (MBE) ====
Civil Division

- Cecelia Cruickshank – For services to nursing and to the community.

=== British Empire Medal (BEM) ===
Civil Division

- Thomas Alexis – For services to the community.
- Terry Charles – For services to the community.
- Loraine Maxwell – For services to Mental Health and to the community.

== Papua New Guinea ==
The Queen's Birthday Honours List for 2013 was announced in the London Gazette on 15 June 2013.

=== Knight Bachelor ===
- Manasupe Zure Zurenuoc OBE – For distinguished public service, especially as Chief Secretary to the Government.

=== The Most Distinguished Order of Saint Michael and Saint George ===
==== Knight Commander of the Order of Saint Michael and Saint George (KCMG) ====
- Ninian Mogan Lourdenadin KBE – For services to commerce, particularly in agribusiness and shipping, in creating employment and training opportunities and to the community in supporting healthcare and humanitarian causes.

==== Companion of the Order of Saint Michael and Saint George (CMG) ====
- The Honourable William Duma MP MP – For service to resource sector policy and development as a Member of Parliament and State Minister.
- The Honourable Patrick Pruaitch MP MP – For services to public policy development as a Member of Parliament and senior State Minister.

=== The Most Excellent Order of the British Empire ===
==== Knight Commander of the Order of the British Empire (KBE) ====
Civil Division

- Nambuga Mara OBE – For service to the Western Highlands region through contributions at the local and provincial government levels, including service as Premier.
- The Honourable Bernard Berekia Sakora CBE – For service to the judiciary as a Judge in the National and Supreme Courts, and for community service.

==== Commander of the Order of the British Empire (CBE) ====
Civil Division

- Veitu Diro – For long and distinguished service to the community and the role of women in sports, particularly netball.
- Peter M. Graham – For services to the petroleum industry and to the community through supporting social development initiatives.

==== Officer of the Order of the British Empire (OBE) ====
Civil Division

- Robert Guba Aisi – For diplomatic service as Papua New Guinea's Representative to the United Nations.
- Bernard Brendan Chan – For services to business and to sports administration.
- David Hunter Cox – For services to the community through supporting sports and charities.
- Noel James Goodyear – For services to the community of Karkar in the Madang Province.
- Merianne J. Guere – For services to Human Resource Higher Competency Training.
- Joseph Kintau – For services to civil aviation and to the community.
- Ouka Lavaki – For services to education and to the Scouts movement.
- Patrick J. Leslie – For public service and services to the community.
- Igimu Momo – For public service and services to State-owned enterprises.
- Elsie Paisawa BEM – For services to Air Niugini's Human Resource Management and Training.
- Professor Jeffrey Rosenfeld – For services to neurosurgery and the UPNG School of Medicine.
- Dr. Oruvu Sepoe – For services to higher education and to Women's development.

Military Division

- Colonel Michael Augustine Daniel MBE – Papua New Guinea Defence Force

==== Member of the Order of the British Empire (MBE) ====
Civil Division

- Goodwill Tony Amos BEM – For public service in forestry management.
- Damien Tipawai Arabagali – For services to the community.
- The Reverend Baafekec Bamiringnuc – For services to the community and to the Lutheran Church.
- Kenneth William Blain – For services to the community and to air transportation.
- Gorua Dirona – For services to business development.
- Franck Evans – For services to education and to the community.
- Nixon Forova – For services to education.
- Peter Stuart Gall – For public service and services to the community.
- Jeffrey Barth Gawi – For services to education.
- The Reverend Father Peter Guimei – For services to the Anglican Church.
- Patricia Ann Heron – For services to shipping and charities.
- Sister Anne Hibunon – For services to the Catholic Church and to vocational training.
- Johanis Sanewai Kileap – For services to the community and to cultural development.
- Geno Kini – For services to forestry management.
- Meli Apolos Kivung – For services to national apprenticeship and trades management.
- Maclaren Komota – For services to the community.
- Joseph Konu – For diplomatic service and services to the community.
- Alois Longrie – For services to education.
- Peter James Michael – For services to the community.
- Pius Puk – For provincial public service.
- Joseph Usera Solulu – For services to education.
- Herman Tambagle – For services to education.
- William Benedict Vate – For public service.
- Francis Vilamur – For public service in forestry management.
- Moses George Woruba – For services to agriculture.
- Darren James Young – For services to commerce and to the community.

Military Division

- Colonel Walter Enuma – Papua New Guinea Defence Force.
- Colonel Raymond Numa – Papua New Guinea Defence Force.
- Lieutenant Colonel Craig Solomon – Papua New Guinea Defence Force

=== British Empire Medal (BEM) ===
Civil Division

- Mark Aaron – For services to Government House.
- Clement Acman – For services to education.
- Bertha Amaka – For services to rural healthcare.
- Mathew Areke – For services to provincial government.
- Agnes Bomai – For services to rural healthcare.
- Lucy Dawe – For services to rural healthcare.
- Timothy Doa – For services to Government House.
- Gellie Guinness – For services to the community.
- Daniel Tawasek Holonga – For services to the community.
- Hegoi Igo – For services to the insurance industry.
- Moses Ipmawara – For services to the community.
- Clement Kalap – For services to the community.
- Anton Kose – For services to the community.
- Leo Larson – For services to provincial government.
- Alex Nakanol – For services to education.
- Nicholas Nale – For services to education.
- Catherine Mary Nicol – For services to the Anglicare HIV/AIDS Programme.
- Pandi Nowatu – For services to the community.
- Lawrence Onga – For services to the community.
- Harry Raepa – For services to the community.
- Cleopas George Roa – For provincial public service.
- Duwang Sakulgo – For services to rural healthcare.
- Gibson Saura – For services to the community.
- Fabian Siune – For services to the community and to youth.
- Robin Tandamat – For services to education.
- Joseph Tep – For services to the community.
- Valian Tutanava – For services to the airline industry.
- Serrie Irima Wartovo – For services to the airline industry.
- Danny Yopo – For provincial public service.

Military Division

- Chief Petty Officer Raily Garuda – Papua New Guinea Defence Force.
- Warrant Officer Seth Gerari – Papua New Guinea Defence Force.
- Chief Petty Officer Peter Givere – Papua New Guinea Defence Force.
- Warrant Officer James Tomana – Papua New Guinea Defence Force.

=== Queen's Police Medal (QPM) ===
- Chief Superintendent Peter Guinness BEM – For services to the Royal Papua New Guinea Constabulary.
- Superintendent Rigga Neggi – For services to the Royal Papua New Guinea Constabulary.

== Solomon Islands ==
The Queen's Birthday Honours List for 2013 was announced in the London Gazette on 15 June 2013.

=== The Most Excellent Order of the British Empire ===
==== Member of the Order of the British Empire (MBE) ====
Civil Division

- Abraham Eke – For services to football and to business.

=== British Empire Medal (BEM) ===
Civil Division

- Patricia Sabana Mae Dallu – For services to the development of the private sector, to the community, to the Church and to women's organisations.
- Gad Hagasuramo – For services to ACOM, to the community and to local politics.
- Victor Emmanuel Kaihou – For services to agriculture.
- Nemuel Laufilu – For services to the Church, education and rehabilitation services. (to be dated 5 May 2013.)
- Andrew Mua – For public service, services to the community, and to the politics of Si, Solomon Islands.
- George Winston Suri – For services to the community and to politics.

=== Queen's Police Medal (QPM) ===
- Alfred Uiga – For services to the Royal Solomon Islands Police Force.

== Tuvalu ==
The Queen's Birthday Honours List for 2013 was announced in the London Gazette on 15 June 2013.

=== The Most Excellent Order of the British Empire ===
==== Officer of the Order of the British Empire (OBE) ====
Civil Division

- Feleti P. Teo – For services to Government.

==== Member of the Order of the British Empire (MBE) ====
Civil Division

- Iosefa Elisala – For services to the community.
- Seve Lausaveve – For services to the Government and to the community.
- Fiamalua Pauava – For services to the Government and to the community.

=== British Empire Medal (BEM) ===
Civil Division

- Lepalo Falasa – For services to education and to the community.
- Fauvaka Keneseli – For services to the community.
- Aifou Tafia – For services to the community.

== Saint Lucia ==
The Queen's Birthday Honours List for 2013 was announced in the London Gazette on 15 June 2013.

=== The Most Distinguished Order of Saint Michael and Saint George ===
==== Companion of the Order of Saint Michael and Saint George (CMG) ====
- Nathalbert Polycarp Husbands – For services to the Nation.

=== The Most Excellent Order of the British Empire ===
==== Officer of the Order of the British Empire (OBE) ====
Civil Division

- Andre Chastanet – For services to business.
- Anthony Joseph Neville Skeete – For services to national development.

==== Member of the Order of the British Empire (MBE) ====
Civil Division

- Marcus Day – For humanitarian services.
- Sylvestre Phillip – For services to education and to the community.
- Jeremiah Finbar De Lellis Sullivan – For services to education.
- Rosamund Elizabeth Josephine Taylor – For public service.

=== British Empire Medal (BEM) ===
Civil Division

- Roseline Etienne Joseph – For services to education and community development.
- Richard Lascaris – For services to the fishing industry.
- Linus Leon – For services to the Fisheries sector.
- Edward Edwin Mangaroo – For services to the Fisheries Co-operative movement.
- John Noel – For services to the community.

== Belize ==
The Queen's Birthday Honours List for 2013 was announced in the London Gazette on 15 June 2013.

=== The Most Excellent Order of the British Empire ===
==== Officer of the Order of the British Empire (OBE) ====
Civil Division

- Frank Alexander Lizama – For services to art, education and politics.
- Colville Ludwig Young (Jr.) – For services to education and music.

==== Member of the Order of the British Empire (MBE) ====
Civil Division

- Norman Samuel Elburt Hamilton – For services to music.

== See also ==
- Australian Honours System
- New Zealand Royal Honours System
- Orders, decorations and medals of the United Kingdom
