= List of Royal Air Force air chief marshals =

The following is a list of Royal Air Force air chief marshals. The rank of air chief marshal is a four-star officer rank and currently the highest rank to which RAF officers may be promoted to in a professional capacity. Throughout the history of the RAF there have been 142 RAF officers promoted to air chief marshal and at present two RAF officers hold the rank in an active capacity. They are Harvey Smyth, the Chief of the Air Staff and Sir Richard Knighton as Chief of the Defence Staff.

The rank was first used in 1922 when Sir Hugh Trenchard the then Chief of the Air Staff was promoted. Up until the mid-1930s there was usually only one RAF officer in the rank of air chief marshal. During World War II, with the great expansion of the RAF, the number of air chief marshals active at any one time peaked at nine during the War. This number of air chief marshals was to remain approximately constant throughout the Cold War but after the British defence cuts of the mid-1990s there were only two dedicated 4-star RAF posts, namely the AOC-in-C, Strike Command and the Chief of the Air Staff. In 2007 with the reduction to a single command (Air Command) the RAF initially retained two air chief marshal posts (the AOC-in-C, Air Command and the Chief of the Air Staff) but in 2012 the post of AOC-in-C, Air Command was subsumed within the responsibilities of the Chief of the Air Staff leaving only a single dedicated RAF air chief marshal post.

== List of air chief marshals ==
Name	Date rank first held	Date rank last held	Time in rank	Posts held in rank	Notes
Sir John Aiken	8 July 1976	31 March 1978	1 year, 266 days	Air Member for Personnel	promoted 8 July 1976, retired 31 March 1978
Sir Michael Alcock	1993	25 June 1996	Approx. 3 years	AOC-in-C Logistics Command	promoted 1993, retired 25 June 1996
Sir John Allison	8 March 1996	6 September 1999	3 years, 182 days	AOC-in-C Logistics Command; AOC-in-C, Strike Command	promoted 8 March 1996, retired at own request 6 September 1999
Sir Michael Armitage	1 July 1986	5 April 1990	3 years, 278 days	Air Member for Supply and Organisation; Commandant Royal College of Defence Studies	promoted 1 July 1986, retired 5 April 1990
Sir Anthony Bagnall	6 April 2000	31 October 2005	5 years, 208 days	AOC-in-C Strike Command; Vice-Chief of the Defence Staff	promoted 11 April 2000, retired 31 October 2005
Sir John Baker	2 January 1952	17 December 1956	4 years, 350 days	Deputy Chief of the Air Staff; Vice-Chief of the Air Staff; Controller of Aircraft	promoted 2 January 1952, retired 17 December 1956
The Earl of Bandon	1 July 1959	1 December 1963	4 years, 153 days	C-in-C Far East Air Force; Commander Allied Air Forces Central Europe	promoted 1 July 1959, retired 1 December 1963
Sir Denis Barnett	1 July 1962	27 November 1964	2 years, 149 days	AOC-in-C Near East Air Force; Commander British Forces Cyprus; Administrator of the Sovereign Base Areas	promoted 1 July 1962, retired 27 November 1964
Sir John Barraclough	3 September 1973	3 April 1976	2 years, 213 days	Air Secretary; Commandant Royal College of Defence Studies	promoted 3 September 1973, retired 3 April 1976
Sir Arthur Barratt	1 January 1946	27 March 1947	1 year, 85 days	Inspector-General of the RAF	promoted 1 January 1946, retired 27 March 1947
Sir Michael Beavis	14 March 1984	3 January 1987	2 years, 295 days	DC-in-C Allied Forces Central Europe	acting promotion 14 March 1984, substantive promotion 1 July 1984, retired 3 January 1987
Sir Michael Beetham	21 May 1977	15 October 1982	5 years, 147 days	C-in-C RAF Germany; Chief of the Air Staff	promoted 21 May 1977, promoted marshal of the RAF 15 October 1982
Sir John Boothman	1 October 1954	3 May 1956	1 year, 215 days	AOC-in-C Coastal Command	promoted 1 October 1954, retired 3 May 1956
Sir Norman Bottomley	23 March 1947	1 January 1948	284 days	Inspector-General of the RAF	promoted 23 March 1947, retired 1 January 1948
Sir Frederick Bowhill	1 November 1939	29 March 1945	5 years, 148 days	AOC-in-C Coastal Command; Commander of the RAF's Ferry Organisation; AOC Ferry Command; AOC-in-C Transport Command	temporary promotion 1 November 1939, acting promotion 1 July 1942, retained the rank on retirement 29 March 1945
Sir Dermot Boyle	1 January 1956	1 January 1958	2 years, 0 days	Chief of the Air Staff	promoted 1 January 1956, promoted marshal of the RAF 1 January 1958
Sir Harry Broadhurst	14 February 1957	1 March 1961	4 years, 15 days	AOC-in-C Bomber Command; Commander Allied Air Forces Central Europe	promoted 14 February 1957, retired 1 March 1961
Sir Robert Brooke-Popham	1 January 1935	May 1942	Approx. 4 years, 10 months	AOC-in-C, Air Defence of Great Britain; Inspector-General of the RAF; AOC-in-C RAF Middle East; Head of the RAF Training Mission in Canada; Head of the RAF Training Mission in South Africa; C-in-C Far East Command	promoted 1 January 1935, retired 6 March 1937, restored to active service in 1939, final retirement May 1942
Sir Simon Bryant	18 June 2010	24 June 2012	2 years, 6 days	C-in-C Air Command	promoted 18 June 2010 retired 24 June 2012
Sir Brian Burnett	7 October 1967	11 March 1972	4 years, 156 days	Air Secretary; C-in-C Far East Command	promoted 7 October 1967, retired 11 March 1972
Sir Charles Burnett	1 January 1940	June 1942	Approx. 2 years, 5 months	Chief of the Australian Air Staff	acting promotion 1 January 1940, retired June 1942
Sir Brian Burridge	31 July 2003	18 January 2006	2 years, 171 days	AOC-in-C Strike Command	promoted 31 July 2003, retired 18 January 2006
Sir Neil Cameron	1 November 1975	31 July 1977	1 year, 272 days	Air Member for Personnel; Chief of the Air Staff	promoted 1 November 1975, promoted marshal of the RAF 31 July 1977
Sir John Cheshire	11 March 1997	2000	Approx. 3 years	C-in-C Allied Forces North West Europe	promoted 11 March 1997, retired 2000
Sir Walter Cheshire	19 November 1962	6 April 1965	2 years, 138 days	Air Member for Personnel	promoted 19 November 1962, retired 6 April 1965
Sir Ralph Cochrane	1 March 1949	29 November 1952	3 years, 273 days	AOC-in-C Flying Training Command; Vice Chief of the Air Staff	promoted 1 March 1949, retired 29 November 1952
Sir Hugh Constantine	12 September 1961	30 May 1964	2 years, 261 days	Commandant of the Imperial Defence College	promoted 12 September 1961, retired 30 May 1964
Sir Alec Coryton	15 May 1950	15 May 1951	1 year, 0 days	Chief Executive Guided Weapons at the Ministry of Supply	promoted 15 May 1950, retired 15 May 1951
Sir Christopher Courtney	1 January 1942	9 November 1945	3 years, 312 days	Air Member for Supply and Organisation	temporary promotion 1 January 1942, permanent promotion 1 June 1943, retired 9 November 1945
Sir David Cousins	1 August 1997	11 November 1998	1 year, 102 days	AOC-in-C Personnel and Training Command	promoted 1 August 1997, retired 11 November 1998
Sir David Craig	20 September 1982	14 November 1988	6 years, 55 days	AOC-in-C Strike Command; Chief of the Air Staff	acting promotion 20 September 1982, substantive promotion 1 July 1983, promoted marshal of the RAF 14 November 1988
Sir Kenneth Cross	1 October 1965	24 February 1967	1 year, 146 days	AOC-in-C Transport Command	promoted 1 October 1965, retired 24 February 1967
Sir Stephen Dalton	31 July 2009	15 January 2014	4 years, 168 days	Chief of the Air Staff	promoted 31 July 2009, retired 15 January 2014
Sir John Davis	1 January 1967	21 June 1969	2 years, 171 days	AOC-in-C Flying Training Command; AOC-in-C Training Command	promoted 1 January 1967, retired 21 June 1969
Sir Walter Dawson	1 June 1956	6 May 1960	3 years, 340 days	Inspector-General of the RAF; Air Member for Supply and Organisation	promoted 1 June 1956, retired 6 May 1960
Sir John Day	10 April 2001	1 September 2003	2 years, 144 days	AOC-in-C Strike Command	promoted 10 April 2001, retired 1 September 2003
Sir William Dickson	8 January 1951	1 June 1954	3 years, 144 days	Air Member for Supply and Organisation; Chief of the Air Staff	promoted 18 January 1951, promoted marshal of the RAF 1 June 1954
Sir Sholto Douglas	6 June 1945	1 January 1946	209 days	C-in-C British Forces of Occupation, Germany	promoted 6 June 1945, promoted marshal of the RAF 1 January 1946
Sir Hugh Dowding	1 January 1937	15 July 1942	5 years, 195 days	AOC-in-C, Fighter Command; Head of British Air Commission, Washington	promoted 1 January 1937, last day of paid service 14 July 1942, retired 15 July 1942
Sir Alfred Earle	1 April 1964	6 June 1966	2 years, 66 days	Vice-Chief of the Defence Staff	promoted 1 April 1964, retired 6 June 1966
Sir Edward Ellington	1 January 1933	1 January 1937	4 years, 0 days	Air Member for Personnel; Chief of the Air Staff	promoted 1 January 1933, promoted marshal of the RAF 1 January 1937
Sir William Elliot	1 April 1951	18 April 1954	3 years, 17 days	Chairman of the British Joint Services Mission in Washington	promoted 1 April 1951, retired 18 April 1954
Sir Charles Elworthy	1 September 1962	1 April 1967	4 years, 212 days	C-in-C Middle East Command; Chief of the Air Staff	promoted 1 September 1962, promoted marshal of the RAF 1 April 1967
Sir Basil Embry	16 July 1953	26 February 1956	2 years, 225 days	C-in-C Allied Air Forces Central Europe	acting promotion 16 July 1953, substantive promotion 1 December 1953, retired 26 February 1956
Sir David Evans	26 March 1977	9 August 1983	6 years, 136 days	AOC-in-C, Strike Command; Vice-Chief of the Defence Staff	acting promotion 26 March 1977, substantive promotion 31 March 1978, retired 9 August 1983
Sir Donald Evans	1 March 1967	28 February 1970	2 years, 364 days	Air Secretary; Commandant Royal College of Defence Studies	promoted 1 March 1967, retired 28 February 1970
Sir Douglas Evill	1 January 1946	15 January 1947	1 year, 14 days	Vice-Chief of the Air Staff	promoted 1 January 1946, retired 15 January 1947
Sir Peter Fletcher	1 May 1971	30 July 1973	2 years, 90 days	Controller of Aircraft	promoted 1 May 1971, retired 30 July 1973
Sir Francis Fogarty	1 November 1953	29 January 1957	3 years, 89 days	Air Member for Personnel	promoted 1 November 1953, retired 29 January 1957
Sir Robert Foster	28 January 1953	1 February 1954	1 year, 4 days	C-in-C Second Tactical Air Force	promoted 28 January 1953, retired 1 February 1954
Sir Christopher Foxley-Norris	1 December 1970	22 April 1974	3 years, 142 days	C-in-C Second Tactical Air Force; Chief of Personnel and Logistics	promoted 1 December 1970, retired 22 April 1974
Sir Wilfrid Freeman	27 May 1940	19 October 1942	2 years, 145 days	Air Member for Development and Production; Vice-Chief of the Air Staff	temporary promotion 27 May 1940, substantive promotion 14 April 1942 (with seniority backdated to 27 May 1940), retired 19 October 1942
Sir Robert Freer	1 January 1980	3 April 1982	2 years, 92 days	Commandant Royal College of Defence Studies	promoted 1 January 1980, retired 3 April 1982
Sir Joe French	13 January 2006	2007	Approx. 1 year	AOC-in-C Strike Command	promoted 13 January 2006, retired 2007
Sir Guy Garrod	1 January 1946	9 October 1948	2 years, 282 days	Permanent RAF Representative on the UN Military Staff Committee; Head of the RAF Delegation, Washington	promoted 1 January 1946, retired 9 October 1948
Sir Joseph Gilbert	1 January 1987	9 August 1989	2 years, 220 days	Deputy C-in-C Allied Forces Central Europe	promoted 1 January 1987, retired 9 August 1989
Sir John Gingell	7 April 1981	22 June 1984	3 years, 76 days	Deputy C-in-C Allied Forces Central Europe	acting promotion 7 April 1981, substantive promotion 1 January 1982 retired 22 June 1984
Sir John Grandy	1 April 1965	1 April 1971	6 years, 0 days	C-in-C Far East Command; Chief of the Air Staff	promoted 1 April 1965, promoted marshal of the RAF 1 April 1971
Sir Michael Graydon	31 May 1990	9 August 1997	7 years, 70 days	AOC-in-C, RAF Support Command; AOC-in-C, Strike Command; Chief of the Air Staff	promoted 31 May 1990, retired 9 August 1997
Sir David Harcourt-Smith	1 January 1987	20 May 1989	2 years, 139 days	Controller Aircraft	promoted 1 January 1987, retired 20 May 1989
Sir Peter Harding	1 January 1985	6 November 1992	7 years, 310 days	AOC-in-C Strike Command; Chief of the Air Staff; Chief of the Defence Staff	promoted 1 January 1985, promoted marshal of the RAF 6 November 1992
Sir Donald Hardman	1 April 1955	29 January 1958	2 years, 303 days	Air Member for Supply and Organisation	promoted 1 April 1955, retired 29 January 1958
Sir Arthur Harris	18 March 1943	1 January 1946	2 years, 289 days	AOC-in-C Bomber Command	"Bomber Harris". Acting promotion 18 March 1943, temporary promotion 16 August 1944, promoted marshal of the RAF 1 January 1946
Sir Anthony Heward	29 April 1974	30 June 1976	2 years, 62 days	Air Member for Supply and Organisation	promoted 29 April 1974, retired 30 June 1976
Sir Roderic Hill	16 January 1947	1 July 1948	1 year, 167 days	Air Member for Technical Services	promoted 16 January 1947, retired 1 July 1948
Sir Stephen Hillier	11 July 2016	22 April 2020	3 years, 286 days	Chief of the Air Staff	promoted 11 July 2016 retired 22 April 2020
Sir Patrick Hine	1 July 1985	1 September 1991	6 years, 62 days	Vice-Chief of the Defence Staff; Air Member for Supply and Organisation; AOC-in-C Strike Command	promoted 1 July 1985, retired 1 September 1991
Sir Lewis Hodges	1 May 1971	2 May 1976	5 years, 1 day	Air Member for Personnel; Deputy C-in-C HQ Allied Forces Central Europe	promoted 1 May 1971, retired 2 May 1976
Sir Derek Hodgkinson	22 April 1974	8 May 1976	2 years, 16 days	Air Secretary	promoted 22 April 1974, retired 8 May 1976
Sir Leslie Hollinghurst	15 May 1950	27 December 1952	2 years, 226 days	Air Member for Personnel	promoted 15 May 1950, retired 27 December 1952
Sir Edmund Hudleston	1 March 1961	5 June 1967	6 years, 96 days	AOC-in-C Transport Command; Commander Allied Air Forces Central Europe; Deputy C-in-C Allied Forces Central Europe	promoted 1 March 1961, retired 5 June 1967
Sir Andrew Humphrey	1 December 1970	6 August 1976	5 years, 249 days	AOC-in-C Strike Command; Chief of the Air Staff	promoted 1 December 1970, promoted marshal of the RAF 6 August 1976
Sir Ronald Ivelaw-Chapman	1 November 1953	29 October 1957	3 years, 362 days	Vice-Chief of the Air Staff	promoted 1 November 1953, retired 29 October 1957
Sir Brendan Jackson	1 January 1990	5 November 1993	3 years, 308 days	Air Member for Supply and Organisation	promoted 1 January 1990, retired 5 November 1993
Sir Richard Johns	30 June 1994	April 2000	Approx. 5 years, 10 months	C-in-C Allied Forces North West Europe; Chief of the Air Staff	promoted 30 June 1994, retired April 2000
Sir Philip Joubert de la Ferté	1 July 1941	23 November 1943	2 years, 145 days	AOC-in-C Coastal Command; Inspector-General of the RAF; Deputy Chief of Staff (Information and Civil Affairs), SEAC	temporary promotion 1 July 1941, substantive promotion 14 April 1942 (with seniority backdated to 1 July 1941), rank relinquished 23 November 1943, rank retained on retirement 14 November 1945
Sir Thomas Kennedy	1 July 1983	10 May 1986	2 years, 313 days	Air Member for Personnel	promoted 1 July 1983, retired 10 May 1986
Sir Michael Knight	1 July 1986	18 November 1989	3 years, 140 days	UK Military Representative to NATO	promoted 1 July 1986, retired 18 November 1989
Sir Rich Knighton	2 June 2023	active in rank	2 years, 88 days	Chief of the Air Staff; Chief of the Defence Staff	promoted 2 June 2023
Sir Wallace Kyle	1 January 1964	9 November 1968	4 years, 313 days	Vice-Chief of the Air Staff; AOC-in-C Bomber Command; AOC-in-C Strike Command	promoted 1 January 1964, retired 9 November 1968
Sir Peter Le Cheminant	2 February 1976	27 August 1979	3 years, 206 days	DC-in-C Allied Forces Central Europe	promoted 2 February 1976, retired 27 August 1979
Sir David Lee	7 October 1967	19 March 1971	3 years, 163 days	Air Member for Personnel; UK Military Representative, NATO Military Committee	promoted 7 October 1967, retired 19 March 1971
Sir Trafford Leigh-Mallory	15 December 1943	14 November 1944	335 days	C-in-C Allied Expeditionary Air Force	acting promotion 15 December 1943, substantive temporary promotion 16 August 1944, died on active service 14 November 1944
Sir Hugh Lloyd	15 May 1951	4 June 1953	2 years, 20 days	AOC-in-C Bomber Command	promoted 15 May 1951 (seniority dated from 1 April 1951), retired 4 June 1953
Sir Clive Loader	30 March 2007	1 August 2009	2 years, 124 days	C-in-C Air Command	promoted 30 March 2007, retired 1 August 2009
Sir Arthur Longmore	1 November 1939	1 March 1942	2 years, 120 days	AOC-in-C Training Command; Member of British Air Mission to Australia and New Zealand; AOC-in-C Middle East Command; Inspector-General of the RAF	temporary promotion 1 November 1939, rank retained on retirement 1 March 1942, recalled to active service in the rank of air vice-marshal on 1 August 1943, resumed the rank of air chief marshal on final retirement 1 June 1944
Sir Douglas Lowe	3 November 1975	22 August 1983	7 years, 292 days	Controller of Aircraft; Chief of Defence Procurement	promoted 3 November 1975, retired 22 August 1983
Sir Edgar Ludlow-Hewitt	1 July 1937	19 November 1945	8 years, 141 days	AOC-in-C Bomber Command; Inspector-General of the RAF	promoted 1 July 1937, retired 19 November 1945
Sir William MacDonald	1 September 1963	11 August 1966	2 years, 344 days	Air Secretary	promoted 1 September 1963, retired 11 August 1966
Sir Nigel Maynard	8 May 1976	21 May 1977	1 year, 13 days	AOC-in-C Strike Command	promoted 8 May 1976, retired at own request 21 May 1977
Sir Theodore McEvoy	1 November 1958	19 November 1962	4 years, 18 days	Chief of Staff, HQ Allied Air Forces Central Europe; Air Secretary	promoted 1 November 1958, retired 19 November 1962
Sir Charles Medhurst	1 May 1948	19 April 1950	1 year, 353 days	Head of British Joint Services Mission, Washington DC	promoted 1 May 1948, retired 19 April 1950
Sir Walter Merton	1 June 1961	29 August 1963	2 years, 89 days	Air Member for Supply and Organisation	promoted 1 June 1961, retired 29 August 1963
Sir George Mills	1 January 1956	18 September 1962	6 years, 260 days	Commander of Allied Air Forces Central Europe; Chairman of the NATO Standing Group	acting promotion 1 January 1956, substantive promotion 1 June 1956, retired 18 September 1962
Sir William Mitchell	9 September 1939	13 May 1940	247 days	AOC-in-C RAF Middle East; Inspector-General of the RAF	acting promotion 9 September 1939, rank relinquished 13 May 1940, retained the rank on retirement 1 October 1941
Sir Chris Moran	3 April 2009	26 May 2010	1 year, 53 days	C-in-C Air Command	promoted 3 April 2009, died suddenly while serving 26 May 2010
Sir Cyril Newall	1 April 1937	4 October 1940	3 years, 186 days	Air Member for Supply and Organisation; Chief of the Air Staff	promoted 1 April 1937, promoted marshal of the RAF 4 October 1940
Sir Roger Palin	22 April 1991	1 July 1993	2 years, 70 days	Air Member for Personnel	promoted 22 April 1991, retired 1 July 1993
Sir Keith Park	1 August 1945	20 December 1946	1 year, 141 days	AOC-in-C RAF Middle East Command; Allied C-in-C Air Command, South East Asia	acting promotion 1 August 1945, rank retained on retirement 20 December 1946
Sir David Parry-Evans	1 July 1989	29 February 1992	2 years, 243 days	Air Member for Personnel	promoted 1 July 1989, retired 29 February 1992
Sir Hubert Patch	1 April 1959	29 May 1961	2 years, 58 days	Air Member for Personnel; Commander, British Forces Arabian Peninsula	promoted 1 April 1959, retired 29 May 1961
Sir Stuart Peach	1 December 2011	31 March 2022	10 years, 120 days	Commander of Joint Forces Command; Vice-Chief of the Defence Staff; Chief of the Defence Staff; Chairman of the NATO Military Committee	promoted 1 December 2011, retired 31 March 2022
Sir Richard Peirse	1 July 1942	6 May 1945	2 years, 309 days	AOC-in-C Air Forces in India; C-in-C Air Command South-East Asia	temporary promotion 1 July 1942, retained the rank on retirement 6 May 1945
Sir Claude Pelly	14 February 1957	13 November 1959	2 years, 272 days	Controller of Aircraft	promoted 14 February 1957, retired 13 November 1959
Sir Thomas Pike	1 November 1957	6 April 1962	4 years, 156 days	AOC-in-C, Fighter Command; Chief of the Air Staff	promoted 1 November 1957, promoted marshal of the RAF 6 April 1962
Sir George Pirie	1 March 1949	15 October 1951	2 years, 228 days	Air Member for Supply and Organisation; Head of RAF Staff, British Joint Services Mission (Washington)	promoted 1 March 1949, retired 15 October 1951
Sir Malcolm Pledger	2 September 2002	18 April 2005	2 years, 228 days	Chief of Defence Logistics	promoted 2 September 2002, retired 18 April 2005
Sir Charles Portal	14 April 1942	1 January 1944	2 years, 48 days	Chief of the Air Staff	promoted 14 April 1942, promoted marshal of the RAF 1 January 1944
Sir Thomas Prickett	1 May 1969	1 October 1970	1 year, 153 days	Air Member for Supply and Organisation	promoted 1 May 1969, retired at own request 1 October 1970
Sir Andrew Pulford	22 July 2013	28 October 2016	3 years, 98 days	Chief of the Air Staff	promoted 22 July 2013, retired 28 October 2016
Sir James Robb	1 October 1948	26 November 1951	3 years, 56 days	C-in-C Air Forces, Western Union Defence Organisation; Inspector-General of the RAF	promoted 1 October 1948, medically retired 26 November 1951
Sir Rex Roe	1 December 1978	1 August 1981	2 years, 243 days	Air Member for Supply and Organisation	promoted 1 December 1978, retired at own request 1 August 1981
Sir John Rogers	1 January 1984	31 March 1986	2 years, 89 days	Controller of Aircraft	promoted 1 January 1984, retired 31 March 1986
Sir Frederick Rosier	1 March 1970	3 September 1973	3 years, 186 days	Deputy C-in-C Allied Forces Central Europe	promoted 1 March 1970, retired 3 September 1973
Sir Geoffrey Salmond	1 January 1933	27 April 1933	116 days	AOC-in-C, Air Defence of Great Britain; Chief of the Air Staff	promoted 1 January 1933, died of natural causes while serving 27 April 1933
Sir John Salmond	1 January 1929	1 January 1933	4 years, 0 days	Air Member for Personnel; Chief of the Air Staff	promoted 1 January 1929, promoted marshal of the RAF 1 January 1933
Sir Arthur Sanders	16 October 1951	29 January 1956	4 years, 105 days	Deputy Chief of the Air Staff; Commander-in-Chief RAF Middle East Air Force; Commandant of the Imperial Defence College	promoted 16 October 1951, retired 29 January 1956
Sir Hugh Saunders	15 May 1950	22 September 1953	3 years, 130 days	Air Deputy to Supreme Allied Commander Europe	promoted 15 May 1950, retired 22 September 1953
Sir Anthony Skingsley	1 May 1989	31 December 1992	3 years, 244 days	Deputy C-in-C, HQ Allied Air Forces Central Europe	promoted 1 May 1989, retired 31 December 1992
Sir John Slessor	1 January 1946	8 June 1950	4 years, 158 days	Air Member for Personnel; Commandant Imperial Defence College; Chief of the Air Staff	promoted 1 January 1946, promoted marshal of the RAF 8 June 1950
Sir Denis Smallwood	30 July 1973	30 June 1976	2 years, 336 days	Vice-Chief of the Air Staff; AOC-in-C, Strike Command	promoted 30 July 1973, retired 30 June 1976
Sir Harvey Smyth	29 August 2025	active in rank	1 year, 74 days	Chief of the Air Staff	promoted 29 August 2025
Sir Denis Spotswood	1 November 1968	31 March 1974	5 years, 150 days	AOC-in-C, Strike Command; Chief of the Air Staff	promoted 1 November 1968, promoted marshal of the RAF 31 March 1974
Sir Peter Squire	29 March 1999	5 December 2003	4 years, 251 days	AOC-in-C Strike Command; Chief of the Air Staff	promoted 29 March 1999, retired 5 December 2003
Sir John Stacey	1 June 1979	1 January 1981	1 year, 214 days	Deputy Commander-in-Chief Allied Forces Central Europe	promoted 1 June 1979, died suddenly while serving 1 January 1981
Sir Neville Stack	2 May 1976	11 February 1978	1 year, 285 days	Air Secretary	promoted 2 May 1976, retired at own request 11 February 1978
Sir Michael Stear	27 August 1992	11 October 1996	4 years, 45 days	Deputy C-in-C Allied Forces Central Europe	promoted 27 August 1992, retired 11 October 1996
Sir Alasdair Steedman	26 October 1977	24 January 1981	3 years, 90 days	UK Military Representative, NATO Military Committee	promoted 26 October 1977, retired 24 January 1981
Sir John Steel	1 July 1936	12 September 1937	1 year, 73 days	AOC-in-C, Air Defence of Great Britain; AOC-in-C, Bomber Command	promoted 1 July 1936, retired 12 September 1937, recalled to active service in the rank of air vice-marshal for periods 28 August 1939 to 27 May 1940 and 15 April 1941 to 26 September 1945, resumed the rank of air chief marshal on final retirement (with seniority backdated to 1 July 1936) 26 September 1945
Sir Jock Stirrup	1 August 2003	4 April 2011	7 years, 246 days	Chief of the Air Staff; Chief of the Defence Staff	promoted 1 August 2003, retired 4 April 2011, promoted marshal of the RAF 13 June 2014
Sir Arthur Tedder	1 July 1942	12 September 1945	3 years, 73 days	AOC-in-C RAF Middle East Command; Air C-in-C Mediterranean Air Command; Air C-in-C Mediterranean Allied Air Forces; Air C-in-C and Deputy Supreme Allied Commander SHAEF	temporary promotion 1 July 1942, substantive promotion 6 June 1945, promoted marshal of the RAF 12 September 1945
Sir Peter Terry	1 March 1981	18 October 1984	3 years, 231 days	Deputy C-in-C Allied Forces Central Europe; Deputy Supreme Allied Commander Europe	promoted 1 March 1981, retired 18 October 1984
Sir John Thomson	4 November 1992	10 July 1994	1 year, 248 days	AOC-in-C Strike Command; C-in-C Allied Forces North West Europe	promoted 4 November 1992, died of natural causes while serving 10 July 1994
Sir Glenn Torpy	13 April 2006	31 July 2009	3 years, 109 days	Chief of the Air Staff	promoted 13 April 2006, retired 31 July 2009
Sir Hugh Trenchard	1 April 1922	1 January 1927	4 years, 275 days	Chief of the Air Staff	promoted 1 April 1922, promoted marshal of the RAF 1 January 1927
Sir Ruthven Wade	31 March 1976	31 March 1978	2 years, 0 days	Chief of Personnel and Logistics	promoted 31 March 1976, retired at own request 31 March 1978
Sir Augustus Walker	1 March 1967	7 July 1970	3 years, 128 days	Deputy C-in-C Allied Forces Central Europe	promoted 1 March 1967, retired 7 July 1970
Sir Neil Wheeler	11 March 1972	3 January 1976	3 years, 298 days	Controller Aircraft	promoted 11 March 1972, retired 3 January 1976
Sir John Whitworth-Jones	28 January 1953	29 May 1954	1 year, 121 days	Air Member for Supply and Organisation	promoted 28 January 1953, retired 29 May 1954
Sir Michael Wigston	26 July 2019	2023	c. 4 years	Chief of the Air Staff	promoted 26 July 2019, retired 2023
Sir Keith Williamson	1 March 1981	15 October 1985	4 years, 228 days	AOC-in-C Strike Command; Chief of the Air Staff	promoted 1 March 1981, promoted marshal of the RAF 15 October 1985
Sir John Willis	4 April 1995	10 January 1998	2 years, 281 days	Vice-Chief of the Defence Staff	promoted 4 April 1995, retired 10 January 1998
Sir Andrew Wilson	16 April 1993	26 August 1995	2 years, 132 days	Air Member for Personnel; AOC-in-C Personnel and Training Command	promoted 16 April 1993, retired prematurely 26 August 1995
Sir Bill Wratten	1 September 1994	5 November 1997	3 years, 65 days	AOC-in-C, Strike Command	promoted 1 September 1994, retired 5 November 1997

== Number of air chief marshals by year ==
The following chart indicates the number of serving air chief marshals by year, as counted on 1 January each year.

View source data.

== Honorary air chief marshals ==
- The Prince of Wales, promoted 1 January 1935, assumed the rank of Marshal of the Royal Air Force on 21 January 1936
- The Duke of Gloucester, promoted 27 October 1944
- The Shah of Iran, promoted 5 May 1959
- King Olav V of Norway, promoted 15 September 1959
- Frederik IX of Denmark, promoted 15 September 1959
- Gustaf VI Adolf of Sweden, promoted 15 September 1959
- King Hussein I bin Talal I of Jordan, promoted 19 July 1966
- Princess Alice, Duchess of Gloucester, promoted 23 February 1990
- The Sultan of Brunei, promoted 5 November 1992
- The Duke of Kent, promoted 1 July 1996
- The Prince of Wales, promoted 14 November 2006 promoted to Marshal of the Royal Air Force 16 June 2012
- The Princess Royal, promoted 15 August 2020

== See also ==
- List of United States Air Force four-star generals
- List of Royal Australian Air Force air marshals (includes air chief marshals)
- List of British Army full generals
- List of Royal Marines full generals
- List of Royal Navy admirals
