= Gareth Clayton =

Gareth Clayton may refer to:

- Gareth Clayton (politician)
- Gareth Clayton (RAF officer)
