= Simon Edwards =

Simon Edwards may refer to:

- Simon Edwards (musician), founder of Heartbeat Productions
- Simon Edwards (RAF officer), Royal Air Force officer
