= Maria Byford =

Royal Air Force officer

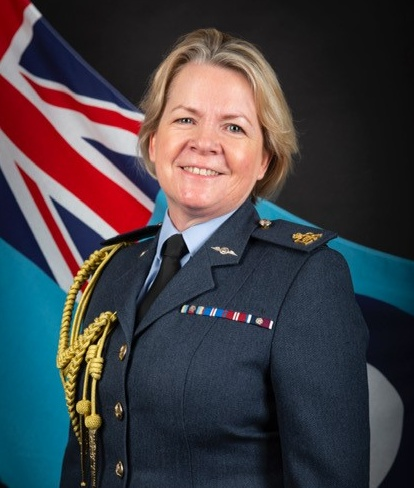
- Military career
- Allegiance: United Kingdom
- Branch: Royal Air Force
- Service years: 1991–2023
- Rank: Air Vice Marshal
- Commands: RAF Medical Services; Medical Joint Force Support
- Conflicts: War in Afghanistan

Air Vice-Marshal Maria Byford, is a senior retired Royal Air Force officer who served as Chief of Staff Personnel and Air Secretary from February 2020 to July 2023.

== RAF career ==
Byford studied dentistry at King's College London, graduating with a Bachelor of Dental Surgery (BDS) degree in 1991. That year, she joined the Royal Air Force (RAF). After a career in dentistry, she became Head of the Personnel Division at HQ Surgeon-General in 2011. Following deployment as commander of Medical Joint Force Support in Afghanistan in 2014, she became Head of Future Healthcare at HQ Surgeon-General in 2015 and Head of RAF Medical Services in 2019. She was appointed Honorary Dental Surgeon to the Queen (QHDS) in 2015.

In February 2020 Byford was appointed Air Secretary with effect from 24 February 2020. She was involved in a RAF recruitment campaign to promote racial and gender diversity in the service, which Sky News alleged discriminated against white men. She retired from the RAF in July 2023.

Military offices
Preceded by Christina Elliot	Air Secretary; 2020–2023	Succeeded by Simon Edwards
