= Ian Michael Stewart =

British air force officer

Ian Stewart
- Military career
- Allegiance: United Kingdom
- Branch: Royal Air Force
- Service years: 1969–2003
- Rank: Air vice-marshal
- Commands: Air Secretary; Harrier Field Force; RAF Gutersloh; No. 1 (Fighter) Squadron
- Awards: Companion of the Order of the Bath; Air Force Cross

Air Vice Marshal Ian Michael Stewart, CB, AFC is a former senior commander in the Royal Air Force who served as Air Secretary from 1998 until his retirement in 2003.

== RAF career ==
Stewart joined the Royal Air Force (RAF) as a pilot in 1969. He flew Harriers, commanded No. 1 (Fighter) Squadron and went on to be Station Commander at RAF Gutersloh and to command the Harrier Field Force in Germany. He became Air Secretary in 1998 before retiring in 2003. He was a member of the Armed Forces Pay Review Body from 2005 to 2011. In retirement he worked for the Defence Vetting Agency in the Gloucestershire / Herefordshire area and was Chairman of Marsden Weighing Machine Group from 2007 to November 2019. From 2017 to June 2020 he served as the Personnel Director on the Gloucestershire Warwickshire Railway.

Military offices
Preceded by Robert'Brien	Air Secretary; 1998–2003	Succeeded by Graham Miller
