= Chris Elliot =

Retired senior Royal Air Force officer

Christina Reid Elliot CB CBE DL
- Elliot in 2018
- Military career
- Allegiance: United Kingdom
- Branch: Royal Air Force
- Service years: 1985–2020
- Rank: Air Vice Marshal
- Awards: Companion of the Order of the Bath; Commander of the Order of the British Empire

Air Vice Marshal Christina Reid Elliot CB CBE DL is a retired senior Royal Air Force officer.

== Military career ==
Educated at the University of Glasgow, Elliot joined the Royal Air Force in 1985. She became a member of the Directing Staff at the Joint Services Command and Staff College in 2006, Group Captain Airspace Control Capability at RAF Air Command in 2007 and station commander at RAF Halton in 2010. She went on to be Group Captain Programmes in Finance, Programmes and Plans at RAF Air Command in 2012.

Elliot was promoted to air commodore on 30 August 2013 and appointed assistant chief of staff training, HQ No. 22 (Training) Group. She was director of ground training at No. 22 Group from 2014, and appointed Air Secretary in 2016. She was succeeded by Air Vice-Marshal Maria Byford on 24 February 2020.

Elliot was appointed Companion of the Order of the Bath (CB) in the 2020 Birthday Honours.

== Later life ==
Since April 2020, having retiring from the Royal Air Force, Elliot has worked as Controller of the RAF Benevolent Fund.

Military offices
Preceded by David Stubbs	Air Secretary; 2016–2020	Succeeded by Maria Byford
