= Robert O'Brien (RAF officer) =

Royal Air Force air marshal

- Military career
- Allegiance: United Kingdom
- Branch: Royal Air Force
- Service years: 1963–1998
- Rank: Air vice-marshal
- Commands: Air Secretary (1994–98); Joint Service Defence College (1992–94)
- Awards: Companion of the Order of the Bath; Officer of the Order of the British Empire

Air Vice Marshal Robert P. O'Brien, CB, OBE is a former senior commander in the Royal Air Force who served as Air Secretary from 1994 until his retirement in 1998.

== RAF career ==
O'Brien joined the Royal Air Force in 1963. He became commandant of the Joint Service Defence College in 1992, and Air Secretary in 1994 before retiring in 1998.

Military offices
Preceded by Robert Honey	Air Secretary; 1994–1998	Succeeded by Ian Stewart
