= Graham Miller (RAF officer) =

Royal Air Force air marshal

Sir Graham Miller
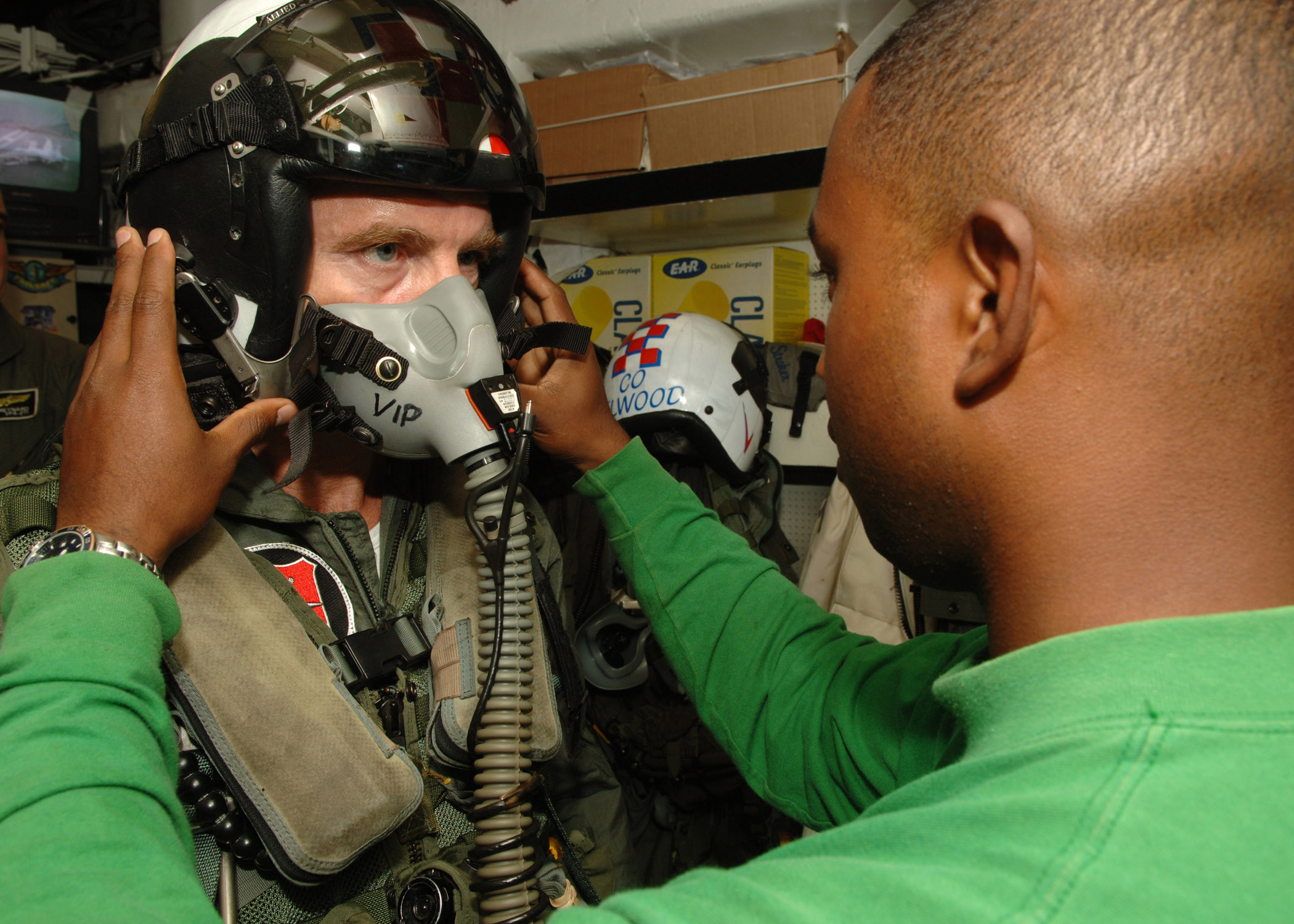
- Air Marshal Miller is helped with his helmet prior to taking off from the United States Navy aircraft carrier USS Enterprise (CVN-65)
- Born: 31 October 1951 (age 74)
- Military career
- Allegiance: United Kingdom
- Branch: Royal Air Force
- Service years: 1967–2007
- Rank: Air Marshal
- Commands: Air Secretary (2003–04); Training Group (2002–03); RAF Lossiemouth (1995–98); No. 17 (F) Squadron (1990–92)
- Conflicts: War in Afghanistan
- Awards: Knight Commander of the Order of the British Empire

Air Marshal Sir Graham Anthony "Dusty" Miller, KBE (born 31 October 1951) is a retired senior Royal Air Force officer.

== RAF career ==
Miller joined the RAF as a craft apprentice in 210th entry, No. 1 School of Technical Training, RAF Halton in 1967. In 1969 he qualified as a junior technician at RAF Halton and was commissioned as an acting pilot officer on 2 January 1970 together with fellow member of 210th entry craft apprentices, Junior Technician Michael David James King. He was appointed Air Officer Commanding Training Group in 2002, Air Secretary in 2003 and Deputy Commander at Joint Force Command in Naples in 2004 before retiring on 31 January 2008. In 2002, he was appointed a Commander of the Order of the British Empire for his service in Saudi Arabia, and upgraded to a Knight Commander of the Order of the British Empire in the 2007 New Year Honours.

He now flies as a RAFVR(T) officer with the Air Experience Flight at RAF Cosford.

Miller was elected national President of the Royal Air Forces Association at the RAF Association's Annual Conference in Eastbourne on 15 May 2011. He was congratulated by the outgoing President, Air Marshal Philip Sturley.

== Other roles ==
Miller served as the High Sheriff of Gloucestershire for 2022–23, and in that role read the Proclamation of accession of Charles III outside the Shire Hall, Gloucester, on 11 September 2022. He served as Warden of the Honourable Company of Gloucestershire for 2017–19.

Military offices
Preceded by Unknown	Air Officer Commanding Training Group; 2002–2003	Succeeded by David Walker
Preceded by Ian Stewart	Air Secretary; 2003–2004	Succeeded by Peter Ruddock
