= Michael Lloyd (RAF officer) =

Royal Air Force officer

Mike Lloyd
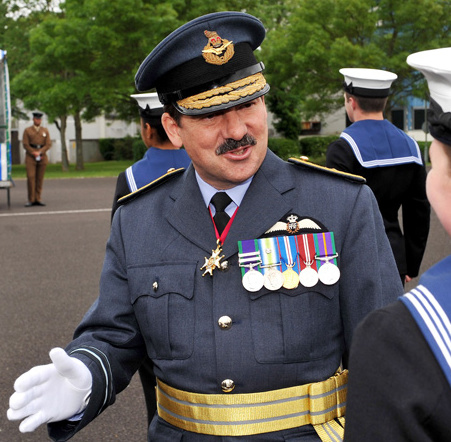
- Air Vice-Marshal Lloyd in 2014
- Military career
- Allegiance: United Kingdom
- Branch: Royal Air Force
- Rank: Air vice-marshal
- Commands: No. 22 Group (2011–14)
- Conflicts: Falklands War
- Awards: Companion of the Order of the Bath

Air Vice Marshal Michael Guy Lloyd, CB was a senior commander in the Royal Air Force who served as the Air Officer Commanding No. 22 Group from 2011 until 2014.

== RAF career ==
Lloyd served with No. 18 Squadron from 1981 to 1985. Promoted to air commodore in 2004, Lloyd became Director of Defence Publicity in 2004, Director of Reserve Forces and Cadets in 2006, and Director of Corporate Affairs in 2008 before becoming Air Secretary in March 2009. In 2011, he became the Air Officer Commanding No. 22 Group. He was appointed a Companion of the Order of the Bath in the 2013 Birthday Honours.

Military offices
Preceded by Simon Bryant	Chief of Staff Personnel and Air Secretary; 2009–2011	Succeeded by Matthew Wiles
Preceded by Mark Green	Air Officer Commanding No. 22 Group; 2011–2014	Succeeded by Andrew Turner
