= Tony Mason (RAF officer) =

British Air Vice Marshal (1932–2023)

- Born: 22 October 1932
- Died: 12 November 2023 (aged 91); Cheltenham, England
- Military career
- Allegiance: United Kingdom
- Branch: Royal Air Force
- Service years: 1956–1989
- Rank: Air Vice-Marshal
- Commands: Air Secretary (1985–89)
- Awards: Companion of the Order of the Bath; Commander of the Order of the British Empire

Air Vice-Marshal Richard Anthony Mason, CB, CBE, DL (22 October 1932 – 12 November 2023) was a Royal Air Force officer who served as Air Secretary.

== Early life ==
Richard Anthony Mason was born on 22 October 1932, as the son of William and Maud Mason. He was educated at the then all-boys private Bradford Grammar School and at the University of St Andrews, from where he graduated with a Master of Arts.

== Military career ==
Mason was commissioned into the Education Branch of the Royal Air Force as a flying officer on 29 June 1956 with the service number 504826. Promoted to flight lieutenant on 29 December 1958, he was appointed to a permanent commission on 1 July 1959. He was promoted to squadron leader on 17 February 1963 and to wing commander on 1 July 1970. He attended the United States Air Forces's Air War College located in Maxwell Air Force Base, Montgomery, Alabama in 1971 and the RAF's Staff College in Bracknell, Berkshire in 1972.

Mason became Director of Defence Studies in 1976. He was promoted to group captain on 1 January 1977. In the 1981 Birthday Honours, he was appointed a Commander of the Order of the British Empire. He was appointed Director of Personnel (Ground) in 1982, and promoted to air commodore on 1 January 1983 as part of the half-yearly promotions. He became Air Secretary in 1985, having been Deputy Air Secretary in 1984. He was promoted to air vice-marshal on 1 January 1986, once again as part of the half-yearly promotions. He was appointed a Companion of the Order of the Bath in the 1988 Birthday Honours. He was succeeded as Air Secretary by Air Vice-Marshal Robert Honey on 10 February 1989.

Mason retired from the Royal Air Force on 22 April 1989.

== Later life ==
Following his retirement from the RAF, Mason became an academic. In 1996, he was made an honorary professor of the University of Birmingham. He had been Director of its Centre for Studies in Security and Diplomacy from 1988 to 2001. He was a specialist air adviser to the House of Commons Defence Committee between 2001 and 2006.

Mason was made an Honorary Fellow of the Royal Aeronautical Society in 2006. In March 2002, he was commissioned a deputy lieutenant to the Lord Lieutenant of Gloucestershire.

== Personal life and death ==
In 1956 Mason married Margaret Sneddon Stewart; they had two daughters Lindsay and Pamela (died 1985). Margaret Mason died in 2023.

Mason died on 12 November 2023, at the age of 91.

== Published works ==
- The Aerospace Revolution: Role Revision and Technology – An Overview
- Mason, Tony To Inherit the Skies: From Spitfire to Tornado, Brassey, 1990, ISBN 0-08-040708-0
- Mason, Tony Air Power: a Centennial Appraisal, Brassey's, 2003, ISBN 978-1-85753-322-4

Military offices
Preceded by Sir Barry Duxbury	Air Secretary; 1985–1989	Succeeded by Robert Honey
