= Robert Honey =

Royal Air Force air marshals

- Military career
- Allegiance: United Kingdom
- Branch: Royal Air Force
- Service years: 1961–1994
- Rank: Air vice-marshal
- Commands: Air Secretary; RAF Coltishall; No. 228 Operational Conversion Unit RAF
- Awards: Companion of the Order of the Bath; Commander of the Order of the British Empire

Air Vice Marshal Robert John Honey, CB, CBE is a former senior commander in the Royal Air Force. He served as Air Secretary from 1989 until his retirement in 1994.

== RAF career ==
Honey was commissioned as an acting pilot officer in the General Duties branch in January 1955. He was promoted to flight lieutenant in 1961, and became officer commanding of No. 228 Operational Conversion Unit RAF in 1971 and then later station commander of RAF Coltishall in 1976. He was appointed Senior Air Staff Officer at Headquarters No. 1 Group in 1984 and Deputy Commander of RAF Germany in 1987. He succeeded Air Vice Marshal Tony Mason as Air Secretary on 10 February 1989, before retiring in 1994.

== Later life ==
In retirement, Honey became Worcestershire County President of the Royal British Legion.

Military offices
Preceded by Tony Mason	Air Secretary; 1989–1994	Succeeded by Robert O'Brien
