= Peter Ruddock =

British Royal Air Force air marshal from Ireland

- Born: 5 February 1954 (age 72); Carlow, Ireland
- Military career
- Allegiance: United Kingdom
- Branch: Royal Air Force
- Service years: 1974–2011
- Rank: Air Marshal
- Commands: RAF Coningsby
- Conflicts: War in Afghanistan; Iraq War
- Awards: Companion of the Order of the Bath; Commander of the Order of the British Empire; Officer of the Legion of Merit (United States)

Air Marshal Peter William David Ruddock, CB, CBE (born 5 February 1954) is a former senior commander in the Royal Air Force who served as Air Secretary from 2004 to 2006.

== RAF career ==
Ruddock joined the Royal Air Force in 1974. He was appointed Officer Commanding the Operations Wing at RAF Coningsby in 1993, assistant director of the Defence Intelligence Staff in 1996, Station Commander at RAF Coningsby in 1999 and then Air Commodore Defensive Operations at Headquarters No. 1 Group in 2000. He became Director of Staff Duties in 2002 and Air Secretary in 2004 before moving on to be Director-General of the Saudi Arabia Armed Forces Project in 2006.

He retired in 2011 and became Business Development Director at Lockheed Martin UK.

Military offices
Preceded by Graham Miller	Air Secretary; 2004–2006	Succeeded by Simon Bryant
