= Matthew Wiles =

Royal Air Force air marshals

- Born: 1961 (age 64–65)
- Military career
- Allegiance: United Kingdom
- Branch: Royal Air Force
- Service years: 1979–2013
- Rank: Air vice-marshal
- Conflicts: War in Afghanistan
- Awards: Companion of the Order of the Bath; Commander of the Order of the British Empire

Air Vice-Marshal Matthew John Gethin Wiles, CB, CBE (born 1961) is a retired senior commander in the Royal Air Force who served as the Air Secretary from 2011 to 2013.

== RAF career ==
Wiles was commissioned into the Royal Air Force as a flying officer in 1979. He served as Assistant Chief of Staff for Personnel and Logistics at Permanent Joint Headquarters and then went on to be Director General of the Joint Supply Chain at Defence Equipment and Support in 2008. He was appointed a Commander of the Order of the British Empire in the 2008 New Year Honours before he became Air Secretary in September 2011. He was appointed a Companion of the Order of the Bath in the 2013 Birthday Honours.

Wiles was appointed Honorary Air Commodore of No. 4624 (County of Oxford) Movements Squadron Royal Auxiliary Air Force for a three year period June 2026 to May 2029.

Military offices
| Preceded by Mike Lloyd | Chief of Staff Personnel and Air Secretary; 2011–2013 | Succeeded by David Stubbs |
