= Geoffrey Dhenin =

Royal Air Force air marshal

Sir Geoffrey Dhenin
- Born: 4 April 1918; Bridgend, Glamorgan, Wales
- Died: 6 May 2011 (aged 93)
- Military career
- Allegiance: United Kingdom
- Branch: Royal Air Force
- Service years: 1943–1978
- Rank: Air Marshal
- Service number: 138384
- Commands: RAF Medical Services
- Conflicts: Second World War; Cold War
- Awards: Knight Commander of the Order of the British Empire; Air Force Cross & Bar; George Medal; Commander of the Order of St John; Mentioned in Despatches

Air Marshal Sir Geoffrey Howard Dhenin, KBE, AFC & Bar, GM, CStJ (2 April 1918 – 6 May 2011) was a British physician and senior Royal Air Force officer. From 1974 to 1978, he served as Director General of the RAF Medical Services.

== Early life and education ==
Dhenin was born on 4 April 1918, three days after the formation of the Royal Air Force, in Bridgend, Glamorgan, Wales. He was educated at Hereford Cathedral School, then an all-boys grammar school in Hereford, Herefordshire. Having won a scholarship, he studied Natural Sciences at St John's College, Cambridge. He then continued his studies at Guy's Hospital Medical School, and qualified as a medical doctor.

In the 1950s, Dhenin undertook research for a Doctor of Medicine (MD) degree at the University of Cambridge. His doctoral thesis was titled "Radiation hazards in aviation", and was completed in 1956.

== Military career ==
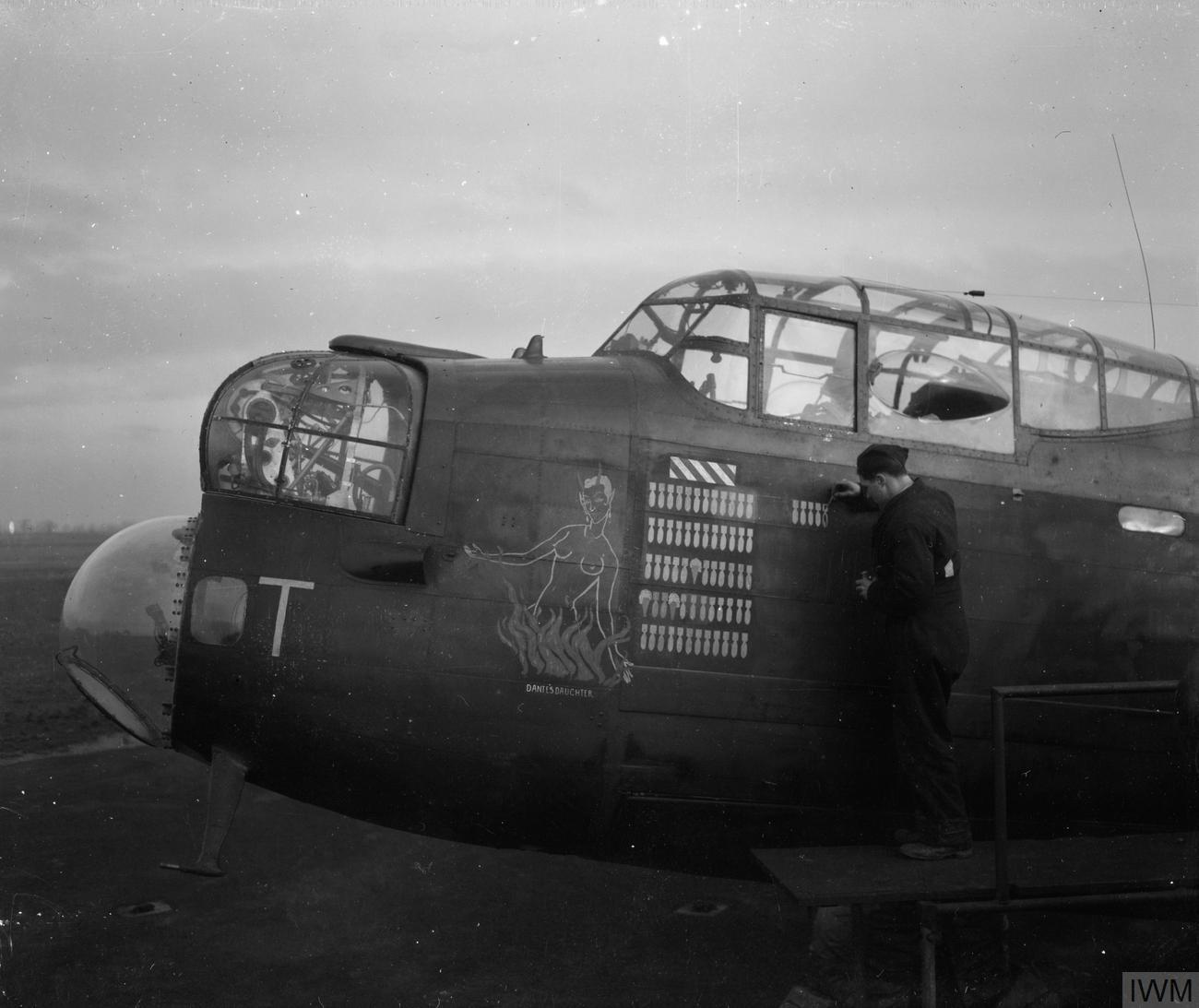
166 Squadron's "Dante's Daughter" at RAF Kirmington, February 1943

On 11 February 1943, Dhenin was commissioned into the Medical Branch of the Royal Air Force Volunteer Reserve as a flying officer (emergency). He was then appointed the medical officer of No. 166 Squadron RAF, an Avro Lancaster bomber squadron that was based at RAF Kirmington. During his time at Kirmington, he was awarded the George Medal for a rescuing an airman from a burning wreck in October 1943. On 8 June 1944, two days after D-Day, he transferred to a mobile field hospital. Based in Normandy, France, he was tasked with evacuating casualties by air from the campaign across North-West Europe.

On 1 September 1945, after the end of the Second World War, Dhenin transferred to the Medical Branch of the Royal Air Force as a flight lieutenant.

As part of the half-yearly promotions, he was promoted to air commodore (one star rank) on 1 January 1967.

== Honours ==
On 14 January 1944, Dhenin was awarded the George Medal (GM), the second highest civil decoration of the UK, for rescuing an airman from a crashed and burning bomber. In the 1954 New Year Honours, he was awarded an Air Force Cross (AFC) for flying a plane into the mushroom cloud of the first British nuclear bomb test in Australia in 1953. In the 1959 Queen's Birthday Honours, he was awarded a bar to his Air Force Cross (i.e. he was awarded the AFC for a second time). In November 1974, he was appointed a Commander of the Order of St John (CStJ). In the 1975 New Year Honours, he was knighted as a Knight Commander of the Order of the British Empire (KBE).

One night in October, 1943, an aircraft, which had sustained damage during an attack against Hanover, crashed near an airfield. The aircraft disintegrated on impact and immediately burst into flames. The rear gunner was injured and trapped in his crushed turret, being pinned down by the remains of the tail unit and the rear of the fuselage. A high explosive bomb was in the blazing wreckage some 10 yards away from the gunner. Flying Officer Dhenin, the station medical officer, and Corporal Lush, a gunner, hastened to the scene of the accident. Although fully aware that the heat might cause the bomb to detonate at any moment Flying Officer Dhenin worked for over half an hour to relieve the injured airman's pain and, assisted by Corporal Lush, endeavoured to release him. Their efforts to extricate the gunner were, however, unavailing. A mobile crane was brought to the scene and the mass of wreckage was lifted clear of the ground. Displaying complete disregard for his own safety, Flying Officer Dhenin then crawled under the wreckage and released the trapped airman thereby enabling others helpers to drag him to safety. Flying Officer Dhenin and Corporal Lush showed fine courage and determination in circumstances of great danger.

— The citation for his George Medal

== Personal life ==
Dhenin married Evelyn in 1946. She died in 1996. He married Syvia in 2002.
