= Neville Stack =

Royal Air Force Air Chief Marshal (1919–1994)

Air Chief Marshal Sir Neville Stack KCB CVO CBE AFC
- Born: 19 October 1919
- Died: 26 January 1994 (aged 74); London, England
- Military career
- Allegiance: United Kingdom
- Branch: Royal Air Force
- Service years: 1935–1978
- Rank: Air Chief Marshal
- Commands: Air Secretary (1976–78); RAF Training Command (1972–76); RAF College Cranwell (1967–70)
- Conflicts: Second World War
- Awards: Knight Commander of the Order of the Bath; Commander of the Royal Victorian Order; Commander of the Order of the British Empire; Air Force Cross; Mentioned in Despatches; Knight of the Order of Leopold with Palms (Belgium); Croix de guerre (Belgium)
- Other work: Gentleman Usher

Air Chief Marshal Sir Thomas Neville Stack, KCB, CVO, CBE, AFC (19 October 1919 – 26 January 1994) was a senior Royal Air Force commander.

== Early life ==
Stack was born on 19 October 1919, the son of aviation pioneer T. Neville Stack. He joined the Royal Air Force in 1935 as a flight cadet at RAF College Cranwell. He gained a permanent commission on 29 July 1939 and passed out of the college with the Sword of Honour. He spent his war service with Coastal Command serving on flying boats until transferring to Transport Command in the late 1950s including a tour as Deputy Captain of the Queen's Flight.

== Air Staff officer ==
In 1967 Stack became commandant of the RAF College Cranwell before moving on in 1970 as a representative with CENTO. In December 1972 he was appointed as Air Officer Commanding-in-Chief of Training Command then moved in the same role at RAF Strike Command. Between 1976 and 1978 he was Air ADC to the Queen. From February 1976 he was Air Secretary before he retired at his own request in 1978.

== Civil life ==
On retirement from the air force, Stack became a Gentleman Usher to the Queen and from 1989 Extra Gentleman Usher. He also became a Freeman of the City of London. Stack died in London on 26 January 1994, aged 74.

== Notes ==
Military offices
Preceded by Ian Lawson	Commandant Royal Air Force College Cranwell; 1967–1970	Succeeded by Desmond Hughes
Preceded by Sir Leslie Mavor	Commander-in-Chief Training Command; 1972–1976	Succeeded by Sir Rex Roe
Preceded by Sir Derek Hodgkinson	Air Secretary; 1976–1978	Vacant Title next held by Barry Duxbury
