= Tap Jones =

Royal Air Force air marshals

Air Marshal Sir Edward Jones KCB CBE DSO DFC
- Born: 31 August 1914; Widnes, Lancashire, England
- Died: 20 February 2007 (aged 92)
- Military career
- Allegiance: United Kingdom
- Branch: Royal Air Force
- Service years: 1935–1969
- Rank: Air Marshal
- Nickname: "Tap"
- Commands: Near East Air Force (1966–69); British Forces Cyprus (1966–69); RAF Malta (1965–66); RAF Germany (1961–63); Central Reconnaissance Establishment (1959–60); RAF Wyton (1957–58); RAF Valley (c.1951–53); No. 121 Wing (1944–45); RAF Hawkinge (1942–43); No. 80 Squadron (1940–41)
- Conflicts: Second World War; Suez Crisis
- Awards: Knight Commander of the Order of the Bath; Commander of the Order of the British Empire; Distinguished Service Order; Distinguished Flying Cross; Mentioned in Despatches; Flying Cross (Greece); Commander of the Order of Orange-Nassau (Netherlands)

Air Marshal Sir Edward Gordon "Tap" Jones, KCB, CBE, DSO, DFC (31 August 1914 – 20 February 2007) was an officer in the Royal Air Force for 34 years, from 1935 to 1969. He commanded a squadron of obsolescent biplane Gladiator fighters during the Greek Campaign in the Second World War, where he shot down five Italian Fiat CR.42 fighters. He served in mainly operational posts in Europe until he retired. Unusually, he never served a post in the Air Ministry or the UK Ministry of Defence.

== Early life ==
Jones was born in Widnes, Lancashire (now Cheshire), the third of four sons of Lieutenant Colonel Albert Jones. His father was the borough medical officer. Jones spent time in India as a child, where his brothers nicknamed him "Doolally Tap" (meaning "slightly mad"). He retained the nickname "Tap" for the rest of his life.

After grammar school, he studied medicine at Liverpool University, where he met his future wife. His three brothers all became doctors, like their father, but Jones soon switched to veterinary science. He was a keen sportsman, representing the university and Lancashire at rugby union. He also enjoyed shooting and the outdoor life, but he showed little interest in his studies.

== Royal Air Force ==
Edward joined the RAF in 1935. He trained as a pilot at Netheravon and joined "B" Flight of No. 17 Squadron in Kenley, flying Gauntlet fighters. In March 1937 the flight was detached to form No. 80 Squadron which flew the Gladiator, the RAF's last biplane fighter. As a pilot officer, he was its adjutant from May 1937. He also played rugby for the RAF.

Promoted to flying officer, his squadron deployed to Egypt in April 1938. He became commander of "A" Flight of No. 80 Squadron in March 1940, while he was based in Amriya in Egypt.

=== Second World War ===
After Italy declared war on the United Kingdom and France on 10 June 1940, Jones took charge of a flight armed with modern Hurricane fighters. He took charge of a flight of Gladiator when it moved to Trikala in central Greece in November 1940. He was in action within days, engaging a formation of more modern Fiat CR.42 fighters, also biplanes, of the Italian Regia Aeronautica to the north of Ioannina. He shot down one on 27 November, then two more the next day over Delvinakion, but was injured in the dogfight and spent a month recovering from a bullet wound in his neck. He returned to duty on 21 December, and took command of No. 80 Squadron on 27 December, after its commander, Squadron Leader Bill Hickey, was killed in action.

Jones shot down two further Fiats on 28 February 1941, and was awarded an immediate Distinguished Flying Cross. He also received a Flying Cross from the Greek government.

After leave in Egypt, Jones returned to No. 80 Squadron. It had been re-equipped with modern Hurricane fighters shortly before Germany invaded Greece on 6 April 1941. His battered squadron withdrew to Crete, then back to Egypt. Finally, it moved to RAF Aqir in Palestine to regroup, where it fought against the Vichy French in Syria. He left No. 80 Squadron in 1942, and was awarded the Distinguished Service Order.

He spent a year with the Rhodesian Air Training Group, then took command of the RAF Hawkinge in Kent. After qualifying at the Army Staff College he was promoted to Acting Group Captain in May 1943, and joined the staff preparing tactical fighter operations for D-Day. His group, No. 83 Group, transferred to France shortly after D-Day, and moved eastwards with the front line. He stayed with the Group during the whole campaign in Northwest Europe as Group Captain Operations and being appointed an Officer of the Order of the British Empire in December 1944, when he returned to operational duties, taking command of No. 121 Wing with its four squadrons of Typhoon fighters, based at Volkel in the Netherlands. He was appointed a Commander of the Dutch Order of Orange-Nassau in 1945.

== Post-war career ==
Jones had a succession of mainly operational appointments in Europe after the War. Unusually, he never served a post in the Air Ministry or the Ministry of Defence.

He served at the School of Land/Air Warfare and commanded No. 2 Wing, No. 1 Initial Training School at RAF Jurby following which he commanded No. 202 Advanced Flying School at RAF Valley, Anglesey. He was appointed a Commander of the Order of the British Empire in 1956. He served at the Headquarters of the Second Tactical Air Force and with the Air Task Force during the Suez Crisis. He took command of RAF Wyton in 1957, the home base of the RAF's strategic reconnaissance forces.

He was promoted to acting air commodore in January 1959, and took command of the Central Reconnaissance Establishment. He was appointed a Companion of the Order of the Bath in 1960. He commanded RAF forces in Germany from 1961 to 1963, then spent two years as Senior RAF Officer at the Imperial Defence College. He took command of air forces in Malta as Deputy Commander-in-Chief (Air) of Allied Forces in the Mediterranean in 1965.

He was promoted to air marshal in November 1966, and took up the position of Air Officer Commanding-in-Chief Near East Air Force (including responsibility for British Forces Cyprus and Administration of the Sovereign Base Areas). He was advanced to Knight Commander of the Order of the Bath in 1967, and retired from the RAF in August 1969.

He continued to enjoy sport in his retirement.

== Family ==
He married Margery Thurston Hatfield in 1938. His wife died in 2002. He was survived by their two sons.

Military offices
Preceded by Sir Thomas Prickett	Commander-in-Chief Near East Air Force; Commander British Forces Cyprus; 1966–1969	Succeeded by Sir Denis Smallwood
