= Leslie Mavor =

Royal Air Force Air Marshal (1916-1991)

Leslie Deane Mavor
- Born: 18 January 1916; Aberdeen, Scotland
- Died: 2 October 1991 (aged 75); York, England
- Military career
- Allegiance: United Kingdom
- Branch: Royal Air Force
- Service years: 1935–1973
- Rank: Air marshal
- Commands: Training Command (1969–72); 38 Group (1964–66); RAF Lindholme (1959–61)
- Conflicts: Second World War
- Awards: Knight Commander of the Order of the Bath; Air Force Cross
- Other work: Deputy Lieutenant of North Yorkshire

Air Marshal Sir Leslie Deane Mavor, KCB, AFC, OStJ, FRAeS, DL (18 January 1916 – 2 October 1991) was a senior Royal Air Force officer.

== RAF career ==
Educated in Aberdeen, Mavor joined the Royal Air Force in 1935. He was trained at the School of Army Co-operation and was then posted to No 31 Squadron, which at the time was based in Lahore in India. In 1942, during the Second World War, Mavor received the Air Force Cross for Army Co-Operation and Transport operations which he performed with his squadron in India, the Middle East and Burma. In 1959 he became Station Commander at RAF Lindholme and in 1961 he became Director of Air Staff Briefing at the Air Ministry. In 1964 attended the Imperial Defence College and on graduation he became Air Officer Commanding No 38 Group. In 1966 he was moved to Assistant Chief of the Air Staff (Policy). On promotion to air marshal in 1969 he was appointed Air Officer Commanding-in-Chief Training Command and he retired on 18 January 1973.

Mavor was appointed Principal of the Home Office Home Defence College. Retiring as Principal in 1980 he continued in the new post of Co-ordinator of Voluntary Effort in Civil Defence until 1984. His appointment reflected a review of Civil preparedness for home defence carried out by the new Conservative Government in 1979 shortly after it was elected.

Mavor was made a Companion of the Order of the Bath on 13 June 1964, appointed an Officer of the Order of St John on 30 January 1966, and knighted as a Knight Commander of the Order of the Bath on 1 January 1970.

He was a Fellow of the Royal Aeronautical Society, and was appointed Deputy Lieutenant of North Yorkshire on 24 May 1976.

Military offices
Preceded by Sir John Davis	Commander-in-Chief Training Command; 1969–1972	Succeeded by Sir Neville Stack
