= David Stubbs (RAF officer) =

Royal Air Force officer

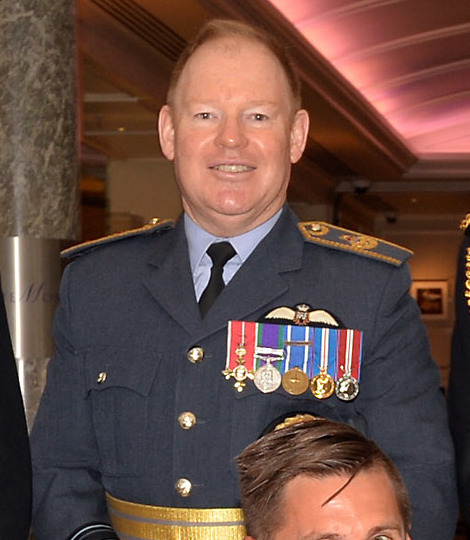
- Air Vice Marshal Stubbs in 2015
- Military career
- Allegiance: United Kingdom
- Branch: Royal Air Force
- Service years: 1981–present
- Rank: Air Vice Marshal
- Commands: Royal Air Force College Cranwell; RAF Aldergrove; No. 28 Squadron
- Awards: Companion of the Order of the Bath; Officer of the Order of the British Empire

Air Vice Marshal David John Stubbs, CB, OBE was a senior Royal Air Force officer. He previously served as the commandant of Royal Air Force College Cranwell from 2012 to 2013, and the air secretary from 2013 to 2016.

== Military career ==
From 2006 to 2008, Stubbs was commanding officer of RAF Aldergrove and the senior RAF officer for Northern Ireland. He served as commandant of Royal Air Force College Cranwell from March 2012 to November 2013. In November 2013, he was appointed Air Secretary.

Stubbs was appointed Companion of the Order of the Bath (CB) in the 2016 Birthday Honours.

== Personal life ==
Stubbs is chairman of the board of trustees of the RAF Club, a gentlemen's club in London.

Military offices
Preceded by Paul Oborn	Commandant of Royal Air Force College Cranwell; 2012–2013	Succeeded by Chris Luck
Preceded by Matthew Wiles	Air Secretary; 2013–2016	Succeeded by Chris Elliot
