= RAF Medical Services =

Medical service of the Royal Air Force

Royal Air Force Medical Services
- Active: 1 April 1918 – Present (following amalgamation of the Royal Flying Corps (RFC) and the Royal Naval Air Service (RNAS))
- Country: United Kingdom
- Allegiance: HM The King
- Branch: Royal Air Force
- Role: Medicine
- Part of: Headquarters Air Command

Commanders
- Head of Royal Air Force Medical Services: Air Commodore Sonia Phythian

Insignia
- RAF Ensign

- Red Cross Emblem

The Royal Air Force Medical Services is the branch of the Royal Air Force that provides health care at home and on deployed operations to RAF service personnel. Medical officers are the doctors of the RAF and have specialist expertise in aviation medicine to support aircrew and their protective equipment. Medical officers also carry out Aeromedical evacuations, providing vital assistance on search-and-rescue missions or emergency relief flights worldwide.

== Personnel and training ==
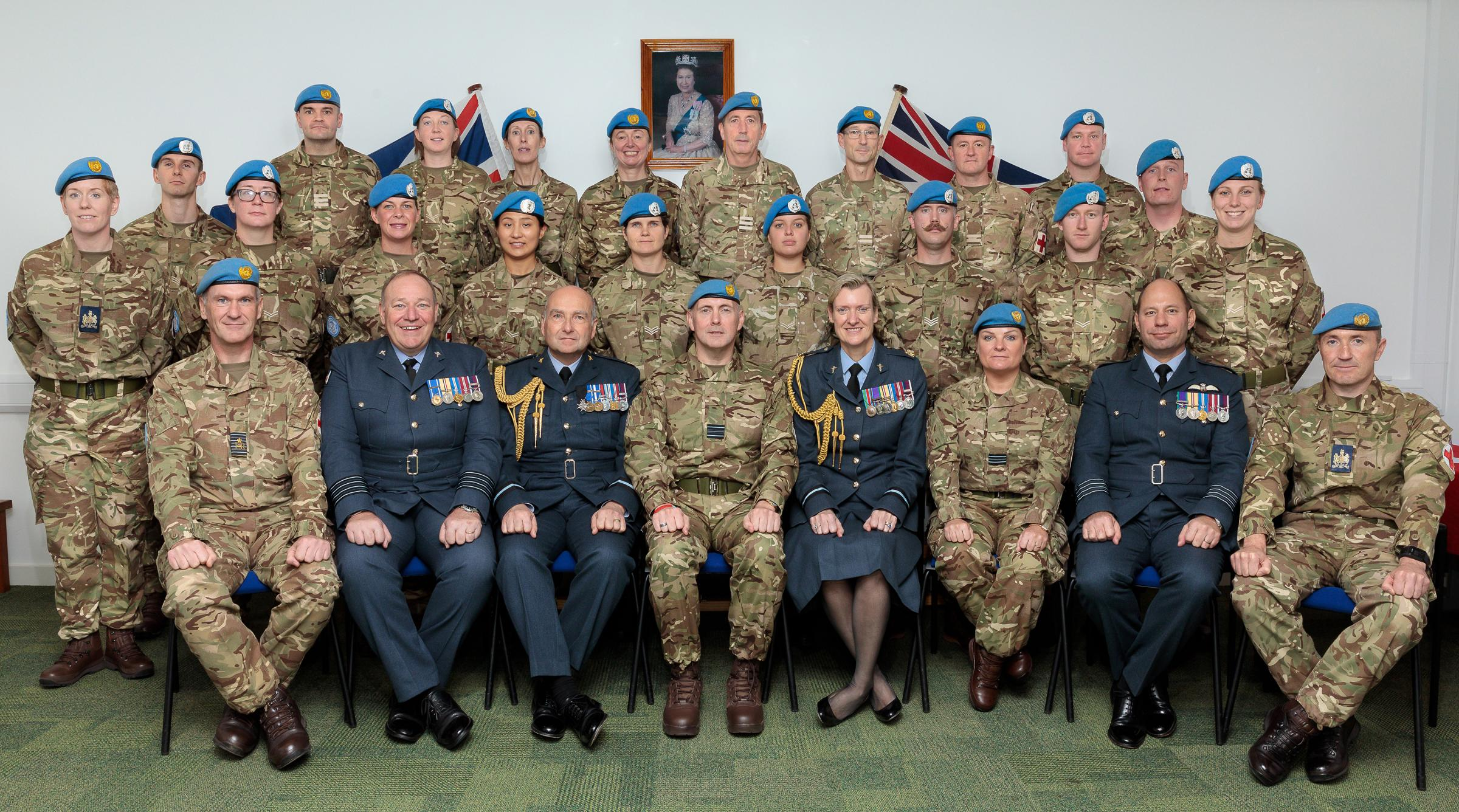
RAF medics who had served on Operation Trenton alongside the United Nations

The Royal Air Force Medical Services employs service members trained only by the RAF, as well as professionals trained by the NHS such as doctors and nurses.

Both officers and aircrew are present within the Medical Services. Roles requiring specialist degrees such as Medical Officers (Doctors), Nursing Officers, and Dental Officers (Dentists), as well as roles not requiring specialists degrees such as Medical Support Officers, are all commissioned, with most (except general Medical Support Officers) attending a 12 week SOIT (specialist entrant and re-entrant) Initial Officer Training commissioning course. General Medical Support Officers are required to attend the regular format, 24 week IOT commissioning course. For all roles further training occurs as necessary following the relevant IOT course.

Medical Service aircrew are required to attend a 10 week recruit basic training course, after which they receive further training within their role.

== List of Directors-General ==
The head of the medical branch has been titled "Head of the Royal Air Force Medical Services" since 2013. The appointment was previously known as "Director of Medical Services" (1918–1938) and "Director-General Medical of Services (RAF)" (1938–2013).

=== Directors of Medical Services ===
- Major-General M H G Fell (1918–1921) (Later Lieutenant-General Sir M H G Fell)
- Air Vice-Marshal Sir David Munro (1921–1930)
- Air Vice-Marshal Sir J McIntyre (1930–1935)
- Air Vice-Marshal Sir A W Iredell (1935–1938)

=== Directors-General of Medical Services (RAF) ===
- Air Marshal Sir A V J Richardson (1938–1941)
- Air Marshal Sir H E Whittingham (1941–1946)
- Air Marshal Sir A Grant (1946–1948)
- Air Marshal Sir P C Livingston (1948–1951)
- Air Marshal Sir J Mac Kilpatrick (1951–1957)
- Air Marshal Sir P B L Potter (1957–1962)
- Air Marshal Sir R Nelson (1962–1967)
- Air Marshal Sir G R Gunn (1967–1971)
- Air Marshal Sir E Sidey (1971–1974)
- Air Marshal Sir G Dhenin (1974–1978)
- Air Marshal Sir C Soutar (1978–1981)
- Air Marshal Sir D Atkinson (1981–1984)
- Air Marshal Sir J Donald (1984–1986)
- Air Vice-Marshal F C Hurrell (1986–1988)
- Air Vice-Marshal N H Mills (1987–1990) (Later Air Marshal Sir N H Mills and Surgeon General)
- Air Vice-Marshal J M Brook (1991–1994)
- Air Vice-Marshal J A Baird (1994–1997) (Later Air Marshal Sir J A Baird and Surgeon General)
- Air Vice-Marshal C J Sharples (1997–2002)
- Air Vice-Marshal W J Pike (2002–2004)
- Air Vice-Marshal S R C Dougherty (2004–2008)
- Air Vice-Marshal C P A Evans (2008–2009) (Later Air Marshal C P A Evans and Surgeon General)
- Air Vice-Marshal C B Morris (2009–2011)
- Air Vice-Marshal A K Mozumder (2011–2013)

=== Head of Royal Air Force Medical Services ===
- Air Commodore A C Wilcock (2013–2014)
- Air Commodore S C Kilbey (2014–2019)
- Air Commodore M Byford (2019–2020)
- Air Commodore D C McLoughlin (2020–2021)
- Air Commodore D K R Daborn (2021–2022)
- Air Commodore S Phythian (2022– )

== See also ==
- Royal Navy Medical Service
- Army Medical Services
- Combat Medical Technician
- Military medicine
