= Derek Hodgkinson =

Air Chief Marshal Sir Derek Hodgkinson KCB CBE DFC AFC
- Born: William Derek Hodgkinson; 27 December 1917; Prestbury, Cheshire
- Died: 29 January 2010 (aged 92); Hampshire
- Military career
- Allegiance: United Kingdom
- Branch: Royal Air Force
- Service years: 1936–1976
- Rank: Air Chief Marshal
- Nickname: "Big S"
- Unit: No. 220 Squadron
- Commands: Air Secretary (1973–76); Near East Air Force (1970–73); RAF Staff College, Andover (1965–66); RAF St Mawgan (1958–61); No. 240 Squadron (1957–58); No. 210 Squadron (1947–49)
- Conflicts: Second World War
- Awards: Knights Commander of the Order of the Bath; Commander of the Order of the British Empire; Distinguished Flying Cross; Air Force Cross; Mentioned in Despatches

Air Chief Marshal Sir William Derek Hodgkinson, KCB, CBE, DFC, AFC (27 December 1917 – 29 January 2010) was a senior Royal Air Force officer. As a bomber pilot in the Second World War, he was shot down and spent time in Stalag Luft III as "Big S", responsible for the security of the escape committee.

== Early life ==
Born near Prestbury, Cheshire, and educated in Repton, Hodgkinson took a short service commission with the RAF in 1936, first flying the Avro Anson multi-role aircraft for RAF Coastal Command and then the American-built Hudson medium-level bomber with No. 220 Squadron RAF.

== Second World War ==
When war was declared, Hodgkinson was responsible for patrolling the English Channel from Heligoland Bight to Stavanger, which included patrols during the Dunkirk evacuation. Hodgkinson was awarded the Distinguished Flying Cross for shooting down a Heinkel HE115 float plane. He then became an instructor with the Operational Training Unit (OTU), where in 1942, as a squadron leader, Hodkinson was selected to form part of "Bomber" Harris's 1,000 bomber raids over Germany.

The city of Bremen was attacked on the night of 25 June and Hodkinson's Hudson was shot down by a night fighter on the return trip over the Dutch coast. The crew, except Hodgkinson and his navigator were killed. Wounded, Hodgkinson was taken to a hospital as a prisoner of war.

He was later transferred to Stalag Luft III, where he was made responsible for security under the leader of the escape committee "Big X". Stalag Luft III was made famous by the daring mass break-out through tunnels depicted in the film The Great Escape. After several unsuccessful escape attempts, the camp was evacuated ahead of the Russian advance of January 1945 and the prisoners marched 50 miles (80 km) through severe winter weather to the naval PoW camp near Bremen. They were again transferred to Hamburg where they were liberated by the British in April 1945.

== Post-war service ==
After the war, Hodgkinson was appointed Officer Commanding No. 210 Squadron and then joined the Directing Staff at the Australian Joint Anti-Submarine School before becoming Officer Commanding No. 240 Squadron in 1957. He was appointed Station Commander at RAF St Mawgan in Cornwall in 1958 before joining the staff of Lord Louis Mountbatten, then Chief of the Defence Staff, in 1961. Following this, he attended the Imperial Defence College and then became Commandant at the RAF Staff College in 1965 before becoming Assistant Chief of the Air Staff responsible for operational requirements, the role that made him famous for a report detailing the career structure for RAF officers and recommending a meritocracy over the existing class structure, in 1966. Hodgkinson also had a leading role in the development of modern front-line aircraft and equipment, most notably the Panavia Tornado. He went on to be Senior Air Staff Officer at Headquarters Training Command in 1969 and was then appointed as Commander-in-Chief Near East Air Force (including responsibility for British Forces Cyprus and Administration of the Sovereign Base Areas) in 1970 before finishing his career as Air Secretary in 1973 responsible for overseeing cutbacks caused by the withdrawal from the Far East and the Persian Gulf in the 1970s. He retired in May 1976.

== Family ==
In 1939 he married Heather Goodwin; they had a son, Richard born in 1946, and a daughter Elizabeth born in 1949.

Military offices
Preceded by Sir Denis Smallwood	Commander-in-Chief Near East Air Force; Commander British Forces Cyprus; 1970–1973	Succeeded by Sir John Aiken
Preceded by Sir John Barraclough	Air Secretary; 1973–1976	Succeeded by Sir Neville Stack
