= Near East Air Force (Royal Air Force) =

Former command of the Royal Air Force

Royal Air Force Near East Air Force RAF NEAF
- RAF Near East Air Force Command badge
- Active: 1961; 65 years ago–31 March 1976; 50 years ago
- Country: United Kingdom
- Branch: Royal Air Force
- Type: RAF Command
- Headquarters: RAF Episkopi
- Motto: Wings in the Sun

The former Royal Air Force Near East Air Force, more simply known as RAF Near East Air Force (RAF NEAF), was the command (military formation) that ran all Royal Air Force (RAF) operations in the Eastern Mediterranean (the Near East). It existed from 1961 to 1976, but its forebears existed from 1943.

== History ==
The Command was originally formed as RAF Mediterranean and Middle East (MEDME) on 10 December 1943 to control RAF elements in the Eastern Mediterranean under the command of Mediterranean Allied Air Forces. HQ MEDME was originally located at Caserta in Italy, where HQ MAAF had been located, but by October 1945 had moved to Cairo. It originally comprised nine subordinate Air Headquarters (AHQs) and four group headquarters. AHQ Italy had formed at Caserta on 1 October 1945 by renaming Mediterranean Coastal Air Force. No. 212 (Fighter) Group RAF, subordinate to AHQ Egypt, was disbanded on 31 January 1946. AHQ Eastern Mediterranean was absorbed into No. 219 Group RAF on 28 February 1946. As post-war reductions continued, the command was reduced to six AHQs (AHQ Italy at Udine (with Nos 72, 87, 92, 111, 112, 250, 253 Squadrons flying fighters, plus 225 and 654 Squadrons in Italy and Austria), AHQ Iraq, AHQ East Africa, AHQ Greece (under Air Commodore Geoffrey Tuttle in 1944-45), AHQ Levant, AHQ Malta), plus HQ British Forces Aden and No. 205 Group RAF at Heliopolis.

AHQ Italy was closed in October 1947, though 132 Spitfires were gifted to the postwar Italian Air Force. AHQ Greece was closed on 11 January 1947 and No. 55 Squadron RAF (Hassani, Mosquitos) and No. 252 Squadron RAF (Araxos, Beaufighters) disbanded. However, a small RAF mission to the Royal Hellenic Air Force remained, and numbers of Supermarine Spitfires were donated to the Greeks. In Egypt, after the immediate post-war run-down, Nos 6 and 213 Squadrons remained flying Tempests at RAF Shallufa, No. 13 Squadron RAF remained at RAF Fayid flying Mosquitos, and five transport squadrons with Dakotas (Nos 78, 114, 204, 215, and 216) were at RAF Kabrit.

On 31 July 1945, HQ MEDME was expanded to absorb RAF Middle East Command, and on 1 June 1949 it was renamed Middle East Air Force. In May 1948 at Kabrit, No. 215 Squadron was disbanded by being renumbered No. 70 Squadron RAF. 78 Squadron left Kabrit in 1950, and 114 Squadron was not present after 1951. A Special Communication Squadron was formed at Kabrit in January 1951, but disbanded at Fayid in September 1952. No. 78 Squadron RAF converted to Vickers Valettas in April 1950, before being disbanded at RAF Fayid in Egypt on 30 September 1954. In 1955, No. 216 Squadron RAF moved from RAF Fayid in Egypt to RAF Lyneham in Wiltshire, England.

On arrival by ship at Malta in July 1952, No. 78 Wing RAAF, flying Vampires with two additional Meteor Mk.7s, became part of the MEAF. Wing Commander, later Group Captain Brian Eaton commanded the wing. Soon after arrival, the wing came under the Air Officer Commanding Malta. The Wing was at RAF Hal Far (HMS Falcon), and then spent 18 months at RAF Ta Kali, moving there in June 1953. As the RAF had previously vacated the station, Takali was 'run like an RAAF base in Australia'. At the end of 1954, the leased aircraft were handed back to the RAF, and the ships back to Australia left in January 1955. At the same time, No. 14 Squadron RNZAF equipped with sixteen de Havilland Vampire jets in 1952, was based in Cyprus from 1952 to 1955. There is a colourful account of Squadron Leader Max Hope, OC 14 Squadron, being cryptically told that the unit was being deployed to Cyprus by the Chief of the Air Staff via National Geographic Magazine, reported in Bentley's RNZAF - A Short History.

On 1 March 1961, the Southern Group of Middle East Air Force became Near East Air Force, and was based in Cyprus. During 1956, the UK had offered to provide a light bomber wing to the Central Treaty Organisation (CENTO), and with the acceptance of that offer what was originally known as the MEAF Strike Wing was established at Akrotiri in 1957.

During the 1960s, NEAF included the NEAF Strike Wing at RAF Akrotiri (four Canberra strike squadrons and No. 13 Squadron RAF flying Canberra PR Mk7s), No. 3 (LAA) Wing RAF Regiment (Nos 27, 37, 194 Squadrons), No. 70 Squadron RAF at RAF Nicosia flying Hastings, and No. 103 Squadron RAF flying Sycamores. 103 Squadron's Bristol Sycamore HR14 helicopters operated in search and rescue (SAR), casualty evacuation, and internal security roles. There was also HQ No. 5 Wing RAF Regiment, HQ No. 8 Wing RAF Regiment, and three RAF Regiment squadrons at Nicosia (Nos 26, 28, and 34 Squadrons).

No. 103 Squadron was disbanded on 31 July 1963, by breaking the squadron up into Nos. 1563 (at Nicosia) and 1564 (at El Adem) flights. In 1964, No. 29 Squadron RAF arrived in the fighter role, to be replaced in 1967 by No. 56 Squadron RAF. Later, No. 112 Squadron RAF arrived in the surface-to-air missile role. Equipped with Bristol Bloodhounds, the squadron was based at Paramali West, but administered from RAF Episkopi. In 1969, the Canberras were retired, with Nos. 6, 32, 73, and 249 Squadrons were all disbanded on parade on 10 January 1969. They were replaced by 9 and 35 Squadrons flying Avro Vulcans, which arrived respectively in March and January 1969.

With the Turkish invasion of Cyprus in 1974, it was decided that the CENTO nuclear strike role could not be continued from Cyprus, and so in January 1975, 9 and 35 Squadrons were withdrawn back to the UK. All other fixed-wing aircraft also left that same month, with the only flying squadron remaining at Akrotiri being No. 84 Squadron RAF flying Westland Whirlwinds.

The Command was disbanded and replaced by Air Headquarters Cyprus on 31 March 1976.

== Commanders-in-Chief ==
Commanders-in-Chief included:

Commanders-in-Chief RAF Mediterranean and Middle East

- Air Marshal Sir John Slessor (14 January 1944 – 16 March 1945)
- Air Marshal Sir Guy Garrod (16 March 1945 – 1 August 1945)
- Air Marshal Sir Charles Medhurst (1 August 1945 – 1 March 1948)
- Air Marshal Sir William Dickson (1 March 1948 – 23 January 1950)

Commanders-in-Chief Middle East Air Force

- Air Marshal Sir John Baker (23 January 1950 – 7 February 1952)
- Air Marshal Sir Victor Groom (7 February 1952 – 19 May 1952)
- Air Marshal Sir Arthur Sanders (19 May 1952 – 15 October 1953)
- Air Marshal Sir Claude Pelly (15 October 1953 – 24 September 1956)
- Air Marshal Sir Hubert Patch (24 September 1956 – 26 November 1958)
- Air Marshal Sir William MacDonald (26 November 1958 – 16 July 1962)

Commanders-in-Chief Near East Air Force

- Air Marshal Sir Denis Barnett (16 July 1962 – 25 September 1964)
- Air Marshal Sir Thomas Prickett (25 September 1964 – 21 November 1966)
- Air Marshal Sir Edward Gordon Jones (21 November 1966 – 6 May 1969)
- Air Marshal Sir Denis Smallwood (6 May 1969 – 2 February 1970)
- Air Marshal Sir Derek Hodgkinson (2 Feb 1970 – 25 June 1973)
- Air Marshal Sir John Aiken (25 June 1973 – 31 March 1976)

== See also ==
- List of Royal Air Force commands
