= Donald Randell Evans =

Royal Air Force Air Chief Marshal (1912-1975)

Sir Donald Evans
- Born: 31 January 1912; Richmond, Surrey
- Died: 9 April 1975 (aged 63)
- Military career
- Allegiance: United Kingdom
- Branch: Royal Air Force
- Service years: 1930–1970
- Rank: Air Chief Marshal
- Commands: Imperial Defence College (1968–70); Air Secretary (1966–67); Technical Training Command (1964–66); School of Land/Air Warfare (1959–61); Telecommunications Flying Unit (1946–48); Fighter Interception Unit (1941–42)
- Conflicts: Second World War
- Awards: Knight Commander of the Order of the British Empire; Companion of the Order of the Bath; Distinguished Flying Cross; Mentioned in Despatches (2); Bronze Star Medal (United States)

Air Chief Marshal Sir Donald Randell Evans, KBE, CB, DFC (31 January 1912 – 9 April 1975) was a senior Royal Air Force commander who was an innovator in night fighting tactics in the Second World War and conducted the signals planning for the Sicily and Normandy invasions.

== Early life ==
Born the son of Colonel Percy Evans, who had been Assistant Director Medical Services for the British Expeditionary Forces (1915–1917), Evans was educated at Wellington College before entering the RAF College Cranwell in 1930 where he won the Humanities Prize.

== Second World War ==
Following service in the Middle East, Evans joined RAF Fighter Command where he was a signals officer at the outbreak of the Second World War. In 1941, he was given command of the Fighter Interception Unit at Ford and was responsible for introducing successful new tactics. He personally shot down two enemy fighters and was awarded the Distinguished Flying Cross in 1942. At the age of thirty, he was promoted to group captain and went to Headquarters No. 11 (Fighter) Group in charge of night operations. In 1943, he was posted to the Mediterranean where he undertook the air side of signals planning for the Sicily invasion. Later he performed similar duties in the Allied Expeditionary Air Force for the Normandy landings.

== Post-war RAF career ==
After the war he graduated from RAF Staff College, commanded the Telecommunications Flying Unit at Defford from 1946 to 1948 before being put in charge of plans at Headquarters RAF Fighter Command. He became Director of Operational Requirements at the Air Ministry in 1952. In 1957 to 1958 he was Senior Air Staff Officer, Fighter Command, and from 1959 to 1961 commandant of the School of Land-Air Warfare. He was promoted to air vice marshal and appointed Assistant Chief of the Defence Staff at the Ministry of Defence in 1961. An important step was his appointment as Chairman of the Chiefs of Staff working party in the reorganisation of the Ministry of Defence in 1963. As The Times reported, "with an already established reputation as a progressive mind on joint planning he worked closely with the then Chief of the Defence Staff, Lord Mountbatten to try to ensure that unification became a real integration of the policy making functions of the three services, a step resisted at that time by some less flexible senior officers."

In 1964, he was appointed a Knight Commander of the Order of the British Empire, promoted to air chief marshal and assumed the role of Air Officer Commanding-in-Chief at Technical Training Command until 1966 when he became Air Secretary. In 1968 he became the last Commandant of the Imperial Defence College before it was renamed the Royal College of Defence Studies and then retired in 1970.

Upon retirement he became consultant on aviation matters to Ferranti in Edinburgh, Chairman of the Board of Governors at the Star and Garter Home in Richmond, and Chairman of the group advising Lord Dulverton on the creation of the Overlord Embroidery that commemorated the D-Day landings. At the time of his death he was President of "The Old Cranwellian Association".

== Family ==
Evans married first Pauline Breech with whom he had two children, Nigel and Judith and, secondly, Squadron Leader Phillip Hunter's widow, Eleanor with whom he had one son, James.

His funeral took place in Richmond, Surrey before a memorial service at St Clement Danes, The Strand on 9 May 1975. The eulogy was read by the Earl of Bandon with excerpts reported in that year's Old Cranwellian. He described Evans as a man of "courage, humility and integrity interwoven into his character". He also stated that his rise in the Royal Air Force had been the more remarkable because "Donald suffered intolerably from bad health from his early youth, and all through his life".

Military offices
Preceded by Sir Alfred Earle	Air Officer Commanding-in-Chief Technical Training Command; 1964–1966	Succeeded by Sir William Coles
Preceded by Sir William MacDonald	Air Secretary; 1966–1967	Succeeded by Sir Brian Burnett
Preceded by Sir John Anderson	Commandant of the Imperial Defence College; 1968–1970	Succeeded by Alastair Buchan
