= John Barraclough (RAF officer) =

Royal Air Force Air Chief Marshal (1918–2008)

Air Chief Marshal Sir John Barraclough KCB CBE DFC AFC OStJ FRAeS
- Air Chief Marshal Barraclough in 1964
- Born: 2 May 1918
- Died: 10 May 2008 (aged 90)
- Military career
- Allegiance: United Kingdom
- Branch: Royal Air Force
- Service years: 1935–1976
- Rank: Air Chief Marshal
- Commands: Commandant Royal College of Defence Studies (1974–75); Vice-Chief of the Defence Staff (1970–72); No. 19 Group (1964–67); RAF Middleton St. George (1957–58); RAF Biggin Hill (1955–57)
- Conflicts: Second World War
- Awards: Knight Commander of the Order of the Bath; Commander of the Order of the British Empire; Distinguished Flying Cross; Air Force Cross; Mentioned in Despatches; Queen's Commendation for Valuable Service in the Air

Air Chief Marshal Sir John Barraclough KCB, CBE, DFC, AFC, OStJ, FRAeS (2 May 1918 – 10 May 2008) was a Royal Air Force pilot during the Second World War who went on to become Vice-Chief of the Defence Staff.

== Early life ==
Barraclough was born on 2 May 1918. He was educated at Cranbrook School, in Cranbrook, Kent.

== Military career ==
Barraclough joined the Artists Rifles in 1935. He was commissioned into the Royal Air Force in 1938.

Barraclough served in the Second World War flying maritime patrol aircraft. On 29 October 1940, it was gazetted that he was promoted to flying officer on 3 September 1940. However, on 14 January 1941, this was substituted for the granting of the war substantive rank of flying officer back dated to 12 August 1940. He was promoted to war substantive flight lieutenant on 12 August 1941. By February 1943, he was an acting squadron leader and flying with No. 209 Squadron RAF which was stationed in East Africa. On 14 March 1943, he was promoted to flight lieutenant. By the end of 1945, he was an acting wing commander.

He became commanding officer of RAF Biggin Hill in 1955 and of RAF Middleton St. George in 1957. In 1958 he took charge of Operations and Training at Headquarters Far East Air Force.

He became director of public relations for the RAF in 1961 and air officer commanding No. 19 Group RAF in 1964. He then became air officer administration for Bomber Command in 1967 and for Strike Command in 1968. In 1970 he became Vice-Chief of the Defence Staff and in 1972 he was made Air Secretary. His last appointment was as Commandant of the Royal College of Defence Studies in 1974.

He was appointed honorary inspector-general of the Royal Auxiliary Air Force on 1 January 1984.

== Family ==
In 1946 he married Maureen McCormack and they went on to have one daughter.

== Honours and decorations ==
Barraclough was awarded the Distinguished Flying Cross (DFC) on 16 February 1943 "for gallantry and devotion to duty in the execution of air operations". It was gazetted in the 1946 New Year Honours, that he had been Mentioned in Despatches.

He was appointed Companion of the Order of the Bath (CB) in the 1969 New Year Honours.

- Knight Commander of the Order of the Bath – 13 June 1970
- Commander of the Order of the British Empire – 10 June 1961
- Distinguished Flying Cross – 16 February 1943
- Air Force Cross – 1941
- Officer of the Venerable Order of Saint John – 1985
- Queen's Commendation for Valuable Service in the Air – 1 June 1953
- Mentioned in Despatches – 1 January 1946
- Fellow of the Royal Aeronautical Society
- Fellow of the Royal Society of Arts
- FIPM
- FBIM (MBIM)
- FIPR (MIPR)
- Member of the Bath and County Club

Military offices
Preceded by Sir Ian Hogg	Vice-Chief of the Defence Staff; 1970–1972	Succeeded by Sir John Gibbon
Preceded by Sir Gareth Clayton	Air Secretary; 1972–1973	Succeeded by Sir Derek Hodgkinson
Preceded by Sir Antony Read	Commandant of the Royal College of Defence Studies; 1974–1975	Succeeded by Sir Ian Easton
Court offices
Preceded by Sir Desmond Dreyer	Gentleman Usher to the Sword of State; 1980–1988	Succeeded by Sir Edward Burgess
