= Simon Edwards (RAF officer) =

RAF officer

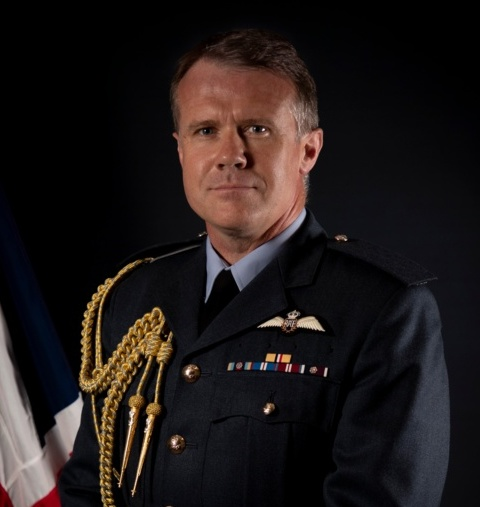
- Education: Joint Services Command and Staff College; Royal College of Defence Studies
- Military career
- Allegiance: United Kingdom
- Branch: Royal Air Force
- Service years: 1990–present
- Rank: Air vice marshal
- Commands: RAF Brize Norton; No. 904 Expeditionary Air Wing; No. 99 Squadron RAF
- Conflicts: Iraq War; War in Afghanistan
- Awards: Companion of the Order of the Bath

Air Vice-Marshal Simon Scott Edwards CB is a senior officer in the Royal Air Force, currently serving as Director People and Air Secretary.

== Education ==
Edwards attended Joint Services Command and Staff College and received a master's degree in Defence Studies. In 2017 he graduated from the Royal College of Defence Studies and won the Bon Oeuf trophy.

== RAF career ==
Edwards joined the Royal Air Force in 1990. He was promoted to squadron leader in 2001 and was posted to Air Command. Edwards flew C17s for No. 99 Squadron RAF. In 2005 he was promoted to wing commander. He worked for the Ministry of Defence in 2006. He was then chosen to return No. 99 Squadron RAF and became the commanding officer of the squadron.

Edwards was promoted to air commodore and appointed Assistant Chief of Staff Capability Delivery, Air Mobility & Air Enablers, Headquarters Air Command in July 2018. In May 2021, he was promoted to air vice-marshal and became Assistant Chief of the Air Staff, and, in August 2023, he became Director People and Air Secretary.

Edwards was appointed a Companion of the Order of the Bath (CB) in the 2025 New Year Honours.

=== Ribbon bar ===
Military offices
Preceded by Ian Gale	Assistant Chief of the Air Staff; 2021–2023	Succeeded by Tim Jones
Preceded by Maria Byford	Air Secretary; 2023–present	Incumbent
