= John Aiken (RAF officer) =

Royal Air Force air marshal (1921–2005)

Air Chief Marshal Sir John Aiken KCB
- Born: 22 December 1921; Belfast, Northern Ireland
- Died: 31 May 2005 (aged 83); Westminster, London, England
- Military career
- Allegiance: United Kingdom
- Branch: Royal Air Force
- Service years: 1940–78
- Rank: Air Chief Marshal
- Commands: Air Member for Personnel (1976–78); British Forces Cyprus (1973–76); Near East Air Force (1973–76); RAF Finningley (1963–64); No. 29 Squadron RAF (1956–58); Birmingham University Air Squadron (1950–53)
- Conflicts: Second World War; Turkish invasion of Cyprus
- Awards: Knight Commander of the Order of the Bath

Air Chief Marshal Sir John Alexander Carlisle Aiken, KCB (22 December 1921 – 31 May 2005) was a senior Royal Air Force (RAF) officer, and the Commander of British forces in Cyprus at the time of the Turkish invasion of the island in 1974.

== RAF career ==
Educated at Birkenhead School, Aitken joined the Royal Air Force in 1941, serving in the Second World War in North-West Europe, flying Spitfires with No. 611 Squadron from 1942 and in the Far East as a flight commander with No. 548 Squadron flying Spitfires out of Darwin from 1944.

In 1948 he became an instructor at the RAF College Cranwell before becoming Officer Commanding Birmingham University Air Squadron in 1950. He was made Personal Staff Officer to the Air Officer Commanding-in-Chief at Fighter Command in 1954, Officer Commanding No. 29 Squadron in 1956 and a Staff Officer at Headquarters Allied Forces Northern Europe in 1958. He went on to be deputy director, Intelligence (Air) at the Air Ministry in 1960 before being appointed Station Commander at RAF Finningley in 1962. His next series of appointments were as Air Commodore (Intelligence) at the Ministry of Defence in 1964, Deputy Commander-in-Chief at RAF Germany in 1969 and Director-General of RAF Training in 1971. He was appointed as Commander, British Forces Near East/Air Officer Commanding-in-Chief Near East Air Force; and Administrator British Sovereign Base Areas, Cyprus, on 25 June 1973. He remained there throughout the period of the Turkish invasion of Cyprus, during which time he was responsible for organising the evacuation of several thousand foreign nationals from Nicosia and Limassol. He returned to the UK in 1976 and became Air Member for Personnel. He retired in March 1978. On retirement, he was appointed Director General of Intelligence at the Ministry of Defence from 1978 to 1981. He was President of the Royal Air Forces Association from 1984 to 1985, and 1987–88.

Aiken was appointed a Companion of the Order of the Bath in 1967, and raised to Knight Commander of the Order in 1973. He died on 31 May 2005, aged 83.

== Family ==
In 1948 he married Pamela Bartlett; they had a son and a daughter.

Military offices
| Preceded by Sir Derek Hodgkinson | Commander-in-Chief Near East Air Force; 1973–1976 | Post disbanded |
| Preceded by Sir Derek Hodgkinson | Commander British Forces Near East; 1973–1976 | Succeeded by Roy Austen-Smith |
| Preceded by Sir Neil Cameron | Air Member for Personnel; 1976–1978 | Succeeded by Sir John Gingell |
Government offices
| Preceded by Sir David Willison | Director-General Intelligence; 1978–1981 | Succeeded by Sir Roy Halliday |
