= Denis Barnett =

New Zealand-British Royal Air Force Air Marshal (1906–1992)

Air Chief Marshal Sir Denis Barnett GCB CBE DFC
- Air Chief Marshal Barnett in 1962
- Born: 11 February 1906; Dunedin, New Zealand
- Died: 31 December 1992 (aged 86)
- Military career
- Allegiance: United Kingdom
- Branch: Royal Air Force
- Service years: 1929–1964
- Rank: Air Chief Marshal
- Commands: Near East Air Force (1962–64); British Forces Cyprus (1962–64); Transport Command (1959–62); Air Secretary (1957–59); RAF Staff College, Bracknell (1956); No. 205 Group (1954–56); Central Bomber Establishment (1949); RAF Swanton Morley (1942–43); No. 40 Squadron (1940); No. 84 Squadron (1938)
- Conflicts: Second World War; Suez Crisis
- Awards: Knight Grand Cross of the Order of the Bath; Commander of the Order of the British Empire; Distinguished Flying Cross; Mentioned in Despatches; Commander of the Legion of Merit (United States); Commander of the Legion of Honour (France); Croix de guerre (France)

Air Chief Marshal Sir Denis Hensley Fulton Barnett, GCB, CBE, DFC (11 February 1906 – 31 December 1992) was a squadron commander and senior officer in the Royal Air Force during the Second World War. In the post war years he held high command, serving as the British air commander during the Suez War and subsequently the Air Officer Commanding-in-Chief Transport Command and the Commander of British Forces Cyprus.

== Personal life ==
Barnett was born in Dunedin, New Zealand, his parents being Sir Louis Barnett and Mabel Violet Barnett née Fulton (daughter of Catherine Fulton and James Fulton). He had three elder brothers, including Miles Barnett, and an older sister. He married Pamela Grant on 22 April 1939, and they went on to have three daughters and one son.

== RAF career ==
The New Zealander Barnett was commissioned into the Royal Air Force (RAF) in 1929. He was appointed Officer Commanding No. 84 Squadron in 1938 and then served in the Second World War, taking charge of No. 40 Squadron in June 1940. He joined the Air Staff at Headquarters Bomber Command in 1941 and then became station commander at RAF Swanton Morley in 1942. He returned to Bomber Command in June 1943, taking on the roles of Deputy Director of Operations, then Senior Air Staff Officer and finally Director of Operations.

After the war Barnett joined the Air Staff in India and then became commandant of the Central Bomber Establishment in 1949 before becoming Director of Operations at the Air Ministry in 1950. He became UK Representative at the United Nations Command Headquarters in Tokyo in 1952, Air Officer Commanding No. 205 Group in 1954 and commandant of the RAF Staff College, Bracknell, in 1956. With the Suez Crisis unfolding in later that year, he became commander of the Allied Air Task Force for Operation Musketeer and ordered to carry out the bombing Egyptian airfields in order to achieve air superiority.

Barnett returned to the United Kingdom as Air Secretary in 1957. His final appointments were as Air Officer Commanding-in-Chief Transport Command in 1959 and Air Officer Commanding-in-Chief RAF Near East Air Force (including responsibility for British Forces Cyprus and Administration of the Sovereign Base Areas) in 1962 before retiring in 1964.

In retirement he became Board Member for Weapons Research & Development at the Atomic Energy Authority.

Military offices
Preceded by Douglas Macfadyen	Commandant of the RAF Staff College, Bracknell; April – August 1956	Succeeded by Roy Faville
Unknown	Air Secretary; 1957–1959	Succeeded by Sir Theodore McEvoy
Preceded by Sir Andrew McKee	Commander-in-Chief Transport Command; 1959–1962	Succeeded by Sir Edmund Hudleston
Preceded by Sir William MacDonald	Commander-in-Chief RAF Near East Air Force; Commander British Forces Cyprus; 1962–1964	Succeeded by Sir Thomas Prickett
