= Brian Burnett =

Royal Air Force Air Chief Marshal (1913-2011)

Sir Brian Burnett
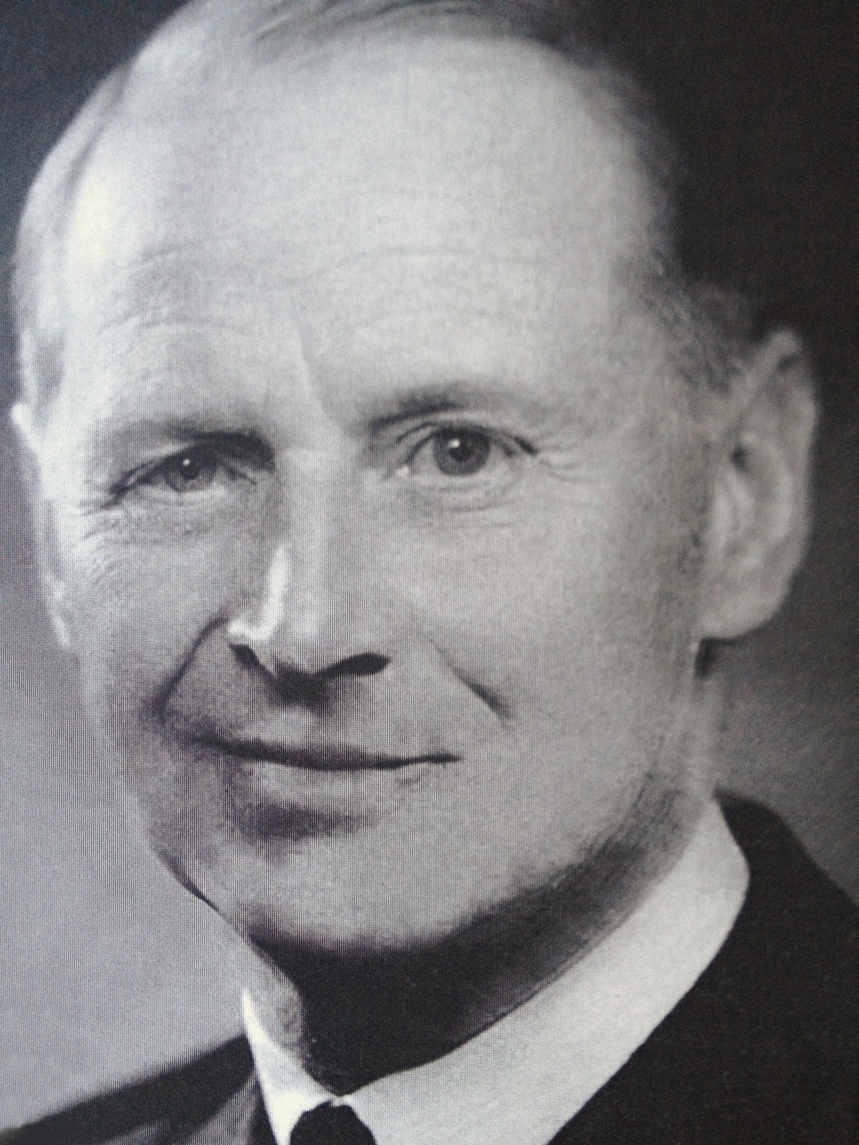
- Sir Brian Burnett
- Born: 10 March 1913; Hyderabad, India
- Died: 16 September 2011 (aged 98); Surrey, England
- Military career
- Allegiance: United Kingdom
- Branch: Royal Air Force
- Service years: 1932–72
- Rank: Air Chief Marshal
- Commands: Far East Command (1970–72); Air Secretary (1967–70); Vice-Chief of the Air Staff (1964–67); No. 3 Group (1961–64); RAF Gaydon (1954–56); No. 33 Air Navigation School (1942–44); No. 51 Whitley Squadron (1941)
- Conflicts: Second World War
- Awards: Knight Grand Cross of the Order of the Bath; Distinguished Flying Cross; Air Force Cross

Air Chief Marshal Sir Brian Kenyon Burnett, GCB, DFC, AFC (10 March 1913 – 16 September 2011) was a British senior Royal Air Force officer who became Air Secretary and served as the last Commander-in-Chief of Far East Command.

== Early life ==
The grandson of Ernest Burnett, Burnett was born in Hyderabad in India, where his father was principal of Nizam College. He was educated at Charterhouse School, Heidelberg University and Wadham College in Oxford.

== RAF career ==
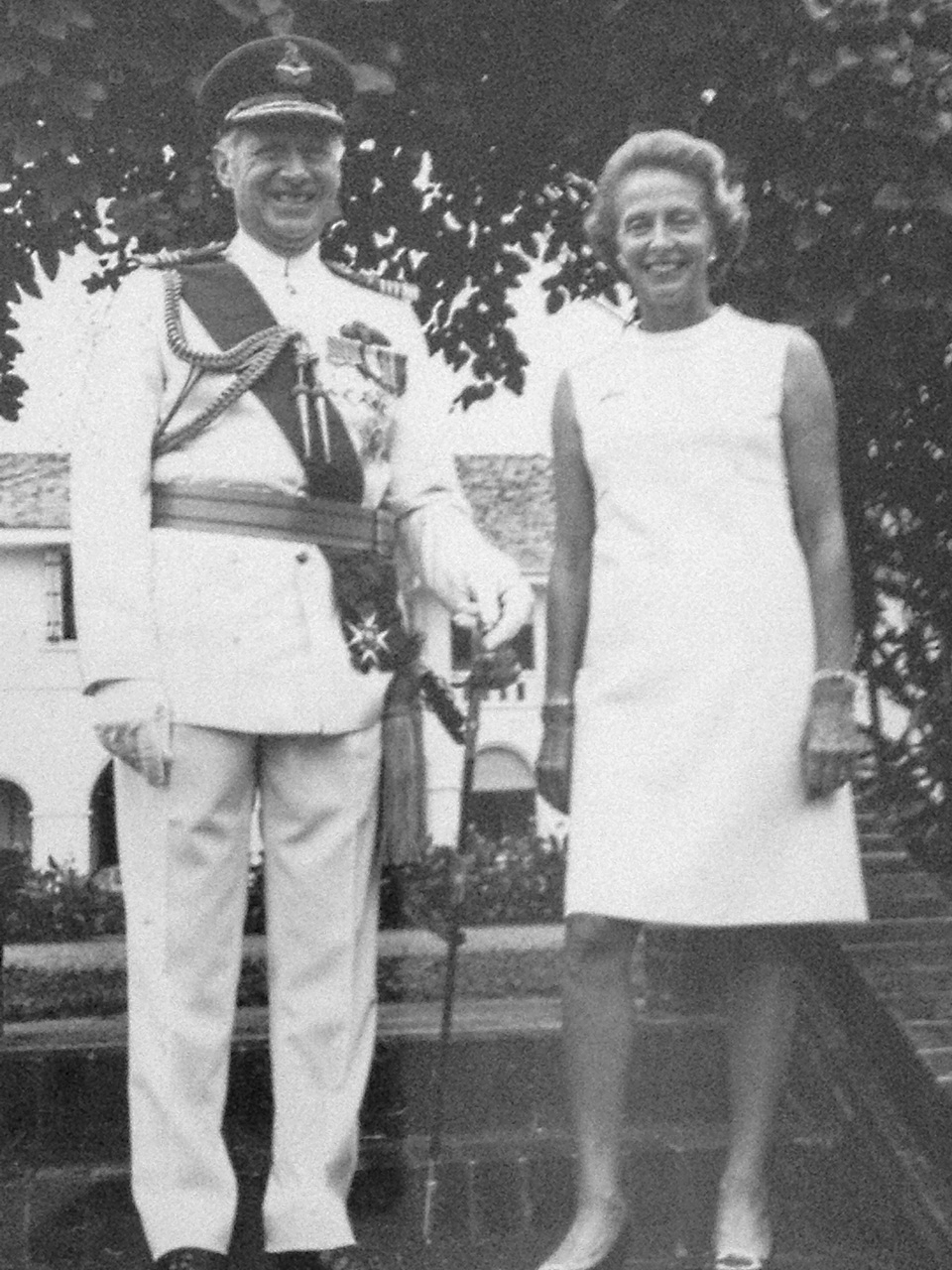
Commander-in-Chief Far East Command Brian Burnett on the steps of Command House, Singapore with Lady Valerie Burnett

Burnett joined the Reserve of Air Force Officers in 1932 and transferred to the RAF in 1934. Burnett's name came to prominence in 1938, when he was the navigator and second pilot of a Wellesley bomber that completed a record-breaking non-stop flight of 7,158 miles from Ismailia in Egypt to Darwin, Northern Territory, Australia, for which Burnett was awarded the AFC.

He served in World War II as Commander of No. 51 Whitley Squadron and then as Commander of No. 33 Air Navigation School in Canada before becoming Senior Air Staff Officer at Headquarters No. 25 Group in 1944.

After the war he became an instructor at the RAF Staff College, Bracknell and then joined the UN Military Staff Committee in New York. He served on the Joint Planning Staff at the Air Ministry from 1949 and became Senior Air Staff Officer at Headquarters No. 3 Bomber Group from 1951. He was made Station Commander at the V bomber station RAF Gaydon in 1954, Director of Bombing and Reconnaissance Operations at the Air Ministry in 1956 and Air Officer in charge of Administration at Headquarters RAF Bomber Command in 1959.

He went on to be Air Officer Commanding No. 3 Group in 1961, Vice-Chief of the Air Staff in 1964 and Air Secretary in 1967. His last appointment was as Commander-in-Chief Far East Command in Singapore in 1970 before he retired in 1972.

== Wimbledon chairmanship ==
Upon his retirement he became Chairman of the All England Lawn Tennis Club, a position he held for ten years until retiring in 1984. His chairmanship was highly influential in shaping the modern history of the club. The year prior to his appointment 81 players of the Association of Tennis Professionals (ATP) had boycotted the Wimbledon Championships, and relations between the players and the club were still strained. Burnett's calm manner and patient and tactful approach smoothed the way for reconciliation. He is also credited with giving a young John McEnroe a steer in the right direction following numerous reportings of McEnroe to the referee's office. Burnett also felt that the Royal Box should be utilised when members of the royal family were not in attendance and implemented this rule. He was succeeded as chairman of Wimbledon by Buzzer Hadingham.

== Personal and sporting achievements ==
Burnett was a keen sports player and received many accolades including two Blues at Oxford University (tennis & squash). Prior and post Second World War he won the Army squash championships and was undefeated at squash in the world from 1937 to 1939. He also played in the post-war 1946 Wimbledon Championships.

He married Valerie St. Ludger (d. 2003) and continued to live an active life playing tennis and skiing until he was over 90. He is survived by his two sons Robert and Bruce.

Military offices
| Preceded by Sir Wallace Kyle | Vice-Chief of the Air Staff; 1964–1967 | Succeeded by Sir Peter Fletcher |
| Preceded by Sir Donald Evans | Air Secretary; 1967–1970 | Succeeded by Sir Gareth Clayton |
| Preceded by Sir Peter Hill-Norton | Commander-in-Chief Far East Command; 1970–1971 | Command disbanded Replaced by ANZUK |
Sporting positions
| Preceded by Herman David | Chairman of the All England Lawn Tennis and Croquet Club; 1974–1983 | Succeeded by Buzzer Hadingham |
