= William MacDonald (RAF officer) =

Air Chief Marshal Sir William MacDonald GCB CBE DFC
- Born: 11 August 1908; County Cork, Ireland
- Died: 9 November 1984 (aged 76); Surrey, England
- Military career
- Allegiance: United Kingdom
- Branch: Royal Air Force
- Service years: 1929–1966
- Rank: Air Chief Marshal
- Commands: Near East Air Force (1958–62); AHQ Singapore (1952–54); No. 230 Group (1952); Central Flying School (1946–48); No. 137 Wing RAF (1943–44); No. 150 Squadron (1938–40)
- Conflicts: Second World War
- Awards: Knight Grand Cross of the Order of the Bath; Commander of the Order of the British Empire; Distinguished Flying Cross; Mentioned in Despatches (2); Knight of the Legion of Honour (France); Croix de Guerre (France); Order of the Star of Jordan

Air Chief Marshal Sir William Lawrence Mary MacDonald, GCB, CBE, DFC (11 August 1908 – 9 November 1984) was a Royal Air Force officer who served as Commander-in-Chief of the Near East Air Force from 1958 to 1962.

== RAF career ==
Born in County Cork and educated at Castleknock College, William MacDonald joined the Royal Air Force (RAF) in 1929. He was appointed Officer Commanding No. 150 Squadron in 1938 and served in the Second World War. On 30 September 1940, during the Battle of France, his Fairey Battle bomber was chased at tree top height by three German fighters and he cartwheeled into a French field. He continued his war service as a member of the Air Staff at Headquarters No. 1 Group before being appointed Air Officer for Administration at Headquarters No. 84 Group in November 1944.

After the war MacDonald became Commandant of the Central Flying School and then deputy director of Plans at the Air Ministry, before being appointed Air Officer Commanding No. 230 Group and then Air Officer Commanding Air Headquarters Singapore in 1952. He was made Assistant Chief of the Air Staff (Intelligence) in 1954 and Commander-in-Chief Middle East Air Force in 1958 (including responsibility for British Forces Cyprus and being Administrator of the Sovereign Base Areas of Akrotiri and Dhekelia).

Following promotion from acting air marshal to air marshal on 1 January 1960, his role was retitled Commander-in-Chief Near East Air Force on 1 March 1961.

He departed the roles of Administrator of the Sovereign Base Areas of Akrotiri and Dhekelia in the Island of Cyprus, and Air Officer Commanding-in-Chief Near East and Commander British Forces in Cyprus on 16 July 1962. He was succeeded in both roles by Air Chief Marshal Sir Denis Barnett.

MacDonald's final appointment was as Air Secretary in 1962; he was made Air Aide-de-Camp to the Queen in 1965 and retired on 11 August 1966.

He died on 9 November 1984.

Military offices
Preceded by Francis Fressanges	Assistant Chief of the Air Staff (Intelligence); 1954–1958	Succeeded by Sidney Bufton
Preceded by Sir Hubert Patch	Commander-in-Chief; RAF Middle East Air Force/Near East Air Force; 1958–1962	Succeeded by Sir Denis Barnett
Preceded by Sir Theodore McEvoy	Air Secretary; 1962–1966	Succeeded by Sir Donald Evans
