= Gareth Clayton (RAF officer) =

Royal Air Force Air Chief Marshal (1914-1992)

Sir Gareth Clayton
- Born: 13 November 1914
- Died: 5 February 1992 (aged 77)
- Military career
- Allegiance: United Kingdom
- Branch: Royal Air Force
- Service years: 1936–1972
- Rank: Air Chief Marshal
- Commands: Air Secretary (1970–72); No. 11 Group (1962–63); RAF Honington (1955–56); RAF Cottesmore (1954–55); No. 576 Squadron (1943–44)
- Conflicts: Second World War
- Awards: Knight Commander of the Order of the Bath; Distinguished Flying Cross & Bar; Mentioned in Despatches; Order of the Cloud and Banner (China)

Air Chief Marshal Sir Gareth Thomas Butler Clayton, KCB, DFC & Bar (13 November 1914 – 5 February 1992) was a senior Royal Air Force officer who served as Air Secretary from 1970 to 1972.

== RAF career ==
Clayton joined the Royal Air Force in 1936. He served in the Second World War as a Flight Commander with No. 25 Squadron and then with No. 100 Squadron before being appointed Officer Commanding No. 576 Squadron in 1943 and then Deputy Station Commander at RAF Faldingworth in 1944. He then served on the Air Staff at No. 1 Group and as a Staff Officer on the Future Operational Plans Staff at the Air Ministry.

After the War he became Air Attaché in Lisbon and then Station Commander first at RAF Cottesmore and then at RAF Honington. He was appointed Director of Operations – Air Transport & Overseas Theatres in 1959, Air Officer Commanding No. 11 Group in 1962 and Chief of Staff for the Second Tactical Air Force in 1963. He went on to be Director-General of RAF Personnel Services in 1966, Chief of Staff at Headquarters RAF Strike Command in 1969 and Air Secretary in 1970 before retiring in 1972.

He is buried in the churchyard of St Mary's, Polstead, Suffolk.

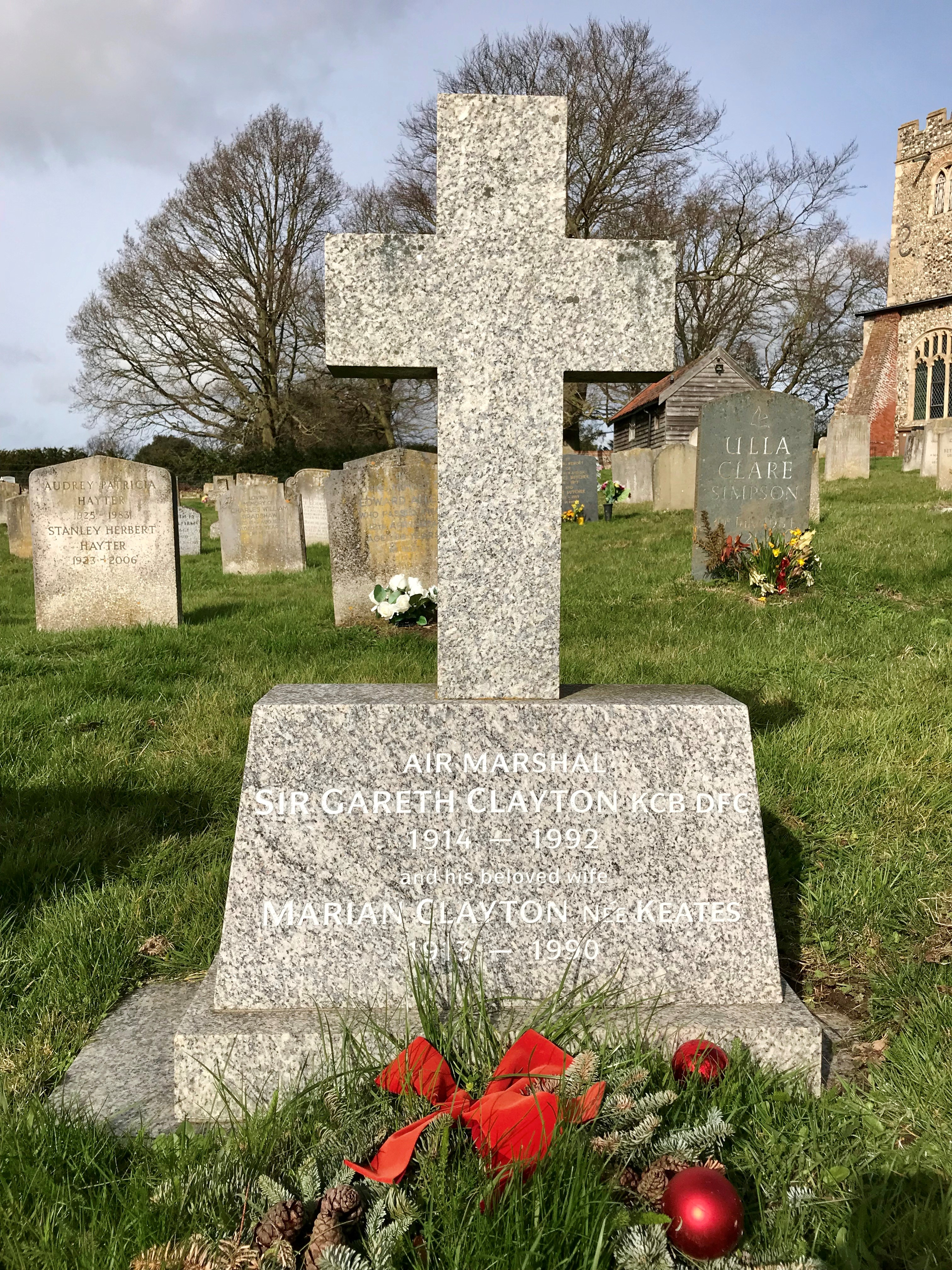
The grave of Gareth Clayton in the churchyard of St Mary, Polstead, Suffolk

Military offices
Preceded by Sir Brian Burnett	Air Secretary; 1970–1972	Succeeded by Sir John Barraclough
Preceded by Harold Maguire	Air Officer Commanding No. 11 Group; 1962–1963	Group disbanded Richard Jones on reformation in 1968
