= Hubert Patch =

Royal Air Force Air Chief Marshal (1904–1987)

Sir Hubert Patch
- Born: 16 December 1904
- Died: 18 November 1987 (aged 82)
- Military career
- Allegiance: United Kingdom
- Branch: Royal Air Force
- Service years: 1923–1961
- Rank: Air marshal
- Commands: British Forces Arabian Peninsula (1959–60); Air Member for Personnel (1959); Middle East Air Force (1956–59); RAF Fighter Command (1956); No. 11 Group (1953–56); Aeroplane and Armament Experimental Establishment (1948–50); No. 44 (Transport) Group (1946–48)
- Conflicts: Second World War
- Awards: Knight Commander of the Order of the Bath; Commander of the Order of the British Empire; Mentioned in Despatches (4)

Air Chief Marshal Sir Hubert Leonard Patch, KCB, CBE (16 December 1904 – 18 November 1987) was a senior Royal Air Force commander.

== RAF career ==
Patch joined the Royal Air Force (RAF) as a flight cadet in 1923 and served in the Second World War. After the war he became Director of Armament Requirements and then Air Officer Commanding No. 44 Group in 1946. He went on to be commandant of the Aeroplane and Armament Experimental Establishment in 1948, Air Officer for Administration at Headquarters Far East Air Force in 1951 and Senior Air Staff Officer, Far East Air Force in 1952. After that he was made Air Officer Commanding No. 11 Group in 1953, Air Officer Commanding-in-Chief of Fighter Command in January 1956 and Commander-in-Chief of the RAF Middle East Air Force in September 1956.

Patch's final appointments were as Air Member for Personnel in April 1959 and as Commander, British Forces Arabian Peninsula in September 1959, where he established a unified tri-service command in Aden, before he retired in May 1961. From 1961 to 1963 he was the BAC Representative to NATO Countries.

Military offices
Preceded by The Earl of Bandon	Air Officer Commanding No. 11 Group; 1953–1956	Succeeded by Victor Bowling
Preceded by Sir Dermot Boyle	Commander-in-Chief Fighter Command; 1956	Succeeded by Sir Thomas Pike
Preceded by Sir Claude Pelly	Commander-in-Chief RAF Middle East Air Force; 1956–1958	Succeeded by Sir William MacDonald
Preceded by Sir John Whitley	Air Member for Personnel; 1959	Succeeded by Sir Arthur McDonald
Preceded by Sir Maurice Heath	Air Officer Commanding British Forces Arabian Peninsula; 1959–1960	Succeeded by Sir Charles Elworthy
