= Air Secretary =

Position in the Royal Air Force

Air Secretary and Chief of Staff, Personnel
- Ensign of the Royal Air Force (Air Sec Command Flag)

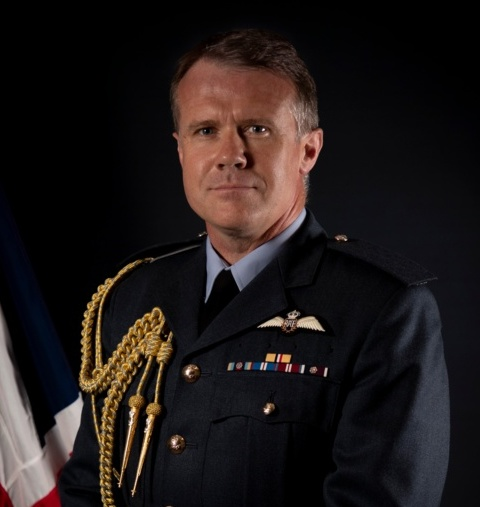
- Incumbent; Air Vice-Marshal Simon Edwards since August 2023
- Ministry of Defence
- Style: Air Vice-Marshal
- Abbreviation: COS Pers/Air Sec
- Reports to: Chief of the Air Staff
- Appointer: Sovereign of the United Kingdom
- Formation: 4 February 1957
- First holder: Air Marshal Denis Barnett
- Website: Official website

The Air Secretary and Chief of Staff, Personnel is the Royal Air Force officer with responsibility for appointments, promotions, postings, and discipline of high-ranking members of the British air force. From 1978 to 1983 the Air Secretary was more often referred to as "Air Officer Commanding Royal Air Force Personnel Management Centre". It is a senior RAF appointment, held by an officer holding the rank of air vice-marshal and appointed by the sovereign. The Air Secretary's counterpart in the British Army is the Military Secretary and the Royal Navy equivalent is the Naval Secretary.

== Air secretaries ==
The following officers have held the post:

- 4 February 1957 Air Marshal Sir Denis Barnett
- 1 May 1959 Air Chief Marshal Sir Theodore McEvoy
- 22 October 1962 Air Chief Marshal Sir William MacDonald
- 14 July 1966 Air Marshal Sir Donald Evans
- 7 December 1967 Air Chief Marshal Sir Brian Burnett
- 27 March 1970 Air Marshal Sir Gareth Clayton
- 31 March 1972 Air Marshal Sir John Barraclough
- 15 October 1973 Air Chief Marshal Sir Derek Hodgkinson
- 28 February 1976 Air Marshal Sir Neville Stack
- 1978 – 1983, post vacant
- 1983 Air Vice-Marshal Barry Duxbury
- December 1985 Air Vice-Marshal Tony Mason
- 10 February 1989 Air Vice-Marshal Robert Honey
- March 1994 Air Vice Marshal Robert O'Brien
- August 1998 Air Vice Marshal Ian Michael Stewart
- 2003 Air Vice-Marshal Graham Miller
- July 2004 Air Vice-Marshal Peter Ruddock
- 22 May 2006 Air Vice-Marshal Simon Bryant
- 27 March 2009 Air Vice-Marshal Michael Lloyd
- September 2011 Air Vice-Marshal Matthew Wiles
- 2013–2016 Air Vice-Marshal David Stubbs
- July 2016 – February 2020: Air Vice-Marshal Chris Elliot
- February 2020 – August 2023: Air Vice-Marshal Maria Byford
- August 2023 – Present: Air Vice-Marshal Simon Edwards

== See also ==
- Air Council
- Air Force Board
