= Barry Duxbury =

Royal Air Force Air Marshal (1934–1997)

Sir Barry Duxbury
- Born: 23 January 1934
- Died: 25 January 1997 (aged 63)
- Military career
- Allegiance: United Kingdom
- Branch: Royal Air Force
- Service years: 1953–1990
- Rank: Air marshal
- Commands: No. 18 Group (1986–89); Air Secretary (1983–85); RAF St Mawgan (1976–77); No. 201 Squadron (1971)
- Awards: Knight Commander of the Order of the Bath; Commander of the Order of the British Empire

Air Marshal Sir John Barry Duxbury, KCB, CBE, FRAeS (23 January 1934 – 25 January 1997) was a senior commander in the Royal Air Force who served as Air Secretary from 1983 to 1985.

== RAF career ==
Duxbury joined the Royal Air Force in 1953. He became Officer Commanding No. 201 Squadron in 1971 and station commander of RAF St Mawgan in 1976. He was appointed secretary to the Chiefs of Staff Committee in 1978, joined the Senior Directing Staff (Air) at the Royal College of Defence Studies in 1981 and became Air Secretary in 1982. He served as Air Officer Commanding No. 18 Group from 1986 and retired in 1990.

== Retirement ==
In retirement Duxbury became a Chief Executive of the Society of British Aerospace Companies. He also had an appointment as a director of one of Gerald Carroll's Carroll Group companies.

Military offices
Preceded by Sir John Fitzpatrick	Air Officer Commanding No. 18 Group; 1986–1989	Succeeded by Sir Michael Stear
Vacant	Air Secretary; 1983–1985	Succeeded by Tony Mason
