= Simon Bryant (RAF officer) =

British Royal Air Force air marshal

Sir Simon Bryant
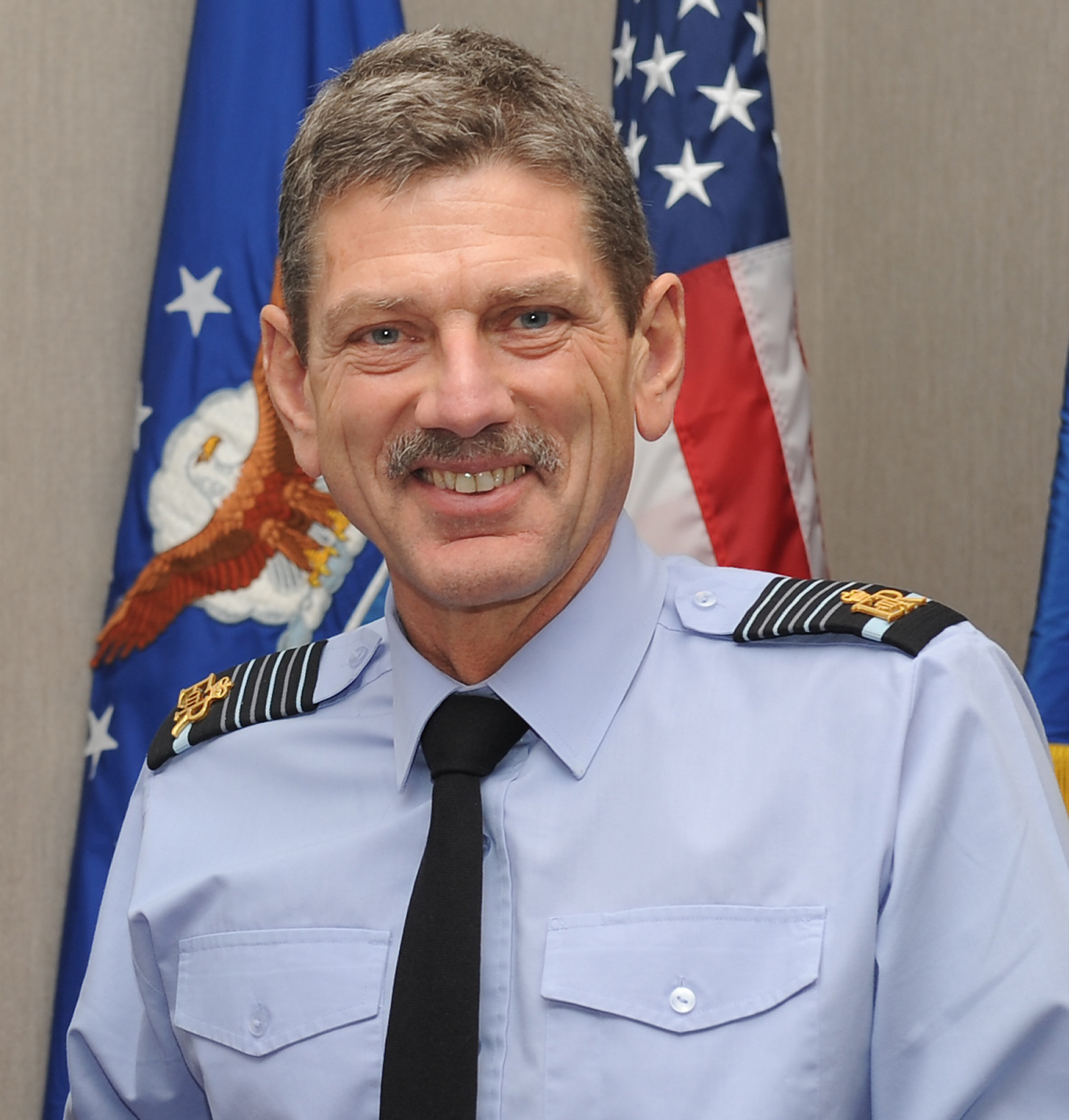
- Air Chief Marshal Bryant in 2011
- Born: 20 June 1956 (age 70)
- Military career
- Allegiance: United Kingdom
- Branch: Royal Air Force
- Service years: 1977–2012
- Rank: Air Chief Marshal
- Commands: Air Command (2010–12); Air Member for Personnel (2009–10); RAF Leuchars (2003–05); No. 43 (Fighter) Squadron (1997–99)
- Conflicts: War in Afghanistan; Iraq War
- Awards: Knight Commander of the Order of the Bath; Commander of the Order of the British Empire; Queen's Commendation for Valuable Service

Air Chief Marshal Sir Simon Bryant, KCB, CBE (born 20 June 1956) is a former Royal Air Force officer, who served as Commander-in-Chief of Air Command, and he was the second-most senior officer in the service until this post was dis-established in March 2012. He was appointed in 2010, following the sudden death of the then Commander-in-Chief, Air Chief Marshal Sir Christopher Moran, having served as Deputy Commander-in-Chief Personnel for just over a year. He was knighted in the 2011 New Year Honours List.

== Early life and education ==
Bryant was born on 20 June 1956. He was educated at Stamford School, a private school in Stamford, Lincolnshire. He studied geography at the University of Nottingham, graduating in 1977 with a Bachelor of Arts (BA) degree. He undertook a Master of Arts (MA) degree in defence studies at King's College, London, graduating in 1993. In 2012, he was awarded an honorary Doctor of Science (DSc) degree by Cranfield University.

== RAF career ==
Bryant was commissioned as a University Cadet in 1974. He was regraded on graduation, and then promoted to flying officer and to flight lieutenant in 1978. Trained as a fast jet navigator, he completed two tours on the F-4 Phantom in the Air Defence role before an exchange tour with the US Navy, instructing on the F-14 Tomcat. Promoted to squadron leader in 1985, Bryant then flew the Tornado F3 as a squadron executive at RAF Leeming.

Following a tour in the Air Secretary's Department, Staff College (graduating in 1992), a Force Development appointment in the Ministry of Defence, and promotion to wing commander in 1993, Bryant served as a Senior Operations Officer at the Combined Air Operations Centre at Vicenza in 1996, before being appointed Commanding Officer of 43(F) Squadron at RAF Leuchars, again flying the Tornado F3.

Promoted to group captain in 1999, Bryant served as the Personal Staff Officer to the Deputy Supreme Commander at Supreme Headquarters Allied Powers Europe before being appointed Commander of British Forces in Oman; he was awarded a Queen's Commendation for Valuable Service in 2002.

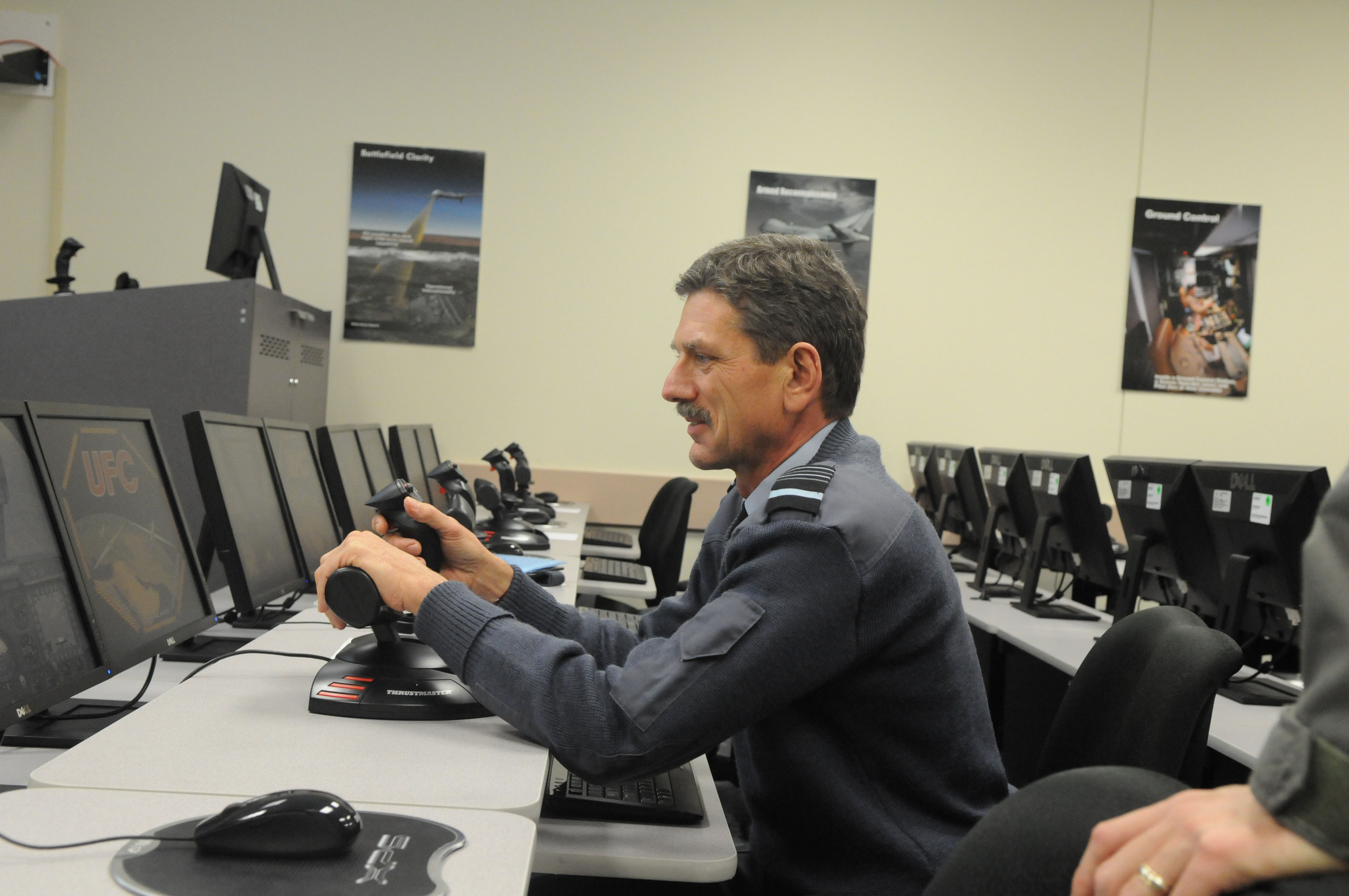
Bryant operates an UAV trainer during a visit to Randolph Air Force Base, Texas in 2009

Following the Higher Command and Staff Course, Bryant was promoted to air commodore in 2004, his initial appointment being as Air Officer Scotland and Station Commander RAF Leuchars before a further tour in the Middle East as Director of the Combined Air Operations Centre at Al Udeid in Qatar; he was appointed a Commander of the Order of the British Empire in 2005. On return to the UK, a tour as Head of Joint Capability at the Ministry of Defence was followed by his promotion to air vice marshal and appointment as Chief of Staff Personnel and Air Secretary in 2006. In 2009 he was promoted to air marshal and appointed Deputy Commander-in-Chief Personnel (and Air Member for Personnel), in which position he had been serving for just over a year when the then Commander-in-Chief, Air Chief Marshal Sir Christopher Moran died suddenly, and Bryant was promoted in order to replace Moran. He was appointed a Knight Commander of the Order of the Bath in the 2011 New Year Honours List.

In June 2011, Bryant said, that in the context of operations in Libya, "huge" demands were being placed on equipment and personnel. Prime Minister David Cameron responded by telling the defence chiefs to stop criticising Libya mission. His retirement was marked by a dining-out on 30 March 2012.

== Later career ==
After leaving the RAF, Bryant was military adviser to BAE Systems from 2012 to 2013. From 2013 to 2018, he was Vice President (Oman), BAE Systems.

== Personal life ==
Bryant is married to Helen, and they have a son, Benjamin, and daughter Alexandra. He is a sportsman, particularly enjoying golf, real tennis, skiing, hockey and squash.

Military offices
Preceded by M J Routledge	Air Officer Scotland and Station Commander, RAF Leuchars; 2003–2005	Succeeded by J Stinton
Preceded by Peter Ruddock	Chief of Staff Personnel and Air Secretary; 2006–2009	Succeeded by Michael Lloyd
Preceded by Stephen Dalton	Deputy Commander-in-Chief Personnel, Air Command and Air Member for Personnel; 2009–2010	Succeeded by Andrew Pulford
Preceded by Sir Chris Moran	Commander-in-Chief, Air Command; 2010–2012	Command disbanded
