= Theodore McEvoy =

Sir Theodore McEvoy
- Born: 21 November 1904
- Died: 19 September 1991 (aged 86)
- Relatives: Christopher McEvoy (brother)
- Military career
- Allegiance: United Kingdom
- Branch: Royal Air Force
- Service years: 1923–1962
- Rank: Air chief marshal
- Commands: No. 61 Group (1949–50); RAF Northolt (1941); No. 1 Squadron (1935–37)
- Conflicts: Second World War
- Awards: Knight Commander of the Order of the Bath; Commander of the Order of the British Empire; Mentioned in Despatches (2); Commander's Cross of the Order of Polonia Restituta (Poland)

Air Chief Marshal Sir Theodore Neuman McEvoy, KCB, CBE (21 November 1904 – 19 September 1991) was a senior Royal Air Force officer who held high command in the 1950s and early 1960s. His last appointment was as Air Secretary.

== RAF career ==
McEvoy joined the Royal Air Force (RAF) as a cadet in 1923. He became Officer Commanding No. 1 Squadron in 1935 and served in the Second World War as station commander at RAF Northolt, before moving on to be Group Captain – Operations at Headquarters RAF Fighter Command in December 1941. This was followed by appointments as Senior Air Staff Officer, first at No. 11 Group, then at Desert Air Force, and finally at No. 84 Group. In 1945 he was appointed Director of Staff Duties at the Air Ministry.

After the war McEvoy was appointed Air Officer Commanding No. 61 Group in 1949 and then from 1950 he was Assistant Chief of the Air Staff (Training) at the Air Ministry. He went on to be RAF Instructor at the Imperial Defence College from 1954, chief of staff at Headquarters Allied Air Forces Central Europe from 1956 and Air Secretary from 1959 before retiring in 1962.

In the 1950s he became keen on flying gliders and was President of the RAF Gliding and Soaring Association (RAFGSA). He was instrumental in setting up the RAFGSA centre at RAF Bicester and himself flew cross-country flights from there in gliders. On one of these he landed at RAF Benson and the station commander was about to take action after what he thought was an unauthorised landing when the pilot was revealed as an air chief marshal and he decided to congratulate him instead.

== Later life ==
In retirement, McEvoy became Chairman of the Society for Italic Handwriting.

Military offices
Preceded by Sir Denis Barnett	Air Secretary; 1959–1963	Succeeded by Sir William MacDonald
