= Air aide-de-camp =

Royal Air Force honorary officer

An air aide-de-camp is a senior honorary aide-de-camp appointment for air officers in the Royal Air Force, the Royal Australian Air Force and the Indian Air Force. Normally the recipient is appointed as an air aide-de-camp to the head of state. The British Army's equivalent appointment is aide-de-camp general.

== Royal Air Force ==
Recent appointments have included successive Chiefs of the Air Staff, as well as successive Commanders-in-chief, Strike Command (latterly Air Command), prior to the posts being merged in 2012:

- Air Chief Marshal Sir Richard Johns (1997–2000)
- Air Chief Marshal Sir Peter Squire (1999–2003)
- Air Chief Marshal Sir Anthony Bagnall (2000–2001)
- Air Chief Marshal Sir John Day (2001–2003)
- Air Chief Marshal Sir Brian Burridge (2003–2006)
- Air Chief Marshal Sir Jock Stirrup (2003–?)
- Air Chief Marshal Sir Glenn Torpy (2006–2009)
- Air Chief Marshal Sir Joe French (2006–2007)
- Air Chief Marshal Sir Clive Loader (2007–2009)
- Air Chief Marshal Sir Stephen Dalton (2009–2013)
- Air Chief Marshal Sir Christopher Moran (2009–2010) (died in office)
- Air Chief Marshal Sir Simon Bryant (2010–2012)
- Air Chief Marshal Sir Andrew Pulford (2013–2016)
- Air Chief Marshal Sir Stephen Hillier (2016–2019)
- Air Chief Marshal Sir Michael Wigston (2019–2023)
- Air Chief Marshal Sir Rich Knighton (2023–present) (became CDS)
- Air Chief Marshal Sir Harvey Smyth (2025-present)
