= Air Member for Personnel =

Senior Royal Air Force officer

- (AMP Command Flag)

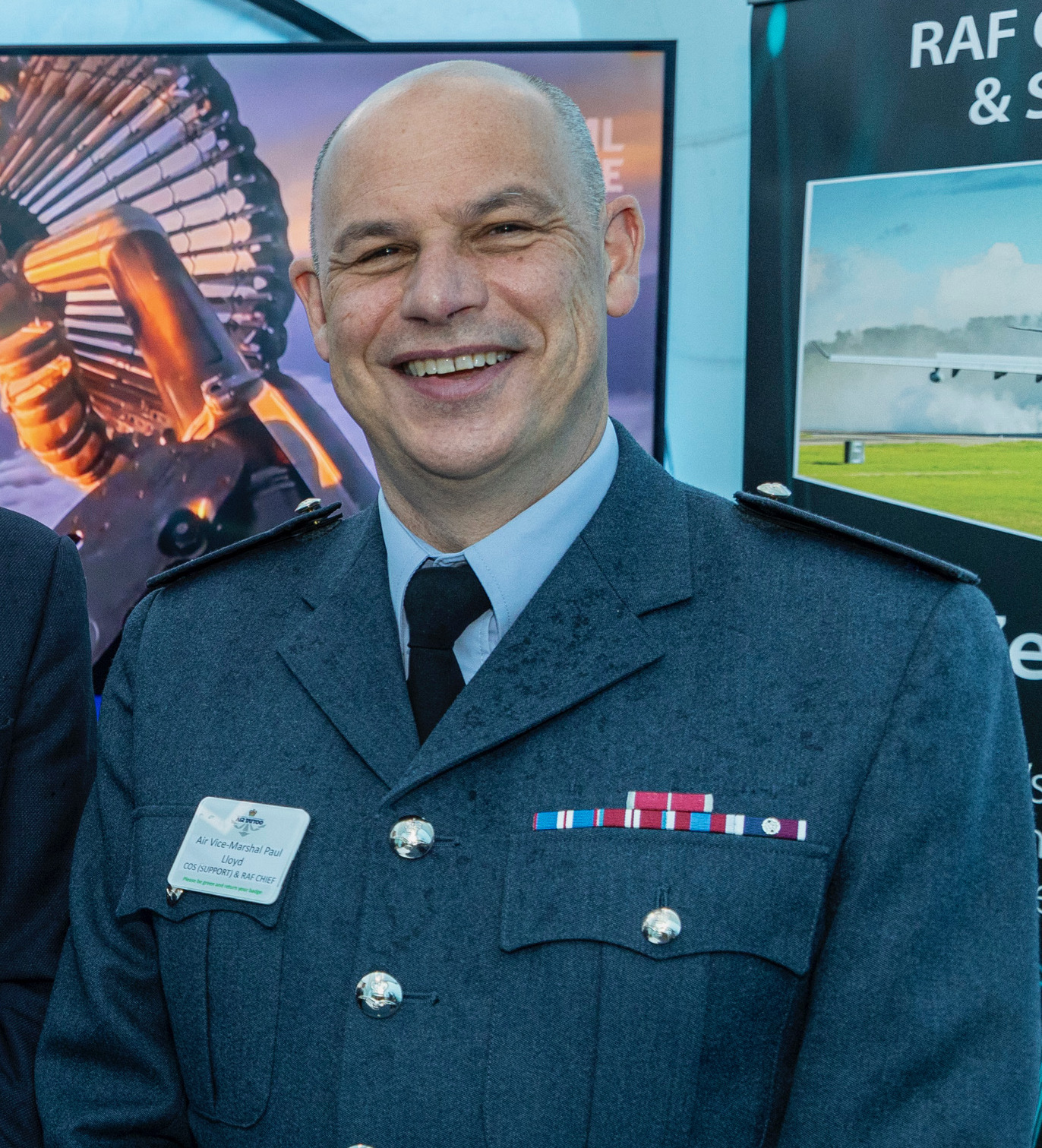
- Incumbent; Air Marshal Paul Lloyd since September 2023
- Style: Air Marshal
- Abbreviation: AMP
- Member of: Air Force Board
- Reports to: Chief of the Air Staff
- Appointer: His Majesty The King
- Formation: 1918 (As Master-General of Personnel)
- First holder: Major-General Sir Godfrey Marshall Paine
- Website: Official Website

The Air Member for Personnel (AMP) is the senior Royal Air Force officer who is responsible for personnel matters and is a member of the Air Force Board. The AMP is in charge of all aspects of recruiting, non-operational flying and ground training, career management, welfare, terms, and conditions of service, and resettlement for RAF regular, reserve, and civilian staffs worldwide.

In 1918 on the establishment of the post it was titled the Master-General of Personnel, while from 1919 to 1923 the post was designated as the Director of Personnel. Thereafter it has been known by its current title, the Air Member for Personnel. In 1994 with the establishment of Personnel and Training Command (PTC), the post of Commander-in-Chief PTC and the Air Member for Personnel were held concurrently by a single officer at any one time. In 2007 PTC was disbanded and from then onward, the Air Member for Personnel has been double-hatted as Deputy Commander-in-Chief Air Command with responsibility for No. 22 Group RAF and RAF personnel management functions.

== History ==
The post of Master-General of Personnel was established on 3 January 1918 and the occupant sat on the Air Council. The first incumbent was Major-General Godfrey Paine. Some time in April or June 1919, the post was downgraded to Director of Personnel within the Department of the Chief of the Air Staff and the incumbent ceased to sit on the Air Council. However, in 1923 the appointment of Director of Personnel was upgraded to that of Air Member for Personnel and re-appointed to the Air Council.

On 1 April 1994, at the establishments of Personnel and Training Command, the new Air Officer Commanding in Chief was also appointed as Air Member for Personnel. Upon the merger of Personnel and Training Command with Strike Command to form RAF Air Command on 1 April 2007, the post of AOC Personnel and Training was re-designated as Deputy Commander-in-Chief Personnel (DCinC Pers), retaining the responsibility to Chief of the Air Staff as Air Member for Personnel.

== Masters-General of Personnel ==
- 3 January 1918 Major-General G M Paine
- 22 August 1918 Major-General W S Brancker
- 1919 Post vacant

== Directors of Personnel ==
- 1919 Rear Admiral C F Lambert
- 1 April 1920 Air Vice-Marshal J F A Higgins
- 1921 unknown
- January or February 1922 Air Commodore, later Air Vice-Marshal, O Swann

== Air Members for Personnel ==
The following have held the post:

- 1923 Air Vice-Marshal O Swann
- 27 November 1923 Air Vice-Marshal Sir Philip Game
- 1 January 1929 Air Chief Marshal Sir John Salmond
- 1 January 1930 Air Vice-Marshal Sir Tom Webb-Bowen
- 26 September 1931 Air Marshal Sir Edward Ellington
- 22 May 1933 Post Vacant
- 31 July 1933 Air Vice-Marshal F W Bowhill
- 1 July 1937 Air Marshal Sir William Mitchell
- 1 February 1939 Air Marshal C F A Portal
- 3 April 1940 Air Marshal Sir Leslie Gossage
- 1 December 1940 Air Marshal Sir Philip Babington
- 17 August 1942 Air Marshal Sir Bertine Sutton
- 5 April 1945 Air Marshal Sir John Slessor
- 1 October 1947 Air Marshal Sir Hugh Saunders
- 31 October 1949 Air Chief Marshal Sir Leslie Hollinghurst
- 1 November 1952 Air Marshal Sir Francis Fogarty
- 1 January 1957 Air Marshal Sir John Whitley
- 1 April 1959 Air Chief Marshal Sir Hubert Patch
- 1 October 1959 Air Marshal Sir Arthur McDonald
- 11 December 1961 Air Marshal Sir Walter Cheshire
- 22 February 1965 Air Marshal Sir David Lee
- 18 March 1968 Air Marshal Sir Andrew Humphrey
- 18 March 1970 Air Marshal Sir Lewis Hodges
- 25 April 1973 Air Marshal Sir Harold Martin
- 5 October 1974 Air Marshal Sir Neil Cameron
- 5 June 1976 Air Marshal Sir John Aiken
- 25 February 1978 Air Marshal Sir John Gingell
- 3 May 1980 Air Marshal Sir Charles Ness
- 7 May 1983 Air Marshal Sir Thomas Kennedy
- 1986 Air Marshal Sir Anthony Skingsley
- 20 March 1987 Air Marshal Sir Laurence Jones
- 25 October 1989 Air Marshal Sir David Parry-Evans
- April 1991 Air Marshal Sir Roger Palin
- 16 April 1993 Air Marshal Sir Andrew Wilson
- 1 May 1995 Air Marshal Sir David Cousins
- 7 August 1998 Air Marshal Sir Anthony Bagnall
- March 2000 Air Marshal Sir John Day
- 20 March 2001 Air Marshal Sir Christopher Coville
- 25 April 2003 Air Marshal Sir Joe French
- 6 January 2006 Air Marshal Sir Barry Thornton
- 1 April 2007 Air Marshal Sir Stephen Dalton
- 1 April 2009 Air Marshal Sir Simon Bryant
- 18 June 2010 Air Marshal Sir Andrew Pulford
- 3 May 2013 Air Marshal Sir Barry North
- May 2016 Air Marshal Sean Reynolds
- August 2018 Air Marshal Mike Wigston
- May 2019 Air Marshal Andrew Turner
