= Anthony Bagnall =

Royal Air Force Air Chief Marshal

Air Chief Marshal Sir Anthony Bagnall GBE KCB FRAeS
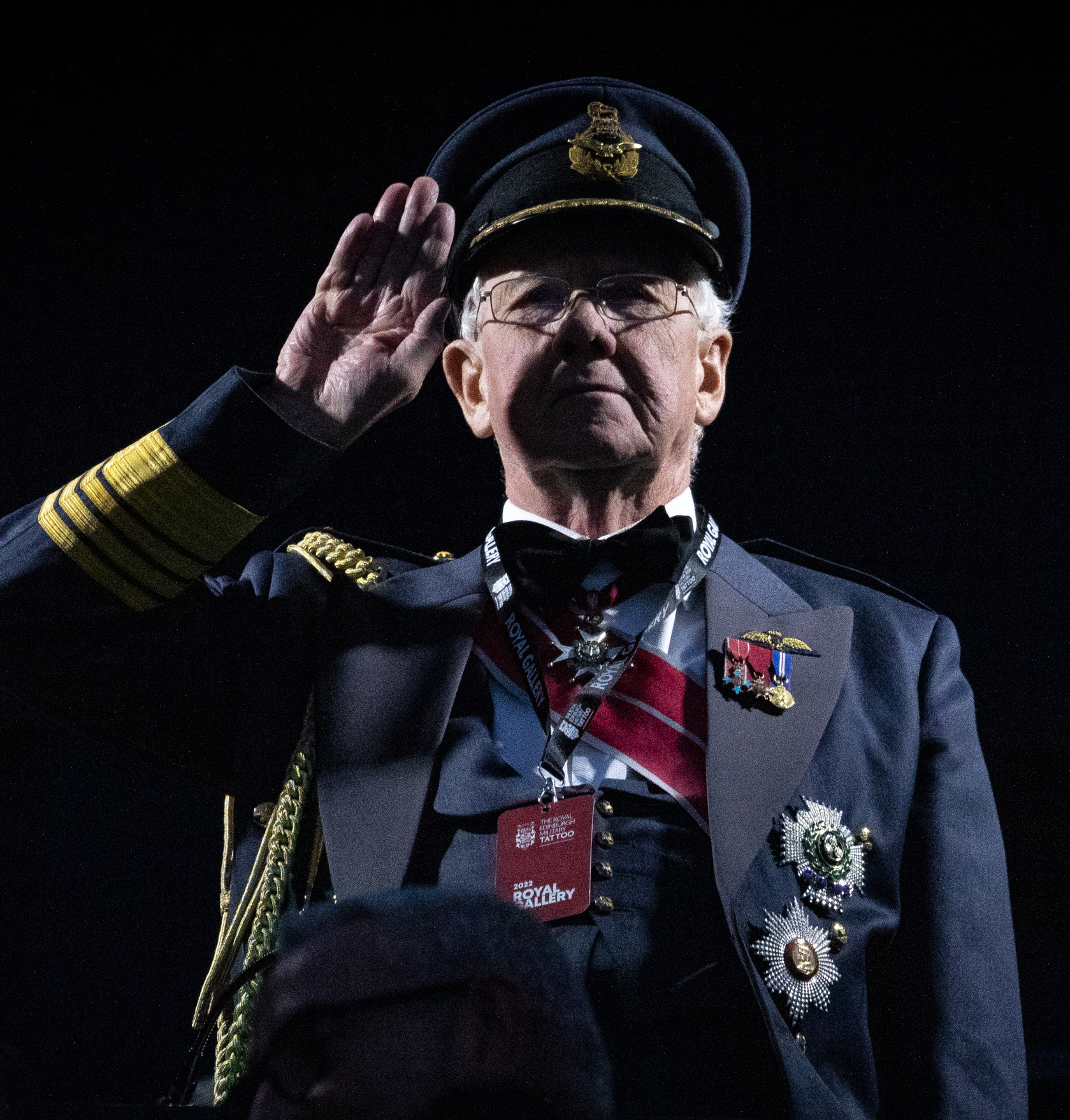
- Bagnall in 2022
- Born: 8 June 1945 (age 81)
- Military career
- Allegiance: United Kingdom
- Branch: Royal Air Force
- Service years: 1964–2005
- Rank: Air Chief Marshal
- Commands: Vice-Chief of the Defence Staff (2001–05); Strike Command (2000–01); Air Member for Personnel (1998–00); No. 11 Group (1994–96); RAF Leuchars (1988–89); No. 23 Squadron (1983–85); No. 43 Squadron (1983)
- Awards: Knight Grand Cross of the Order of the British Empire; Knight Commander of the Order of the Bath

Sir Anthony John Crowther "Tony" Bagnall (born 8 June 1945) is a retired senior Royal Air Force officer and former Vice-Chief of the Defence Staff.

== RAF career ==
Bagnall was commissioned into the Royal Air Force in 1967. He became a weapons instructor on the English Electric Lightning fighter aircraft later that year. Bagnall became commanding officer of No. 43 Squadron flying the McDonnell Douglas Phantom FG.1, and then No. 23 Squadron in the Falkland Islands in 1983 before becoming director of air staff briefing and co-ordination in 1985 and then station commander of RAF Leuchars in Fife in 1988.

Promoted to air commodore in 1990, he was made director of air force staff duties at the Ministry of Defence in 1991. Promoted again, this time to air vice marshal, in 1992 he was appointed assistant chief of the air staff and then in 1994 went on to become air officer commanding No. 11 Group. This was followed by a tour starting in 1996 as deputy commander-in-chief, Allied Forces Central Europe in the rank of air marshal.

In 1998 he became air member for personnel and air officer commanding-in-chief, Personnel and Training Command before being appointed commander-in-chief Strike Command in 2000. He served as vice-chief of the defence staff from 2001 until his retirement in 2005.

In October 1982, when living in Cambridgeshire, he was appointed an Officer of the Order of the British Empire (OBE) for his work on air-to-air refuelling in the Falklands War.

He was appointed a Knight Commander of the Order of the Bath (KCB) in the 1998 New Year Honours.

In 2005 he became a member of the Court of the University of St Andrews.

== Family ==
He is married to Pamela; they have three children.

Military offices
Preceded by Sir Timothy Garden	Assistant Chief of the Air Staff; 1992–1994	Succeeded by Sir Peter Squire
Preceded by John Allison	Air Officer Commanding No. 11 Group; 1994–1996	Group merged with No. 18 Group; Cliff Spink as AOC No. 11/18 Group
Preceded by Sir David Cousins	Commander-in-Chief Personnel and Training Command; Air Member for Personnel; 1998–2000	Succeeded by Sir John Day
Preceded by Sir Peter Squire	Commander-in-Chief RAF Strike Command; 2000–2001	Succeeded by Sir John Day
Preceded by Sir Peter Abbott	Vice-Chief of the Defence Staff; 2001–2005	Succeeded by Sir Timothy Granville-Chapman
Honorary titles
Preceded by Sir Richard Johns	Air Aide-de-Camp to Her Majesty The Queen; 2000–2001	Succeeded by Sir John Day
