= Joe French =

Royal Air Force officer

Air Chief Marshal Sir Joe French KCB CBE ADC FRAeS
- Born: 15 July 1949 (age 77)
- Military career
- Allegiance: United Kingdom
- Branch: Royal Air Force
- Service years: 1967–2007
- Rank: Air Chief Marshal
- Commands: RAF Strike Command (2006–07); Personnel and Training Command (2003–06); Chief of Defence Intelligence (2000–03); RAF Odiham (1989–91); No. 7 Squadron
- Conflicts: The Troubles
- Awards: Knight Commander of the Order of the Bath; Commander of the Order of the British Empire; Mentioned in Despatches

Air Chief Marshal Sir Joseph Charles French, KCB, CBE, ADC, FRAeS (born 15 July 1949) is a retired senior Royal Air Force officer who was the last Air Officer Commanding-in-Chief RAF Strike Command (2006–07).

== RAF career ==
French joined the Royal Air Force (RAF) in 1967 and qualified as a helicopter pilot, flying Wessex, Puma and Chinook. Postings included Sharjah, Hong Kong, Germany and an operational tour of Northern Ireland in 1972, for which he was Mentioned in Despatches. He was commanding officer of No. 7 Squadron (Chinook) at RAF Odiham, where he was later station commander (1989–91).

French attended the RAF Staff College and the Royal College of Defence Studies. Staff postings included aide-de-camp to the Chief of the Defence Staff, and Personal Staff Officer to the Air Officer Commanding-in-Chief Strike Command. He served on the staff of the Central Trials and Tactics Organisation, and was Head of the RAF Presentation Team.

French served as Director of Air Force Staff Duties, and as Assistant Chief of Defence Staff (Policy), before being appointed Director-General of Intelligence Collection. He was Chief of Defence Intelligence (CDI) from 2000, and it was while he was CDI that the controversial September Dossier was drafted which attempted to assess the state of Iraq's weapons of mass destruction. He was appointed Commander-in-Chief Personnel and Training Command and Air Member for Personnelin 2003 and Air Officer Commanding-in-Chief RAF Strike Command in 2006.

French was appointed a Commander of the Order of the British Empire in the 1991 New Year Honours, and a Knight Commander of the Order of the Bath in the 2003 New Year Honours.

== Retirement ==
Upon his retirement in 2007, French became President of the RAF Servicing Commando and Tactical Supply Wing Association.

Military offices
Preceded by Sir Alan West	Chief of Defence Intelligence; 2000–2003	Succeeded by Andrew Ridgway
Preceded by Sir Christopher Colville	Commander-in-Chief Personnel and Training Command and Air Member for Personnel; 2003–2006	Succeeded by Barry Thornton
Preceded by Sir Brian Burridge	Commander-in-Chief RAF Strike Command; 2006–2007	Command merged with PTC to form Air Command with Sir Clive Loader as CinC
Honorary titles
Preceded by Sir Brian Burridge	Air Aide-de-Camp to Her Majesty The Queen; 2006–2007	Succeeded by Sir Clive Loader
