= Jock Stirrup =

British peer and former RAF officer (born 1949)

Marshal of the Royal Air Force The Right Honourable The Lord Stirrup KG GCB AFC FRAeS FCMI
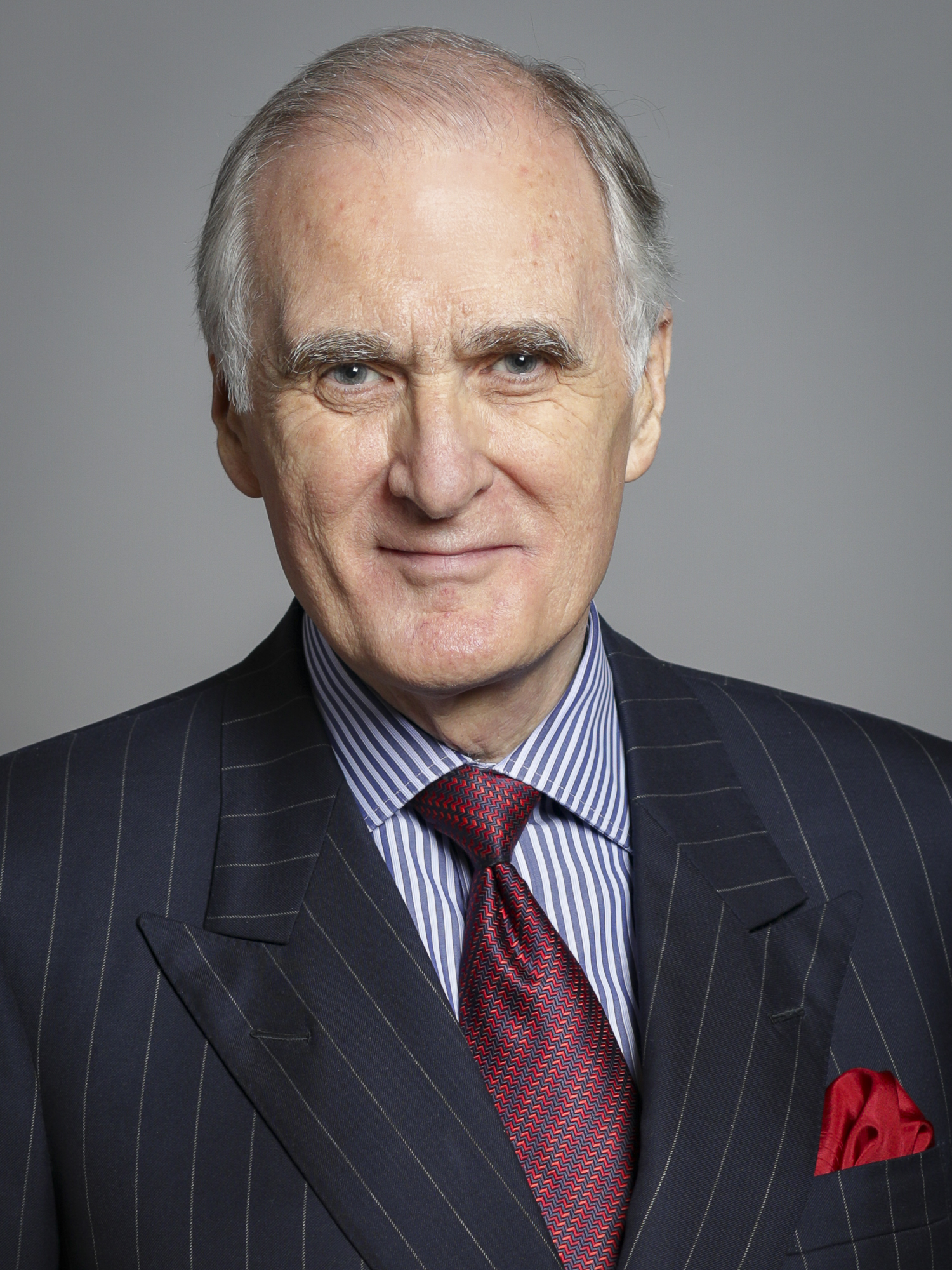
- Official portrait, 2020
- Born: 4 December 1949 (age 76); Paddington, London
- Military career
- Allegiance: United Kingdom
- Branch: Royal Air Force
- Service years: 1968–2011
- Rank: Marshal of the Royal Air Force
- Nickname: Jock
- Service number: 8020760D
- Commands: Chief of the Defence Staff (2006–10); Chief of the Air Staff (2003–06); No. 1 Group (1997–98); RAF Marham (1990–92); No. 2 Squadron (1985–87)
- Conflicts: Dhofar War; Cold War; Operation Telic; War in Afghanistan
- Awards: Knight Companion of the Order of the Garter; Knight Grand Cross of the Order of the Bath; Air Force Cross
- Other work

Member of the House of Lords
- Lord Temporal
- Life peerage 28 January 2011

Personal details
- Party: Crossbencher

Marshal of the Royal Air Force Graham Eric Stirrup, Baron Stirrup (born 4 December 1949), informally known as Jock Stirrup, is a former senior Royal Air Force commander who was the Chief of the Defence Staff from 2006 until his retirement in late 2010. He is now a Crossbench member of the House of Lords. In April 2013, he was appointed a Knight Companion of the Order of the Garter by Queen Elizabeth II.

As a junior RAF officer, Stirrup was a jet pilot, and saw action in the Dhofar War. Later in his career, he commanded No. 2 Squadron and RAF Marham. After several senior air force appointments, Stirrup was made the Deputy Commander-in-Chief of Strike Command and during this time he served as the first commander of British forces engaged in fighting the Taliban. In 2002, Stirrup was appointed the Deputy Chief of the Defence Staff responsible for equipment and capability and was heavily involved in procuring equipment for the invasion of Iraq. Spending a little over a year in that role, he was then appointed the Chief of the Air Staff, in which capacity he served from 2003 to 2006. He became Chief of the Defence Staff in 2006: during his time in office the British Armed Forces faced significant commitments both to Iraq (Operation Telic) and Afghanistan (Operation Herrick). Stirrup retired as Chief of the Defence Staff on 29 October 2010, taking a seat in the House of Lords in 2011.

== Early and personal life ==
Graham Eric Stirrup was born on 4 December 1949, the son of William Hamilton Stirrup and his wife, Jacqueline Brenda Stirrup (née Coulson). He was educated at Merchant Taylors' School in Northwood, Hertfordshire.

Stirrup married Mary Alexandra Elliott in 1976 and they have one son. Stirrup includes golf, music, theatre and history among his interests. He is a fellow of the Royal Aeronautical Society, a fellow of the Chartered Management Institute and a member of the Society of Knights of the Round Table.

== RAF career ==
Stirrup started his military career at the RAF College Cranwell in Lincolnshire on 1 April 1968 and it was from Cranwell that he received his commission on 31 July 1970. He was promoted to flying officer on 31 July 1971 with seniority backdated to 31 January, and to flight lieutenant from 31 July 1973. From 1973 to 1975, Stirrup was on loan service with the Sultan of Oman's Air Force.

In Oman, Stirrup flew BAC Strikemasters during the Dhofar War in the close air support and interdiction roles, giving him valuable battle experience of the use of air power in counter-insurgency operations. After he returned to the United Kingdom in 1975, Stirrup was posted to No. 41 Squadron where he flew the SEPECAT Jaguar in the fighter reconnaissance role. Stirrup went on to serve in an exchange tour in the United States where he flew the all-weather tactical reconnaissance RF-4C Phantom.

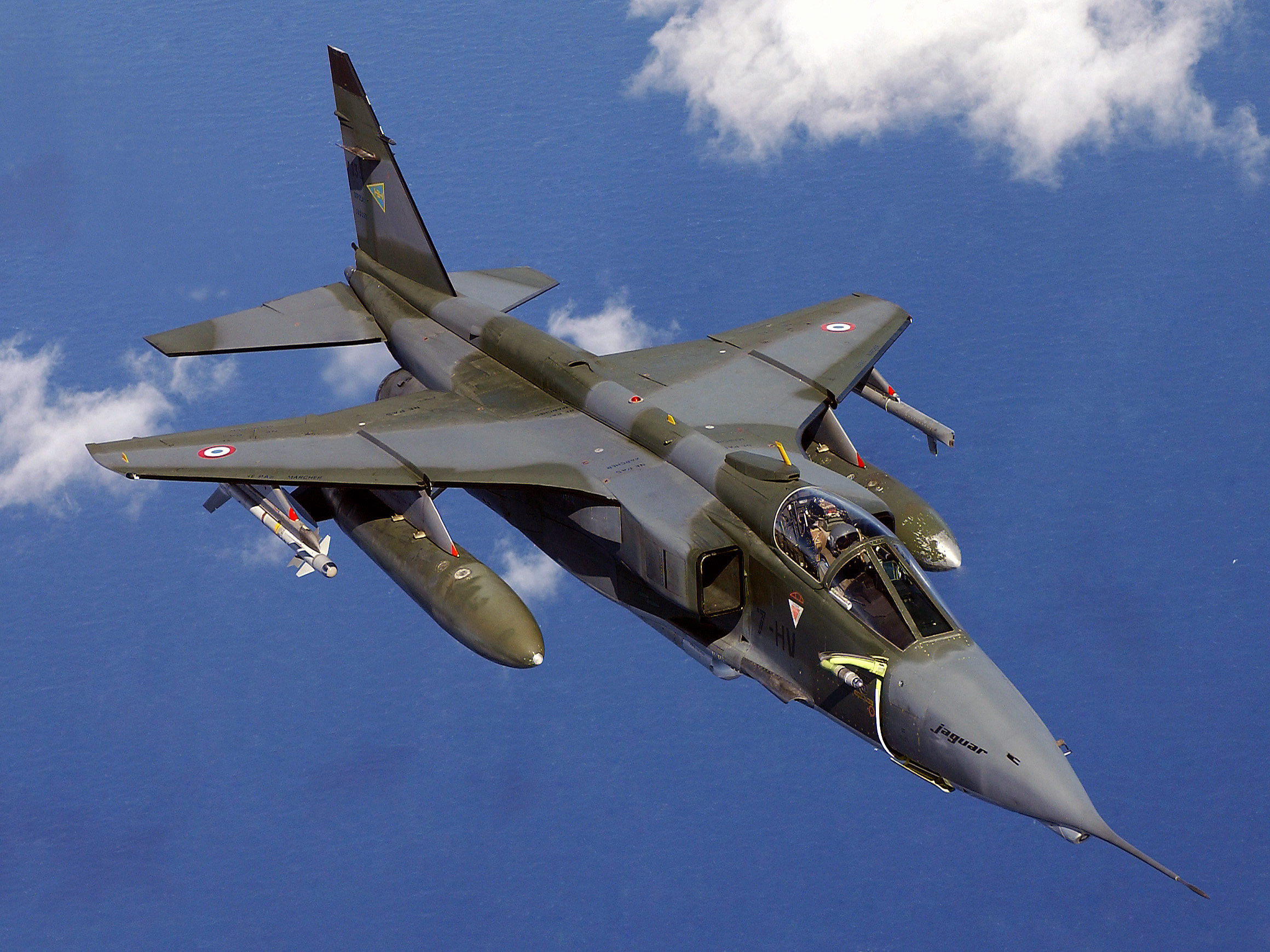
Jaguar, a type flown by Stirrup in the 1970s

Promoted to squadron leader on 1 January 1980, Stirrup was serving as a flight commander on No. 226 Operational Conversion Unit which was based at RAF Lossiemouth in March 1983: his duties centred around the instruction of trainee pilots on the SEPECAT Jaguar and, on 7 March 1983, Stirrup was carrying out a student progress check from the rear seat of his aircraft when they suffered a serious bird strike. Stirrup was unable to ascertain whether his student was conscious and forward vision through the canopy was obscured: one of his engines caught fire, and although ejecting from the aircraft would have been justified, not knowing whether the student was conscious or not, Stirrup managed to land at RAF Leuchars. Stirrup was later awarded the Air Force Cross in recognition of his handling of the incident.

Stirrup was promoted to wing commander on 1 July 1984. In 1985 Stirrup received a command appointment, as the Officer Commanding No. 2 Squadron which at that time was operating the Jaguar from RAF Laarbruch in West Germany: along with other NATO air units, his squadron's role was low-level tactical reconnaissance in the face of the Soviet Cold War threat. Stirrup gained first hand experience of the higher-level workings of the RAF when, in 1987, he was appointed Personal Staff Officer to the Chief of the Air Staff.

Having been promoted to group captain on 1 January 1990, from 1990 to 1992, Stirrup served as Station Commander of RAF Marham and during his time in command, RAF Marham's strike aircraft were dispatched to the Middle East, seeing action in the Gulf War air campaign. In 1993 Stirrup attended the Royal College of Defence Studies (RCDS). Stirrup was promoted to air commodore on 1 January 1994, and appointed Director of Air Force Plans and Programmes that year. Promoted to air vice-marshal on 1 July 1997, he became Air Officer Commanding No. 1 Group in April 1997, Assistant Chief of the Air Staff in August 1998 and, having been promoted to air marshal on 6 November 2000, he was made Deputy Commander-in-Chief RAF Strike Command that year. His appointment at Strike Command also entailed taking on the additional roles of being the Commander of NATO's Combined Air Operations Centre 9 (based at High Wycombe) and serving as the Director of the European Air Group.

From September 2001 to January 2002, Stirrup was UK National Contingent Commander for Operation Veritas (British operations against the Taliban) in Afghanistan, his first direct experience of front-line operations overseas since 1987. In this role Stirrup directed the British contribution to the US-led Operation Enduring Freedom and he was the Senior British Military Advisor to General Tommy Franks, the Commander-in-Chief of United States Central Command. At MacDill Air Force Base, Stirrup headed the 60 strong British team who were contributing to the US-led operational planning. Stirrup was replaced by Lieutenant General Cedric Delves.

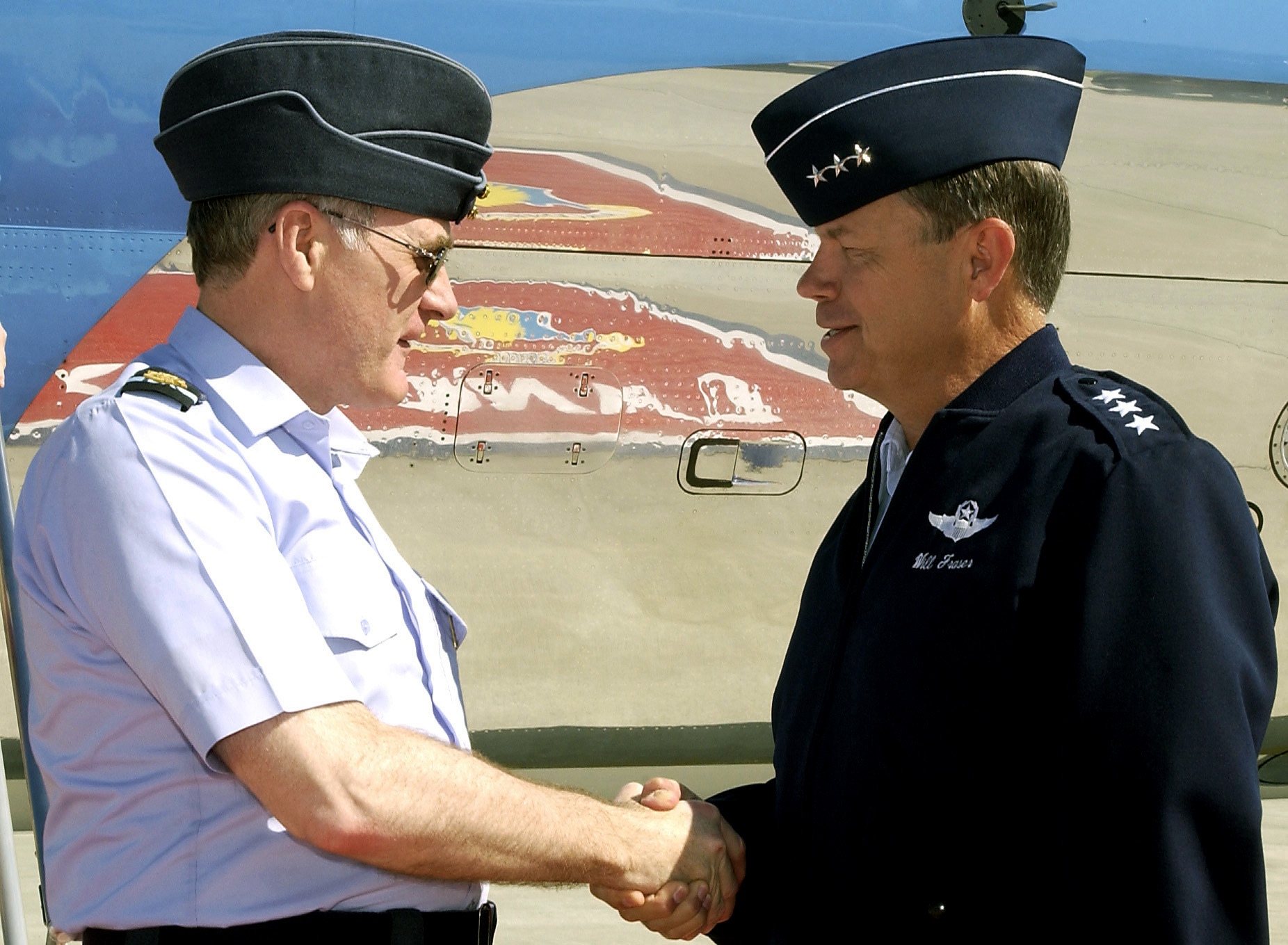
Stirrup (left) with General Fraser in 2005.

In April 2002 Stirrup was appointed Deputy Chief of the Defence Staff (Equipment Capability), a post he held until May 2003. His main task was production of equipment plans for the Army, Air Force and Navy while ensuring that the plans could be afforded over the coming years. The planning for the invasion of Iraq required new equipment and Stirrup became increasingly involved in planning for urgent operational requirements. A particular difficulty faced by Stirrup was the need to place equipment orders with industry before the Government was prepared to publicly commit to the action. Stirrup briefed ministers on this point but was prevented from placing the orders according to his desired timescale. In the end some critical items such as body armour, boots and desert clothing were not available to all the personnel who needed them when they deployed.

Stirrup was promoted to air chief marshal and appointed Chief of the Air Staff on 1 August 2003. In July 2004 Stirrup set out his strategic direction for the RAF which was based upon working to achieve an increasingly modern and multi-role aircraft fleet, reducing the number of RAF stations by creating fewer but larger and better-equipped bases and reducing the number of personnel while maintaining or improving their training.

== Chief of the Defence Staff ==
Stirrup was appointed Chief of the Defence Staff – just when the British Armed Forces were facing significant commitments both to Iraq (Operation Telic) and Afghanistan (Operation Herrick) – on 28 April 2006.

=== Operations in Iraq ===
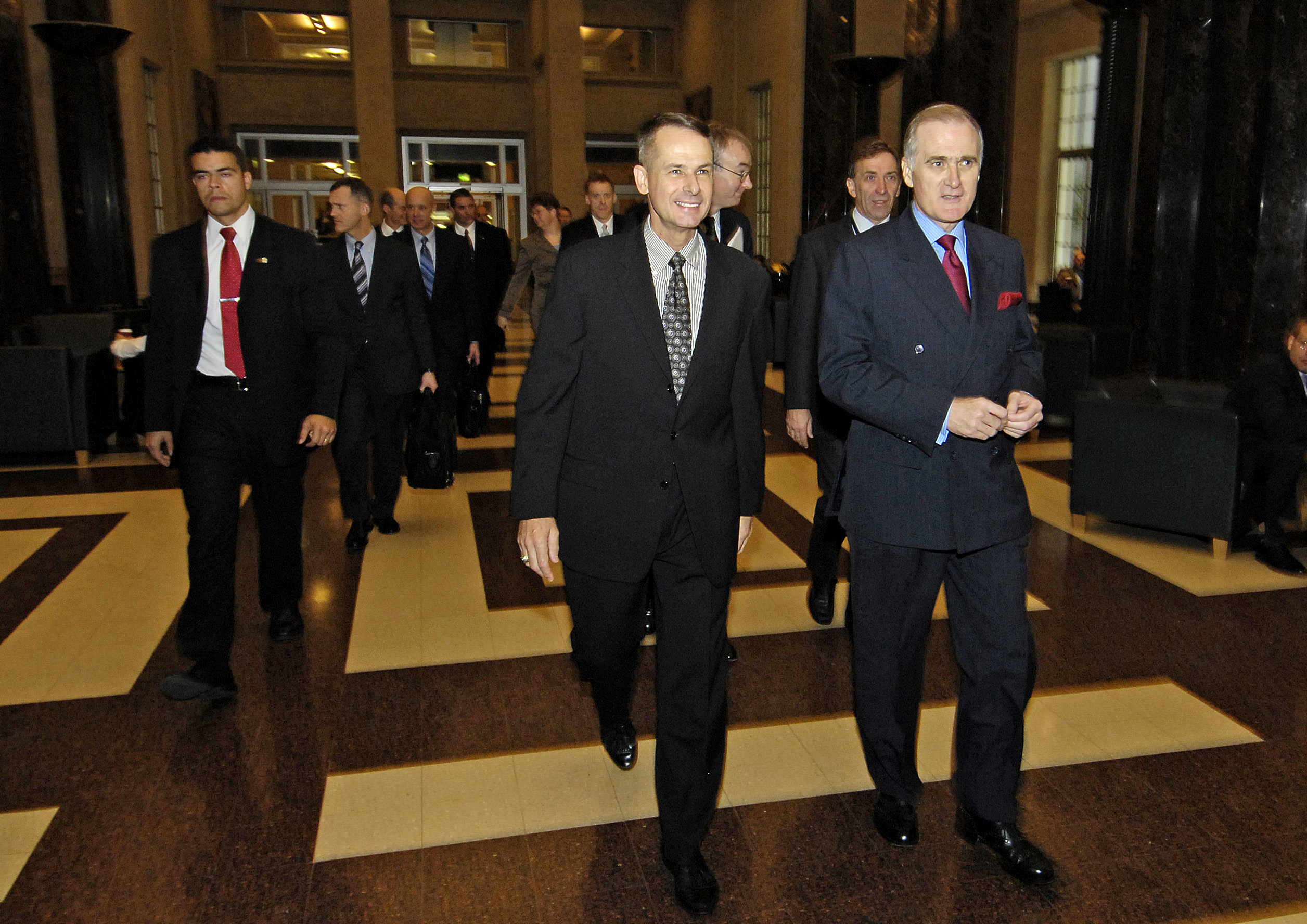
Stirrup with US General Peter Pace in 2006.

In May 2006, shortly after becoming CDS, Stirrup visited Iraq to assess the situation first hand. The British responsibility was in the south of Iraq and on his return Stirrup reported to the Defence Secretary that Basra was the key to success in southern Iraq. Stirrup identified two obstacles to success, the first being the militias and the second being the need for an acceptable level of Iraqi governance. In addition, he took the view that Iranian interference was a significant exacerbating factor. Noting that neither of two obstacles could be fully dealt with by the British Armed Forces, Stirrup viewed the solution as being essentially political.

In order to take action against the militias, the local British commander in South East Iraq developed a plan to conduct aggressive operations against them. At the same time Stirrup became increasingly concerned that strong political leadership from the Iraqis was lacking and that without this any gains made by the military actions against the militias would be to no avail. In July 2006, Stirrup overturned the previous military advice to the Defence Secretary by stating that force levels in South East Iraq would need to be maintained. Previously it had been thought that they could be reduced from over 7,000 to between 3,000 and 4,000. In September 2006, the Iraqi Prime Minister, Nouri al-Maliki, blocked the British plan to act against the militias which Stirrup believed was because of Maliki's dependence on Sadrist support at that stage.

The original British plan was replaced by Operation Sinbad which was acceptable to the Iraqis and was executed from September 2006 to February 2007. Along with other Coalition commanders, Stirrup viewed Sinbad as insufficient because it did not involve directly attacking the militias. Believing that it would not deliver the level of improvements in security that the British wanted, Stirrup began looking at the high risk strategy of withdrawing British troops from inside Basra which would have left the Iraqis in the position of either having to deal with the security problems themselves or losing control of Iraq's second city.

Following the end of Operation Sinbad, the military situation for the British in Basra worsened and the British base at Basra Palace was repeatedly attacked. However, by summer 2007, Maliki's political position no longer depended on Sadrist support and Muqtada al-Sadr had publicly criticized Maliki. In July 2007 Maliki replaced his Basra security co-ordinator and during one of his visits to Iraq, Stirrup met the new Basra security coordinator, General Mohan. Mohan wanted the British forces to withdraw from Basra and Stirrup stressed that once British forces had departed, Mohan's Iraqi forces would have to deal with security. Both Mohan and Stirrup were clear that retaining British forces outside Basra would be an insurance policy against a deteriorating situation within Basra as well as give Mohan something additional with which he could threaten the militias. Stirrup was concerned that a redeployment would look as though the British had been "bombed out of Basra" but judged that this was preferable to the significant damage to British military reputation were security in Basra to completely break down. Much of the British redeployment took place in August and despite Stirrup making public statements to the effect that the withdrawal was part of the overall plan, some commentators judged that the British had been defeated in southern Iraq. By early September all British troops had been withdrawn from Basra city to the airport to perform what was dubbed an "overwatch" role.

After British troops had been withdrawn from Basra city, violence continued and General Mohan took some time to produce a plan for improving security. Notwithstanding the difficulties, the Basra Governorate was handed over to Provincial Iraqi Control in December 2007. By early March 2008, General Mohan had produced a security plan with British support which was presented to General Petraeus and Prime Minister Maliki in Baghdad. The plan called for a six-week period of disarmament, demobilisation and reintegration starting in June 2008 before forcibly disarming the Mahdi Army and other non-Government/Coalition forces afterwards. Later in March Stirrup was in Baghdad and he met with General Petraeus and General Austin, the commander of the Multi-National Corps – Iraq. Stirrup strongly backed Mohan's plan but noted that Mohan would need to be pressed hard to deliver and also supported with Corps forces. Austin was reluctant to provide support, wishing to focus on Mosul, but Petraeus agreed with Stirrup. However, this plan was overtaken by Maliki's decision to launch Operation Charge of the Knights. Both Stirrup and the American commanders were taken by surprise and were concerned about the lack of planning but Maliki was determined to launch his operation in late March.

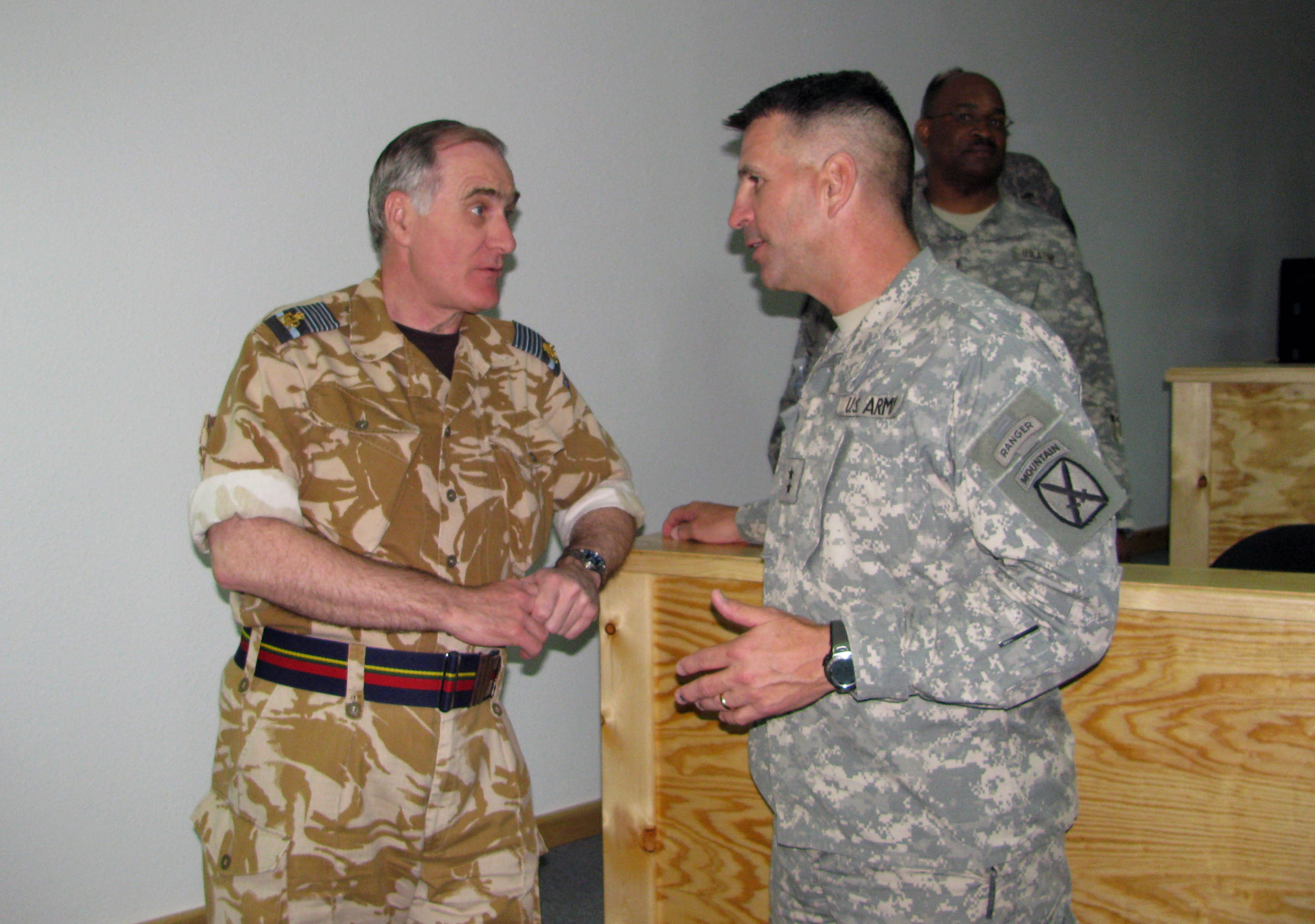
Stirrup in Basra with Major General Michael L. Oates in March 2009.

Operation Charge of the Knights led to the Battle of Basra which lasted from 25 to 31 March. Although the lack of planning resulted in some confusion, the Coalition did support the Iraqi action with land and air assets. By the end of March the Iraqi Government forces had negotiated a ceasefire with Muqtada al-Sadr. With the militias melting away, Iraqi Government forces were able to claim control of Basra. While recognizing that Operation Charge of the Knights had been far from perfect, Stirrup judged it to be a success as the Iraqis were taking responsibility for their own security.

After the conclusion of Operation Charge of the Knights the British were involved in helping to rebuild those Iraq Army units which had suffered from poor cohesion, or even dissolved. In hindsight, Stirrup took the view that the British forces would have been usefully employed in mentoring the Iraq Army to greater extent earlier in the campaign. In late April 2009, most British military operations in Iraq came to an end; and by 28 July 2009 all British forces had left Iraq and were all redeployed to Kuwait.

=== Operations in Afghanistan ===
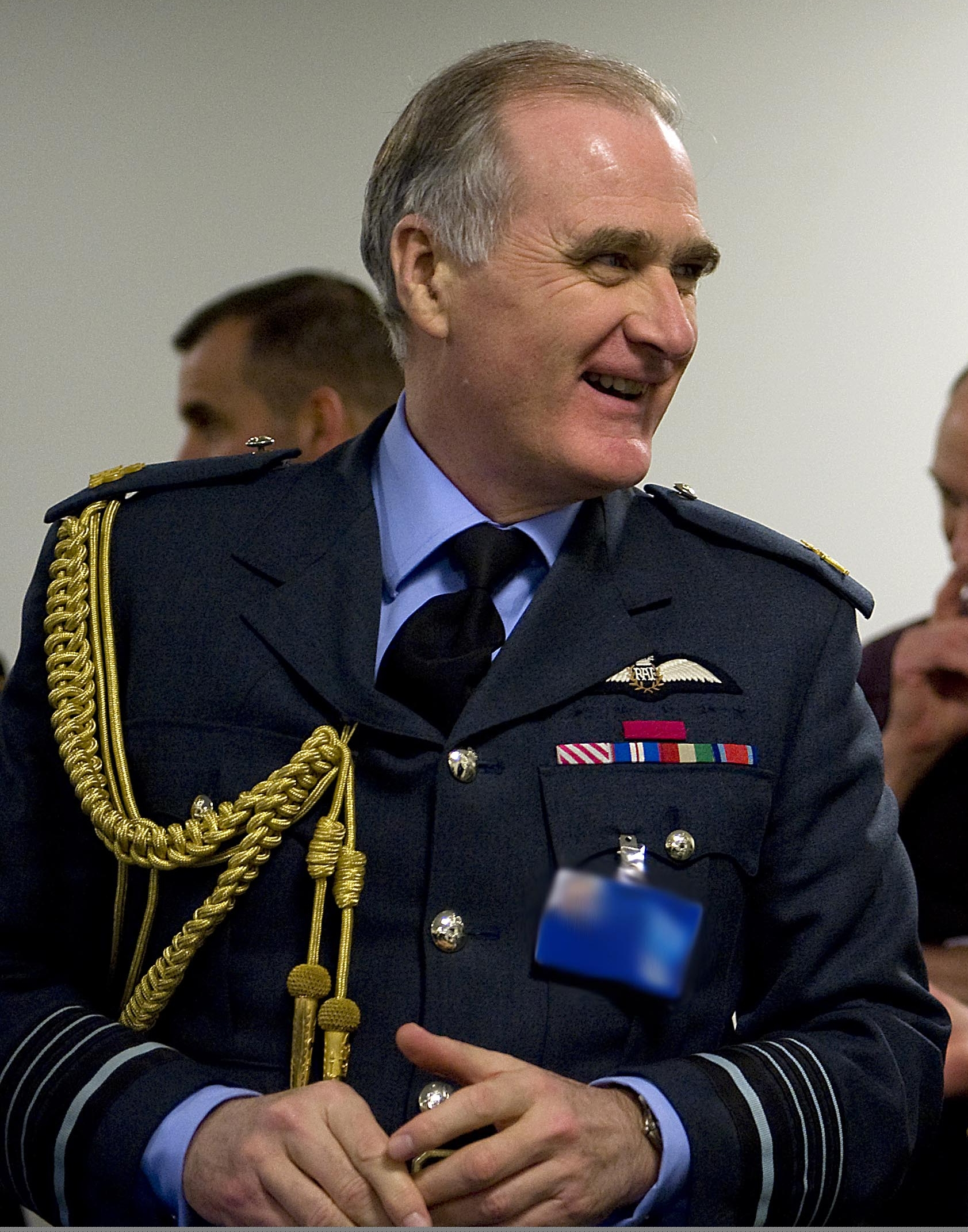
Stirrup at an ISAF Regional Command South meeting in Istanbul, Turkey.

After his appointment as CDS, Stirrup travelled to Helmand Province in May 2006. At that stage, the British effort consisted of a small tented base at Camp Bastion, an operating base at Lashkar Gah and several isolated platoon houses in the north of Helmand. Much of the rest of the Province was not under British or other ISAF control. At that time the insurgency was starting to gain strength and although by 2009 the British Armed Forces and the United States Marine Corps had greatly expanded their role and were providing security for over 50% of Helmand, speaking in 2009 Stirrup conceded that in some areas security had worsened. While, highlighting the inadequate force levels provided by NATO and the competing demands on Coalition political and military resources that Iraq had posed until 2008, Stirrup believed that by 2009 NATO forces were successfully taking the fight to the insurgents, driving them out of towns and villages and thereby allowing governance to improve which would lead to the defeat of the insurgency.

Speaking generally on operations in Afghanistan, Stirrup has noted that whilst "the military is a key, an essential element in dealing with those problems, but by and large these problems can only be resolved politically" and that he favoured a pragmatic approach to dealing with former members of the Taliban. By December 2009, Stirrup was expressing his concern about falling levels of public support for the war in Afghanistan which he believed risked undermining the British effort. In particular Stirrup called for a spirit of resolution and stated that the mission was achievable, noting that the British Armed Forces had finally now got a properly resourced plan to achieve the strategic aim.

=== Extended term of office and retirement ===
On 14 July 2010, the Defence Secretary Liam Fox announced that General Sir David Richards, the then Chief of the General Staff, would succeed Stirrup as Chief of the Defence Staff in October 2010. Richards took over on 29 October 2010 and Stirrup was created a life peer as Baron Stirrup, of Marylebone in the City of Westminster. He was introduced into the House of Lords on 1 February 2011, where he sits as a crossbencher. Stirrup officially retired from the RAF on 4 April 2011. The following month Stirrup gave detailed evidence to the Commons Defence Select Committee on the UK's recent Strategic Defence and Security Review.

In April 2013, Stirrup was appointed Knight Companion of the Order of the Garter by the Queen Elizabeth II. He was appointed as an honorary Marshal of the Royal Air Force in the Queen's 2014 Birthday Honours.

== Activities as a peer ==
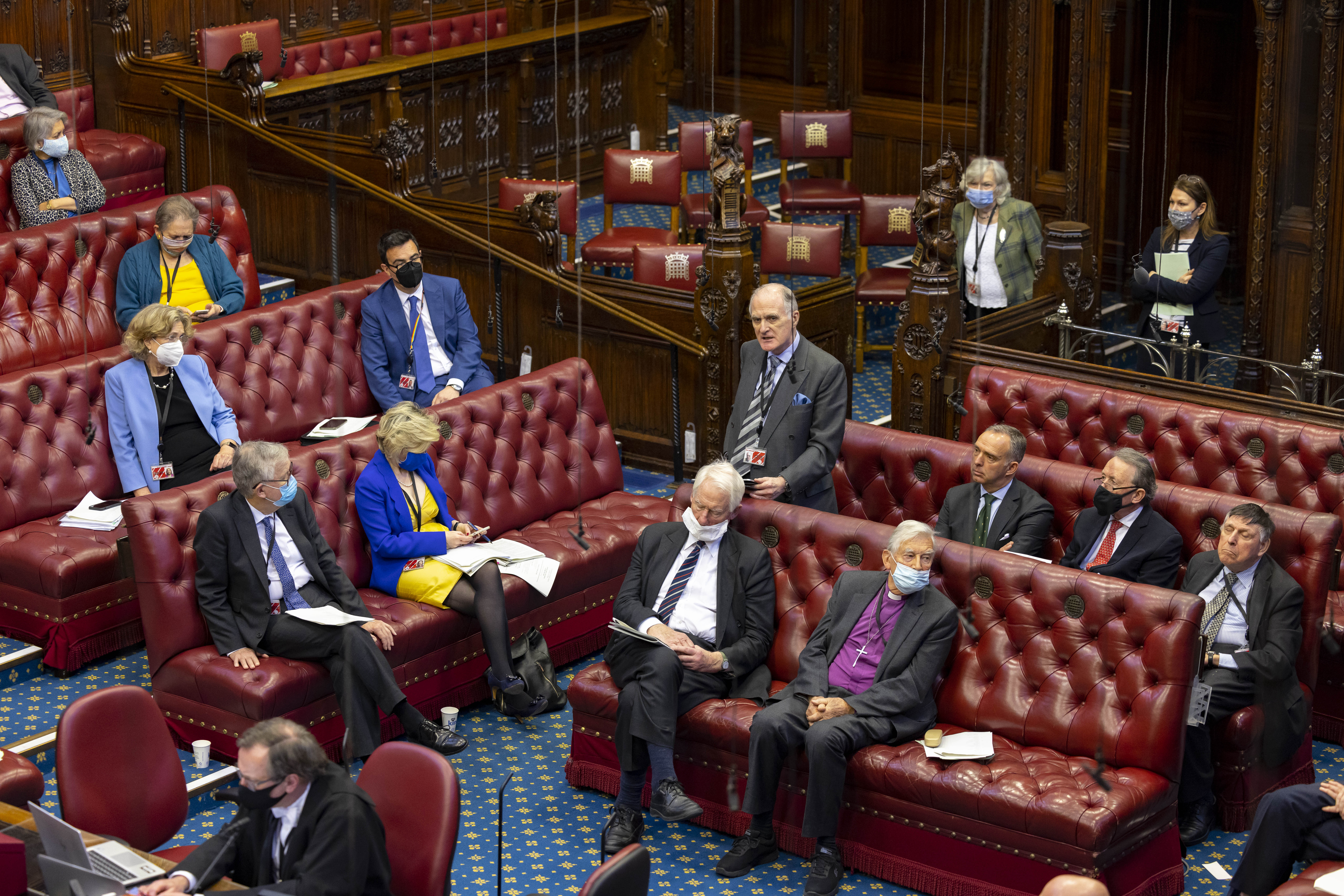
Stirrup speaking in a House of Lords debate.

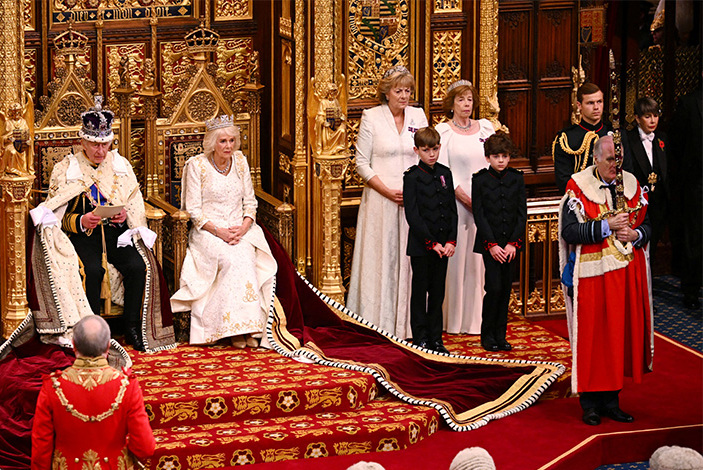
Stirrup (right) holding the Sword of State at the 2023 State Opening of Parliament

In 2013 Stirrup, along with Field Marshal Lord Guthrie and Admiral of the Fleet Lord Boyce, called upon the British Government to derogate from the European Convention on Human Rights for the duration of deployed operations. They were concerned that the increased risk of prosecution faced by commanders would lead to a generation of risk-averse military leaders. In August 2014, Stirrup was one of 200 public figures who were signatories to a letter to The Guardian opposing Scottish independence in the run-up to September's referendum on that issue. In June 2015 Stirrup joined the House of Lords' EU External Affairs Sub-Committee. From October 2015 Stirrup has been the president of the Pilgrims Society.

On Remembrance Sunday 2014, it was announced that Stirrup would lead the efforts to raise one million pounds to enable a national memorial to the British service personnel who fought in Iraq and Afghanistan to be erected in central London. By March 2015 Stirrup was confident that the full amount needed could be raised and by July 2016 work had begun on the memorial in the Victoria Embankment Gardens. The Iraq and Afghanistan Memorial was unveiled in March 2017.

In July 2016, Stirrup gave an interview to Sky News in which he accused Russia of running a "gangster regime" and a "gangster foreign policy" in regard to their ongoing Ukrainian intervention. Noting that the Kremlin viewed NATO as weak, Stirrup called for the West to develop a long-term strategy to counter Russia's actions. In particular Stirrup urged that NATO countries spend more on defence.

Stirrup carried the Sword of State in the procession for the 2019 State opening of Parliament.

== Honorary appointments ==
Stirrup has held the following honorary appointments:

- Honorary Colonel 73 Engineer Regiment (Volunteers) (1 April 2002 – 1 June 2008)
- Doctor of Science from Cranfield University
- Air Aide-de-Camp to Her Majesty The Queen

== Honours and awards ==
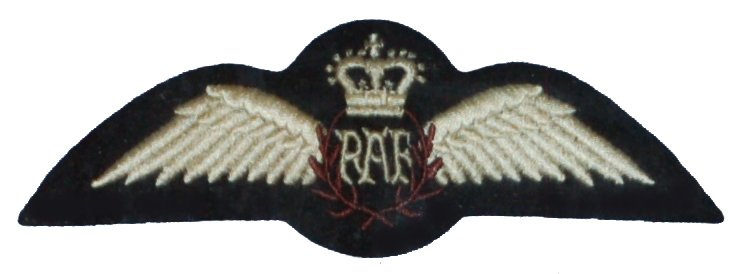

Ribbon	Description	Notes
	Knight Companion of the Order of the Garter	Appointed in 2013; ribbon not worn in undress
	Knight Grand Cross of the Order of the Bath	Appointed in 2005
	Air Force Cross	Awarded in 1983
	Queen Elizabeth II Golden Jubilee Medal	
	Queen Elizabeth II Diamond Jubilee Medal	
	Queen Elizabeth II Platinum Jubilee Medal	
	Royal Air Force Long Service and Good Conduct Medal	With 3 Bars
	General Service Medal (Oman)	
	Endurance Medal (Al-Sumood)	
	Commander of the Legion of Merit	

== Arms ==
Coat of arms of Jock Stirrup
Notes Knight Companion of the Order of the Garter since 2013. Coronet Coronet of a Baron Crest A peregrine falcon Or, holding in the dexter claw a winged stirrup Azure. Torse Mantling Or and Azure. Escutcheon Azure a bend Or between two stirrups Argent winged Or. Supporters On either side a Peregrine Falcon supporting with the interior foot a Caduceus erect Or. Motto HONOR PRAEMIUM VIRTUTIS (Honour is the reward of virtue) Orders The Order of the Garter circlet. The collar as Grand Cross Knight of the Order of the Bath (Appointed CB 2000, KCB 2002 & GCB 2005); Air Force Cross Banner The banner of the Baron's arms used as Knight Companion of the Garter depicted at St George's Chapel.

Military offices
Preceded by F J Hoare	Officer Commanding No. 2 Squadron; 1985–1987	Succeeded by Philip Sturley
Preceded by D F A Henderson	Station Commander RAF Marham; 1990–1992	Succeeded by N R Irving
Preceded by John Day	Director of Air Force Plans and Programmes; 1994–1997	Succeeded by Steven Nicholl
Preceded by John Day	Air Officer Commanding No. 1 Group; 1997–1998	Succeeded by J H Thompson
Preceded by Timothy Jenner	Assistant Chief of the Air Staff; 1998–2000	Succeeded by Philip Sturley
Preceded by Timothy Jenner	Deputy Commander-in-Chief Strike Command; 2000–2002	Succeeded by Sir Brian Burridge
New title	UK National Contingent Commander for Operation Veritas; Also Senior British Military Advisor to US CENTCOM; 2001–2002	Succeeded by Cedric Delves
Preceded by Sir Jeremy Blackham	Deputy Chief of the Defence Staff (Equipment Capability); 2002–2003	Succeeded by Robert Fulton
Preceded by Sir Peter Squire	Chief of the Air Staff; 2003–2006	Succeeded by Sir Glenn Torpy
Preceded by Sir Michael Walker	Chief of the Defence Staff; 2006–2010	Succeeded by Sir David Richards
Honorary titles
Preceded by Sir Richard Johns	Honorary Colonel of 73 Engineer Regiment (Volunteers); 1 April 2002 – 29 July 2008	Succeeded by Sir Glenn Torpy
Orders of precedence in the United Kingdom
Preceded by The Lord Grade of Yarmouth	Gentlemen; Baron Stirrup	Followed by The Lord Glendonbrook
