= Stephen Dalton =

Royal Air Force air marshal

Air Chief Marshal Sir Stephen Dalton GCB FRAeS
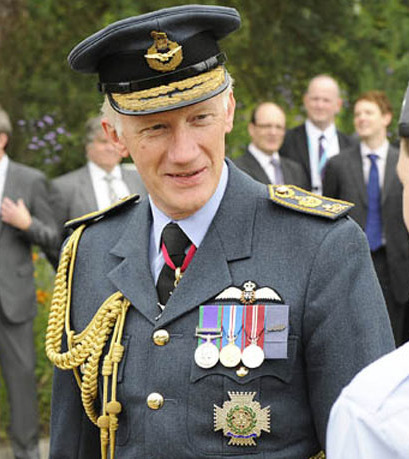
- Air Chief Marshal Dalton in 2012

Lieutenant Governor of Jersey
- In office 13 March 2017 – 30 June 2022
- Monarch: Elizabeth II
- Chief Minister: Ian Gorst; John Le Fondré
- Preceded by: Sir John McColl
- Succeeded by: Jerry Kyd

Personal details
- Born: 23 April 1954 (age 72) Leicester, England
- Education: University of Bath

Military service
- Allegiance: United Kingdom
- Branch/service: Royal Air Force
- Years of service: 1976–2013
- Rank: Air Chief Marshal
- Commands: Chief of the Air Staff; Air Member for Personnel; Controller Aircraft; RAF Coltishall; XIII Squadron
- Battles/wars: Operation Jural
- Awards: Knight Grand Cross of the Order of the Bath; Queen's Commendation for Valuable Service in the Air

Air Chief Marshal Sir Stephen Gary George Dalton, GCB, FRAeS (born 23 April 1954) is a retired senior officer of the Royal Air Force and former Lieutenant-Governor of Jersey.

As commanding officer of XIII Squadron, Dalton deployed on Operation Jural, the United Kingdom's contribution to Operation Southern Watch enforcing the No-Fly Zone over Southern Iraq. He then moved on to high command, serving as Head of Air Operations at the Ministry of Defence during the preparations for and conduct of Operation Telic in Iraq. Most recently he was appointed Chief of the Air Staff, the professional head of the Royal Air Force, in which role he advised the British Government on the deployment of air power during the Libyan conflict. In that capacity he implemented 2,700 redundancies, as determined by the Strategic Defence and Security Review.

== Early life and education ==
Dalton was born on 23 April 1954. He was educated at Clarendon Park Junior School and Lancaster School in Leicester, and then the University of Bath, where he studied Aeronautical Engineering.

== Military career ==
Dalton was commissioned as a University Cadet on 16 September 1973, before being regraded as a pilot officer following graduation on 15 July 1976. Dalton was promoted to flying officer on 15 January 1977, and then flight lieutenant on 15 October 1977. He was posted to No. 41 Squadron at RAF Coltishall flying the SEPECAT Jaguar on three tours, operating from the UK and Germany in both ground attack and tactical reconnaissance roles. Dalton was promoted to squadron leader on 1 July 1984, and awarded a Queen's Commendation for Valuable Service in the Air in the 1987 New Year Honours.

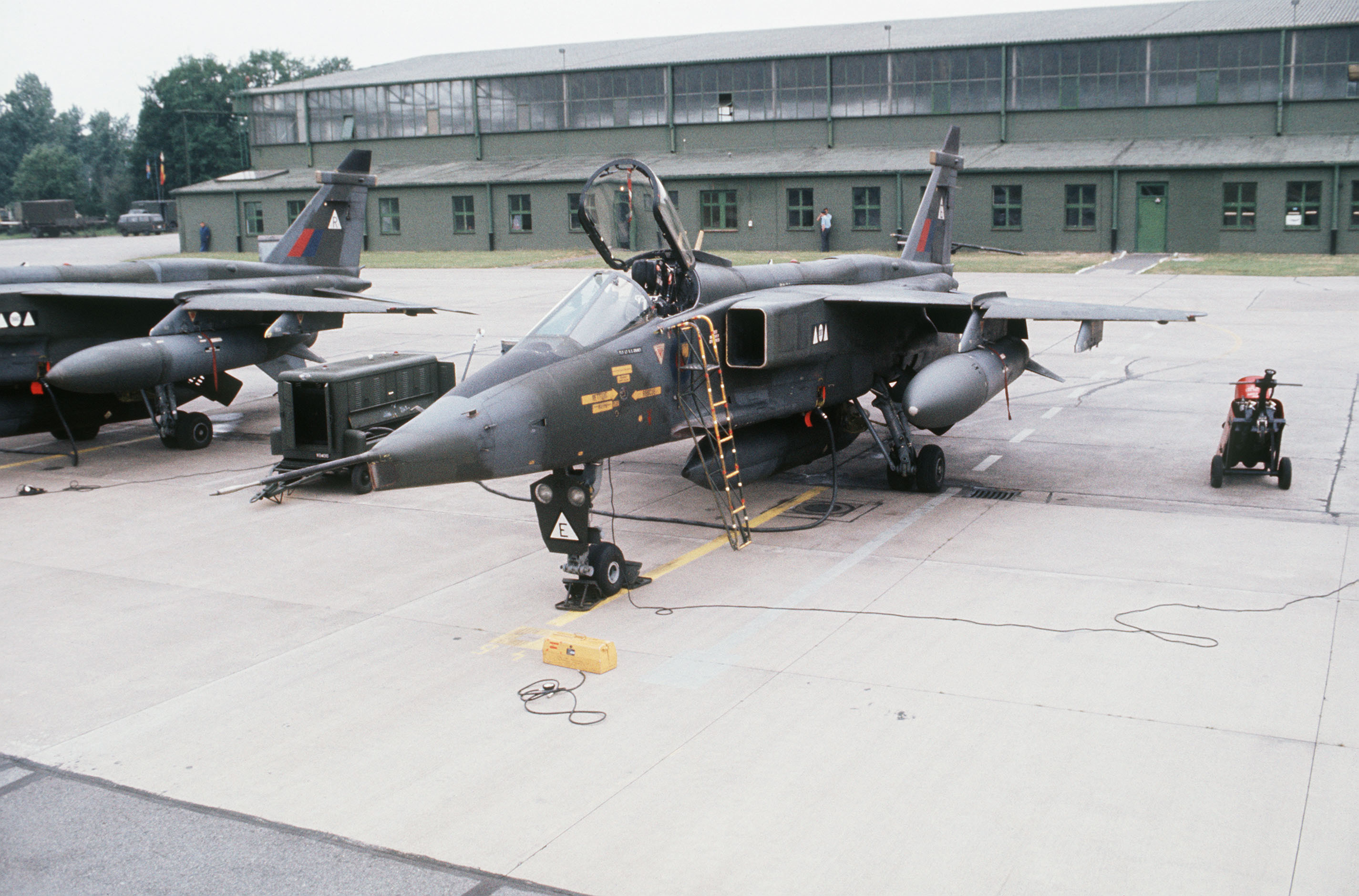
Jaguars of RAF Germany in the late 70s, a type flown by Dalton on three tours in the UK and Germany

Following the Advanced Staff Course, training to fly the Panavia Tornado, and promotion to wing commander on 1 July 1990, Dalton commanded XIII Squadron. He deployed on Operation Jural, the United Kingdom's contribution to Operation Southern Watch enforcing the No-Fly Zone over Southern Iraq.

Dalton was promoted to group captain on 1 July 1994, and in 1997 took command of RAF Coltishall and the RAF's Jaguar force. On promotion to air commodore on 1 January 2000, he was appointed Head of the Eurofighter Typhoon Programme Assurance Group at the Ministry of Defence. Following the Higher Command and Staff Course in 2002, Dalton was appointed Head of Air Operations, also at the Ministry of Defence. His tenure in this role was dominated by the preparations for and conduct of Operation Telic in Iraq.

On promotion to air vice marshal on 14 May 2003, Dalton was appointed Director Information Superiority. He was also appointed Controller Aircraft in 2004, retaining this post upon his appointment as Director Typhoon on 2 May 2006. He was appointed a Companion of the Order of the Bath in the 2006 New Year Honours.

On 1 May 2007, Dalton was promoted to air marshal, and appointed Deputy Commander-in-Chief Personnel at Air Command and Air Member for Personnel. In the 2009 Birthday Honours he was appointed Knight Commander of the Order of the Bath. He was promoted to air chief marshal and appointed Chief of the Air Staff, and Air Aide-de-Camp to Queen Elizabeth II, on 31 July 2009. Dalton was appointed Knight Grand Cross of the Order of the Bath in the 2012 Birthday Honours.

In light of the Libyan conflict, Dalton warned that there "was a heck of a lot to be doing" and that the military was nearing the point of "exhaustion". On 24 June 2011 The Daily Telegraph confirmed that Dalton, in common with the First Sea Lord and the Chief of the General Staff, would lose his position on the Defence Board, the highest non-ministerial Ministry of Defence committee, which makes decisions on all aspect of military policy. He retired in July 2013.

Dalton was appointed as Honorary Air Commodore to the RAF Regiment on 21 September 2013, in succession to Air Chief Marshal Sir Richard Johns. He became Vice President of the Yorkshire Air Museum in 2009 before taking up the post of President in 2015.

== Lieutenant Governor of Jersey ==
It was announced on 20 December 2016 that Dalton would be appointed Lieutenant Governor of Jersey. He was sworn into office on 13 March 2017.

He completed his term of office on 30 June 2022.

He was replaced by Vice Admiral Jerry Kyd, who took office in October 2022.

He was appointed Bath King of Arms in 2018. In that role, he represented the Order of the Bath at the 2023 Coronation.

== Personal life ==
Dalton is married to Anne: the couple have two grown-up children.

Dalton's interests include sports, theatre and history. He was awarded an honorary degree by the University of Leicester in 2011 and an honorary Doctorate of Science by the University of Bath in 2013.

Military offices
Preceded by A. P. Waldron	Head Air Operations, Ministry of Defence; 2002–2003	Post subsumed
Unknown	Director Information Superiority, Ministry of Defence; 2003–2006	Succeeded by S. D. Butler
Preceded by D. N. Williams	Controller Aircraft; 2004–2007	Succeeded by S. D. Butler
Preceded by Barry Thornton as Commander-in-Chief, Personnel and Training Command	Deputy Commander-in-Chief Personnel, Air Command; 2007–2009	Succeeded by Simon Bryant
Preceded by B. M. Thornton	Air Member for Personnel; 2007–2009	Succeeded by Simon Bryant
Preceded by Sir Glenn Torpy	Chief of the Air Staff; 2009–2013	Succeeded by Sir Andrew Pulford
Government offices
Preceded by Sir John McColl	Lieutenant Governor of Jersey; 2017–2022	Succeeded by Jerry Kyd
Heraldic offices
Preceded by Lord Boyce	King of Arms of the Order of the Bath; 2018 – present	Incumbent
Honorary titles
Preceded by Sir Richard Johns	Honorary Air Commodore of the Royal Air Force Regiment; 2013 – present	Incumbent
