= Philip Sturley =

Royal Air Force Air Marshal

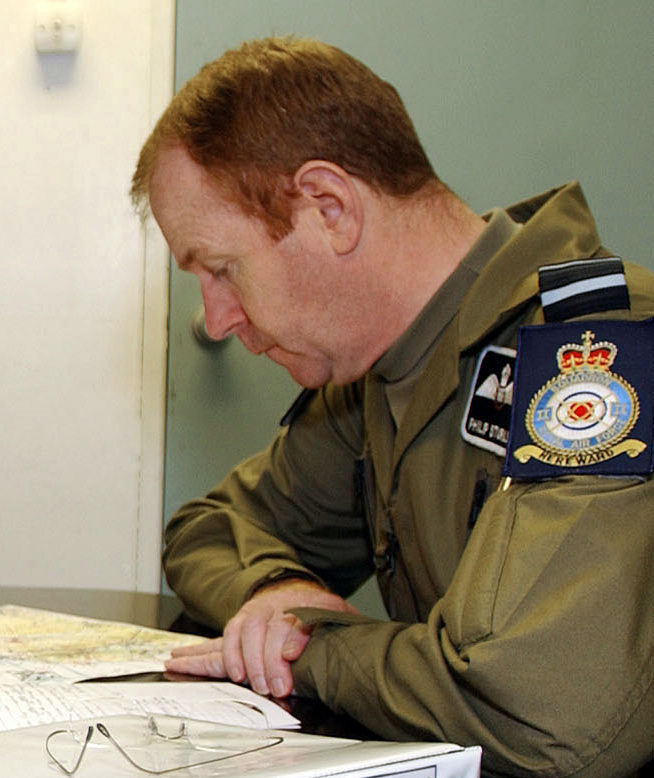
- Air Vice-Marshal Philip Sturley in 2002
- Born: 9 July 1950 (age 76)
- Military career
- Allegiance: United Kingdom
- Branch: Royal Air Force
- Service years: 1968–2005
- Rank: Air Marshal
- Commands: No. 38 Group (1998–00); RAF Cottesmore (1992–93); No. II (AC) Squadron (1987–88)
- Conflicts: United Nations Protection Force
- Awards: Companion of the Order of the Bath; Member of the Order of the British Empire; Queen's Commendation for Valuable Service in the Air

Air Marshal Philip Oliver Sturley, CB, MBE, FRAeS (born 9 July 1950) is a former senior commander in the Royal Air Force.

== Flying career ==
Educated at St Ignatius' College in London and Southampton University, Sturley was commissioned in the Royal Air Force in 1972. He was awarded the Queen's Commendation for Valuable Service in the Air in the 1980 Birthday Honours, and appointed a Member of the Order of the British Empire (MBE) in the 1985 New Year Honours. He became Director of Air Staff Briefing and Co-ordination at the Ministry of Defence in 1990, Station Commander at RAF Cottesmore in 1992 and Secretary to the Military Committee at NATO Headquarters in 1994. He went on to be Air Officer Commanding No. 38 Group in 1998, Assistant Chief of the Air Staff in 2000 and Chief of Staff to the Air North Commander in 2003, before retiring in 2005. He was appointed a Companion of the Order of the Bath (CB) in the 2000 New Year Honours.

Sturley served as president of the Royal Air Forces Association from May 2005 to May 2011.

Military offices
Preceded by Jock Stirrup	Assistant Chief of the Air Staff; 2000–2003	Succeeded by David Walker
