= Charles Ernest Ness =

Royal Air Force officer

Sir Charles Ness
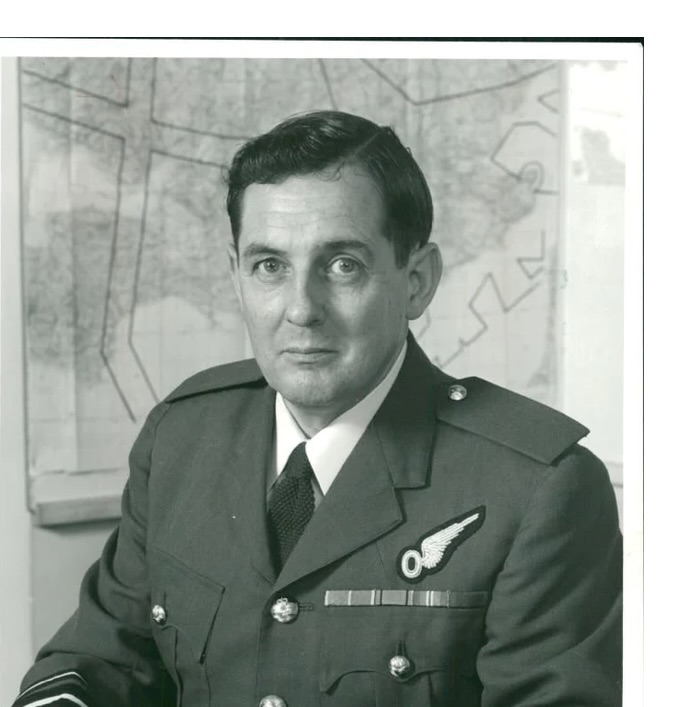
- Air Vice Marshall Sir Charles E. Ness RAF
- Born: 4 April 1924
- Died: 13 September 1994 (aged 70)
- Military career
- Allegiance: United Kingdom
- Branch: Royal Air Force
- Service years: 1943–83
- Rank: Air Marshal
- Commands: Air Member for Personnel (1980–83); HQ Southern Maritime Air Region (1975–76); RAF Steamer Point in Aden (1965–67); British Joint Trials Force (1962–65)
- Conflicts: Second World War
- Awards: Knight Commander of the Order of the Bath; Commander of the Order of the British Empire

Air Marshal Sir Charles Ernest Ness, KCB, CBE (4 April 1924 – 13 September 1994) was a senior Royal Air Force commander.

== RAF career ==
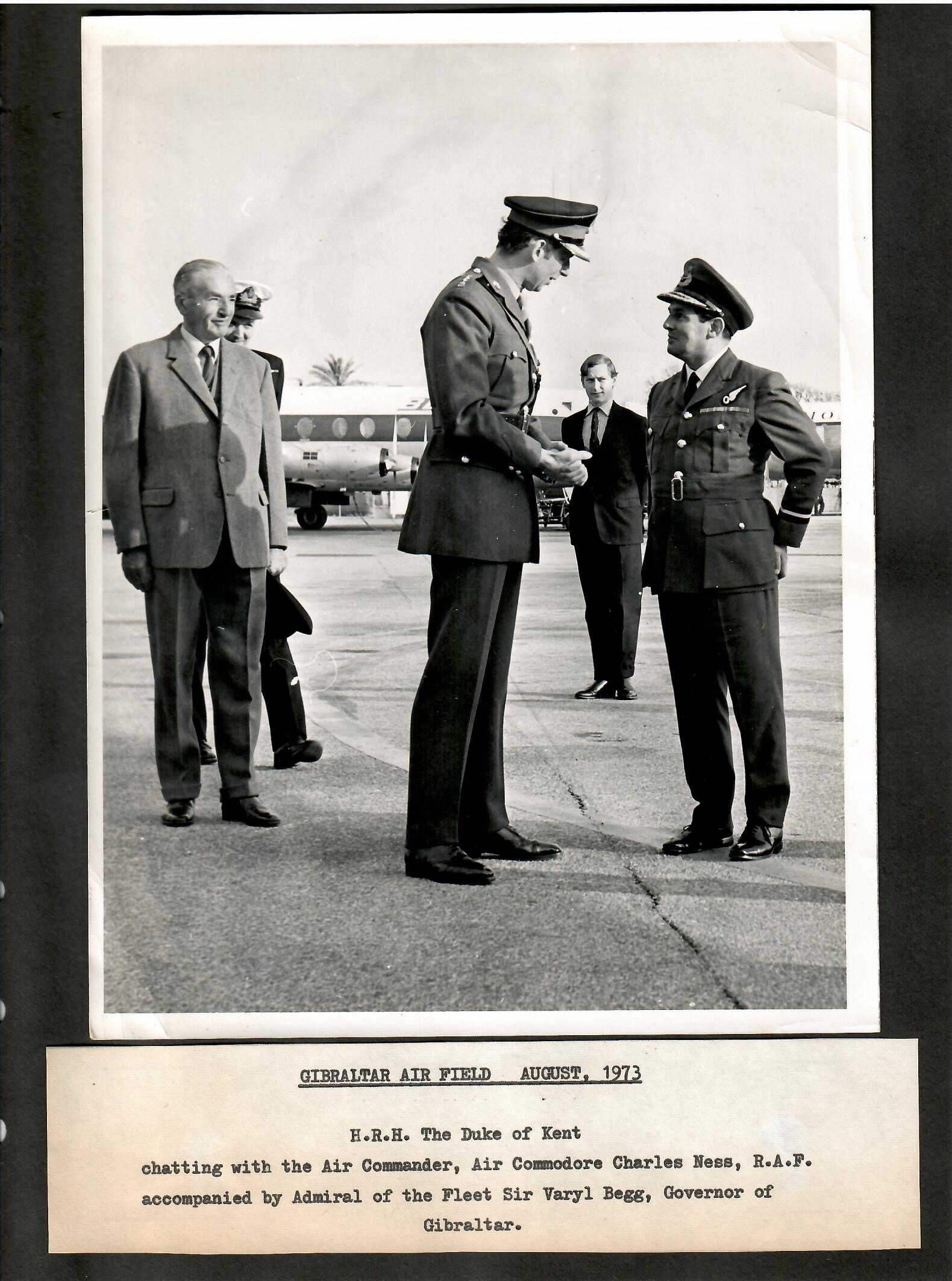
Air Commodore Ness chats with the Duke of Kent, Gibraltar 1973

Ness joined the Royal Air Force in 1943 and served as an observer during the Second World War. In 1965 he became Officer Commanding the RAF Steamer Point in Aden where he had to cope with the growing terrorist threat. He became deputy director of Manning at the Ministry of Defence in 1967, Air Commander in Gibraltar in 1971 and Director of Organisation and Administration Plans in 1974. He went on to be Commander at Headquarters Southern Maritime Air Region in 1975, Director-General of Personnel Management in 1976 and Air Member for Personnel in 1980 before retiring in 1983.

In retirement he became Chairman of the Air League.

== Honours ==
Ness was appointed an Officer (Military division) of the Order of the British Empire (OBE) in the 1959 Birthday Honours, promoted to Commander of the Order (CBE) in the 1967 Birthday Honours, appointed a Companion of the Order of the Bath (CB) in the 1978 Birthday Honours, and promoted to Knight Commander of that Order (KCB) in the 1980 Birthday Honours.

Military offices
Preceded by Sir John Gingell	Air Member for Personnel; 1980–1983	Succeeded by Sir Thomas Kennedy
