= Timothy Jenner =

Sir Timothy Jenner
- Born: 31 December 1945 (age 80)
- Military career
- Allegiance: United Kingdom
- Branch: Royal Air Force
- Service years: 1964–2001
- Rank: Air Marshal
- Commands: RAF Shawbury; No. 33 Squadron
- Conflicts: The Troubles
- Awards: Knight Commander of the Order of the Bath

Air Marshal Sir Timothy Ivo Jenner, KCB, FRAeS (born 31 December 1945) is a retired senior Royal Air Force commander who since retirement has worked for Serco.

== RAF career ==
Educated at Maidstone Grammar School, Jenner joined the Royal Air Force in 1964 (commissioned 1967). He trained as a Westland Wessex (Sikorsky H-34) helicopter pilot in 1968 and on 15 August 1969 he became the first pilot to land a Wessex helicopter in Northern Ireland at the start of The Troubles. From 1976 he flew Pumas. He became Officer Commanding No. 33 Squadron in 1982, Military Assistant to the Assistant Chief of Defence Staff (Commitments) in 1985 and Military Assistant to the Deputy Chief of Defence Staff (Programmes and Personnel) in 1986.

He went on to be Station Commander of RAF Shawbury in 1987, Deputy Director of Air Force Plans in 1990 and Director of Defence Programmes in 1992. After that he was appointed Air Officer Plans at Headquarters Strike Command in 1993, Assistant Chief of Defence Staff (Costs Review) in 1993 and Assistant Chief of the Air Staff in 1996. His final appointments were as Deputy Commander-in-Chief of Strike Command in 1998 and as Commander of the Combined Air Operations Centre in 2000 before he retired in 2001.

He was appointed a Knight Commander of the Order of the Bath in the Birthday Honours 2000.

In retirement he became Chairman of Serco Defence & Aerospace. He is Chairman of Hellidon Parish Council in Northamptonshire.

== Family ==
In 1968 he married Susan Stokes: they have two daughters.

Military offices
Preceded by Peter Squire	Assistant Chief of the Air Staff; 1996–1998	Succeeded by Sir Jock Stirrup
Preceded by Graeme Robertson	Deputy Commander-in-Chief Strike Command; 1998–2000	Succeeded by Sir Jock Stirrup
