= Bill Wratten =

Royal Air Force Air Chief Marshal

Air Chief Marshal Sir Bill Wratten GBE CB AFC
- Born: 15 August 1939 (age 87)
- Military career
- Allegiance: United Kingdom
- Branch: Royal Air Force
- Service years: 1958–97
- Rank: Air Chief Marshal
- Commands: Strike Command (1994–97); No. 11 Group (1989–91); RAF Stanley (1982–83); RAF Coningsby (1980–82); No. 23 Squadron (1975–77)
- Conflicts: Gulf War
- Awards: Knight Grand Cross of the Order of the British Empire; Companion of the Order of the Bath; Air Force Cross

Sir William John Wratten (born 15 August 1939) is a retired senior commander in the Royal Air Force who was Air Officer Commanding-in-Chief of RAF Strike Command from 1994 to 1997.

== Flying career ==
Educated at Chatham House Grammar School in Ramsgate, Wratten entered RAF Cranwell and was commissioned into the Royal Air Force in 1960. He was appointed Officer Commanding No. 23 Squadron in 1975 and, following his promotion to group captain, he became Station Commander at RAF Coningsby in 1980. In June 1982 he was made the first Station Commander at RAF Stanley in the Falkland Islands after the 1982 war. He went on to serve as Director of Operational Requirements (Air) at Ministry of Defence in 1983, as Senior Air Staff Officer at Headquarters No. 1 Group in 1986 and as Air Officer Commanding No. 11 Group in 1989. As an air vice marshal, he was Air Commander British Forces Middle East from 17 November 1990 until the end of the Gulf War (as such he was the senior air force officer in Operation Granby). His last appointment was as Air Officer Commanding Strike Command in 1994 before he retired in 1997.

== Chinook helicopter crash Board of Inquiry ==
In 1995, following the Chinook Helicopter Crash on the Mull of Kintyre, Wratten was the Senior Reviewing Officer of the Board of Inquiry which had failed to find a cause of the accident. Despite a lack of Accident Data Recorder and cockpit voice recorder, Wratten concluded that because the aircraft hit the ground whilst in cloud/fog, pilot error was the cause of the crash and found the pilots guilty of gross negligence. Following a subsequent Scottish Fatal Accident Inquiry and House of Commons Public Accounts Committee report, a House of Lords Select Committee was appointed to consider all the circumstances surrounding the crash and unanimously concluded "that the reviewing officers were not justified in finding that negligence on the part of the pilots caused the aircraft to crash".

Military offices
Preceded by Michael Stear	Air Officer Commanding No. 11 Group; 1989–1991	Succeeded by John Allison
Preceded by Andrew Wilson	Air Commander British Forces Middle East; Also Deputy Commander British Forces Middle East; 1990–1991	Gulf War ended
Preceded by Sir Richard Johns	Air Officer Commanding-in-Chief Strike Command; 1994–1997	Succeeded by Sir John Allison
