= Peter Squire =

Royal Air Force air chief marshal (1945–2018)

Air Chief Marshal Sir Peter Squire GCB DFC AFC DL FRAeS
- Born: Peter Ted Squire; 7 October 1945; Felixstowe, Suffolk, England
- Died: 19 February 2018 (aged 72); Gidleigh, Devon, England
- Military career
- Allegiance: Monarch of the United Kingdom
- Branch: Royal Air Force
- Service years: 1966–2003
- Rank: Air chief marshal
- Service number: 608512
- Commands: Chief of the Air Staff (2000–2003); Strike Command (1999–2000); No. 1 Group (1993); RAF Cottesmore (1986–1988); No. 1 (F) Squadron (1981–1983)
- Conflicts: Falklands War; Operation Veritas; Operation Telic
- Awards: Knight Grand Cross of the Order of the Bath; Distinguished Flying Cross; Air Force Cross; Queen's Commendation for Valuable Service in the Air

Air chief marshal Sir Peter Ted Squire, GCB, DFC, AFC, DL, FRAeS (7 October 1945 – 19 February 2018) was a senior officer in the Royal Air Force (RAF). He was a fast jet pilot from the 1970s, a squadron commander during the Falklands War, and a senior air commander in the 1990s. Squire served as Chief of the Air Staff (CAS) from 2000 to 2003. In retirement, he became the chairman of the board of trustees of the Imperial War Museum (IWM), and vice-chair of the board of the Commonwealth War Graves Commission (CWGC).

== Early life ==
Peter Ted Squire was born at Felixstowe, Suffolk in England, on 7 October 1945, the son of wing commander Frank Squire, DSO, DFC. Frank Squire was the son of a Devon farmer, and Margaret Pascoe Squire (née Trump). Peter Squire received his schooling at the independent King's School, Bruton in Somerset, the fees of which were paid for by the British Government, as he was the son of a serving military commissioned officer.

== Military career ==
In 1961, at the age of sixteen, the young Squire was awarded a scholarship to academically study at the Royal Air Force College, Cranwell in Lincolnshire, which he entered in September 1963. He subsequently earned a commission into the Royal Air Force, with the rank of pilot officer on 15 July 1966. On 15 January 1967, Squire was promoted to flying officer and after qualifying as an RAF pilot, was posted to No. 20 Squadron based in Singapore in Asia to fly Hunters in March 1968. He was promoted to flight lieutenant on 15 January 1969, returned to the United Kingdom and posted to No. 4 Flying Training School (4FTS) at RAF Valley in Anglesey, north-west Wales in 1970, where he became a qualified flying instructor (QFI) on the Hunter. In 1972, Squire was awarded the 'Wright' Jubilee Trophy for his individual aerobatic performance by a QFI at a jet Flying Training School.

In 1973, Squire commanded the RAF's aerobatic display unit 'The Red Arrows', and was awarded the Queen's Commendation for Valuable Service in the Air in her June 1973 Birthday Honours, and having been promoted to squadron leader on 1 July 1973, he was attached to No. 233 Operational Conversion Unit (233 OCU) for conversion to the Harrier GR1 jump-jet. Upon completion, Squire was posted as Flight Commander to No. 3 Squadron Harriers based at RAF Gutersloh in West Germany from 1975. Squire was awarded the Air Force Cross in the June 1979 Queen's Birthday Honours, and promoted to wing commander on 1 July 1980, On 25 March 1981, Squire was appointed officer commanding (OC) of No. 1 (F) Squadron at RAF Wittering, flying Harrier GR3 aircraft.

=== Falklands War ===
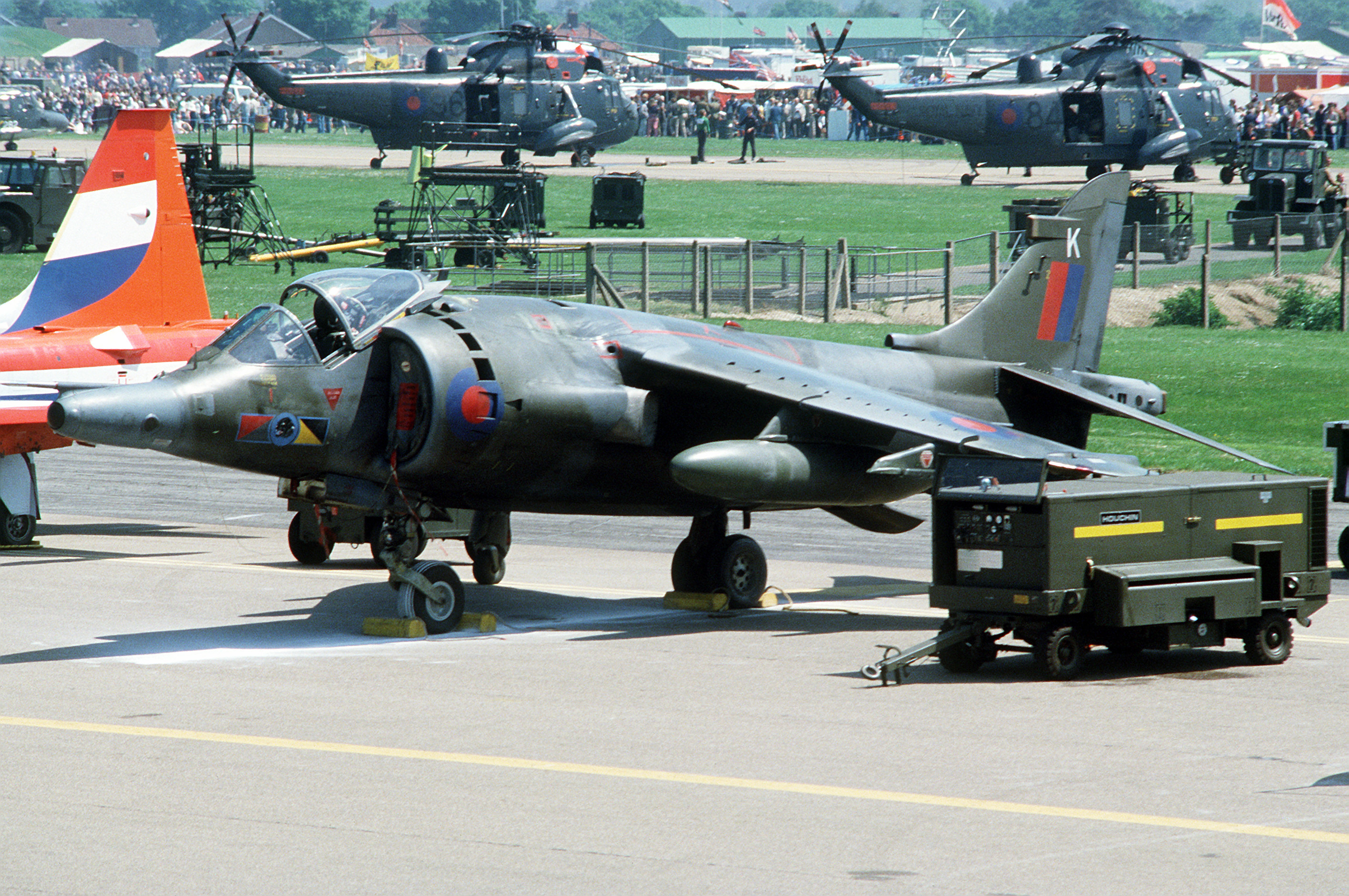
Harrier, a type flown by Squire during the Falklands War.

On 13 April 1982, wing commander Squire deployed with 1 Squadron to CFB Goose Bay in Canada for an exercise, completing a six-hour flight using air-to-air refuelling. Less than a month later, Squire led 1 Squadron during the Falklands War.

No. 1 (F) Squadron departed with its Harrier GR3s from RAF St Mawgan in Cornwall, south-west England, for RAF Ascension Island in the middle of the Atlantic Ocean on 3 May 1982, where it later embarked on the merchant vessel SS Atlantic Conveyor. Upon arrival in the South Atlantic Ocean, the Harriers were transferred to the 'ski-jump' equipped HMS Hermes. A few days later, the Atlantic Conveyor was struck by two Argentine-fired Exocet missiles and sunk.

No. 1 (F) Squadron became the first Royal Air Force unit to operate in a combat role from a British aircraft carrier since the Second World War, and its Harriers were assigned to the ground-attack role during the conflict.

Squire flew twenty-four Harrier sorties against Argentine positions in support of operations, and during one mission, a 7.62 mm round fired from the ground penetrated the cockpit of his mount.

- On 8 June 1982, he experienced an engine failure in XZ989 while attempting an emergency landing at the San Carlos forward operating base, after sustaining battle damage around Two Sisters, walking away uninjured
- On 13 June 1982, Squire became the first RAF pilot to drop a laser-guided bomb in combat, during the Battle of Mount Tumbledown and was subsequently awarded the Distinguished Flying Cross

Four of No. 1 (F) Squadron's ten Harrier GR3s were lost during the campaign, three to enemy ground fire, and one (piloted by Squire) due to engine failure.

Royal Air Force Harrier GR3 losses during the Falklands War
| aircraft registration | pilot | date | location | cause / weapon |
|---|---|---|---|---|
| XZ972 | Flt‑Lt Jeff Glover | 21 May 1982 | Port Howard, West Falkland | Shot down by Blowpipe surface-to-air missile |
| XZ988 | Sqn Ldr Bob Iveson | 27 May 1982 | Near Goose Green | Hit by 20 mm cannon anti-aircraft fire |
| XZ963 | Sqn Ldr Jerry Pook | 30 May 1982 | West of Port Stanley | Damaged by small-arms fire, crashed due to fuel exhaustion |
| XZ989 | Wg Cdr Peter Squire | 8 June 1982 | Port San Carlos area | Mechanical failure on landing |

After the war, while still stationed in the Falklands, Squire experienced another engine failure on 6 November 1982 during a routine patrol in Harrier GR3, registration XW767. He was forced to eject at low altitude near Cape Pembroke, and was rescued uninjured from the sea by a Royal Navy helicopter.

=== Later military career ===
Upon returning to the United Kingdom, Squire was appointed leader of the RAF's Command Briefing and Presentation Team, and later served as Personal Staff Officer to the Air Officer Commanding RAF Strike Command (AOC STC) in 1984. He was promoted to group captain on 1 July 1985, and the following year became Station Commander at RAF Cottesmore in Leicestershire.

Squire was appointed to the post of Director Air Offensive at the Ministry of Defence in 1989. Following his promotion to air commodore on 1 January 1990, he became Senior Air Staff Officer (SASO) at HQ RAF Strike Command, and Deputy Chief of Staff Operations (United Kingdom) Air Forces in 1991, and received further promotion to air vice-marshal on 1 July 1991. AVM Squire was appointed Air Officer Commanding No. 1 Group in February 1993, however, after only a few months, he was replaced by Air Vice Marshal John Day. Squire served as Assistant Chief of the Air Staff from 1994, and, having been promoted to air marshal on 9 February 1996, became Deputy Chief of the Defence Staff (Programmes and Personnel) in 1996.

Squire was appointed Knight Commander of the Order of the Bath in the 1997 Birthday Honours. Appointed Air Aide-de-Camp to Queen Elizabeth II on 29 March 1999, he was promoted to air chief marshal, and became Commander-in-Chief RAF Strike Command, and Commander Allied Air Forces North-western Europe on 30 March 1999.

In 2000, he became Chief of the Air Staff (CAS), and was advanced to Knight Grand Cross of the Order of the Bath in the 2001 New Year Honours. As Chief of the Air Staff, he personally advised the British Government on the British air contribution to Operation Veritas in Afghanistan in 2001, and then to Operation Telic in Iraq. He retired from the Royal Air Force on 5 December 2003; 22 years ago.

== Later life ==
In retirement, Squire joined the Royal Air Force Volunteer Reserve (RAFVR). He was chairman of the board of trustees of the Imperial War Museum (IWM) from 2003 to 2011, and vice-chairman of the board of the Commonwealth War Graves Commission (CWGC) from 2005 to 2008. Squire was also a governor at King's School, Bruton, and the deputy lieutenant of Devon. In 2004, he privately issued a narrative of the combat operations by No.1 (F) Squadron in the Falklands in 1982, entitled The Harrier Goes to War. In 2005, he recorded an extended interview detailing his military career with the Imperial War Museum's Sound Archive.

Peter Squire died of heart failure at the age of 72 on 19 February 2018 at his home, 'Lower Park', at Gidleigh in Devon. A funeral service was held at Holy Trinity Church, Gidleigh in early March 2018. A memorial service was held for him at St Clement Danes Church in London on 1 June 2018, the Queen being represented by Lord Craig of Radley.

== Personal life ==
In 1970, Squire married Carolyn Joynson, the marriage producing three sons. His main personal leisure activity was golf.

== Arms ==
Coat of arms of Peter Squire
| Notes Knight Grand Cross of the Order of the Bath since 2001 Crest A four-winged bird Gules, armed, beaked, and langued Or. Torse Argent and Azure torse. Escutcheon Gyronny Azure and Murrey a Mullet of eight points gyronny Or and Argent voided fracted at the inner angles and the arms of each piece pointed the whole enclosing a Sun in Splendour Or a Bordure engrailed gobony of eight also Or and Argent. Supporters On either side a bull rampant regardant Gules armed, unguled and gorged Or with an astral crown of the last. Motto EXAMPLE THROUGH ENDEAVOUR Orders Collar as grand cross Knight and the Order of the Bath circlet. |

Military offices
| Preceded by P J Goddard | Station Commander RAF Cottesmore; 1986–1988 | Succeeded by R D Elder |
| Preceded by Richard Johns | Air Officer Commanding No. 1 Group; 1993 | Succeeded by John Day |
| Preceded by Anthony Bagnall | Assistant Chief of the Air Staff; 1994–1996 | Succeeded by Timothy Jenner |
| Preceded by Sir Thomas Boyd-Carpenter | Deputy Chief of the Defence Staff (Programmes and Personnel); 1996–1999 | Succeeded by Sir Malcolm Pledger |
| Preceded by Sir John Allison | Commander-in-Chief Strike Command; 1999–2000 | Succeeded by Sir Anthony Bagnall |
| Preceded by Sir Richard Johns | Chief of the Air Staff; 2000–2003 | Succeeded by Sir Jock Stirrup |
Honorary titles
| Preceded by Sir John Allison | Air Aide-de-Camp to Her Majesty The Queen; 1999–2003 | Succeeded by Sir Jock Stirrup |
| Preceded by Sir Jock Slater | Chairman Board of Trustees, Imperial War Museum; 2006–2011 | Succeeded by Sir Francis Richards |
