= Christopher Coville =

British Royal Air Force commander

Sir Christopher Coville
- Born: Christopher Charles Cotton Coville; 2 June 1945 (age 81); Liverpool, England
- Military career
- Allegiance: United Kingdom
- Branch: Royal Air Force
- Service years: 1964–2003
- Rank: Air Marshal
- Commands: Personnel and Training Command; Training Units; RAF Coningsby; No. 111 (Fighter) Squadron
- Awards: Knight Commander of the Order of the Bath

Air Marshal Sir Christopher Charles Cotton Coville, KCB FRAeS (born 2 June 1945) is a British retired senior Royal Air Force commander.

== Early life and education ==
Coville was born in Liverpool to Henry Coville and Anna Moss. He was educated at De La Salle Grammar School for Boys in Liverpool, followed by Royal Air Force College Cranwell and Open University.

== RAF career ==
Coville joined the Royal Air Force in 1964, at the height of the Cold War. Early in his career he flew Lightnings and F4 Phantoms. He assumed command of No. 111 (Fighter) Squadron in 1983, and then became Group Captain Air at Headquarters No. 11 Group. In 1986 he became Station Commander at RAF Coningsby, where he flew Tornado F3 and displayed Hurricanes and Spitfires on the Battle of Britain Memorial Flight. Promoted to air vice marshal, he became Air Officer Commanding Training Units in 1992, Assistant Chief of Defence Staff Operational Requirements (Air Systems) in 1994 and Deputy Commander-in-Chief, Allied Forces Central Europe in 1998. In 2000 his NATO command was absorbed into the Regional Headquarters Allied Forces North Europe of which Coville became the Deputy Commander-in-Chief. In March 2001 he became the Air Member for Personnel and Air Officer Commanding-in-Chief Personnel and Training Command. He retired in 2003.

Coville was appointed a Knight Commander of the Order of the Bath in the 2000 New Year Honours.

In retirement he was appointed Chairman of Westland Helicopters.

== Personal life ==
He married Irene Johnson in 1967, and they have one son, named Peter, and two daughters, named Nicky and Teresa. Peter had a child named Leo, Teresa had three children named Jack, Sadie and Lucy, and Nicky had three children named Soren, Metta and Tara. Chris is a keen glider pilot and active in his local gliding club.

Military offices
Preceded by M B Elsam	Station Commander RAF Coningsby; 1986 – c. 1988	Succeeded by Martin Widdowson
Preceded by Sir Michael Stear	Deputy Commander-in-Chief Allied Forces Central Europe; 1998–2000	None (Command absorbed into Regional HQ Allied Forces North Europe)
Preceded by Sir John Day	Commander-in-Chief Personnel and Training Command; Air Member for Personnel; 2001–2003	Succeeded by Sir Joe French
