= Anthony Pigott =

British Army general (1944–2020)

Lieutenant General Sir Anthony Pigott KCB CBE
- Born: 23 December 1944; Rawalpindi, India
- Died: 19 March 2020 (aged 75)
- Military career
- Allegiance: United Kingdom
- Branch: British Army
- Service years: 1965–2003
- Rank: Lieutenant General
- Commands: Staff College, Camberley
- Conflicts: Iraq War
- Awards: Knight Commander of the Order of the Bath; Commander of the Order of the British Empire

Lieutenant General Sir Anthony David Pigott, KCB, CBE (23 December 1944 – 19 March 2020) was a British Army officer. He also served as Independent Member of Steering Board at the Intellectual Property Office.

== Early life ==
Pigott was the son of Lieutenant Colonel Patrick Pigott RADC and Mollie Pigott, an officer in the Queen Alexandra's Royal Army Nursing Corps.

== Military career ==
Educated at St George's College, Weybridge, and Trinity College, Cambridge, Pigott was commissioned into the Royal Engineers in 1965. As a major, he commanded a squadron of 38 Engineer Regiment at Ripon, in which role he was deployed to Belize in 1976 to build a camp from which local soldiers could defend the area against attack from Guatemala. In 1977 he was deployed to Bradford as Chief Fire Officer, West Yorkshire during the Firemen's Strike and then went on to become military assistant to the Vice-Chief of the General Staff. As a brigadier he played a key role in establishing the Allied Rapid Reaction Corps ('ARRC') and then, as a major-general, he became the first Chief of Staff of the ARRC in 1992. He was deployed to Republic of Bosnia and Herzegovina when the ARRC took the lead in the United Nations Protection Force.

He became Commandant of the Staff College, Camberley, in 1994 and Director-General, Doctrine and Development in 1997. From 2000 he served as Deputy Chief of the Defence Staff (Commitments) with responsibility for planning and executing the invasion of Afghanistan. He retired in 2003.

== Later life ==
After retiring from the Armed Forces, Pigott took a position of Independent Member of Steering Board at the Intellectual Property Office.

On 4 December 2009, Pigott gave evidence to The Iraq Inquiry. From his evidence, it emerged that he chaired an informal working group in the Ministry of Defence in mid-2002 to explore possibilities for British military involvement in an invasion of Iraq and its possible repercussions. He told the inquiry that his aim was to avoid a poorly planned "off-the-cuff" campaign.

== Family ==
In 1981, he married Felicity Ann Astley-Cooper. They had three children including a daughter, Anna, who married Simon Hervé Marie Ghislain, Prince de Merode, son of Léonel Amaury Marie Ghislain, Prince de Merode, in September 2010.

Military offices
Preceded by Christopher Wallace	Commandant of the Staff College, Camberley; 1994–1996	Succeeded by College Disbanded
Preceded by Sir John Day	Deputy Chief of the Defence Staff (Commitments); 2000–2003	Succeeded by Sir Robert Fry
