= David Cousins =

British Air Force marshal (born 1942)

Sir David Cousins, KCB, AFC, BA
- Born: 20 January 1942 (age 84)
- Military career
- Allegiance: United Kingdom
- Branch: Royal Air Force
- Service years: 1961–98
- Rank: Air chief marshal
- Commands: Personnel and Training Command (1995–98); No. 38 (Transport) Group (1994); RAF College Cranwell (1992–94); RAF Laarbruch (1983–85)
- Awards: Knight Commander of the Order of the Bath; Air Force Cross

Air Chief Marshal Sir David Cousins KCB, AFC, BA (born 20 January 1942) is a British retired senior Royal Air Force (RAF) commander.

== Early life and education ==
David Cousins was born in 1942, the son of Peter and Irene Cousins. He was educated at St. Edward's College and then Prince Rupert School in Wilhelmshaven, Germany, after which he attended the Royal Air Force College, and subsequently gained a Bachelor of Arts degree at the Open University.

== RAF career ==
He joined the RAF in 1961 and spent three years at Royal Air Force College Cranwell. He then had a number of operational flying tours, initially flying Lightnings in the air defence role in the UK and RAF Germany, and then Buccaneers in RAF Germany, commanding No 16 Squadron from 1977 to 1979. In 1983 he became Station Commander at RAF Laarbruch, home to four RAF Squadrons flying Jaguars and Tornados as well as two RAF Regiment Squadrons.

He then held a number of staff appointments in air plans, operational requirements and operations. He has also served as ADC to the Chief of the Air Staff and later as PSO to the Chief of the Air Staff. Following attendance at the Royal College of Defence Studies, he held a number of senior air rank positions: on the Air Staff at the Ministry of Defence, in the MoD Procurement Executive, as Commandant of the Royal Air Force College Cranwell and, from 1994, as Air Officer Commanding No 38 Group RAF and Senior Air Staff Officer HQ Strike Command. He was appointed Air Member for Personnel on the Air Force Board and Air Officer Commanding-in-Chief Personnel and Training Command in May 1995 and served in that role until he retired in August 1998.

David Cousins has served as Honorary Air Commodore of No. 7630 (Volunteer Reserve) Intelligence Squadron, Royal Auxiliary Air Force for 10 years since August 2008: the unit provides support for intelligence analysis and briefings. He has also served as the Controller of the RAF Benevolent Fund from 1998 to 2006.

== Family ==
In 1966, he married Mary Holmes, daughter of Reverned A. W. S. Holmes. They have two sons and a daughter who all emigrated to New Zealand. He has seven grandchildren by his first marriage. He subsequently married Maggie Broadbent in 2006 who has three daughters and nine grandchildren.

Military offices
Preceded by R M Austin	Commandant of the Royal Air Force College Cranwell; 1992–1994	Succeeded by A J Stables
Preceded by J A G May	Air Officer Commanding No. 38 Group; 1994	Succeeded by David Hurrell
Preceded by Sir Andrew Wilson	Commander-in-Chief Personnel and Training Command; Air Member for Personnel; 1995–1998	Succeeded by Sir Anthony Bagnall
