= Philip Babington =

Royal Air Force Air Marshal (1894-1965)

Sir Philip Babington
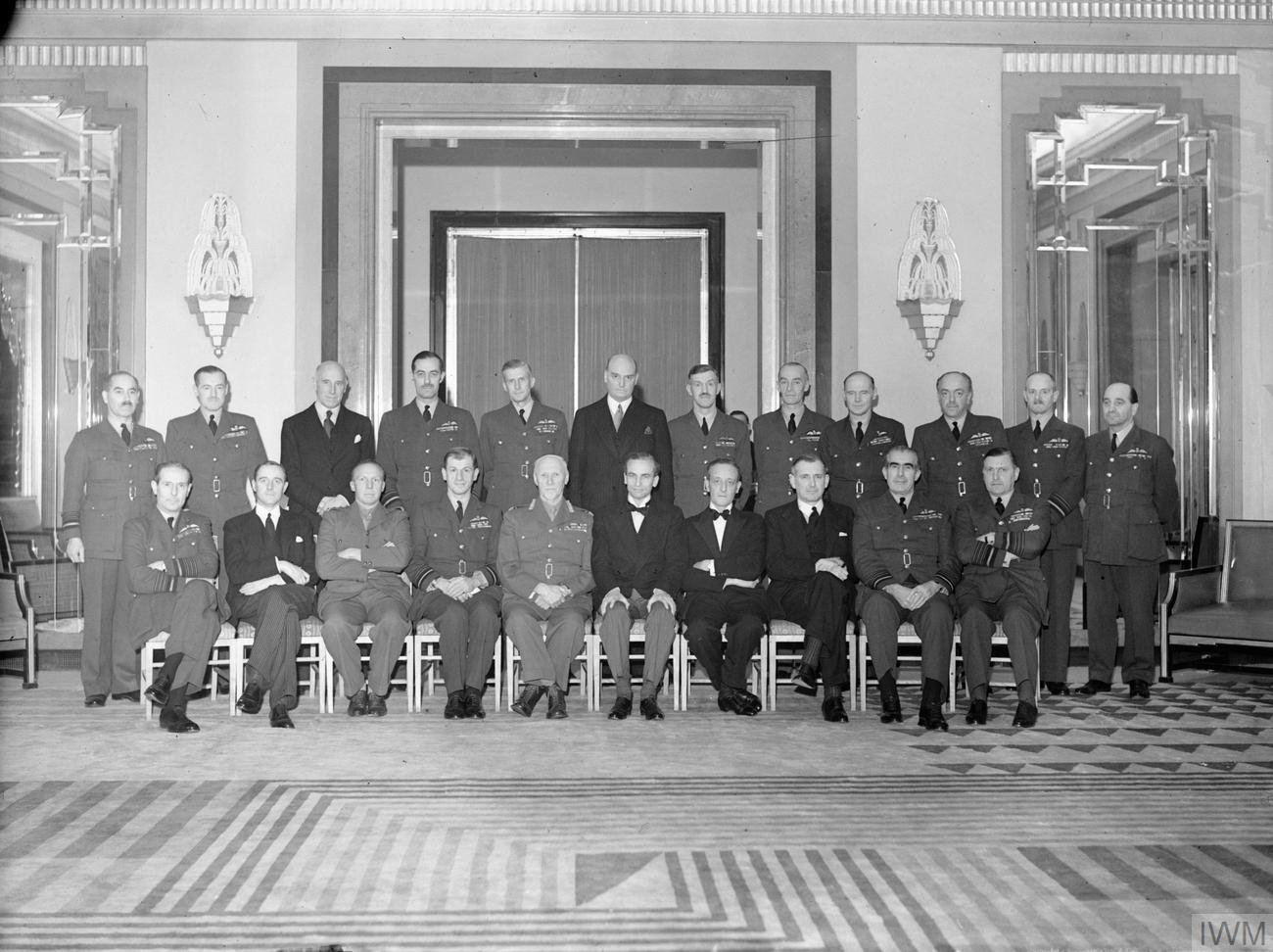
- Air Marshal Babington, standing seventh from left, as Air Officer Commanding-in-Chief, Flying Training Command, with the Air Council, Second World War
- Born: 25 February 1894; Marylebone, London, England
- Died: 25 February 1965 (aged 71); Tonbridge, Kent, England
- Military career
- Allegiance: United Kingdom
- Branch: British Army (1914–18); Royal Air Force (1918–45)
- Service years: 1914–45
- Rank: Air Marshal
- Commands: Flying Training Command (1942–45); Air Member for Personnel (1940–42); RAF Sealand (1925–28); No. 19 Squadron (1924–25); No. 56 Squadron (1920–21); No. 39 Squadron (1919); No. 37 Squadron (1919); 50th Wing (1918–19); No. 141 Squadron (1918); No. 46 Squadron (1916–17)
- Conflicts: First World War; Second World War
- Awards: Knight Commander of the Order of the Bath; Military Cross; Air Force Cross; Mentioned in Despatches (2); Commander's Cross with Star of the Order of Polonia Restituta (Poland)

Air Marshal Sir Philip Babington, KCB, MC, AFC (25 February 1894 – 25 February 1965) was a Royal Air Force officer who served as Air Officer Commanding-in-Chief of Flying Training Command from 1942 to 1945 during the Second World War. He was the younger brother of John Tremayne Babington.

== Education ==
His education was at Eton College.

== RAF career ==
Babington was commissioned into the Hampshire Regiment in 1914 at the start of the First World War and then transferred to the Royal Flying Corps. He was appointed Officer Commanding No. 46 Squadron on the Western Front in July 1916 until December 1917, he was also Station Commander RFC Suttons Farm in August 1917 when 46 Squadron were rotated from frontline operations to defend London from aerial attack. Babington went on to become Officer Commanding No. 141 Squadron at Biggin Hill in January 1918 before taking command of the 50th Wing later that year.

After the War he served as Officer Commanding No. 37 Squadron (later renumbered No. 39 Squadron), Officer Commanding No. 56 Squadron and Officer Commanding No. 19 Squadron. He was made Station Commander at RAF Sealand in 1925, Senior Personnel Staff Officer at Headquarters Inland Area in 1928 and Assistant Commandant at the Royal Air Force College Cranwell in 1931 before becoming Director of Postings at the Air Ministry in 1936.

He served in the Second World War as Air Member for Personnel from 1940 and as Air Officer Commanding-in-Chief of Flying Training Command from 1942 before retiring in 1944.

In retirement he joined a committee to consider the future of the court-martial system.

== External references ==
- Philip Babington on Lives of the First World War

Military offices
Preceded by Sir Leslie Gossage	Air Member for Personnel; 1940–1942	Succeeded by Sir Bertine Sutton
Preceded by Sir William Welsh	Air Officer Commanding-in-Chief Flying Training Command; 1942–1945	Succeeded by Sir Arthur Coningham
