= Sandy Wilson (RAF officer) =

Retired Royal Air Force air chief marshal (born 1941)

Sir Andrew Wilson
- Born: 27 February 1941 (age 85)
- Military career
- Allegiance: United Kingdom
- Branch: Royal Air Force
- Service years: 1962–95
- Rank: Air Chief Marshal
- Nickname: Sandy
- Commands: RAF Personnel and Training Command (1994–95); Air Member for Personnel (1993–95); RAF Germany (1991–93); British Forces Arabian Peninsula (1990); No. 1 Group (1989–91); RAF Lossiemouth (1980–82); No. II (AC) Squadron (1976–78)
- Conflicts: Gulf War
- Awards: Knight Commander of the Order of the Bath; Air Force Cross

Air Chief Marshal Sir Ronald Andrew Fellowes Wilson, KCB, AFC, FRAeS (born 27 February 1941), often known as Sir Andrew Wilson and sometimes known informally as Sir Sandy Wilson, is a retired senior Royal Air Force officer.

== RAF career ==
Educated at Tonbridge School, Wilson joined the Royal Air Force in 1962. From 1976 to 1978 Wilson served as the Commanding Officer of No. II (AC) Squadron. During this time the Squadron took delivery of the Jaguar which Wilson oversaw, flying practice reconnaissance missions. In 1980 Wilson was made Station Commander of RAF Lossiemouth.

In 1990 Wilson was appointed the Commander British Forces Middle East, making him the in-theatre commander for Operation Granby, the British contribution to the Gulf War. He was knighted in 1991 and in 1993 he was appointed Air Member for Personnel and the following year, on 1 April 1994, Wilson became the first Air Officer Commander-in-Chief of Personnel and Training Command.

== Retirement ==
He retired prematurely on 26 August 1995. He was accused of using £387,000 in government funds to refurbish Haymes Garth, the official residence for the Air Member for Personnel based at RAF Innsworth. He argued that funds had been approved for this purpose, but was not supported by the then Defence Minister, Sir Malcolm Rifkind.

Military offices
Preceded by D C Ferguson	Commanding Officer No. II (AC) Squadron; 1976–1978	Succeeded by R Fowler
Preceded by R Stuart-Paul	Station Commander RAF Lossiemouth; 1980–1982	Succeeded by P D Oulton
Preceded by John Thomson	Air Officer Commanding No 1 Group; 1989–1991	Succeeded by Richard Johns
New title Gulf War started	Commander British Forces Arabian Peninsula; In-theatre commander for Operation Granby; 11 August – 30 September 1990	Succeeded by Peter de la Billière; As Commander British Forces Middle East
New title Build up of allied forces	Air Commander British Forces Middle East; Also Deputy Commander British Forces Middle East; 1 October – 17 November 1990	Succeeded by Bill Wratten
Preceded by Sir Roger Palin	Commander-in-Chief RAF Germany; 1991–1993	RAF Germany disestablished
Preceded by Sir Roger Palin	Air Member for Personnel; 1993–1995	Succeeded by Sir David Cousins
New title Command Established	Commander-in-Chief Personnel and Training Command; 1994–1995	Succeeded by Sir David Cousins
