= John Day (RAF officer) =

Royal Air Force Air Chief Marshal (1947–2024)

Sir John Romney Day
- Born: 15 July 1947; Gillingham, Kent, England
- Died: 9 February 2024 (aged 76)
- Military career
- Allegiance: United Kingdom
- Branch: Royal Air Force
- Service years: c.1966–2003
- Rank: Air Chief Marshal
- Commands: Strike Command (2001–03); Personnel and Training Command (2000–01); No. 1 Group (1994–97); RAF Odiham (1987–89); No. 72 Squadron (1983–85); Oxford University Air Squadron (1976–79)
- Awards: Knight Commander of the Order of the Bath; Officer of the Order of the British Empire

Air Chief Marshal Sir John Romney Day, KCB, OBE, ADC (15 July 1947 – 9 February 2024) was a senior Royal Air Force commander and a military advisor to BAE Systems.

== Early life and education ==
John Day was born in Gillingham, Kent, England in 1947, however during the first nine years of his life, he spent a considerable amount of time in north east India where his father worked as a tea planter. He was educated at The King's School, Canterbury and at Imperial College London from where he graduated with a degree in aeronautical engineering. During his time at Imperial, Day received an RAF sponsorship and he was a member of the London University Air Squadron.

== RAF career ==
Following initial officer training and flying training, Day was posted to RAF Odiham flying the Wessex helicopter. He went on to command No. 72 Squadron, flying Wessex helicopters, in Northern Ireland in 1983, and returned to Odiham as Station Commander.

Day attended the Royal College of Defence Studies in 1990 and then took up the post of Director of Air Force Plans and Programmes at the Ministry of Defence. On promotion to air vice marshal in 1994, Day was appointed Air Officer Commanding No. 1 Group. In 1997 he was made Deputy Chief of the Defence Staff (Commitments) and Director of Operations for all the United Kingdom's operations (including the Kosovo campaign and operations over Iraq). In 2000, Day was appointed Air Member for Personnel and Commander-in-Chief Personnel and Training Command. In 2001, he was appointed Commander-in-Chief Strike Command.

Day retired from the Royal Air Force in 2003 and joined BAE Systems as their Senior Military Adviser.

== BAE controversy ==
Day became a senior military adviser to BAE Systems in 2003. The independent watchdog monitoring the movement of officials to companies recommended that he should wait a year before taking up his new BAE job, due to his history as head of RAF Strike Command. The committee warned that Day "had been involved with Air Force Board decisions which would have a direct bearing on the MoD's business with BAE". Controversially Tony Blair then personally overruled the watchdog, saying that it was "in the national interest" to let Day move to the firm.

== Chinook helicopter crash Board of Inquiry ==
In 1995, following the Chinook Helicopter Crash on the Mull of Kintyre, Day was the Reviewing Officer of the Board of Inquiry which had failed to find a cause of the accident. Despite a lack of Accident Data Recorder and Cockpit Voice Recorder, Day concluded that pilot error was the cause of the crash and found the pilots guilty of gross negligence. Following a subsequent Scottish Fatal Accident Inquiry and House of Commons Public Accounts Committee report, a House of Lords Select Committee was appointed to consider all the circumstances surrounding the crash and unanimously concluded "that the reviewing officers were not justified in finding that negligence on the part of the pilots caused the aircraft to crash".

== Death ==
Day died from brain cancer on 9 February 2024, at the age of 76.

Military offices
Unknown	Director of Air Force Plans and Programmes; 1991–1993	Succeeded by Jock Stirrup
Preceded by Peter Squire	Air Officer Commanding No 1 Group; 1993–1997	Succeeded by Jock Stirrup
Preceded by Sir Alexander Harley	Deputy Chief of the Defence Staff (Commitments); 1997–2000	Succeeded by Sir Anthony Pigott
Preceded by Sir Anthony Bagnall	Commander-in-Chief Personnel and Training Command; Air Member for Personnel; 2000–2001	Succeeded by Sir Christopher Coville
Preceded by Sir Anthony Bagnall	Commander-in-Chief RAF Strike Command; 2001–2003	Succeeded by Sir Brian Burridge
