= RAF Air and Space Command =

Headquarters of the Royal Air Force

Air and Space Command
- Air Command badge
- Founded: 1 April 2007
- Country: United Kingdom
- Branch: Royal Air Force
- Role: Military air operations
- Location: RAF High Wycombe, Buckinghamshire
- Motto: Fortis Ubique Volantis (Flying Bravely Everywhere)

Air and Space Command is the title applied to the Royal Air Force's Chief of the Air Staff's headquarters at RAF High Wycombe. As a military formation, it was formed by the merger of Royal Air Force Strike and Personnel and Training commands on 1 April 2007, and has its headquarters at RAF High Wycombe, Buckinghamshire. Since the last dedicated Commander-in-Chief stepped down in 2012 the central Whitehall MOD RAF staff and Air Command have run together to an increasing degree.

The equivalent in the Royal Navy is Navy Command Headquarters at Portsmouth and the equivalent in the British Army is Army Headquarters at Andover.

== History ==
Air Command was formed by the merger of RAF Strike Command and RAF Personnel and Training Command on 1 April 2007. Initially, it was under a four-star Air Chief Marshal, Commander-in-Chief, Air Command. At that time, there were two Deputy Commanders of Air Marshal rank: the Deputy Commander-in-Chief (Personnel) and the Deputy Commander-in-Chief (Operations). Initially it supervised No. 1 Group RAF and No. 2 Group RAF.

Following the implementation of the 2011 Levene Report, the role of Commander-in-Chief, Air Command was discontinued in spring 2012, and the deputy commanders started to report direct to the Chief of the Air Staff. Air Chief Marshal Sir Stephen Dalton was the first CAS to supervise the two deputy commanders-in-chief directly.

In November 2018, No. 11 Group was formed to create a "multi-domain operations group" as part of RAF Command.

In 2026, the command was renamed Air and Space Command to reflect the growing role of space in defence.

=== Commanders-in-Chief (post discontinued in Spring 2012) ===
- Air Chief Marshal Sir Clive Loader KCB OBE, 30 March 2007 – 2 April 2009 (appointed as C-in-C Strike Command)
- Air Chief Marshal Sir Christopher Moran KCB OBE MVO, 3 April 2009 – 26 May 2010 (Died in office)
- Air Chief Marshal Sir Simon Bryant KCB CBE, 18 June 2010 to March 2012

== CAS Subordinates ==
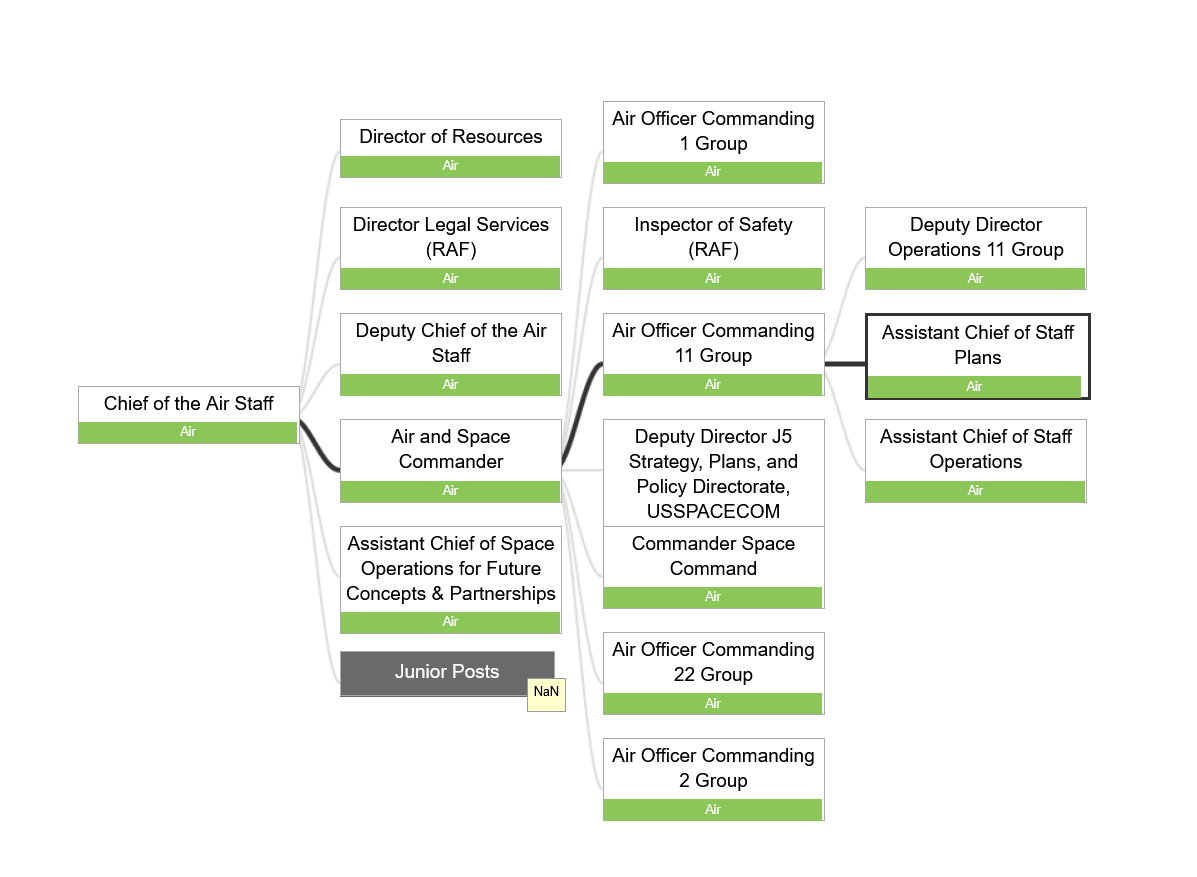
Seniormost uniformed staff and operational flying group headquarters of the Royal Air Force, as of 31 December 2025

As of 31 December 2025, the Chief of the Air Staff has five principal subordinates (see graph):

- James Fremantle, Director of Resources
- Air Vice-Marshal Mark Phelps, Director Legal Services (RAF)
- Deputy Chief of the Air Staff, responsible for personnel matters
- Air and Space Commander, responsible for air and space operations (including No. 1 Group, No. 2 Group, No. 11 Group, No. 22 Group RAF, and UK Space Command)
- Air Marshal Paul Godfrey, Assistant Chief of Space Operations for Future Concepts and Partnerships, attached United States Space Force, Washington, DC.

== See also ==
- List of Royal Air Force commands
- Structure of the Royal Air Force

Preceded by Strike Command	Air Command; 2007–	Succeeded by Command extant
Preceded by Personnel and Training Command	Air Command; 2007–	Succeeded by Command extant
