= RAF Personnel and Training Command =

Former command of the Royal Air Force

- RAF Personnel and Training Command badge
- Active: 1994 - 2007
- Disbanded: 1 April 2007
- Country: UK
- Branch: Royal Air Force
- Motto(s): Ut Aquilae Surgant (That Eagles Might Soar)

Personnel and Training Command (PTC) was one of two commands of the Royal Air Force (the other being Strike Command) that were merged to form Air Command on 1 April 2007.

== History ==
=== Formation ===
PTC was formed in 1994 bringing together the responsibilities of the former RAF Personnel Management Centre and the training functions of RAF Support Command. It therefore became responsible for recruiting people into the service, training all members of the RAF (including initial flying training), pay and allowances, and various careers functions including terms and conditions of service, welfare, and resettlement.

=== Merge with Strike Command into RAF Air Command ===
PTC was headquartered at RAF Innsworth near Gloucester from its inauguration until October 2006, when the headquarters co-located with Strike Command at RAF High Wycombe in Buckinghamshire in preparation for the merger to form RAF Air Command on 1 April 2007.

== Location ==
The Command's stations included Amport House, Andover, Hampshire; RAF Brampton/Wyton/Henlow, Huntingdon, Cambridgeshire; JSU Corsham, Wilts; RAF Cosford, Wolverhampton; the Royal Air Force College Cranwell, Sleaford, Lincolnshire; RAF Digby, Lincoln; RAF Halton, Aylesbury, Buckinghamshire; Headley Court, Epsom, Surrey; RAF Innsworth, Gloucester; RAF Linton-on-Ouse, York; RAF Scampton, Lincs; RAF Sealand, Deeside, Flintshire; RAF Shawbury, Shrewsbury; RAF St Athan, Barry, South Glamorgan; RAF Uxbridge, Middlesex; RAF Valley, Anglesey; and RAF Woodvale, Formby, Liverpool.

== Air Officers Commanding-in-Chief ==
Air Officers Commanding-in-Chief included:

- 1 April 1994 - Air Chief Marshal Sir Andrew Wilson
- 1 May 1995 - Air Marshal Sir David Cousins
- 7 August 1998 - Air Marshal Sir Anthony Bagnall
- 23 March 2000 - Air Marshal Sir John Day
- March 2001 - Air Marshal Sir Christopher Coville
- April 2003 - Air Marshal Sir Joe French
- 6 January 2006 - Air Marshal Barry Thornton

== See also ==
- List of Royal Air Force commands

Preceded by RAF Support Command	Personnel and Training Command; 1994–2007	Succeeded by Air Command
Preceded by Personnel Management Centre	Personnel and Training Command; 1994–2007	Succeeded by Air Command
