= Richard Johns =

Royal Air Force Air Chief Marshal (born 1939)

Air Chief Marshal Sir Richard Johns GCB KCVO CBE
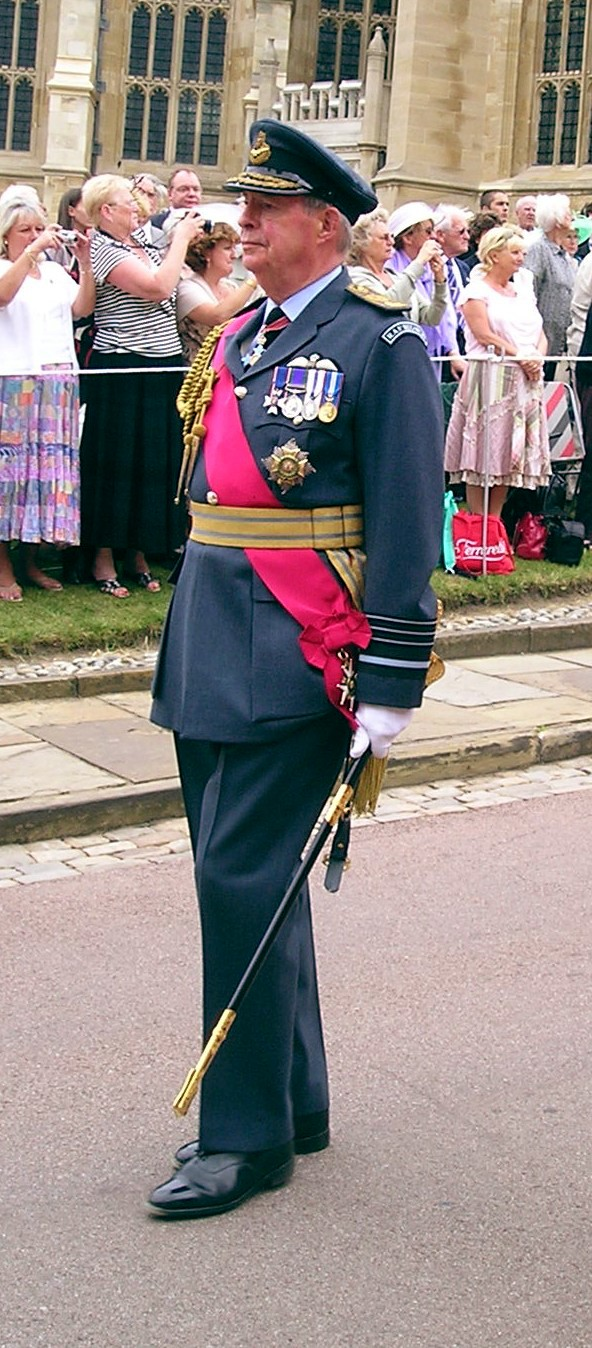
- Sir Richard Johns, the Constable and Governor of Windsor Castle, leading the procession to the Garter service in St George's Chapel at Windsor Castle
- Born: 28 July 1939 (age 87); Horsham, West Sussex, England
- Military career
- Allegiance: United Kingdom
- Branch: Royal Air Force
- Service years: 1959–2000
- Rank: Air Chief Marshal
- Commands: Chief of the Air Staff (1997–00); Allied Forces North West Europe (1994–97); Strike Command (1994); No. 1 Group (1991–93); RAF Gütersloh (1982–84); No. 3 (F) Squadron (1975–78)
- Conflicts: Gulf War
- Awards: Knight Grand Cross of the Order of the Bath; Knight Commander of the Royal Victorian Order; Commander of the Order of the British Empire
- Other work: Constable and Governor of Windsor Castle

Air Chief Marshal Sir Richard Edward Johns, GCB, KCVO, CBE (born 28 July 1939) is a retired senior Royal Air Force commander. He was a fighter pilot in the 1960s, commanding officer of a squadron during the 1970s and a station commander in the 1980s. Johns served as one of three British directors of operations on the senior planning staff for Operation Granby (the British contribution to the Gulf War) in 1991 and then acted as a supporting commander for joint operations in the Balkans in 1994. As Chief of the Air Staff he advised the British Government on the air force aspects of the Strategic Defence Review and on NATO's air campaign in Kosovo.

== RAF career ==
The son of Lieutenant Colonel Herbert Edward Johns and Marjory Harley Johns (née Everett), Johns was educated at Portsmouth Grammar School and RAF College Cranwell, and commissioned into the Royal Air Force on 15 December 1959. After completing flying training on Piston Provost and Gloster Meteor aircraft, Johns spent his early career as a fighter pilot flying Gloster Javelins serving in the UK, in Cyprus and in Aden. He was promoted to flying officer on 15 December 1960, flight lieutenant on 15 August 1962 and to squadron leader on 1 January 1969.

A Qualified Flying Instructor, in 1971 Johns trained Charles III (then the Prince of Wales) to wings standard on the Jet Provost. He was appointed a Lieutenant of the Royal Victorian Order in the 1972 New Year Honours. He attended Staff College in 1972 and then undertook a tour as Personal Staff Officer to the Air Officer Commanding-in-Chief Near East Air Force in Cyprus. Promoted to wing commander on 1 January 1974, he was appointed commanding officer of No. 3(F) Squadron flying Harriers from RAF Wildenrath and RAF Gütersloh in 1975.

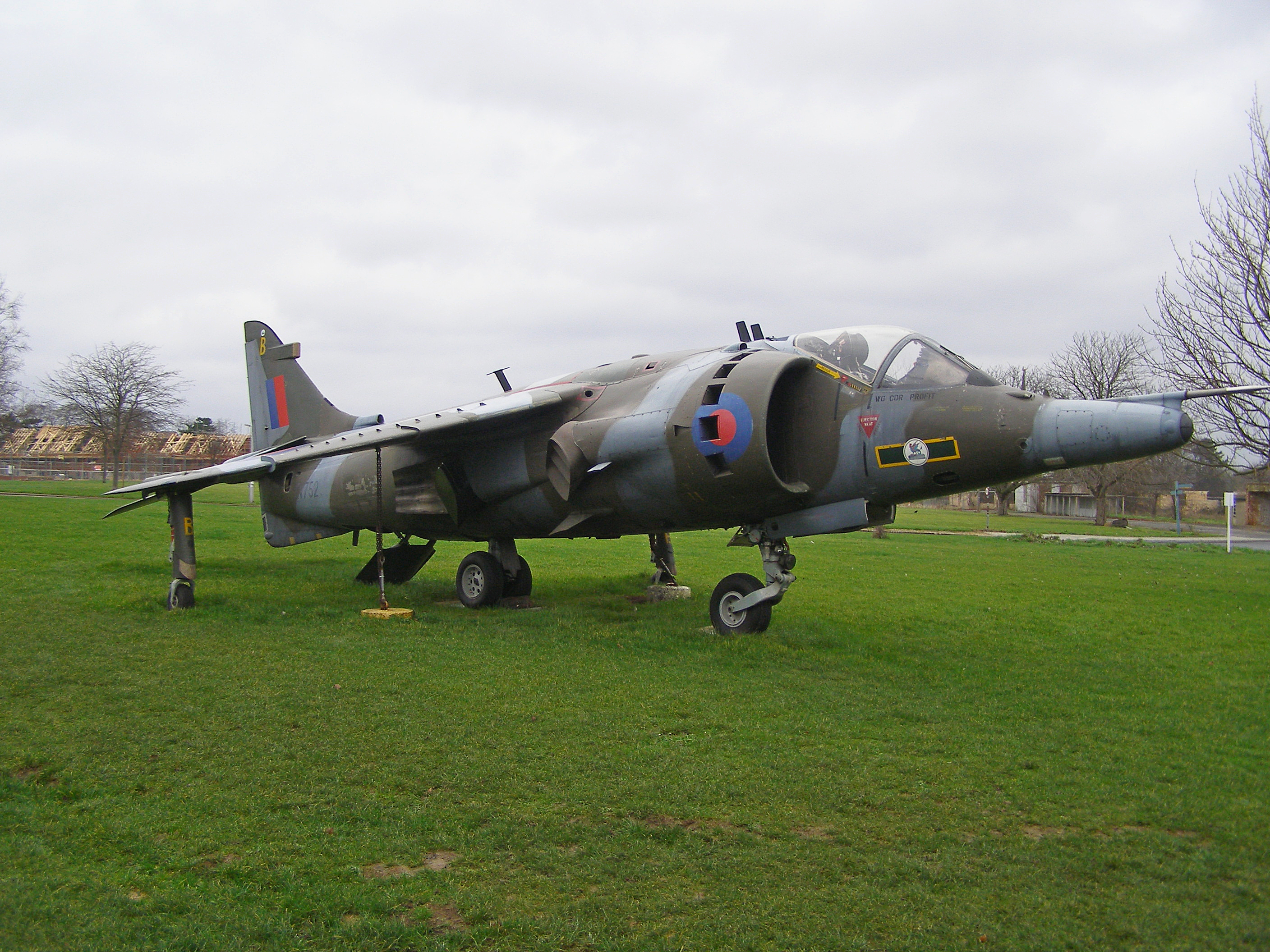
Harrier, a type flown by Johns in the 1970s

Johns was appointed an Officer of the Order of the British Empire in the 1978 New Year Honours. He was promoted to group captain on 1 July 1979 and became Director of Air Staff Briefing that year.

In 1982 Johns became Station Commander and Harrier Force Commander at RAF Gütersloh and was made Aide-de-Camp to the Queen on 10 December 1982. Promoted to air commodore on 1 January 1985, he was advanced to a Commander of the Order of the British Empire in the 1985 New Year Honours and attended the Royal College of Defence Studies later that year before becoming Senior Air Staff Officer at RAF Germany.

Promoted to air vice marshal on 1 January 1989, Johns went on to be Senior Air Staff Officer at RAF Strike Command in 1989 before he took up the appointment of Air Officer Commanding No 1 Group in 1991. He was appointed a Companion of the Order of the Bath in the 1991 Birthday Honours. It was also in 1991 that Johns served as one of three British directors of operations on the senior planning staff for Operation Granby (the British contribution to the Gulf War). Promoted to air marshal on 24 February 1993, Johns's next appointment was as Chief of Staff and Deputy Commander-in-Chief RAF Strike Command later that year. Advanced to Knight Commander of the Order of the Bath in 1994 New Year Honours and promoted to air chief marshal on 30 June 1994, Johns was appointed Commander-in-Chief Strike Command also on 30 June 1994. However, on 10 July 1994, Sir John Thomson who had just been appointed Commander-in-Chief of Allied Forces North West Europe died and Johns was transferred from Strike Command to the NATO command. In this role he acted as a supporting commander for joint operations in the Balkans. He became Honorary Colonel of 73 Engineer Regiment (Volunteers) on 29 November 1994.

Johns became Chief of the Air Staff (CAS) in 1997 and was advanced to Knight Grand Cross of the Order of the Bath in the 1997 Birthday Honours. He was also appointed Air Aide-de-Camp to The Queen on 9 April 1997. As CAS he advised the British Government on the air force aspects of the Strategic Defence Review and on NATO's air campaign during the Kosovo War, contending that air power had been highly accurate during the 11-week air campaign against the Serbs. He was succeeded by Sir Peter Squire as Chief of the Air Staff and Johns retired from the RAF in 2000.

== Later life ==
Johns became Constable and Governor of Windsor Castle in 2000: he was advanced to Knight Commander of the Royal Victorian Order on relinquishing that appointment on 17 December 2007. He also became honorary air commodore of the Royal Air Force Regiment on 22 April 2000. He was Chairman of the Trustees of the RAF Museum from 2000 to 2006 and has been President of Hearing Dogs for Deaf People since 2005.

== Personal life ==
In 1965, Johns married Elizabeth Naomi Anne Manning; they have one son and two daughters. His interests include military history, rugby, cricket and equitation.

== Honours and awards ==
Knight Grand Cross of the Most Honourable Order of the Bath (GCB)	1997
Knight Commander of the Most Honourable Order of the Bath (KCB)	1994
Companion of the Most Honourable Order of the Bath (CB)	1991
Knight Commander of the Royal Victorian Order (KCVO)	2007
Lieutenant of the Royal Victorian Order (LVO)	1972
Commander of the Most Excellent Order of the British Empire (CBE)	1985
Officer of the Most Excellent Order of the British Empire (OBE)	1978

Military offices
Preceded by Michael Stear	Station Commander RAF Gütersloh; 1982–1984	Succeeded by F W Mitchell
Preceded by Andrew Wilson	Air Officer Commanding No. 1 Group; 1991–1993	Succeeded by Peter Squire
Preceded by Sir John Kemball	Deputy Commander-in-Chief Strike Command; 1993–1994	Succeeded by Sir John Allison
Preceded by Sir John Thomson	Commander-in-Chief Strike Command; 1994	Succeeded by Sir William Wratten
Preceded by Sir John Thomson	Commander-in-Chief Allied Forces North West Europe; 1994–1997	Succeeded by Sir John Cheshire
Preceded by Sir Michael Graydon	Chief of the Air Staff; 1997–2000	Succeeded by Sir Peter Squire
Honorary titles
Preceded by Sir Patrick Palmer	Constable and Governor of Windsor Castle; 2000–2008	Succeeded by Ian Jenkins
New title	Honorary Air Commodore of the Royal Air Force Regiment; 2000–2013	Succeeded by Stephen Dalton
