= Kenneth Strong =

British Army general and civil servant (1900–1982)

Major-General Sir Kenneth Strong KBE CB
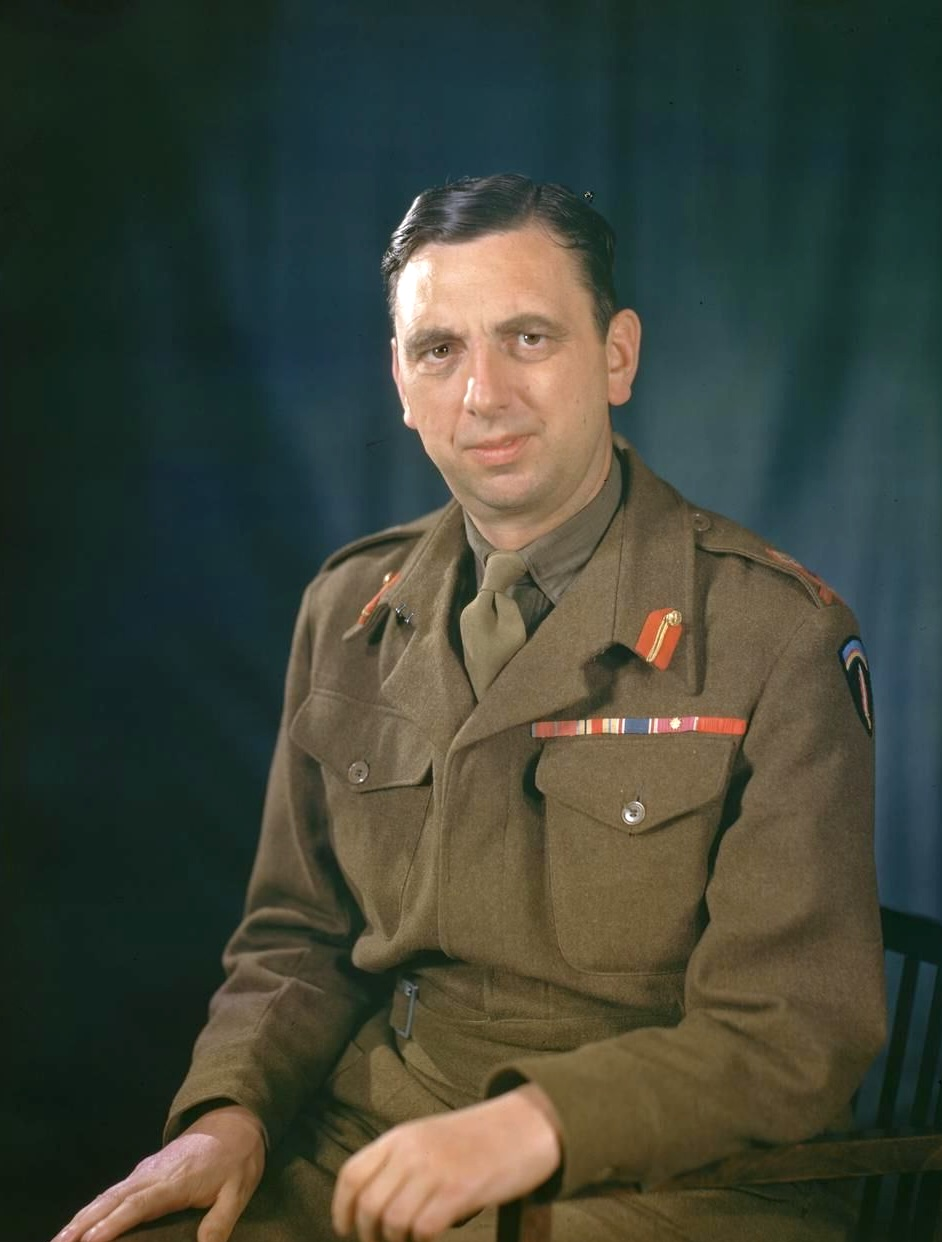
- Born: 9 September 1900; Montrose, Angus, Scotland
- Died: 11 January 1982 (aged 81); Eastbourne, East Sussex, England
- Military career
- Allegiance: United Kingdom
- Branch: British Army
- Service years: 1920–1947
- Rank: Major-General
- Service number: 6897
- Unit: Royal Scots Fusiliers
- Commands: Political Warfare Executive; 4th/5th Battalion Royal Scots Fusiliers
- Conflicts: Irish War of Independence; Occupation of the Rhineland; Second World War; Operation Torch; Tunisian campaign; Allied invasion of Sicily; Allied invasion of Italy; Operation Overlord; Siegfried Line Campaign; Battle of the Bulge; Western Allied invasion of Germany
- Awards: Knight Commander of the Order of the British Empire; Companion of the Order of the Bath; Mentioned in Despatches; Legion of Honour (France); Croix de guerre (France); Army Distinguished Service Medal (US); Legion of Merit (US); Order of the Red Banner (USSR)
- Other work: Director General of Intelligence, Ministry of Defence

Major-General Sir Kenneth William Dobson Strong, KBE, CB (9 September 1900 – 11 January 1982) was a senior officer of the British Army who served in the Second World War, rising to become Director General of Intelligence. A graduate of the Royal Military College, Sandhurst, Strong was commissioned into the 1st Battalion, Royal Scots Fusiliers in 1920. After service as an Intelligence Officer with his battalion in Ireland from 1920 to 1922 during the Irish War of Independence, he volunteered for service as an interpreter and was posted to Germany with the British Army of the Rhine. In 1935 he returned to Germany as a member of the International Force supervising the Saarland plebiscite. Afterwards, he joined the German Intelligence Section at the War Office. In 1937 he became Assistant Military attaché in Berlin.

Strong became Head of the German Section at MI14 in August 1939, shortly before the outbreak of the Second World War. He commanded the 4th/5th Battalion, Royal Scots Fusiliers in 1941, before becoming Brigadier General Staff (BGS) for Intelligence at Home Forces in 1942. In March 1943, Strong was appointed Assistant Chief of Staff for Intelligence (G-2) at General Dwight D. Eisenhower's Allied Force Headquarters (AFHQ). He attended the Italian peace negotiations. In May 1944 he joined Eisenhower's Supreme Headquarters Allied Expeditionary Force (SHAEF), and played a leading part in the negotiations for the unconditional surrender of Germany in 1945.

In August 1945, Strong became deputy director of the Political Warfare Executive, succeeding Sir Bruce Lockhart as its head a month later. He retired from the Army with the rank of major general in 1947 to become a civil servant. He was initially appointed director general of the Political Intelligence Department of the Foreign Office. He was the first director of the Joint Intelligence Bureau at the Ministry of Defence from 1948 until 1964, when he became the first director general of Intelligence at the Ministry of Defence. He retired from the civil service in 1966.

== Early life ==
Kenneth William Dobson Strong was born in Montrose, Angus, Scotland, on 9 September 1900, the only son amongst four children, to John Strong, the rector of Montrose Academy and his wife Ethel May née Dobson. He was educated at Montrose Academy, Glenalmond College and the Royal Military College, Sandhurst.

== Between the wars ==
Strong was commissioned into the 1st Battalion Royal Scots Fusiliers in 1920. He served as an intelligence officer with his battalion in Ireland from 1920 to 1922 during the Irish War of Independence. In 1922 he volunteered for service with the British Army of the Rhine. He was trained as an interpreter and posted to Germany from 1926 until the Occupation of the Rhineland ended in 1929. He then served as a Defence Security Officer in Malta and Gibraltar.

In 1935 he returned to Germany as a member of the International Force supervising the Saarland plebiscite. Afterwards, he joined the German Intelligence Section at the War Office. In 1937 he became assistant military attaché in Berlin to Noel Mason-Macfarlane. As such, Strong got to know many senior German military officers personally, including Wilhelm Keitel. Like Mason-Macfarlane, he became convinced that war with Germany was imminent and inevitable.

== Second World War ==
=== Allied Forces Headquarters ===
Strong was appointed Head of the German Section at MI14 in August 1939. He liaised with French intelligence until the Fall of France in June 1940. Thereafter, his section was concerned with the prospect of a German invasion. In April 1941, he assumed command of the 4th/5th Battalion Royal Scots Fusiliers, part of the 52nd (Lowland) Division. In March 1942, he became Brigadier General Staff (BGS) for Intelligence at GHQ Home Forces. For his services, Strong was appointed an Officer of the Order of the British Empire.

In March 1943, Strong was appointed Assistant Chief of Staff for Intelligence (G-2) at General Dwight Eisenhower's Allied Force Headquarters (AFHQ), replacing Brigadier Eric Mockler-Ferryman, whose over-reliance on Ultra sources had led to a misinterpretation of the enemy's intentions leading up to the disastrous Battle of the Kasserine Pass. Strong got on well with Eisenhower and his chief of staff, Major General Bedell Smith in particular, and Americans in general. Stephen Ambrose wrote,

Strong had an explosive laugh, an appreciation of the wisecrack, and an easy acceptance of the West Pointers' rough language and casual manner rare in British officers. In his memoirs he endeared himself to all those from the New World side of the Atlantic Ocean who had been put off by British stuffiness and snobbery when he remarked "The best time in a man's life is when he gets to like Americans."

In August 1943, Smith and Strong flew to Lisbon via Gibraltar in civilian clothes, where they met with Generale di Brigata Giuseppe Castellano at the British embassy. Castellano had hoped to arrange terms for Italy to join the United Nations, Smith was empowered to draw up an armistice between Italy and Allied armed forces, but was unable to negotiate political matters. Smith and Strong subsequently negotiated for the Allies with Castellano in Sicily over the terms over Italian surrender. On 3 September 1943, Smith and Castellano signed the agreed text on behalf of Eisenhower and Pietro Badoglio respectively at Cassibile, Sicily. For his work at AFHQ, Strong was promoted to major general on 11 January 1944, and awarded the Legion of Merit by the United States in March 1944.

=== Supreme Headquarters Allied Expeditionary Force ===
When Eisenhower was appointed Supreme Allied Commander in December 1943, he naturally wished to take key members of his AFHQ staff, including Strong, with him to his new assignment. On New Year's Eve, Smith met with Alan Brooke, now Chief of the Imperial General Staff, to discuss the transfer of key British staff from AFHQ to Supreme Headquarters Allied Expeditionary Force (SHAEF). Brooke made some concessions but refused to transfer Strong, who he believed could not be spared from the Mediterranean. A heated exchange resulted, with Smith demanding Brooke explain how Operation Overlord could be a success if the British Army withheld its best talent. Later Brooke complained to Eisenhower about Smith's behaviour. Accordingly, another AFHQ hand, Brigadier John Whiteley, became G-2 at SHAEF. However Eisenhower and Smith eventually had their way, going over Brooke's head to Prime Minister Winston Churchill, and Strong assumed the post on 25 May 1944, with Brigadier General Thomas J. Betts as his deputy.

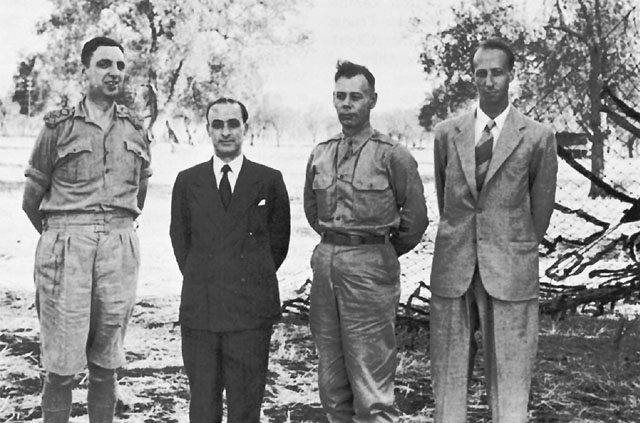
Secret Emissaries to Lisbon (left to right) Strong, Generale di Brigata Giuseppe Castellano, Major General Bedell Smith, and Consul Franco Montanari, an official from the Italian Foreign Office.

As it turned out, the relationship between SHAEF and Field Marshal Sir Bernard Montgomery's 21st Army Group was far from cordial, with the Deputy Supreme Commander, Air Chief Marshal Sir Arthur Tedder, and the Deputy Chief of Staff, Lieutenant General Frederick Morgan, both frequently critical of Montgomery. In September 1944 an intelligence crisis similar to Kasserine arose, when the cryptanalysts at Bletchley Park did not locate the 9th SS Panzer Division Hohenstaufen and 10th SS Panzer Division Frundsberg in the Arnhem area, but information from the Dutch resistance and a consequent photo reconnaissance ordered by Major Brian Urquhart, the intelligence officer at I Airborne Corps, confirmed the German presence. Strong and Smith then flew to Brussels to warn Montgomery. However, Montgomery decided to accept the risk rather than alter the plans for Operation Market Garden.

Heavy opposition from the two SS panzer divisions in the area proved to be a critical factor not only in preventing the British 1st Airborne Division from holding the Rhine Bridge at Arnhem, but also imposed serious delays on the capture of the bridges at Nijmegen by the U.S. 82nd Airborne Division and the advance of the armoured units of the British XXX Corps. For SHAEF, the outcome meant that attention had to turn to the Battle of the Scheldt to open the approaches to Antwerp and to building up resources for an invasion of Germany in 1945.

In December 1944, Strong identified a large German reserve. The Germans devised an elaborate deception plan, and because the troops were being assembled inside Germany, they relied on secure phone and teleprinter lines rather than radio. Ultra and signal intelligence therefore dried up. Ultra detected German hoarding of fuel, but this was misinterpreted as a response to a critical shortage rather than building up a reserve. However, the withdrawal of armoured units from the front line was duly noted, and by 20 November, using agents, aircraft and prisoner interrogations, SHAEF had located and enumerated the divisions of the Fifth Panzer Army east of Aachen and the Sixth Panzer Army east of the Roer River. Strong informed Smith that the German armoured reserves might be sent to the Eastern Front, or used for a counterattack against an Allied penetration of the front, but might also be used for a counterattack during a period of bad weather. In early December, SHAEF detected tank movements in the Bitburg area, and Strong became worried about a possible counterattack against the Allied lines in the Ardennes or the Vosges. Smith sent Strong to warn Lieutenant General Omar Bradley, the commander of the 12th Army Group, of the danger. Bradley's response was succinct: "Let them come."

The magnitude and ferocity of the German Ardennes Offensive came as a shock and Strong was criticised for failing to predict it. However Smith defended Strong against criticism for failing to sound the alarm, feeling that Strong had given ample warning, which had been discounted or disregarded by himself and others. By 19 December, Strong had become concerned that the Germans were going to split Bradley's armies, and he and Whiteley – who had already received Monty's opinion on the matter – went to Smith, recommending that the armies north of the Ardennes be transferred from Bradley to Montgomery's command. Smith realised the military and political implications of this, and knew that such a recommendation had to come from an American officer. On 20 December, Smith spoke to Eisenhower, who deferred judgement until the morning staff meeting. Eisenhower then phoned Bradley and Montgomery and ordered it. The decision was greatly resented by many Americans, particularly at 12th Army Group.

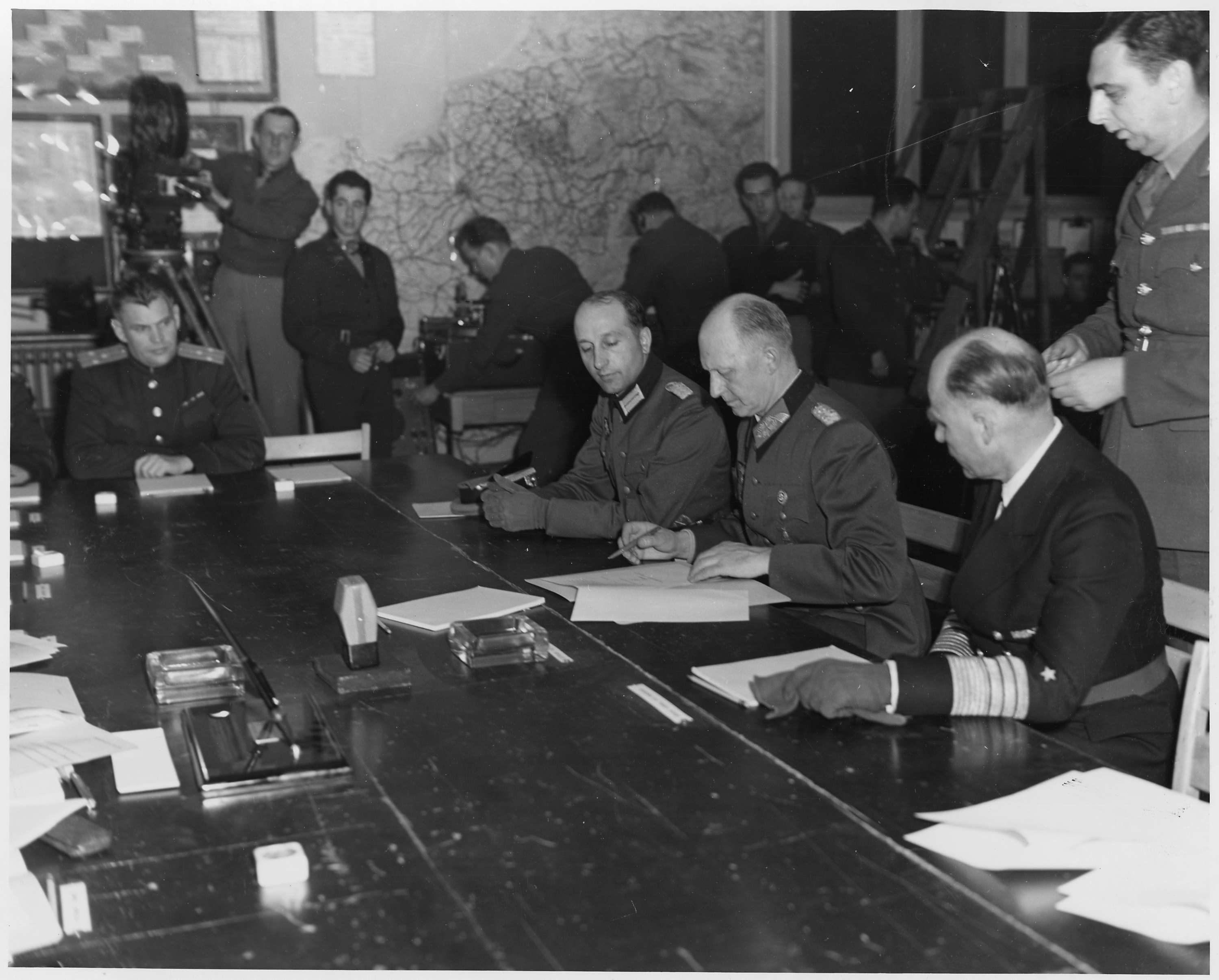
Strong (right) looks on as Generaloberst Alfred Jodl and Generaladmiral Hans-Georg von Friedeburg sign the instrument of German surrender.

On 15 April 1945, Nazi governor ('Reichskommissar') of the Netherlands, Arthur Seyss-Inquart, offered to open Amsterdam to food and coal shipments to ease the suffering of the civilian population. Smith and Strong, representing SHAEF, along with Major General Ivan Susloparov, representing the USSR, Prince Bernhard of Lippe-Biesterfeld, representing the Dutch government, and Major General Sir Francis de Guingand, from 21st Army Group, met with Seyss-Inquart in the Dutch village of Achterveld on 30 April. They successfully negotiated for the provision of food to the starving Dutch civilian population in the cities in the west of the country, and opened discussions for the peaceful and complete German capitulation in the Netherlands that would follow on 5 May.

Another set of negotiations, that of the surrender of German armed forces, were conducted in May 1945. Smith and Strong met with the representatives of the Oberkommando der Wehrmacht, Generaloberst Alfred Jodl and Generaladmiral Hans-Georg von Friedeburg. Once again, Strong acted as translator. Strong was present when, on 7 May, Smith signed the surrender document, along with Suslaparov and the French representative, Major General François Sevez.

For his services at SHAEF, Strong was mentioned in despatches, appointed a Companion of the Order of the Bath, and awarded the United States Distinguished Service Medal, and other foreign awards, including the French Croix de Guerre and Légion d'honneur, and the Order of the Red Banner from the USSR.

== Post war ==
In August 1945, Strong became deputy director of the Political Warfare Executive, succeeding Sir Bruce Lockhart as its head a month later. With the elevation of Montgomery to Chief of the Imperial General Staff in 1946, the career prospects of officers who had served at SHAEF, like Morgan, Gale, Whiteley and Strong, became dim, and Strong retired from the Army with the rank of major general on 9 May 1947 to become a civil servant.

He was initially appointed Director General of the Political Intelligence Department of the Foreign Office. He was the first Director of the Joint Intelligence Bureau at the Ministry of Defence from 1948 until 1964, when he became the first Director General of Intelligence at the Ministry of Defence. He was knighted on 1 January 1952, and became a Knight Commander of the Order of the British Empire in 1966. He retired on 9 May 1966.

Strong became a director of Eagle Star Insurance and other companies. He wrote two books, his memoir, Intelligence at the Top (1970), and Men of Intelligence (1970). Unfortunately, both were written before the Ultra secret was revealed in 1974. In 1979 he married a widow, Brita Charlota Horridge. Their marriage produced no children. Strong died at his home in Eastbourne, East Sussex on 11 January 1982. His papers are in the Liddell Hart Centre for Military Archives.

== Publications ==
- Strong, Kenneth (1969). Intelligence at the Top: the Recollections of an Intelligence Officer. Garden City, New York: Doubleday. OCLC 1260.
- Strong, Kenneth (1970). Men of Intelligence: a Study of the Roles and Decisions of Chiefs of Intelligence from World War I to the Present Day. Littlehampton Book Services. ISBN 978-0-304-93652-6.

== Notes ==
Government offices
New post	Director-General Intelligence; 1964−1966	Succeeded by Sir Alfred Earle
