= No. 232 Group RAF =

Former Royal Air Force operations group

No. 232 (Transport) Group RAF
- Royal Air Force Ensign
- Active: 24 February 1945 - 15 August 1946
- Country: United Kingdom
- Branch: Royal Air Force
- Type: Royal Air Force group
- Part of: RAF Transport Command
- Engagements: Second World War

No. 232 (Transport) Group RAF (232 Gp) was a group of the Royal Air Force, active between 1945 and 1946.

== History ==
No. 232 Group was formed 24 February 1945, in Comilla, from the RAF element of the Combat Cargo Task Force, and appears to have included No. 436 Squadron RCAF. Leaving a detachment at Comilla the group headquarters relocated to Rangoon during October. In March 1946 it moved to Singapore, where it disbanded on 15 August 1946. It was officially a Transport Command Group, operating under control of HQ Air Command South-East Asia. Air Commodore Alfred Earle was Air Officer Commanding, having arrived from command of No. 300 Group RAF in Australia.

It had a communication squadron, No. 232 Group Communication Squadron.

== See also ==
- List of Royal Air Force Communication units
