= Ian Hogg =

Ian Hogg may refer to:

- Ian Hogg (actor) (born 1937), English actor
- Ian Hogg (Royal Navy officer) (1911–2003)
- Ian V. Hogg (1926–2002), Royal Artillery officer and author
- Ian Hogg (footballer) (born 1989), New Zealand footballer
