= MI-14 =

MI-14 can refer to:

- Mil Mi-14, Soviet helicopter
- Michigan's 14th congressional district
- M-14 (Michigan highway)
- MI14, British Military Intelligence Section 14
