= Vice-Chief of the Defence Staff (United Kingdom) =

Deputy professional head of the United Kingdom's military

- Car flag of the Vice-Chief of the Defence Staff

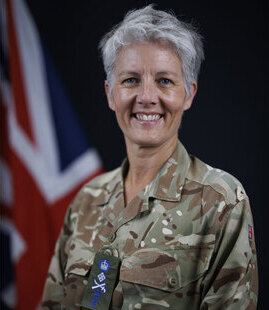
- Incumbent; General Dame Sharon Nesmith since June 2024
- Ministry of Defence
- Abbreviation: VCDS
- Member of: Defence Council; Chiefs of Staff Committee
- Reports to: Chief of the Defence Staff
- Nominator: Secretary of State for Defence
- Appointer: Prime Minister; Subject to formal approval by the King-in-Council
- Precursor: Deputy Chief of the Defence Staff
- Formation: February 1964
- First holder: Air Chief Marshal Sir Alfred Earle
- Website: Official website

Vice-Chief of the Defence Staff (VCDS) is the title of the deputy to the Chief of the Defence Staff, the professional head of the British Armed Forces. It is the second-most senior position within the British Armed Forces. The position was titled Deputy Chief of the Defence Staff before 1964.

== Responsibilities ==
The Vice Chief of the Defence Staff deputises for the Chief of the Defence Staff and has responsibility for running the armed forces aspects of defence business, principally through the central staff. VCDS is responsible for:

- Deputising for CDS (in particular as Military Strategic Commander)
- Co-ordinating delivery of top-level decisions-making, implementation and monitoring progress
- Leading senior military judgement for the future development of the armed forces including the definition and delivery for military capability requirements; and being capability sponsor for capital projects and programmes
- Defence Board lead for military personnel and training (including Reserves)
- Leading the preparation of the armed forces input to SDSRs
- (with CDS) conduct of the military strategic dialogue

== List of Vice Chiefs of the Defence Staff ==
These are:

No.	Picture	Vice-Chief of the Defence Staff	Took office	Left office	Defence branch
1	Sir Alfred Earle GBE, CB	Air Chief Marshal; Sir Alfred Earle GBE, CB (1907–1990)	February 1964	May 1966	Royal Air Force
2	Sir George Cole KCB, CBE	Lieutenant General; Sir George Cole KCB, CBE (1911–1973)	May 1966	November 1967	British Army
3	Sir Ian Hogg KCB, DSC & Bar	Vice Admiral; Sir Ian Hogg KCB, DSC & Bar (1911–2003)	November 1967	March 1970	Royal Navy
4	Sir John Barraclough KCB, CBE, DFC, AFC	Air Marshal; Sir John Barraclough KCB, CBE, DFC, AFC (1918–2008)	March 1970	February 1972	Royal Air Force
5	Sir John Gibbon GCB, OBE	Lieutenant General; Sir John Gibbon GCB, OBE (1917–1997)	February 1972	January 1974	British Army
6	Sir Peter Le Cheminant KCB, DFC & Bar	Air Marshal; Sir Peter Le Cheminant KCB, DFC & Bar (1920–2018)	January 1974	January 1976	Royal Air Force
7	Sir Henry Leach KCB	Vice Admiral; Sir Henry Leach KCB (1923–2011)	January 1976	March 1977	Royal Navy
8	Sir Anthony Morton KCB	Vice Admiral; Sir Anthony Morton KCB (1923–2006)	March 1977	April 1978	Royal Navy
9	Sir Edwin Bramall KCB, OBE, MC	General; Sir Edwin Bramall KCB, OBE, MC (1923–2019)	April 1978	May 1979	British Army
10	Sir Patrick Howard-Dobson GCB	General; Sir Patrick Howard-Dobson GCB (1921–2009)	May 1979	June 1981	British Army
11	Sir David Evans GCB, CBE	Air Chief Marshal; Sir David Evans GCB, CBE (1924–2020)	June 1981	June 1983	Royal Air Force
12	Sir Peter Herbert KCB, OBE	Admiral; Sir Peter Herbert KCB, OBE (1929–2019)	June 1983	January 1985	Royal Navy
13	Sir Peter Harding KCB	Air Chief Marshal; Sir Peter Harding KCB (1933–2021)	January 1985	August 1985	Royal Air Force
14	Sir Patrick Hine KCB	Air Chief Marshal; Sir Patrick Hine KCB (born 1932)	August 1985	October 1987	Royal Air Force
15	Sir Richard Vincent KCB, DSO	General; Sir Richard Vincent KCB, DSO (1931–2018)	October 1987	March 1991	British Army
16	Sir Benjamin Bathurst GCB	Admiral; Sir Benjamin Bathurst GCB (1936–2025)	March 1991	January 1993	Royal Navy
17	Sir John Slater GCB, LVO	Admiral; Sir John Slater GCB, LVO (born 1938)	January 1993	April 1995	Royal Navy
18	Sir John Willis GBE, KCB	Air Chief Marshal; Sir John Willis GBE, KCB (1937–2008)	April 1995	October 1997	Royal Air Force
19	Sir Peter Abbott GBE, KCB	Admiral; Sir Peter Abbott GBE, KCB (1942–2015)	October 1997	May 2001	Royal Navy
20	Sir Anthony Bagnall GBE, KCB	Air Chief Marshal; Sir Anthony Bagnall GBE, KCB (born 1945)	May 2001	July 2005	Royal Air Force
21	Sir Timothy Granville-Chapman GBE, KCB	General; Sir Timothy Granville-Chapman GBE, KCB (born 1947)	July 2005	May 2009	British Army
22	Sir Nicholas Houghton GCB, CBE	General; Sir Nicholas Houghton GCB, CBE (born 1954)	May 2009	May 2013	British Army
23	Sir Stuart Peach GBE, KCB	Air Chief Marshal; Sir Stuart Peach GBE, KCB (born 1956)	May 2013	May 2016	Royal Air Force
24	Sir Gordon Messenger KCB, DSO & Bar, OBE	General; Sir Gordon Messenger KCB, DSO & Bar, OBE (born 1962)	May 2016	May 2019	Royal Marines
25	Sir Timothy Fraser KCB	Admiral; Sir Timothy Fraser KCB	May 2019	September 2022	Royal Navy
26	Gwyn Jenkins CB, OBE	General; Gwyn Jenkins CB, OBE	August 2022	June 2024	Royal Marines
27	Dame Sharon Nesmith DCB, ADC	General; Dame Sharon Nesmith DCB, ADC	June 2024		British Army
