= Alfred Earle =

Royal Air Force Air Chief Marshal (1907–1990)

Air Chief Marshal Sir Alfred Earle GBE CB
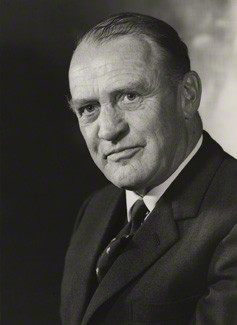
- Born: 11 December 1907
- Died: 27 March 1990 (aged 82)
- Education: Shebbear College
- Military career
- Allegiance: United Kingdom
- Branch: Royal Air Force
- Service years: 1925–1966
- Rank: Air Chief Marshal
- Commands: Vice-Chief of the Defence Staff (1964–66); Technical Training Command (1962–64); No. 13 Group (1957–59); No. 232 Group (1946); No. 300 (Transport) Group (1945); RAF West Wickham (1943); No. 428 Squadron RCAF (1942–43)
- Conflicts: Second World War
- Awards: Knight Grand Cross of the Order of the British Empire; Companion of the Order of the Bath
- Other work: Director-General Intelligence (1966–68)

Air Chief Marshal Sir Alfred Earle, GBE, CB (11 December 1907 – 27 March 1990) was a senior officer in the Royal Air Force during the Second World War who later served as Vice-Chief of the Defence Staff (1964–66), and Director General of British Defence Intelligence (1966–1968).

== Military career ==
After studying at Shebbear College, Earle was commissioned into the Royal Air Force in 1925. He served in bomber squadrons in the United Kingdom and in Iraq and then became an instructor at the RAF School of Photography from 1930.

He served in the Second World War and commanded the new School of Photography in Blackpool before joining the Directorate of Photography at the Air Ministry in 1940. He transferred to the Directorate of Plans in 1941 and then formed and commanded No. 428 Squadron RCAF in 1942. He was made commander of RAF Ridgewell and RAF West Wickham in 1943 before joining the staff of General Sir Hastings Ismay for the Cairo Conference and then the Yalta Conference. In 1945 he was made Air Officer Commanding No. 300 (Transport) Group in Australia.

After the war he became Air Officer Commanding No. 232 Group in South East Asia before joining the Directing Staff at the RAF Staff College, Bracknell in 1946. He was made Senior Personnel Staff Officer at Headquarters Technical Training Command in 1949 and then Commandant of the Royal Australian Air Force Staff College in 1951.

He became Director of Policy (Air Staff) in 1954 and Air Chief of Staff (Policy) in 1955. He was Air Officer Commanding No. 13 Group from 1957 and Deputy Chief of the Defence Staff from 1960. He was made Air Officer Commanding-in-Chief at Technical Training Command in 1962 and Vice-Chief of the Defence Staff in 1964.

In 1966 Sir Alfred became the second chief of Defence Intelligence, then known as Director-General Intelligence, succeeding Sir Kenneth Strong.

== Retirement ==
Earle retired from the RAF in 1966, before taking up the position of Director-General of Intelligence at the Ministry of Defence. From 1974 to 1976 he was the chairman of Waveney District Council.

Military offices
Post established	Vice-Chief of the Defence Staff; 1964–1966	Succeeded by Sir George Cole
Preceded by Sir Wallace Kyle	Air Officer Commanding-in-Chief Technical Training Command; 1962–1964	Succeeded by Sir Donald Evans
Preceded by Walter Cheshire	Air Officer Commanding No. 13 Group; 1957–1959	Succeeded by Harold Maguire
Preceded by	Air Officer Commanding No. 232 Group; 1946	Succeeded by
Government offices
Preceded by Sir Kenneth Strong	Director-General Intelligence; 1966–1968	Succeeded by Sir Harold Maguire
