= George Cole (British Army officer) =

British Army officer (1911–1973)

Lieutenant-General Sir George Cole KCB CBE
- Born: 12 March 1911; Croydon, Surrey, England
- Died: 1973 (aged 61–62); Uckfield, Sussex, England
- Military career
- Allegiance: United Kingdom
- Branch: British Army
- Service years: 1931–1967
- Rank: Lieutenant-General
- Service number: 52577
- Unit: Royal Artillery
- Commands: Vice-Chief of the Defence Staff; Eastern Command; 40th Field Regiment, Royal Artillery; 58th Light Anti Aircraft Regiment, Royal Artillery
- Conflicts: Second World War
- Awards: Knight Commander of the Order of the Bath; Commander of the Order of the British Empire

Lieutenant-General Sir George Sinclair Cole, KCB, CBE (12 March 1911 – 2 March 1973) was a senior British Army officer who achieved high office in the 1960s.

== Early life and education ==
Cole was born in Croydon, Surrey, the son of Captain Audry Valentine Cole (born Witkowsky) and Dorothea Mary Sinclair Carolin. His grandfather, Leopold Witkowsky (later Cole), a civil servant of the Indian Civil Service, was born in Chicago to Polish parents. He was educated at Wellington College and the Royal Military Academy, Woolwich.

== Military career ==
George Cole was commissioned into the Royal Artillery on 27 August 1931.

Cole served in the Second World War as a member of the British Expeditionary Force deployed to France in 1939 and then as a general staff officer in military operations at the War Office from 1943. He became commanding officer of 58th Light Anti Aircraft Regiment, Royal Artillery within 21st Army Group in 1945.

After the war he was appointed military assistant to the Chief of the Imperial General Staff in 1946 and military assistant to the chairman of Western Europe Commanders-in-Chief in 1949. He went to the Joint Services Staff College in 1950, after which he became deputy chief of staff, Allied Land Forces, Central Europe in 1950. He was then made head of the Exercise Planning Staff at Supreme Headquarters Allied Powers Europe in 1951.

He went to the Imperial Defence College in 1953 and then became commanding officer of 40th Field Regiment, Royal Artillery in Egypt and Cyprus from 1954 to 1955. He was commander Royal Artillery for 1st Infantry Division from 1956 to 1959 when he became secretary of the Chiefs of Staff Committee. He was appointed director of staff duties at the War Office in 1961 and general officer commanding-in-chief for Eastern Command in 1965. He went on to be vice-chief of the Defence Staff in 1966: he retired in 1967.

He was a keen golfer. After his death, Lt.-Gen. Sir John Cowley, his housemate at Wellington, wrote to The Times:

Since his early years George was a perfectionist. He was satisfied with nothing but the highest standard both at work and at games, and he was inclined to be intolerant of those who failed to reach this standard. To those who knew him well he was a delightful friend, intelligent, generous and very entertaining. As subalterns we played against each other in the annual dog fights between sappers and gunners at hockey, squash and golf. He always beat me, except sometimes at hockey where other people were involved. In later life he became an extremely good golfer, one of the best in the country for his age. For many years he was the backbone of the Wellington golf team in the Halford Hewitt. In the 1972 meeting he holed out the first nine holes of the Red Course at the Berkshire in 31 strokes, at the age of 61.

— Lt.-Gen. Sir John Cowley, The Times, 5 March 1973

Military offices
Preceded by Sir Roderick McLeod	GOC-in-C Eastern Command; 1965–1966	Succeeded by Sir David Yates
Preceded by Sir Alfred Earle	Vice-Chief of the Defence Staff; 1966–1967	Succeeded by Sir Ian Hogg
