= Peter Le Cheminant =

British Royal Air Force officer (1920–2018)

Air Chief Marshal Sir Peter Le Cheminant GBE KCB DFC & Bar
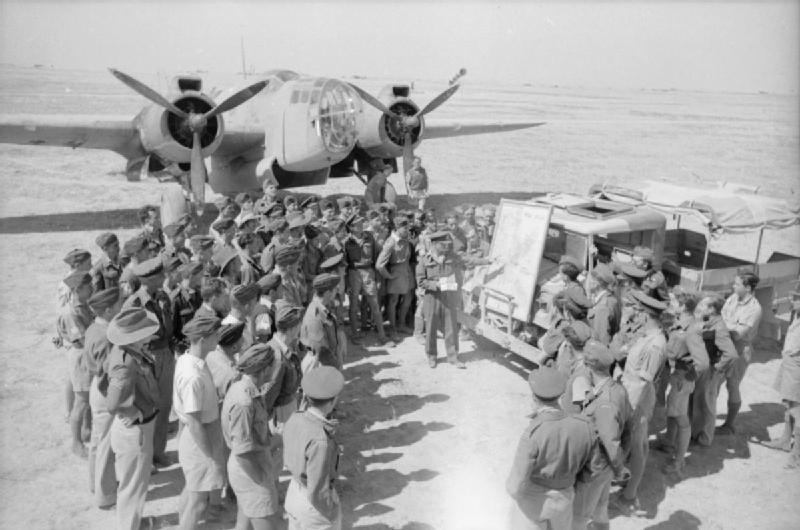
- Wing Commander Le Cheminant briefs aircrews for a bombing raid on La Fauconnerie South, Tunisia (scene reconstructed after the event).
- Born: 17 June 1920
- Died: 8 April 2018 (aged 97)
- Military career
- Allegiance: United Kingdom
- Branch: Royal Air Force
- Service years: 1939–1979
- Rank: Air Chief Marshal
- Commands: Vice-Chief of the Defence Staff (1974–76); Joint Warfare Establishment (1968–71); RAF Geilenkirchen (1961–63); No. 223 Squadron (1949–51); No. 223 Squadron (1943–44)
- Conflicts: Second World War; Korean War; Indonesia–Malaysia confrontation
- Awards: Knight Grand Cross of the Order of the British Empire; Knight Commander of the Order of the Bath; Distinguished Flying Cross & Bar

Air Chief Marshal Sir Peter de Lacy Le Cheminant, GBE, KCB, DFC & Bar (17 June 1920 – 8 April 2018) was a senior commander of the Royal Air Force (RAF), who served as Vice-Chief of the Defence Staff from 1974 to 1976 and Deputy Commander-in-Chief of Allied Forces Central Europe from 1976 until his retirement in 1979.

== Military career ==
Educated at Elizabeth College (Guernsey) and the Royal Air Force College Cranwell, Le Cheminant was commissioned into the Royal Air Force (RAF) as a pilot officer (on probation) on 23 December 1939, shortly after the outbreak of the Second World War. He was confirmed in his rank and promoted to flying officer (war-substantive) on 23 December 1940. He was promoted to flight lieutenant (war-substantive) on 23 December 1941 and to the substantive rank of flight lieutenant on 23 June 1943. An acting squadron leader by 1943, he was promoted to squadron leader (war-substantive) on 4 August 1943.

Also in 1943, Le Cheminant was awarded the Distinguished Flying Cross (DFC). He was promoted to the permanent rank of squadron leader on 1 August 1947. He also served in the Korean War and was awarded a Bar to his DFC in 1951. He was promoted to wing commander on 1 July 1951 and to group captain on 1 July 1958.

Promoted to air commodore on 1 January 1964, Le Cheminant was appointed Senior Air Staff Officer, Far East Air Force on 16 May 1966 with the acting rank of air vice marshal. He was promoted to the permanent rank of air vice marshal on 1 January 1967, and became Commandant of the Joint Warfare Establishment at Old Sarum on 20 November and Assistant Chief of the Air Staff (Policy) on 1 May 1971. Promoted air marshal on 4 July 1972, he then became Vice-Chief of the Defence Staff in 1974. He was promoted to air chief marshal on 2 February 1976 and appointed Deputy Commander-in-Chief of Allied Forces Central Europe on 5 February. He relinquished the command on 1 June 1979 and retired from the RAF on 27 August.

Le Cheminant was appointed a Companion of the Order of the Bath in the 1968 Birthday Honours, and knighted as a Knight Commander of the Order of the Bath in the 1972 Birthday Honours. He was appointed a Knight Grand Cross of the Order of the British Empire in the 1978 Birthday Honours.

== Later career ==
Le Cheminant served as Lieutenant Governor of Guernsey from 1980 to 1985. He was the only native Guernseyman to have held that post. After his retirement he remained a keen Bisley marksman. Le Cheminant died on 8 April 2018.

Military offices
Preceded by Sir John Gibbon	Vice-Chief of the Defence Staff; 1973–1975	Succeeded by Sir Henry Leach
Preceded by Sir Lewis Hodges	Deputy Commander-in-Chief Allied Forces Central Europe; 1976–1979	Succeeded by Sir John Stacey
Government offices
Preceded by Sir John Martin	Lieutenant Governor of Guernsey; 1980–1985	Succeeded by Sir Alexander Boswell
