= No. 238 Squadron RAF =

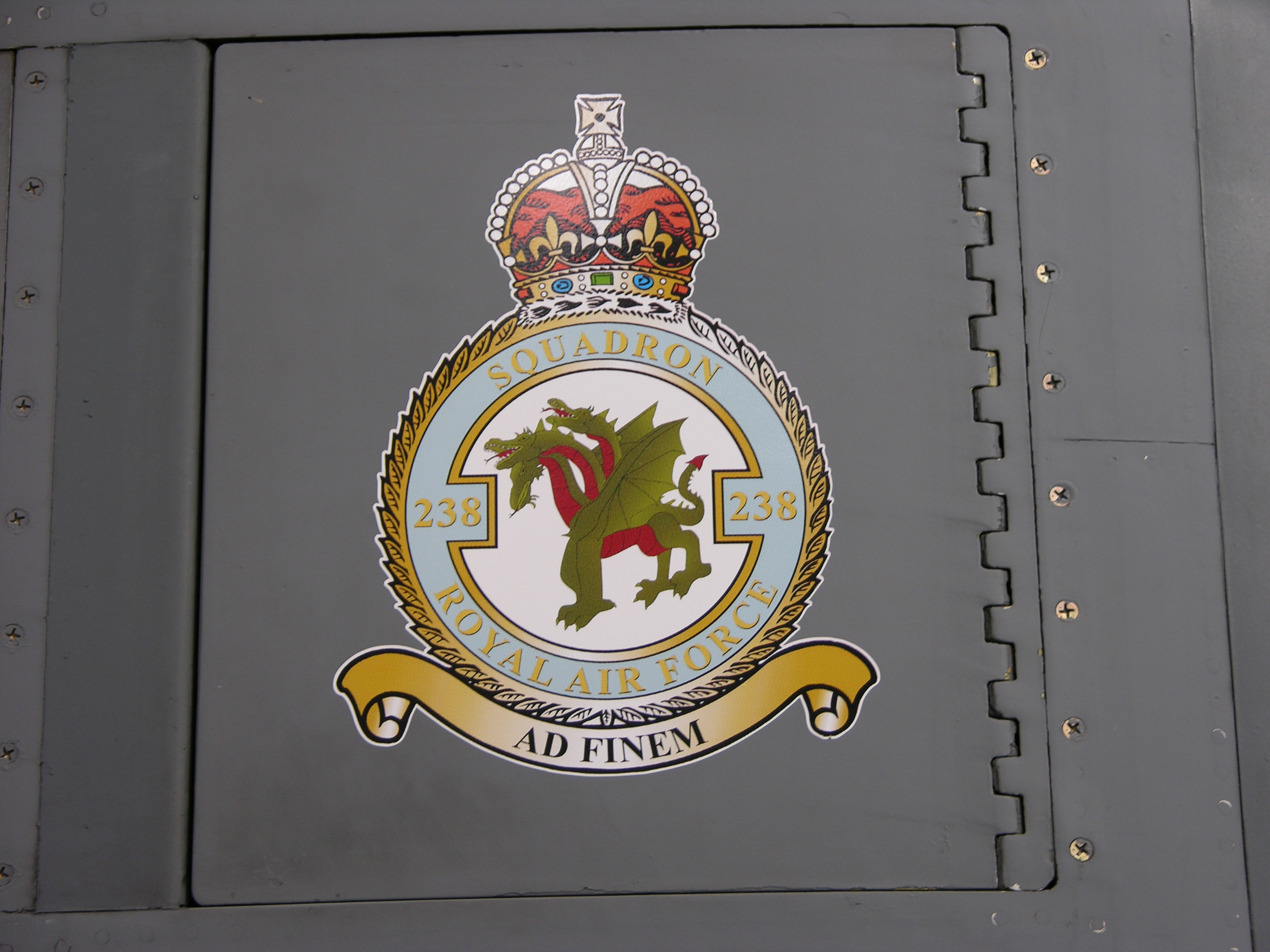
- Insignia of the squadron.
- Active: August 1918 - 20 March 1922; 16 May 1940 - 31 October 1944; 1 December 1944 - 27 December 1945; 1 December 1946 – 4 October 1948; 2007–present
- Country: United Kingdom
- Branch: Royal Air Force
- Part of: No. 1 School of Technical Training RAF
- Motto: Ad finem (Latin: To the end
- Battle honours: Battle of Britain

Insignia
- Squadron Badge: A three headed hydra. Hydras, in Greek mythology, were most difficult creatures to destroy.

No. 238 Squadron is a squadron of the Royal Air Force. It was first formed in 1918 by combining number 347, 348 and 349 Flights at RAF Cattewater by the Royal Flying Corps during the First World War. It was reformed for the Second World War, the Berlin Airlift and currently is a Line Training Flight (LTF) squadron based at RAF Cosford, albeit in a non-flying capacity. It is among those officially acknowledged Battle of Britain squadrons.

== World War I ==
The squadron was formed at RAF Cattewater (later RAF Mount Batten) in August 1918 by combining number 347, 348 and 349 Flights into the one squadron. All were flying boat flights and the squadron flew anti-submarine patrols until the end of the war, being reduced to a cadre on 15 May 1919. It remained as a storage unit until disbanded on 20 March 1922.

== World War II ==
=== Battle of Britain ===
July 1940 was the beginning of the Kanalkampf phase of the Battle of Britain. The Luftwaffe attacked English Channel convoys in an attempt to draw Fighter Command into combat and deplete its strength, attain air superiority, and ostensibly begin an amphibious invasion of England, codenamed Operation Sea Lion. The 10 July was the official opening of the Battle of Britain.

On 16 May 1940, 238 reformed at RAF Tangmere. On 2 July 1940 the squadron was declared operational and operated the Hawker Hurricane. The squadron commenced operations from RAF Middle Wallop. The following day 238 Squadron experienced its first aerial combat with Flight Lieutenant J.C Kennedy damaged a Junkers Ju 88 from 1(F)/123 [1st staffel, Aufklärungsgruppe 123—Reconnaissance Group 123] on a reconnaissance south of Middle Wallop. The Ju 88 piloted by Leutnant Wachtel suffered minor damage and Kennedy was hit by return-fire. On 13 July the squadron was given credit for two Bf 110s destroyed; one shared amongst four pilots.

==== Channel convoys ====
On 13 July, Flight Lieutenant J.C Kennedy became the first pilot killed in action. Once again in action with Aufklärungsgruppe 123, this time with 2 staffel, Kennedy shot down Leutnant Weinbauer's Dornier Do 17P over Chesil Beach, killing the crew. Kennedy appears to have suffered battle damage for he crash-landed at RAF Warmwell and was killed. A Do 17M from 4./Aufklärungsgruppe 123 crash-landed back in Caen, France, after being damaged in the same engagement. According to records, three pilots were credited with a shared Do 17; six more claimed two Bf 110s between them but this was marked unconfirmed.

Seven days later, the squadron flew standing combat patrols over convoy Bosom. Sergeant C Parkinson was killed in combat with Messerschmitt Bf 109s from JG 27, while the squadron destroyed a Heinkel He 59 floatplane from Seenotflugkommando 1; all four crew were killed. Parkinson was rescued by HMS Acheron but suffered fatal burns. 238 pilots were credited with two Bf 110s destroyed, one shared between two pilots, one Do 17 destroyed; two shared amongst four pilots and one Bf 110 went unconfirmed. Fighter Command recorded the He 59 as a damage claim, while one more Bf 109 was claimed destroyed, another as unconfirmed, and two pilots submitted a claim for another shared.

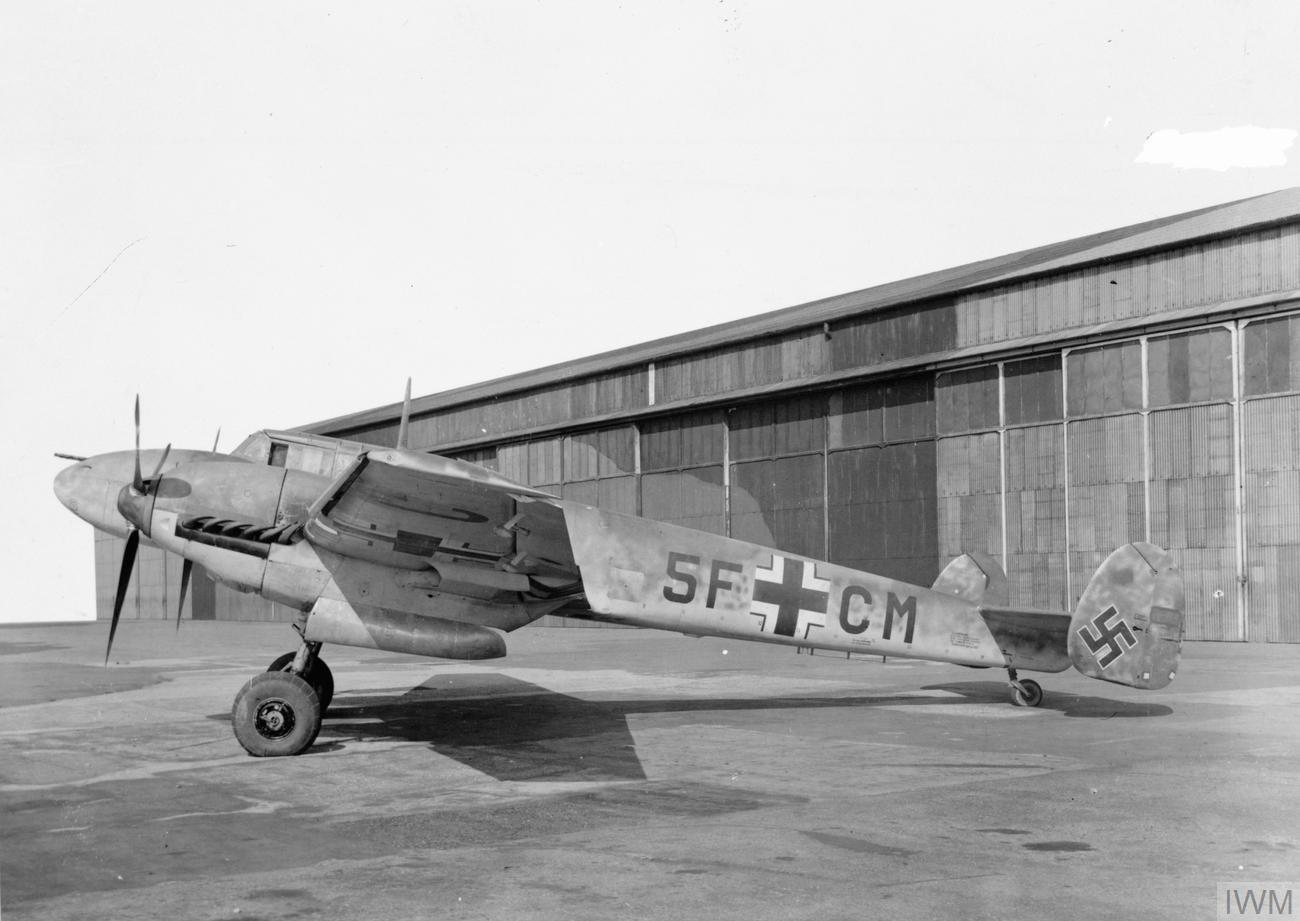
Bf 110 of 4(F)/14, downed by 238 in July 1940. The aircraft landed with minor damage and was captured

On 22 July, further combat patrols enabled 238 Squadron, now led by Squadron Leader Harold Fenton, to destroy two 4(F)/14 aircraft: a Do 17 and Messerschmitt Bf 110 with four crews posted missing in action in exchange for one damaged Hurricane. The squadron accounted for a Bf 109 from I./JG 27 on 26 July patrols. Twenty-four hours later the unit flew as escort for convoy Bacon. The pilots claimed one Junkers Ju 87 Stuka shot down from a 40-strong formation, but could not penetrate the fighter escort further. The Ju 87 came from I/StG 77.

On 1 August Fighter Command's order of battle placed 238 under the operational level command of No. 10 Group RAF, headquartered at Rudloe Manor in Wiltshire. Only three of the 12 squadron Hurricanes were operational. 238 shared Middle Wallop with 152, 604 and 609 Squadrons. 152 could field five of the 10 Supermarine Spitfires available, 604 had five from 11 Bristol Blenheims serviceable, while 609 listed six of its 10 Spitfires combat ready.

On 8 August, a series of naval and air actions occurred around convoy Peewit. In the late morning StG 2, StG 3 and StG 77 from Angers, Caen and St. Malo set out with their V./LG 1 escort, to attack the convoy south of the Isle of Wight, with approximately 30 Bf 109s from II. and III./JG 27 for high cover. From 12:20, Spitfires of 609 Squadron and Hurricanes from 257 and 145 squadrons attacked the German formations, joined later by 238 Squadron. The Ju 87s severely damaged SS Surte, MV Scheldt and SS Omlandia and sank SS Balmaha soon after. SS Tres was sunk by StG 77. SS Empire Crusader, in the lead, was hit by StG 2 and sank several hours later; four ships were sunk and four were damaged in the attacks. Between 20 and 30 RAF fighters attacked the German aircraft and I. and II./StG 2 suffered one damaged Ju 87 each, StG 3 lost three Stukas from I. Gruppe and two damaged. LG 1 lost one Bf 110 and three damaged, JG 27 lost three Bf 109s and two damaged, the three lost pilots coming from II. Gruppe. Three Hurricanes from 238 Squadron were shot down and two pilots were killed by Bf 109s. Squadron Leader H. A. Fenton was wounded while shooting down a He 59 floatplane and rescued by the trawler HMS Basset.

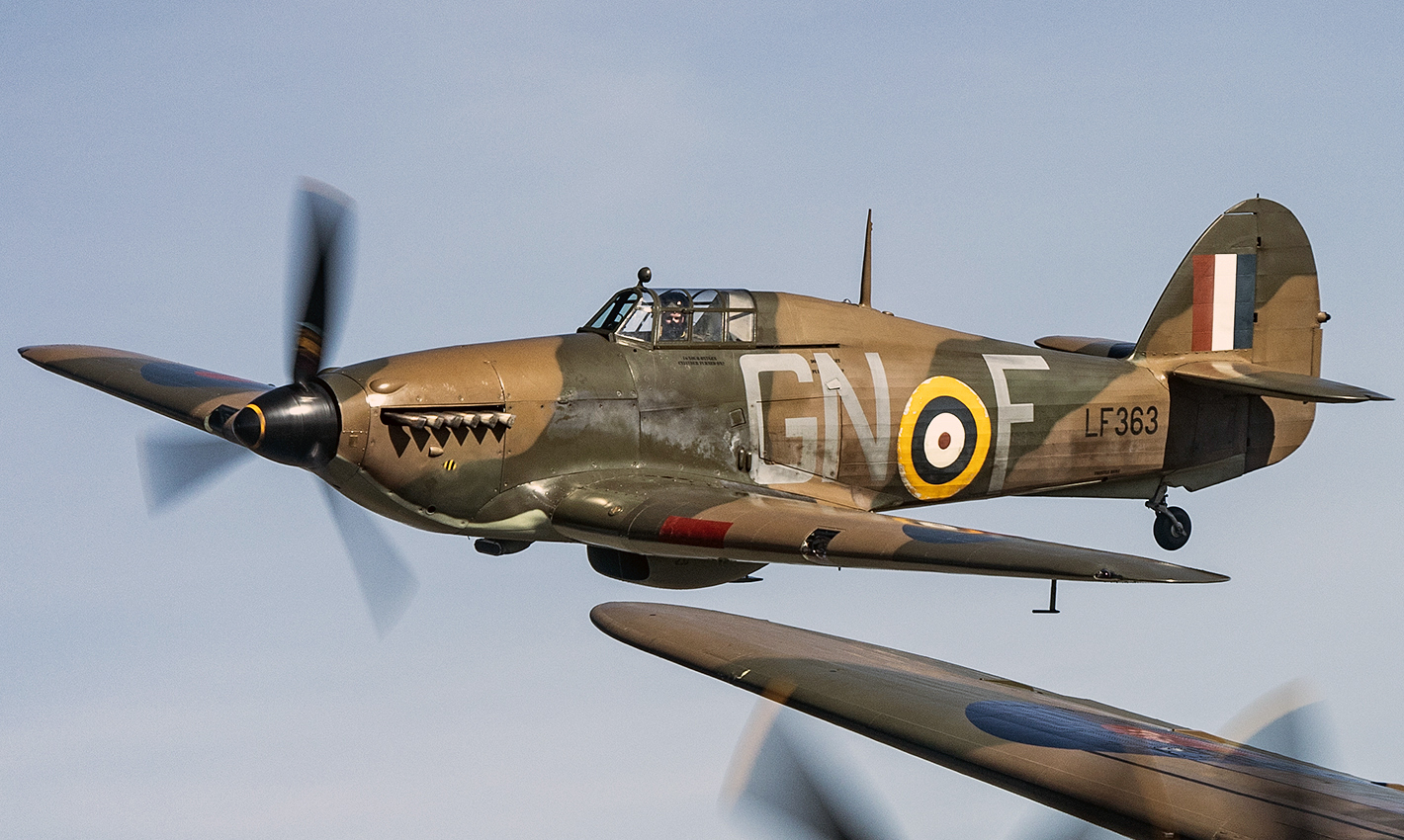
Hurricane I, the type flown by 238 in 1940

82 Ju 87s from III./StG 1, I./StG 3 and Stab, II./StG 77 were prepared for another operation. Major Walter Sigel led StG 3 to rendezvous with escorts from Bf 110s from II./Zerstörergeschwader 2 (ZG 2, Destroyer Wing 2), LG 1 and Bf 109s from II./JG 27. III./JG 26, II. and III./JG 51 flew a fighter sweep to clear the skies before the attack and engaged Nos. 41, 64 and 65 Squadrons. The ships of Peewit had sailed on and the anti-submarine yachts HMS Wilna, HMS Rion, trawlers HMS Cape Palliser, Kingston Chrysoberyl, Kingston Olivine and Stella Capella were attacked, having been sent to rescue survivors. Cape Palliser and Rion were badly damaged. 152 and 238 squadrons tried to intercept but failed to make contact with the attackers but 152 Squadron met Bf 109s from JG 53 12 miles (19 km) south of Swanage and two Spitfires were damaged and force-landed, the pilots unhurt. II./JG 53 claimed two Spitfires and a Hurricane for no loss. II./JG 53 commanded by Günther Freiherr von Maltzahn flew from Guernsey.

On 11 August the final round of convoy attacks began on Convoys Booty, Agent and Arena. Keith Park, Air Officer Commanding, No. 11 Group RAF identified the convoys and naval base at Isle of Portland as the Germans' main objective for the day. Radar detected a large build-up over the Cherbourg peninsula. He ordered 609 and 1 Squadron up from Warmwell and RAF Tangmere. Six other units from Middle Wallop and Exeter, Tangmere and Warmwell were ordered to readiness. Some 53 fighters were now involved. The German formation approached in strength in the late morning. Around 54 Ju 88s from I., and II./KG 54 were supported by 20 Heinkel He 111s from KG 27. I., and II./ZG 2 provided 61 Bf 110s as escort which were reinforced by 30 Bf 109s from III./JG 2 under the command of Erich Mix. JG 27 provided withdrawal cover. It was the largest raid yet sent against a British target. Within a minute from 10:04, 145, 152, 87, 213 and 238 Squadrons were scrambled to support the two airborne Squadrons.

JG 27 were involved in combat as they covered the raid's withdrawal. JG 27 lost three of its number to 238 and 145 squadrons but the German fighters destroyed three 238 Hurricanes, killing two pilots. 145 suffered two damaged and two destroyed and two pilots killed. The massive dogfight resulted in the loss of 16 Hurricanes with 13 pilots killed and two wounded. A 152 Squadron Spitfire was lost and its pilot drowned. German losses amounted to six Bf 110s, five Ju 88s, one He 111 and six Bf 109s. The number of aircraft lost over the Channel prompted both sides to send forces out to locate survivors. Squadron Leader H A Fenton was wounded after being shot down by a He 59 float plane he was attacking and rescued. The two dead pilots were Flight Lieutenant D E Turner and Flying Officer D C McCaw.

==== Adlerangriff ====
On 13 August, the main German offensive "Adlertag" began against Fighter Command airfields. Unaware of the German intent, the controllers directed three full Squadrons and detachments of three others were alerted by 06:15. 238 was moved to cover their own base at RAF Warmwell. A mistake by the Observer Corps allowed KG 2 to slip through the net, but their bombing raid against RAF Hornchurch achieved little. I./KG 54 struck at the Fleet Air Arm (FAA) base at Gosport. ZG 2 was supposed to provide escort during one these attacks, and in a breakdown of communications, arrived over the target without their Ju 88s, which had been ordered to stand down. One ZG 2 Bf 110 was recorded destroyed and two more damaged. 238 pilots claimed one He 111, one Do 17, five Bf 109s destroyed, and one probably destroyed, five Bf 110s destroyed, two probably destroyed and four damaged.

In an afternoon development, I./LG 1 abandoned an attack on Boscombe Down and bombed Southampton instead. 238 Squadron had been detailed to intercept, but the fighter escort was too strong and the bombers were not diverted from their course. Several warehouses were destroyed and a cold storage plant was also knocked out. All fires were under control by dusk. Luftwaffe intelligence had not identified the Southampton Spitfire factory—on the waterfront near the docks—as an important target. Poor intelligence suggested it was a bomber factory. Only later, in September, was it attacked and severely damaged. However, even then the Germans were unaware of the damage inflicted to Spitfire production. The factory would later be broken up and production dispersed.

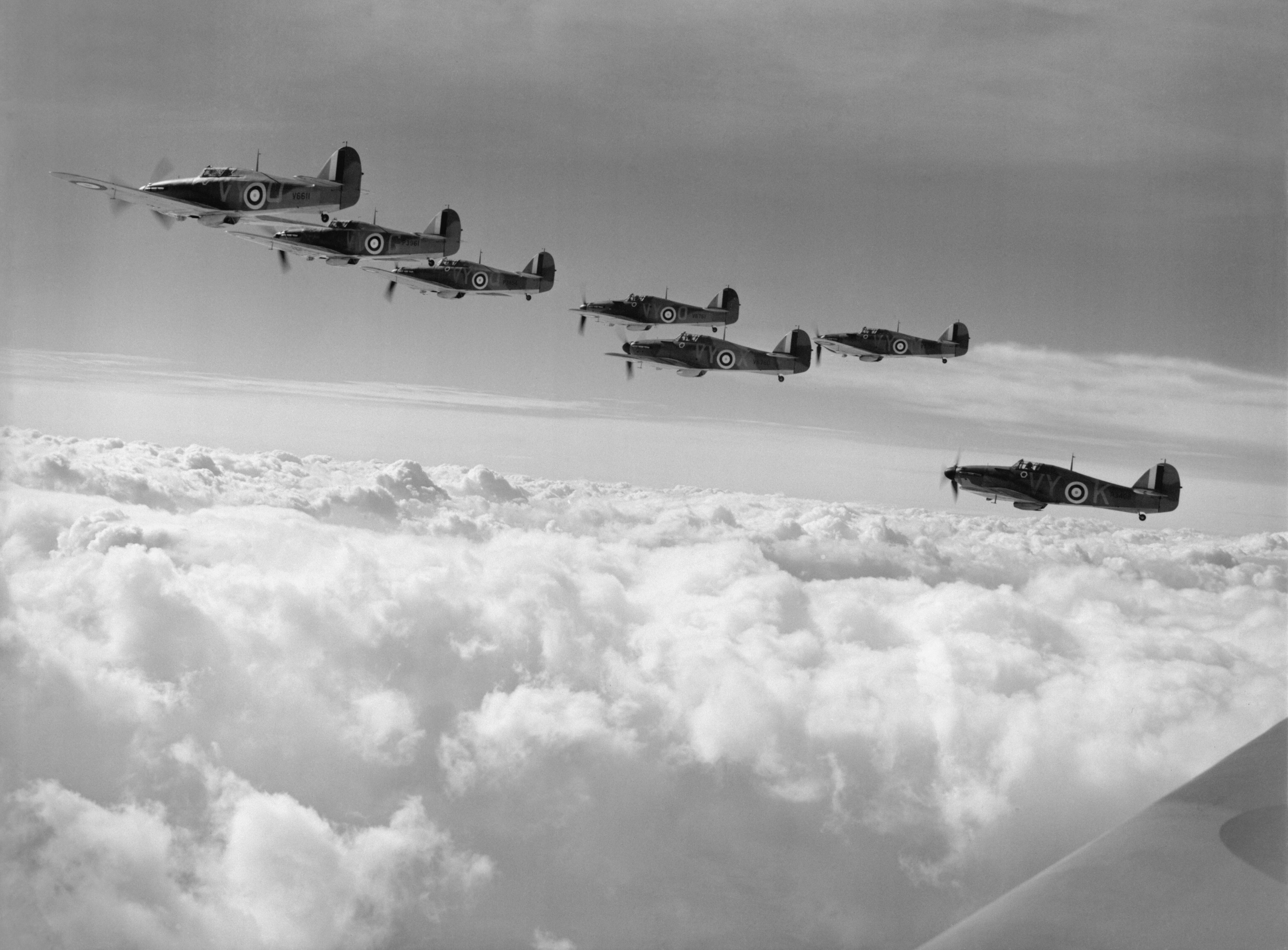
Hurricanes using the Vic formation, 1940

238 Squadron lost three Hurricanes with another damaged in combat with Bf 109s on 13 August. Sergeant L G Batt survived, Sergeant E W Seaborne was rescued by a destroyed with severe burns. Sergeant H J Marsh was killed and Sergeant R Little was unhurt. 238 moved to St Eval in Cornwall on 14 August. Scarcely six weeks old, and a veteran unit already, the squadron was moved to rest in the quieter South West England. The squadron was considered among those "hard-pressed" units and was removed from the frontline personally by Hugh Dowding. Squadron Leader Fenton commented on the cosmopolitan makeup of the Squadron; "The Poles and Czechs were vital as it turned out. It was amazing how quickly we became real friends. I flew with a Pole on one side and a Czech on the other and was delighted to be so well looked after."

The only action of note of the month came on 21 August when a single Ju 88 dropped six bombs on the airfield, destroying one hangar. 238 scrambled and gave chase but did not catch the intruder. In the afternoon three Ju 88s of Kampfgruppe 806 [coastal reconnaissance group] were intercepted; two were shot down. Maps and charts washed ashore from the wrecks indicated the targets were Newquay and Penzance. Leutnant zur See von Davidson and Mieher were lost with their crews [Luftwaffe coastal airmen sometimes carried Kriegsmarine ranks].

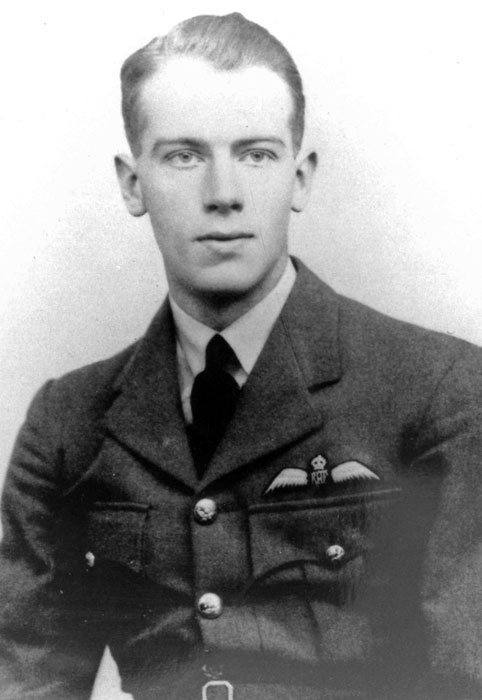
Bob Doe, during World War II

On 1 September 1940, 238 were based at St Eval with a strength of 11 Hurricanes and only four operational. 236 Squadron was the only other unit to occupy the airfield. Squadron Leader Fenton still commanded the squadron according to the order of battle, though he was absent after wounds sustained in August. The squadron was being commanded by Flight Lieutenant Minden Blake, who had taken over the previous month. On 11 September the squadron lost three Hurricanes in combat over Greater London; one pilot, Flight Lieutenant David Price Hughes, a fighter ace with five victories, was killed and another, Pilot Officer William Tower-Perkins was wounded in battle with Ju 88s over Tunbridge Wells. William Tower Perkins was treated for severe burns, and became a founder-member and the first secretary of the Guinea Pig Club, a mutual support and social group for injured aircrew.

On 15 September 1940 238 Squadron fought in the large air battles termed the "Battle of Britain Day". No. 11 Group RAF and No. 12 Group RAF were committed in other areas forcing Park to request 238 to Middle Wallop. The squadron was ordered to cover RAF Kenley. The squadron had all but one of the 18 Hurricanes assigned to it available for combat. 238 Squadron formed the defence against the large air raids at noon. With support from 602 and 609, the squadron went in first against Kampfgeschwader 53 Heinkel He 111s and their escorts. The other two squadrons attacked Kampfgeschwader 2 Do 17s. Six KG 53 bombers were destroyed and two damaged, though 1, 66, 229, 242 and 504 and 92 squadrons inflicted losses on the unit. Fighter Command reported one loss for the squadron plus three more damaged. Leslie Pidd was flying P2836 that day and was in combat along with at least five of his squadron including Minden Blake. At 2:50pm two pilots suffered damage but escaped as did Pilot Officer Simmonds. Flight Sergeant Pidd was shot down soon after by a Messerschmitt Bf 110. There was confusion over what happened to end Leslie's life but an eye witness confirmed that he crashed with his aircraft in the grounds of Kent College Pembury. Margaret James in her book says that "Term started in September as normally as possible...it was then that the reality of war touched the school most closely when a Brirish Hurricane fighter plane was shot down in the grounds... There are painful memories of the screaming noise as the plane descended. The inimitable Miss Barrett, Matron... was first on the spot, and it was she who picked up the shattered remains of the dead pilot and covered the body in a cloth before the stretcher bearers arrived a little later." The school paid tribute to Leslie Pidd in 2010 at a special commemoration day and the unveiling of a mosaic to remember his sacrifice. (Sergeant L Pidd was killed after he baled out in combat with Bf 110s but his parachute did not deploy. Recent sources state Pidd baled out too low when he hit a tree at low-level during a dogfight—he was the only 238 casualty on 15 September.)238 patrolled over Middle Wallop in the evening but no known interception took place. 238 claimed four He 111s destroyed, one probably destroyed and two damaged along with two Bf 110s destroyed and an unidentified type damaged.

The squadron achieved a victory over a Ju 88 from 1./LG 1 on 21 September which crashed and killed the crew. On 25 September 238 intercepted Kampfgeschwader 55 over Dorset. They targeted the Westland aircraft factory at Yeovil with 100 tons of bombs and 24 incendiaries. Supported by 152 Squadron they destroyed five bombers and another damaged. Sergeant F A Silbey baled out was reported shot down by Bf 110s; Zerstörergeschwader 26 was known to be operating in the area and reported two losses and two damaged on 25 September. The following day KG 55 struck at the Woolston factory covered by 70 Bf 110s. 229, 238 and 303 Squadrons intercepted. Three 238 Hurricanes were lost with one pilot killed; Sergeant V Horsky. Squadron Leader Fenton was reported shot down by unidentified Bf 109s but survived. R A King, the third pilot survived apparently unhurt. I and I Gruppe ZG 26 reported one Bf 110 each shot down with the loss of their crews in combat with 238. Only a single 2./KG 55 was shot down because of strong protection from ZG 26. Despite the interception, 59 Heinkels dropped 70 tons of bombs on the factory bringing production to a halt. Three complete Spitfires, were destroyed, 20 damaged and 37 people were killed in the factory and 52 in surrounding areas. 238 pilots claimed four Bf 110s destroyed and five damaged. Three He 111s were claimed destroyed.

On 27 September Pilot Officer Bob Doe joined 238 Squadron. Four days later he shot down a ZG 26 Bf 110 but 238 lost two Hurricanes and Sergeant F A Sibley killed.

On 28th September the squadron composed of Squadron Leader Fenton, Pilot Officer Simmonds, Pilot Officer David Stewart Harrison, Sergeant Batt, Sergeant Bann, Sergeant Sibley, Pilot Officer Urwin-Mann, Sergeant Jeka, Pilot Officer Covington, Sergeant Little, Pilot Officer Rozycki and Sergeant Kucera of took off at 14:23 and all twelve directed to the East of the Isle of Wight where they encountered 25 ME110 enemy aircraft supported by (an unknown number of) ME109s. The squadron attacked but in doing so it was attacked by the ME109s. Pilot Officer Rozycki destroyed one ME110. Pilot Officer Simmonds landed at Andover to refuel and badly damaged his aircraft when he hit a hedge during take off. Sergeant Eric Bann was shot down and bailed out over the Isle of Wight but his parachute did not open and he died when his body fell to earth in Brading Marshes. Sergeant R Little did not return nor did Pilot Officer Harrison in his Hurricane N2546 who was shot down over the Solent and crashed off Bembridge, Isle of Wight. His body washed ashore at Brighton on 9th October. Fighter Command performed poorly on the day, claiming four for the loss of 11 Hurricanes four Spitfires and nine pilots killed. German tactics had changed to using faster Bf 110s and Ju 88s as fighter-bombers, and providing them with strong Bf 109 escorting forces. Over 200 German fighters flew into action.

On 30 September 238 was operating again, losing two Hurricanes in a collision, wounding one of the pilots. Doe and another pilot accounted for a I and II/KG 55 destroyed south of Portland. German raids over the southwest persisted and on 7 October 238 intercepted 25 Ju 88s from KG 51 with escort from I, II and III/ZG 26. Five other squadrons were involved in the battle, but 238 accounted for one of the two Ju 88s shot down; Doe receiving credit. At least one of the seven Bf 110s lost by ZG 26 were credited to 238. Bf 109s intervened to cover the German withdrawal and Pilot Officer A R Covington was shot down and wounded. Three days later, Doe was wounded in combat with an unidentified Bf 109 unit.

The Battle of Britain officially ended on 31 October 1940. Fighter Command still had to deal with hit-and-run tactics by the Luftwaffe. Bf 109s equipped with bombs carried out these operations alongside fighter sweeps over southern England. On 5 Novembelr 1940 Sergeant J Jeka and Pilot Officer B B Considine became victims of such operations, shot down by Bf 109s near Bournemouth, though both men survived. 238 were on patrol when attacked by Bf 109s probably belonging to JG 2 and led by Helmut Wick, one of the leading German fighter pilots and at the time of his death, the most successful of the war. The following day, 238 experienced its last fatality of the year, when Pilot Officer J Tillett, 238 Squadron was killed in action with JG 2.

In January 1941, 238 were operating from Chilbolton under the command of 10 Group.

During the BoB, several Polish pilots served in the squadron. Shooting down in Sq 238 (Certain - Probable-Damaged) in brackets, ranks during service in the squadron. Sgt Marian Domagała (3 -0 -0) Sgt Duszyński Stanisław Sgt Józef Jeka (4 +1/2 - 0 - 1) P / O Różycki Stanisław (2 - 0 - 2) F / O Stęborowski Michał (1 - 0 - 0)

=== Malta and North Africa ===
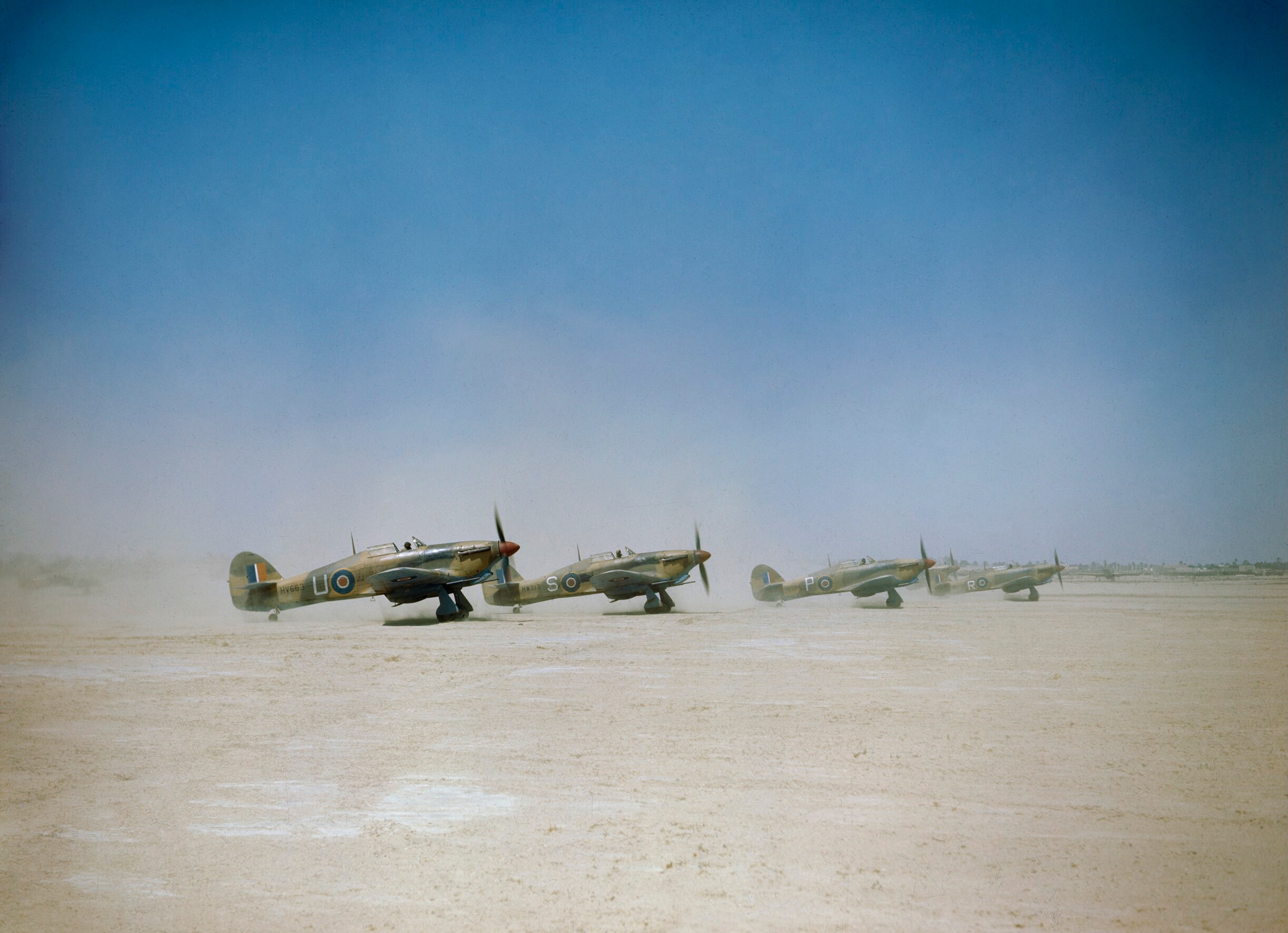
Hurricane IIs, North Africa. 238 Squadron operated the type into 1942

In May 1941 the squadron left for the Middle East its aircraft being flown off HMS Victorious to Malta while the ground echelon sailed round the Cape of Good Hope. 28 Hurricanes of 238 flew to the island and as soon as refuelling had been complete flew seven hours to eastern Egypt. After refuelling in Malta the Hurricanes flew on to the Western Desert where they were attached to No. 274 Squadron on 15 June 1941, pending the arrival of the squadron's own ground crews. 238 operated from LG 109 alongside 1 Squadron SAAF from 20 October 1941. They escorted six Blenheims from 113 and No. 55 Squadron RAF to Gambut. II/JG 27 intercepted and shot down two Blenheims, two 238 Squadron pilots and one 1 SAAF pilot. Sergeants Savy baled out and Knappett crash-landed, though he returned to the unit later. The South African pilot was captured. Another Hurricane was lost in action with this unit on 30 October. From 17 November 1941, 238 was assigned to 258 Wing for the upcoming Operation Crusader.

By the end of July, No. 238 was again operating as a complete unit, flying escort missions and fighter patrols throughout the campaign in the desert until after the Battle of El Alamein. Even so, some Beaufighters belonging to the squadron were based at RAF Pembrey temporarily during 1943.

The squadron was then withdrawn to Egypt for air defence duties and converted to Spitfires in September 1943. In March 1944, the squadron moved to Corsica for sweeps over Northern Italy and in August covered the Allied landings in Southern France. After moving there for two months, it was withdrawn to Naples and disbanded on 26 October 1944.

=== Asia and the Pacific ===
On 1 December 1944, No. 238 reformed at RAF Merryfield as a transport squadron and was originally intended to fly Albemaries. In January 1945 it received Dakotas and on 14 February its first wave of ten aircraft left for India where they began supply-dropping and casualty evacuation missions over Burma. In June the squadron moved to Australia to provide transport support for the British Pacific Fleet as part of No. 300 Group, officially disbanding there on 27 December 1945.

== Disbandment, Cold War, current use ==
Its remaining aircraft left for Singapore on 9 February 1946, others having been flown back to the UK during January.

On 1 December 1946, 525 Squadron at Abingdon was renumbered 238 Squadron and flew Dakotas until renumbered 10 Squadron on 4 October 1948, during the Berlin airlift.

In 2007 Line Training Flight (LTF) at RAF Cosford were permitted to use the squadron numberplate as a non-flying unit. The role undertaken is that of LTF and mechanical maintenance. Jaguars were formerly used on the taxiways at the RAF Cosford airfield site to train students in marshaling aircraft, this leaves only the Synthetic Environment Procedural Trainer (SEPT) to train marshalling and airfield situational awareness. The SEPT was initially designed in the early 2000s to supplement training on live running aircraft. Despite the loss of live running aircraft, the squadron remains extant. 238 Squadron were awarded an AOC 22 Group Commendation in the 2025 Kings New Years Honours
