= Master of the fleet =

Historical rank in the British Royal Navy

Master of the Fleet
- Ensign of the Royal Navy
- Admiralty
- Formation: c.1620

In the Royal Navy, the rank of master of the fleet denoted the sailing master of a fleet flagship, or the senior sailing master in a fleet.

== History ==
Examples include John Bowen (master of the fleet during the Glorious First of June 1794), Ian Hogg, and John H. D. Cunningham. By 1814, the title granted the master extra pay. By 1832, the masters of the fleet were given the equivalent rank and uniform of commanders. By 1843, masters were appointed by commission not warrant. By 1864, the title was changed to "staff captain" and ranked after the regular rank of captain, while masters who had served at least 15 years were given the new rank of "staff commander" and ranked after commander.

During the First World War the title was revived for the Grand Fleet's senior Navigation Officer.

The title has been used outside the Royal Navy, such as in Ultramarines and other science fiction, and for the captain of the Belle of Louisville.
