= John Gibbon (British Army officer) =

British Army general

General Sir John Gibbon GCB OBE
- Born: 21 September 1917
- Died: 1997
- Military career
- Allegiance: United Kingdom
- Branch: British Army
- Service years: 1939–1977
- Rank: General
- Unit: Royal Artillery
- Commands: Master-General of the Ordnance; Vice-Chief of the Defence Staff; 6th Field Regiment Royal Artillery
- Conflicts: Second World War
- Awards: Knight Grand Cross of the Order of the Bath; Officer of the Order of the British Empire

General Sir John Houghton Gibbon, GCB, OBE (21 September 1917 – 1997) was a British Army officer who served as Master-General of the Ordnance from 1974 until his retirement in 1977.

== Military career ==
Gibbon was commissioned into the Royal Artillery in 1939. He served in the Second World War with 2nd Regiment Royal Horse Artillery in France, the Western Desert, Greece, Sicily and North West Europe.

After the war, Gibbon became an instructor and subsequently chief instructor at the Royal Military Academy Sandhurst. In 1955 he was appointed Assistant Quartermaster General at the War Office and then, in 1959, he became commanding officer of 6th Field Regiment Royal Artillery within British Army of the Rhine. In 1962 he was made a brigade commander in Cyprus and then, later that year, he became Director of Defence Plans at the Ministry of Defence. He was Secretary to Chiefs of Staff Committee and Director of Defence Operations (Staff) from 1966 to 1969, when he became Director of Army Staff Duties at the Ministry of Defence. He was appointed Vice-Chief of the Defence Staff in 1972 and Master-General of the Ordnance in 1974. He retired in 1977.

Gibbon was an ADC General to the Queen.

Military offices
| Preceded by Sir John Barraclough | Vice-Chief of the Defence Staff; 1972–1973 | Succeeded by Sir Peter Le Cheminant |
| Preceded by Sir Noel Thomas | Master-General of the Ordnance; 1974–1977 | Succeeded by Sir Hugh Beach |
