= Minden Blake =

New Zealand flying ace

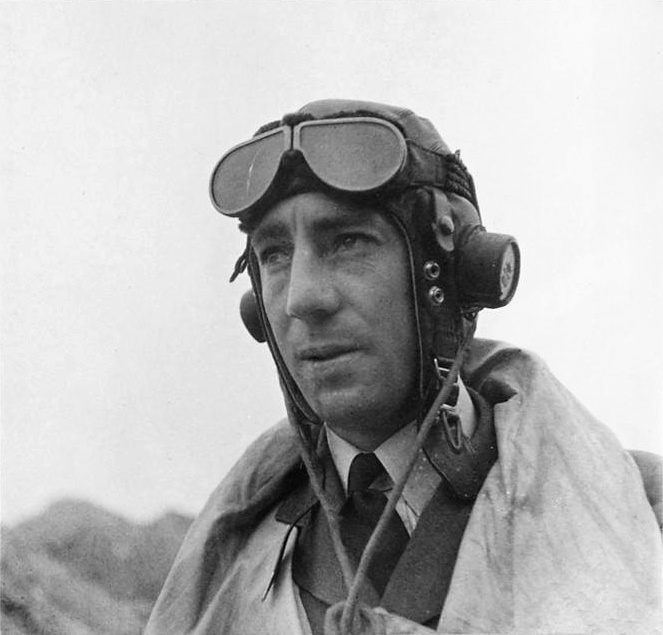
- Born: 13 February 1913; Eketāhuna, New Zealand
- Died: 30 November 1981 (aged 68); Surrey, England
- Military career
- Allegiance: New Zealand
- Branch: Royal Air Force
- Service years: 1936–1958
- Rank: Wing Commander
- Service number: 36095
- Commands: No. 238 Squadron; No. 234 Squadron; Exeter (Polish) Wing; Portreath Wing
- Conflicts: Second World War; Battle of Britain; Circus offensive; Dieppe Raid
- Awards: Distinguished Service Order; Distinguished Flying Cross; Mentioned in despatches (2)

Minden Vaughan Blake DSO, DFC (13 February 1913 – 30 November 1981) was a New Zealand flying ace of the Royal Air Force (RAF) during the Second World War. He is credited with shooting down thirteen aircraft.

Born in Eketāhuna, New Zealand, Blake earned bachelor's and master's degrees in science from Canterbury University College. In 1936, he joined the RAF after twice missing out on a Rhodes Scholarship and was posted to No. 17 Squadron. He participated in the Battle of Britain in 1940 as acting commander of No. 238 Squadron and then No. 234 Squadron, destroying several German bombers. He was awarded the Distinguished Flying Cross in January 1941. By mid-1942, he was commanding a fighter wing. He was shot down on 19 August during aerial operations in support of the Dieppe Raid and became a prisoner of war. He had been awarded the Distinguished Service Order just a few days previously.

After the war, he continued to serve in the RAF in a series of senior posts until 1958. In civilian life, he worked for a number of manufacturing companies. He was also an inventor, developing a golfing aid that was a commercial success. He died in Surrey in 1981, aged 68.

== Early life ==
Minden Vaughan Blake was born in Eketāhuna, in the Manawatū District of New Zealand on 13 February 1913. The son of a schoolmaster, Charles Minden Blake, and his wife, Emma, he was educated at Southland Boys' High School from 1926 to 1929 and then Christchurch Boys' High School. He was heavily involved in sports, participating in cricket, soccer, and athletics. He would go on to become national champion in the pole vault in 1936.

Commencing his tertiary education in early 1932, Blake entered Canterbury University College and gained a Bachelor of Science degree three years later. His father financially supported his studies by purchasing a chicken farm and Blake developed technology for grading eggs. After graduating in 1934, he progressed to graduate studies, studying mathematics. The following year, he was one of the college's two representatives for a Rhodes Scholarship. He was not selected and a subsequent attempt in 1936 was also unsuccessful. In the meantime, he graduated with a master of science with second-class honours. He spent much of 1936 as a lecturer in physics at the university and then applied to join the Royal Air Force (RAF) under its university entrant scheme, intending to study engineering in England once he completed flying training.

== Military career ==
The RAF accepted Blake's application and he left for England in November 1936. He began his flying training late the following month at the Elementary and Reserve Flying Training School at Brough Aerodrome, in Yorkshire. He was granted a permanent commission in the RAF as a pilot officer, with the service number 36095, in March 1937, at the conclusion of his course. He was posted to No. 5 Flying Training School at Sealand. He gained his pilot's wings in June and was selected for training on fighters, learning on the Hawker Fury fighter. He completed his training a few months later and was posted to No. 17 Squadron, which operated Gloster Gauntlet fighters from Kenley.

In September 1937 Blake was promoted to flying officer and became one of No. 17 Squadron's flight commanders. In March 1939, Blake received a further promotion, to flight lieutenant, and a few months later, the squadron moved to North Weald where it began converting to Hawker Hurricane fighters. He remained active in pole vaulting, becoming the RAF champion three years running from 1937 to 1939.

== Second World War ==
On 8 September 1939, a few days after the outbreak of the Second World War, Blake suffered minor injuries in an aircraft accident. During an attempted landing at Croydon in the early evening, his Hurricane's engine failed and he overshot the runway and crash landed in the grounds of Purley Hospital. In doing so, the wing of his aircraft clipped the chimney of a building that Blake failed to see due to the fading light. This caused the Hurricane to flip as it landed. Blake's head was gashed and he was heavily bruised. The engine failure was due to hay, from the cutting of the grass around the airfield, entering the air intake.

For the first several months of the war, the squadron mainly flew from Debden and Martlesham Heath but saw little action during this time. In April 1940, Blake was sent to join the staff at No. 10 Flying Training School at Ternhill in Shropshire; he acted as an instructor in the advanced section of the school. After four months, he was posted to No. 238 Squadron, based at St Eval and operating Hurricanes, to take over as its acting commander. Commencing his new role on 16 August, the squadron was part of No. 10 Group, which covered southwest England.

=== Battle of Britain ===
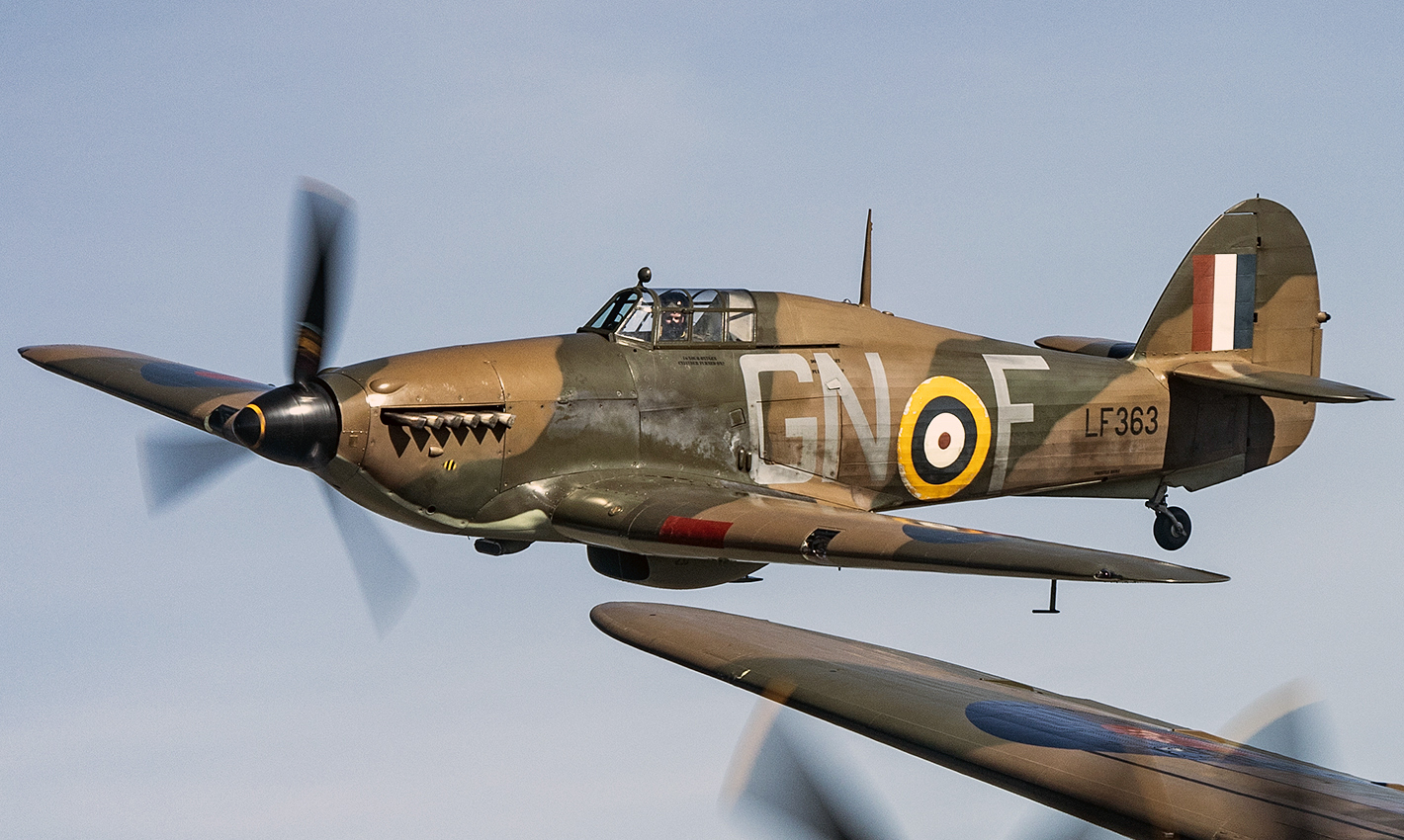
Hawker Hurricane Mk. I, the type flown by No. 238 Squadron in 1940

Within days of his arrival, Blake achieved his first aerial victory, when he shot down a Junkers Ju 88 medium bomber to the north of Trevose Head on 21 August. Six days later he shared in the destruction of a Dornier Do 17 medium bomber. In September, No. 238 Squadron moved east to the RAF's Middle Wallop station, in Hampshire. Being much closer to London, it began to be called upon to assist No. 11 Group in defending the Luftwaffe's campaign against the city and on 11 September, Blake destroyed a Ju 88 over Brooklands in Surrey.

In the mid-afternoon of 15 September, what is now known as Battle of Britain Day, No. 238 Squadron was scrambled and sent eastwards to help protect London from a large Luftwaffe attack, involving nearly 120 bombers accompanied by over 400 fighters. Blake led the squadron into an engagement with Heinkel He 111 medium bombers over Kenley. He destroyed one He 111, the resulting wreckage crashing on an airfield in Sussex. His own aircraft was damaged in the encounter and he made an emergency landing close by his victim.

Later that month, the original commander of No. 238 Squadron returned to duty. Blake, promoted to acting squadron leader, took over as commander of No. 234 Squadron. This was part of No. 10 Group and operated Supermarine Spitfire Mk I fighters from St Eval. Having suffered a number of losses while based at its previous station, Middle Wallop, the move to Cornwall was for a period of duty at a lowered operational tempo, with fewer sorties. On 24 November Blake shared in the destruction of a Do 17 near Falmouth. On 29 November, the squadron provided an aerial escort for the destroyer HMS Javelin, damaged in an encounter with German destroyers, as the ship made its way into Plymouth. Several Do 17s mounted an attack on Javelin but Blake shot down two of these. After the ship arrived in Plymouth, the commander of Javelin, Captain Louis Mountbatten, personally thanked Blake for the squadron's efforts.

In January 1941, Blake's award of the Distinguished Flying Cross was announced. The published citation read:

Squadron Leader Blake has displayed fine qualities of leadership and has personally destroyed five enemy aircraft. By his splendid example he has set a high standard to his fellow pilots.

— London Gazette, No. 35037, 7 January 1941.

=== Circus offensive ===
In February No. 234 Squadron moved to Warmwell, where it began to re-equip with the Spitfire Mk IIa and changed duties; instead of only defensive patrols, it began to undertake offensive operations over occupied France and Belgium as part of the RAF's Circus offensive. On 11 March, Blake shared in the destruction of a Messerschmitt Bf 110 heavy fighter to the southwest of the Isle of Portland. Later that month, he was mentioned in despatches.

Blake shot down a Ju 88 south of the Isle of Portland on 8 May, and this was followed by the destruction of a Messerschmitt Bf 109 fighter near Swanage four days later. On 10 July, while escorting Bristol Blenheim light bombers on an attack on shipping at Cherbourg, the squadron was attacked by a formation of Bf 109s. Blake managed to destroy two of these but his Spitfire was damaged by enemy fire in the course of the encounter and he was forced to ditch in the English Channel. His aircraft sank before he could extricate himself but he was able to kick free and on reaching the surface inflated his emergency dinghy. He paddled towards England for several hours before being picked by an Air Sea Rescue Services launch.

At the start of August, Blake was made an acting wing commander and appointed leader of the Polish Wing, a fighter wing made up of Polish squadrons, operating from Exeter. His period in command was brief for on 21 September he was appointed wing leader of No. 10 Group's Portreath Wing. One of the last major engagements of the year for Blake was in October, when he led the Portreath Wing to St. Omer as part of the escort for Blenheims bombing the town. The RAF was experiencing a high casualty rate by this time, so there was a reduction in offensive missions over the winter months. At the end of the year, he was formally appointed as a temporary wing commander.

Blake continued as commander of the Portreath Wing into 1942 and when offensive fighter operations resumed in March, he led his wing on long-range patrols between Cherbourg and Brest. During this time he was also involved in the development of a gyroscopic gunsight for fighters. This combined a conventional deflector gunsight with aspects of a bombsight, and Blake conducted several tests with the device. In August 1942, his award of the Distinguished Service Order (DSO) was announced, the published citation reading:

During the past 10 months, this officer has completed numerous sorties, including several attacks on enemy shipping. He has rendered valuable service and his leadership has been of the highest order. He has destroyed at least 9 hostile aircraft.

— London Gazette, No. 35667, 14 August 1942.

A few days later, on 19 August, Blake led the Portreath Wing in support of the Dieppe Raid. Flying cover over the ships of the landing force, they encountered a group of Focke-Wulf Fw 190 fighters. Blake, flying with the wing's No. 130 Squadron, destroyed one Fw 190 but his own Spitfire was damaged. His canopy was shattered from a cannon shell impact, and shards of perspex entered his eyes. He ditched his Spitfire in the English Channel, not far from the French coast, and took to his emergency dinghy. Despite the injuries to his eyes, he paddled towards England, helped by an outgoing tide. He spent nearly a day in the dinghy until he was retrieved by a German rescue launch and made a prisoner of war (POW). He was the highest-ranking officer of the RAF to be captured as a result of the Dieppe Raid.

=== Prisoner of war ===
Because of the injuries to his eyes, Blake was hospitalised in France for three weeks before being transported to Germany by train. While in transit, he jumped from a window of the train but in doing so, he received injuries to a hand and lacerations to his head. He made his way to a nearby French farmhouse where he sought treatment. The owner of the farm, concerned for the safety of his family if the Germans were to discover Blake at his property, turned him over to the authorities.

Blake spent most of the remainder of the war at Stalag Luft III, a POW camp located near Sagan, in Germany. By 1943 he was the senior RAF officer in charge of the camp's Block 104 and it was in this capacity that he met Leonard Trent, a fellow New Zealander with the RAF who had recently become a POW. During their leisure time, Trent introduced Blake to golf, fashioning a home-made golf ball and scrounging a club for practice. In return, Blake taught Trent basic gymnastic techniques, going as far to construct a set of parallel bars. By January 1945, the Soviet forces were advancing into Germany and the POWs at Stalag Luft III were force marched to the west to a camp near Bremen. They were moved again in April but were liberated by the British on 2 May.

== Postwar career ==
In the immediate postwar period, Blake spent several months in New Zealand on leave. During this time, he met and married Molly, née Seldon, from Christchurch. He returned with her to England to resume his career with the RAF. In early 1946, he was posted to Fighter Command headquarters as a staff officer. He was presented with his DSO by King George VI in an investiture at Buckingham Palace in February. His temporary wing commander rank was made substantive later in the year and he was again mentioned in despatches in early 1947. Shortly afterwards he was sent on a course at the RAF College at Bracknell. His following post was at Transport Command headquarters working on operational matters. He remained keen on golf; when his fellow former POW Leonard Trent, also assigned to Transport Command at the time, visited its headquarters he noted the presence of a practice pad in Blake's office. Blake resumed his pole vaulting career and was again RAF champion, in 1946 and 1948–1949. He was in the running to make the British track and field team for the 1948 Summer Olympics.

In 1950, Blake switched to personnel duties, this time for Bomber Command. A role at the North Atlantic Treaty Organization (NATO) followed, when he was posted to Oslo as Inspector-General for Northern Command, NATO. During his time in Oslo, he won Norway's Amateur Golf Championship. His final role in the RAF was at the Air Ministry, in a planning position. He retired from the military in January 1958.

== Later life ==
In his return to civilian life, Blake began working as a manager in a factory that produced car wax. After several months, he moved to Swansea to take up a position in a textile factory. This did not last long and he settled in Surrey, working for a company manufacturing electronics. Blake was an inveterate tinkerer and at his home in Surrey constructed a workshop to indulge his hobby. He soon developed a golfing aid, the 'Swingrite': this used a weighted member pivotally mounted to the shaft of a golf club and tensioned by a spring, and was designed to rotate at a certain point as the club was swung. The resulting change in weight distribution simulated the impact of a golf ball. The 'Swingrite' was patented in 1965 and was a commercial success, making Blake financially comfortable. He also published books on golfing technique and advocated a new style of golf swing. A few years later, he was granted a patent for a safety-belt mechanism for vehicles.

In 1979, Blake was a co-author, along with H. J. Weaver, of Suicide by Socialism; published by Springwood Books, this was an assessment of the decline of Britain's economic status in the post-war period and how it could be remedied. In The Bookseller, because of the issues raised, it was described as a "disturbing book".

Blake died in Surrey on 30 November 1981, and was survived by his wife and two children. He is credited with the destruction of thirteen aircraft, three of these being shared with other pilots. He also shared in the damaging of one aircraft. There is a memorial to him at a building at Purley Hospital, where he crashed his Hurricane in the early days of the Second World War. The memorial includes a description of the accident.
