= Ian Hogg (Royal Navy officer) =

Royal Navy Vice Admiral

Vice-Admiral Sir Ian Hogg KCB DSC*
- Born: Ian Leslie Trower Hogg; 30 May 1911; Camberley, Surrey, England
- Died: 2 March 2003 (aged 91)
- Military career
- Allegiance: United Kingdom
- Branch: Royal Navy
- Service years: 1929–1970
- Rank: Vice Admiral
- Commands: Vice-Chief of the Defence Staff; HMS Sluys
- Conflicts: Second World War
- Awards: Knight Commander of the Order of the Bath; Distinguished Service Cross & Bar

Vice-Admiral Sir Ian Leslie Trower Hogg KCB, DSC & Bar (30 May 1911 – 2 March 2003) was a Royal Navy officer whose service extended from the late 1920s through to the early 1970s. He received several medals for his service as a navigator during the Second World War. From 1967 to 1970 he served as Vice-Chief of the Defence Staff.

== Early life and career ==
Ian Leslie Trower Hogg, the son of an Indian Army colonel, was born in Camberley on 30 May 1911. His mother died at Dehra Dun two months after his birth. He was educated at Cheltenham College and joined the Navy in 1929 as a Special Entry – or ex-public school – cadet, earning a first-class certificate on graduation from the training ship HMS Erebus.

He subsequently served in the battleships HMS Barham and HMS Valiant and the cruiser HMS Effingham on the East Indies Station. His aptitude for navigation was shown early when a lieutenant in the destroyer HMS Acheron in the Mediterranean in 1934, and the dispatch vessel HMS Bideford in the Persian Gulf. His confidential reports during this period describe a capable leader, with a markedly beneficial influence over junior officers and the ship's company.

Qualifying as a specialist navigator in 1937, he was appointed to the cruiser HMS Southampton. His war started in the obsolete light cruiser HMS Cardiff on the arduous northern blockade patrol that deprived Germany of imports, and it continued briefly in the cruiser HMS Penelope where his "somewhat casual manner" was perceptively diagnosed as "liable to mislead". His war career showed that he was clearly able to differentiate the important from the unimportant and to "bear an even strain" under testing circumstances.

== Second World War ==
Hogg was awarded the first of his two Distinguished Service Crosses (DSC) for his efficiency and coolness as a navigator under the trying circumstances of the evacuation of Crete in May and June 1941. The Germans had intended to take Crete with combined airborne and seaborne attacks. Although the Royal Navy was able virtually to annihilate the seaborne component, which carried much equipment in local caïques, the German paratroops—though at great loss to themselves—forced the under-equipped British forces, many of whom were still in shock after being driven out of Greece, into another evacuation.

Air attacks by an almost unopposed and expert Fliegerkorps VIII around Crete cost the British three cruisers and six destroyers sunk, with an aircraft carrier, two battleships, five cruisers and seven destroyers badly damaged, bringing the Mediterranean Fleet almost to breaking point. The Commander-in-Chief, Admiral Sir Andrew Cunningham, was adamant that while ships were replaceable, the reputation of the Royal Navy was not, and that the evacuation of soldiers should continue to the limit. In the event 18,000 troops were rescued.

As the flotilla operations and navigating officer to Captain Stephen Arliss in the Royal Australian Navy destroyer Napier, Hogg was responsible on 28–29 May for organising hazardous feats of navigation on an unlit and badly charted coast near Sfakia in southwest Crete for his ship and the destroyers HMS Nizam, HMS Kelvin and HMS Kandahar. Only two motorboats and four unpowered whalers were available to embark 700 men and, at the same time, land 15,000 badly needed rations for those troops still fighting onshore.

The need to make best use of available darkness required the anchorage for this operation to be perilously close inshore. On 30 May, reduced to only two ships through damage and defects but using abandoned landing craft to supplement these, Napier and Nizam saved more than 1,400 troops. Hogg received praise for his cool, calm and cheerful demeanour and his very good advice when the force came under intensive air attack on 31 May, during which Napier was damaged in the engine room by a near miss.

Hogg stayed with the Napier as the senior staff officer to Captain Arliss, who became the commodore in command of Admiral Somerville's Eastern Fleet destroyers, based in Ceylon, until early 1944.

As the navigating and signals officer of the cruiser HMS Mauritius in August 1944, Hogg was awarded a Bar to his DSC for his outstanding zeal during prolonged and violent night actions against escorted enemy convoys close inshore near La Rochelle and the Ile d'Yeu. His captain remarked that Hogg was "cool, calm and collected and afforded advice that enabled us to take risks which with a less resolute and skilful officer would not have been justified".

Hogg was known as a good-looking man. It is recorded that during the war when Mauritius was refitting in Liverpool and a drink was difficult to come by, his companions would always "put Ian into bat first with the barmaid"—with invariably satisfactory results. In 1945 he married Mary Marsden within three months of having met her in Liverpool on a Monday and becoming engaged on the Saturday.

== Post-war service ==
After completing the staff course Hogg was appointed to the staff of the C-in-C Home Fleet from September 1945, the task of fleet navigator carrying the ancient title of Master of the Fleet. He was promoted to commander in 1947 and sent to Washington D.C. as staff officer (plans) in the British Joint Services Mission until 1949.

Command of the destroyer HMS Sluys (D60) followed, his ship being noted for her good spirit and efficient gunnery. He was then selected as staff officer (plans) and fleet navigating officer in the Mediterranean where Admiral the Earl Mountbatten of Burma appointed him as special assistant to the newly created Chief of NATO's Allied Staff. On his promotion to captain, Mountbatten wrote of him: 'He was doing a job originally intended for captain's rank and doing it brilliantly'.

After another staff tour in Washington and at the Admiralty, Hogg was appointed to Cyprus as the senior naval officer.

== Flag-rank assignments ==
Hogg was promoted to rear-admiral in 1962, and was Flag Officer, Medway and Admiral Superintendent Chatham Dockyard. He was appointed a Companion of the Order of the Bath in 1964.

As a vice admiral he was the Defence Services Secretary from 1966 to 1967, managing the relationship between the Ministry of Defence and the Royal Family and also maintaining the balance of appointments of senior officers to tri-service "defence department" posts—those posts which are rotated between the services. His final tour was as Vice-Chief of the Defence Staff during a difficult period of retrenchment in the defence sector. He was appointed a Knight Commander of the Order of the Bath and retired in 1970.

== Retirement and last years ==
From 1971 until 1974 Hogg was the Comptroller of the Royal Society of St George, an institution founded in 1894 with the object of promoting the English way of life.

He died on 2 March 2003, aged 91.

Military offices
Preceded by Sir Rodney Moore	Defence Services Secretary; 1966–1967	Succeeded by Sir Alan Boxer
Preceded by Sir George Cole	Vice-Chief of the Defence Staff; 1967–1970	Succeeded by Sir John Barraclough
