= No. 300 Group RAF =

Former Royal Air Force operations group

No. 300 (Transport) Group RAF
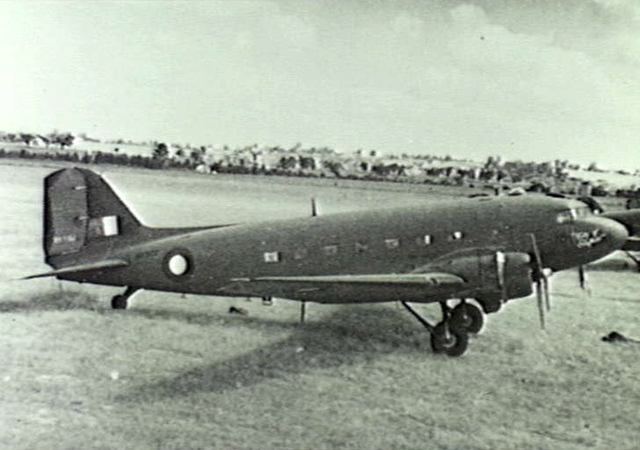
- A RAF Douglas Dakota at Camden Airport in 1945
- Active: 24 April 1945 – 17 April 1946
- Country: United Kingdom
- Branch: Royal Air Force
- Type: Royal Air Force group
- Role: Military transport
- Part of: RAF Transport Command

Commanders
- Notable commanders: Air Chief Marshal Sir Alfred Earle GBE, CB

No. 300 Group (300 Gp) was a Royal Air Force group of the Second World War. It was formed in Australia in late 1944 as No. 300 Wing with the role of providing air transport for the British Pacific Fleet (BPF), and was redesignated as a group in April 1945. It transported BPF supplies and personnel around Australia and to the fleet's forward bases in the Philippines and Manus Island. The group was disbanded in April 1946.

== History ==
During early stages of the planning to deploy the British Pacific Fleet, it was decided that it needed to be supported by a dedicated force of transport aircraft. These aircraft would give the fleet a means of rapidly transporting personnel, essential supplies and mail.

No. 300 Wing RAF was established at Mascot Airport in Sydney in November 1944. The wing (and later group) came under the control of the commander of the BPF, Admiral Sir Bruce Fraser. It was the only RAF unit to be directly assigned to a Royal Navy fleet commander during World War II.

In February 1945 No. 300 Wing comprised two flying units: No. 243 Squadron equipped with 30 Douglas Dakotas and No. 1315 Flight with 6 Consolidated B-24 Liberators. Two of the Liberators were fitted as VIP transports, and were used by Fraser and other senior officers. Many of No. 243 Squadron's personnel were Australians. While the wing's main base was at Camden Airport to the west of Sydney, its headquarters was located in the Melbourne suburb of South Yarra to liaise with the headquarters of the Royal Australian Air Force.

During early 1945 the wing established a regular service from Sydney to the BPF's forward base at Manus Island off the north coast of New Guinea; by March these flights operated daily. Regular services to the BPF's logistical hub at Leyte Gulf in the Philippines began in April 1945, and a route to Enewetak Atoll (a key base for BPF tankers) was added in July that year. Thrice-weekly services were flown to the United Kingdom via Auckland in New Zealand, San Diego in the United States and Montreal in Canada. A regular route was also established to Colombo in Ceylon. Parties of servicing personnel were established at each of these destinations and several staging points in Australia and New Guinea. Due to frequently adverse weather and under-developed airfields, the wing's aircrew found flights between Australia and the Pacific to be challenging.

During 1945, as additional personnel and aircraft arrived in Australia, No. 300 Wing was redesignated No. 300 Group. In June that year it was joined by No. 238 Squadron, which was transferred from Burma. The arrival of this unit took the number of Dakotas in the group to 70. This squadron was based at Parafield Airport in Adelaide. By August 1945 the group was conducting an efficient air transport service, which included evacuating wounded personnel. Two No. 300 Group Dakotas crashed into the ocean during the war, resulting in the deaths of both crews.

Following the end of the war, No. 300 Group extended its regular route from Sydney to the Philippines to Hong Kong, and was reinforced by a third flying squadron. The group subsequently opened routes to Singapore as well as Balikpapan and Labuan in Borneo, and Saigon in French Indochina. One of its roles was transporting Red Cross medical assistance to liberated prisoners of war. No. 238 and No. 243 Squadrons were disbanded in Australia on 27 December 1945 and 15 April 1946 respectively. Between its arrival in Australia and disbandment, No. 238 Squadron's aircraft were reported to have flown a total of 2.3 million miles and transported thousands of service personnel monthly without suffering any serious accidents. No. 300 Group was disbanded in April 1946; some of its aircraft were subsequently transferred to Hong Kong and Singapore.
