= MI14 =

Former department of the British Directorate of Military Intelligence

MI14, or British Military Intelligence, Section 14 was a department of the British Directorate of Military Intelligence. It was an intelligence agency of the War Office, which specialised in intelligence about Germany.

One of MI14's most valuable sources, codenamed Operation Columba, consisted of reports returned by pigeons dropped over Nazi-occupied countries in packs containing a miniature spying kit.

It was absorbed by the Secret Intelligence Service (MI6) after the Second World War.
