= Peter Horsley =

Royal Air Force Air Marshal (1921-2001)

Sir Peter Horsley
- Born: 25 March 1921
- Died: 20 December 2001 (aged 80); Salisbury, Wiltshire
- Military career
- Allegiance: United Kingdom
- Branch: Royal Air Force
- Service years: 1941–75
- Rank: Air Marshal
- Commands: No. 1 Group (1971–73); RAF Akrotiri (1962–66); RAF Wattisham (1959–62); No. 9 Squadron RAF (1957–58)
- Conflicts: Second World War
- Awards: Knight Commander of the Order of the Bath; Commander of the Order of the British Empire; Lieutenant of the Royal Victorian Order; Air Force Cross; Mentioned in Despatches; Croix de guerre (France)

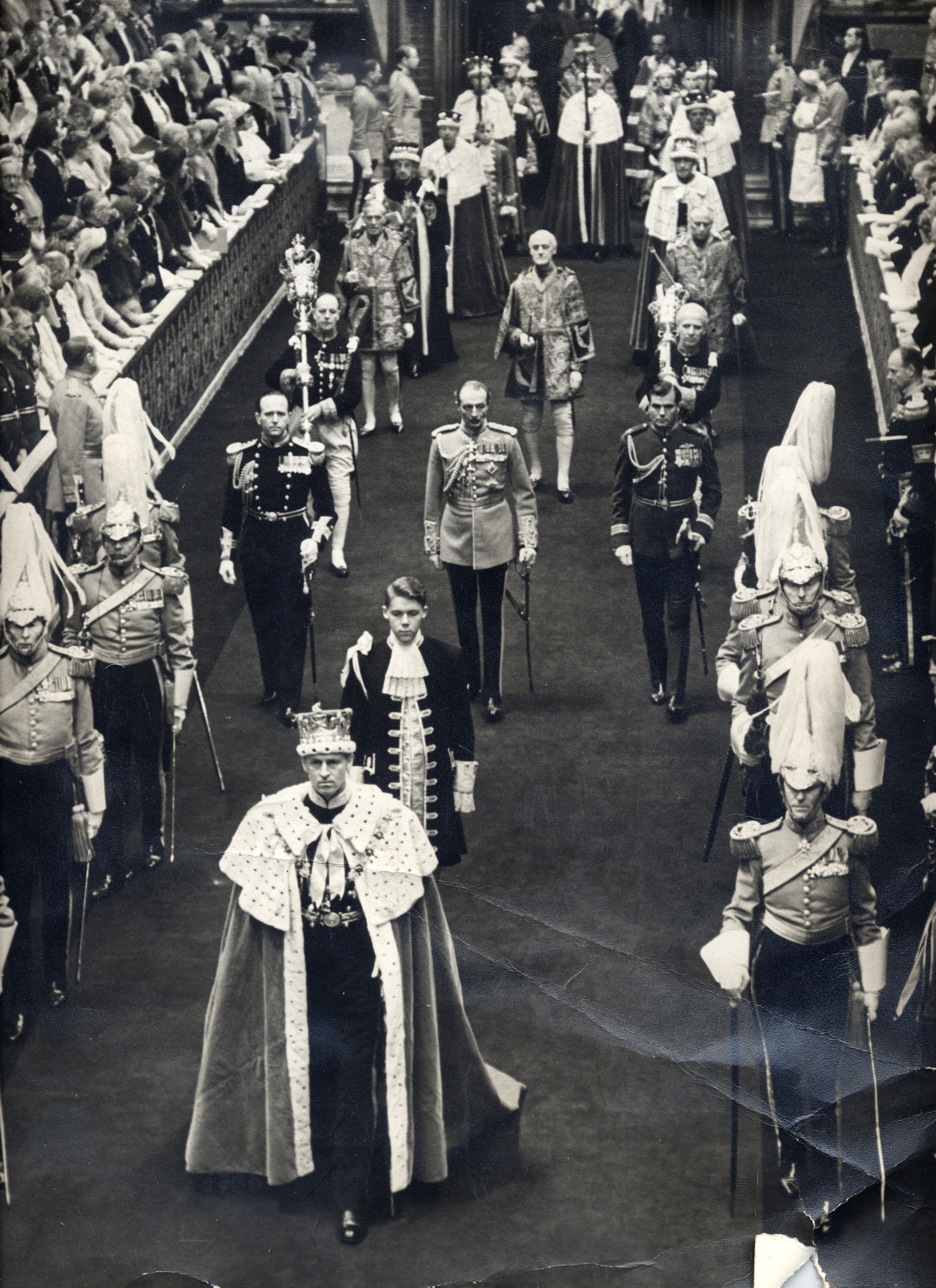
Horsley processing behind the Duke of Edinburgh at Queen Elizabeth II's Coronation in 1953 (on the right of the first group of three following the Duke)

Air Marshal Sir Beresford Peter Torrington Horsley, KCB, CBE, LVO, AFC (25 March 1921 – 20 December 2001) was a senior Royal Air Force commander.

== Early life ==
Horsley was the youngest of seven children of a West Hartlepool merchant who committed suicide in 1923 as a result of business worries. He was educated at the Dragon School, Oxford, and Wellington College.

== Military career ==
In 1939, he became a deck boy on the TSS Cyclops, a Blue Funnel Line steamer sailing to Malaya. He transferred to the homeward-bound TSS Menelaus when the Second World War was declared, but then deserted ship. As a member of the Merchant Navy Horsley would not have been able to join the RAF, which was his ambition.

Horsley served briefly in the Home Guard before joining the RAF, initially as an air gunner, as this was the only vacancy then available. However, he managed to get a transfer to pilot training, and was soon himself an instructor at RAF Cranwell.

He was transferred to the Flying Training School at Penfold, Alberta in 1942, and then to the Mosquito Conversion Unit at Greenwood, Nova Scotia, 1943–1944. He then joined 21 Squadron of 140 Wing, RAF Hunsdon, flying Mosquitoes on night fighter intruder missions over Nazi Germany. After D-Day he was shot down over the English Channel near Cherbourg and was picked up by an Air-Sea Rescue launch after three days. An account of the incident, read by Horsley himself, is kept in the Imperial War Museum archives. His navigator 'Bambi' was killed, and Horsley spent some time afterwards in hospital, and then the RAF rehabilitation centre at Loughborough.

Horsley then was attached to the communications squadron of the 2nd Tactical Air Force in France, and was personal pilot to Major-General Miles Graham during the Normandy invasion. He returned to the United Kingdom in 1947 and joined the staff of the Central Flying School, 23 Training Group. He received a permanent commission and was appointed adjutant to the Oxford University Air Squadron in 1948.

He joined the Royal Household in July 1949, as a Squadron Leader, as Extra Equerry to Princess Elizabeth, Duchess of Edinburgh and the Duke of Edinburgh. He was also concurrently Officer Commanding 29 Squadron, RAF Tangmere, Sussex, flying Meteor IX fighters. In 1952 he became a Wing Commander and Temporary Equerry to Elizabeth II, and in 1953 he became full-time as Equerry to the Duke of Edinburgh, relinquishing the second appointment in command of his squadron. He remained the Duke's Equerry until 1956.

In the late 1950s he became senior instructor at the RAF Flying College, Manby in Lincolnshire and was then made Station Commander at RAF Wattisham in Suffolk in 1959. He went on to be Group Captain Near East Air Force (NEAF) operations based in Cyprus in 1962.

Horsley attended the Imperial Defence College, and was then appointed Deputy Commandant at the Joint Warfare Establishment at Old Sarum in Wiltshire in 1966.

He became an Air Vice Marshal and was made Assistant Chief of Air Staff (Operations) in 1968, then Commanding Officer No. 1 Group in 1971. His last appointment in the RAF was as Deputy Commander-in-Chief RAF Strike Command in 1973 before he retired in 1975.

== Later life ==
Horsley had a number of business interests after retirement from the RAF: Robson Lowe (stamp auction house), chair; Stanley Gibbons, managing director. RCR International, director, beginning 1984; Horsley Holdings, director, beginning 1985; Yorkshire Sports, president, beginning 1986; National Printing Ink Co., chair, beginning 1987; Osprey Aviation Ltd., chair, beginning 1991. He wrote an autobiography, Sounds From Another Room (subtitled Memories of Planes, Princes and the Paranormal), published Leo Cooper in 1997, which described his interest in UFOs, which began when Equerry to His Royal Highness the Duke of Edinburgh, and a close encounter with an "alien" in London in 1954 . He died in 2001.

== Honours ==
Horsley received the French Croix de Guerre in 1944, and the Air Force Cross in 1945. He was made a Lieutenant of the Royal Victorian Order in 1956, and a Commander of the Order of the British Empire in 1964. In 1974 he was knighted and made a Knight Commander of the Order of the Bath.

Military offices
Preceded by Ruthven Wade	Air Officer Commanding No. 1 Group; 1971–1973	Succeeded by David Evans
Preceded by Sir Nigel Maynard	Deputy Commander-in-Chief Strike Command; 1973–1975	Succeeded by Sir Michael Beetham
