= Peter Terry =

Royal Air Force Air Chief Marshall (1926–2017)

Sir Peter Terry
- Born: 18 October 1926; Ramsgate, Kent, England
- Died: 19 December 2017 (aged 91); Aylesbury, United Kingdom
- Military career
- Allegiance: United Kingdom
- Branch: Royal Air Force
- Service years: 1946–1984
- Rank: Air Chief Marshal
- Commands: Deputy Supreme Allied Commander Europe (1981–84); RAF Germany (1979–81); Vice-Chief of the Air Staff (1977–79); RAF El Adem (1969–70)
- Awards: Knight Grand Cross of the Order of the Bath; Air Force Cross
- Other work: Governor of Gibraltar (1985–89)

Air Chief Marshal Sir Peter David George Terry, GCB, AFC (18 October 1926 – 19 December 2017) was a senior Royal Air Force commander who held a number of high-level British and NATO posts. Terry was Governor of Gibraltar from 1985 to 1989.

== Royal Air Force career ==
Terry joined the Royal Air Force in the ranks as an RAF Regiment aircraftman 2nd class on 17 July 1946. His potential for officer service was quickly recognised and Terry was commissioned as a pilot officer in the RAF Regiment on 29 May 1947. Spending the next nine years as a junior officer in the RAF Regiment, serving on Light Anti-Aircraft squadrons in RAF Germany and as Personal Staff Officer to the Commandant-General of the RAF Regiment. He transferred to the General Duties Branch in April 1956. During the later 1950s and 1960s, he worked his way up the officer ranks. As a group captain, Terry was station commander of RAF El Adem, Libya, from 1969 to 1970. He was there in September 1969 when Colonel Gaddafi overthrew King Idris of Libya in a coup. Terry oversaw withdrawal of British troops from El Adem and Tobruk in March 1970.

Terry was appointed the Assistant Chief of Staff in the Plans and Policy Division of the Supreme Headquarters Allied Powers Europe in 1975. On returning to the United Kingdom, he took up the post of Vice-Chief of the Air Staff on 25 March 1977. On 30 April 1979, Terry was appointed Commander-in-Chief of RAF Germany. Following promotion to air chief marshal, he was appointed Deputy Supreme Allied Commander Europe at SHAPE on 9 April 1981. Terry remained as Deputy SACEUR until 16 July 1984 and he retired from the RAF several months later.

== Governor of Gibraltar ==
Terry was Governor of Gibraltar from 19 November 1985 to December 1989. During his tenure as governor, Terry authorised the Special Air Service (SAS) to pursue Provisional IRA members as part of Operation Flavius, which the European Court of Human Rights would find had been in violation of Article 2 of the European Convention on Human Rights

== IRA shooting ==
On 18 September 1990 the Provisional Irish Republican Army attempted to kill Terry at his home in Main Road, Milford, Staffordshire. The attack took place at 9 pm, while Terry was sitting reading. The shooter(s) opened fire through a window, hitting him at least nine times. His wife, Betty, Lady Terry, was also shot and injured, near her eye. The couple's daughter, Liz, was found suffering from shock. Terry's face had to be rebuilt as the shots shattered his face and two high-velocity bullets lodged a fraction of an inch from his brain. The then prime minister, Margaret Thatcher, said that she "was utterly appalled and deeply grieved" by the shooting.

== Honours ==
In 1983 Terry was made as a Knight Grand Cross of the Order of the Bath. However, there was a long period before one of the 34 stalls set aside for the most senior knights fell vacant. Finally, in 2006, Terry was installed as a Knight Grand Cross of the Order of the Bath.

== Later life and death ==
In later life, Terry and his wife moved to Stoke Mandeville in Buckinghamshire. He was a strong supporter of his local church and also a keen golfer until his old leg wound began to give him trouble and restrict his mobility. Terry died on 19 December 2017, aged 91. He is survived by his wife, son and daughter.

Military offices
Preceded by Michael Beetham	Assistant Chief of Staff (Plans and Policy Division); Supreme Headquarters Allied Powers Europe; 1975–1977	Succeeded by Keith Williamson
Preceded by Sir David Evans	Vice-Chief of the Air Staff; 1977–1979	Succeeded by Sir John Nicholls
Preceded by Sir John Stacey	Commander-in-Chief RAF Germany; Also Commander of the Second Tactical Air Force; 1979–1981	Succeeded by Sir Thomas Kennedy
Preceded by Sir John Stacey	Deputy Commander-in-Chief Allied Forces Central Europe; 1981	Succeeded by Sir John Gingell
Preceded by Sir Jack Harman	Deputy Supreme Allied Commander Europe; With Günter Luther (to 1982), Günter Kießling (1982–84) and Hans-Joachim Mack (1984); 1981–1984	Succeeded by Sir Edward Burgess
Government offices
Preceded by Sir David Williams	Governor of Gibraltar; 1985–1989	Succeeded by Sir Derek Reffell
