= John Nicholls (RAF officer) =

Sir John Nicholls
- Born: 5 July 1926; Moreton, Cheshire
- Died: 17 May 2007 (aged 80)
- Military career
- Allegiance: United Kingdom
- Branch: Royal Air Force
- Service years: 1945–80
- Rank: Air Chief Marshal
- Commands: Vice-Chief of the Air Staff (1979–80); Air Member for Supply and Organisation (1977–78); RAF Leuchars (1967–70); Air Fighting Development Squadron (1962–64)
- Conflicts: Second World War; Korean War
- Awards: Knight Commander of the Order of the Bath; Commander of the Order of the British Empire; Distinguished Flying Cross; Air Force Cross; Distinguished Flying Cross (United States)

Air Marshal Sir John Moreton Nicholls, KCB, CBE, DFC, AFC (5 July 1926 – 17 May 2007) was a senior commander in the Royal Air Force. He had been a pilot at the end of the Second World War and also served with the United States Air Force in the Korean War.

== Early life ==
Nicholls was educated at the Liverpool Collegiate School and St Edmund Hall, Oxford.

== Career ==
Nicholls joined the Royal Air Force in June 1945 and served as a pilot during the later stages of the Second World War. During the Korean War he was seconded to the United States Air Force where he saw active service as a pilot and shot down a MiG 15. He was awarded both the British Distinguished Flying Cross and the US Distinguished Flying Cross for service in Korea. In 1959 he was seconded to English Electric to test fly the new supersonic Lightning. He was appointed Officer Commanding the Air Fighting Development Squadron in 1962, deputy director of Air Staff Briefing in 1965 and Station Commander at RAF Leuchars in 1967.

Nicholls went on to be Senior Air Staff Officer at Headquarters No. 11 Group in 1971, Personal Staff Officer to the Chief of the Defence Staff in November 1971 and Senior Air Staff Officer at Headquarters RAF Strike Command in 1973. He was then made Assistant Chief of the Air Staff (Operational Requirements) in 1976, Air Member for Supply and Organisation in 1977 and Vice Chief of the Air Staff in 1979 before retiring in 1980.

Nicholls was awarded the Air Force Cross in 1964. In the 1970 Birthday Honours he was appointed a Commander of the Order of the British Empire (CBE), and a Knight Commander of the Order of the Bath in the 1978 Birthday Honours.

== Family ==
In 1946, Nicholls married Enid Rose; they had two daughters. Following the death of his first wife, he married Sheelagh Hall in 1977.

Military offices
| Preceded by Sir Alasdair Steedman | Air Member for Supply and Organisation; 1977–1978 | Succeeded by Sir Rex Roe |
| Preceded by Sir Peter Terry | Vice-Chief of the Air Staff; 1979–1980 | Succeeded by Sir David Craig |
