= Governor Terry =

Governor Terry may refer to:

- Charles L. Terry Jr. (1900–1970), 65th Governor of Delaware.
- Peter Terry (1926–2017), Governor of Gibraltar from 1985 to 1989.
