= Vice Chief of the Air Staff =

The Vice Chief of the Air Staff is a senior assistant to the Chief of the Air Staff in several air forces. These include:

- Vice Chief of the Air Staff (India)
- Vice Chief of the Air Staff (Pakistan)
- Vice Chief of the Air Staff (United Kingdom)
