= John Curtiss (RAF officer) =

Royal Air Force Air Marshal (1924–2013)

Sir John Curtiss
- Born: 6 December 1924; England
- Died: 14 September 2013 (aged 88); Milford on Sea, England
- Military career
- Allegiance: United Kingdom
- Branch: Royal Air Force
- Service years: 1942–83
- Rank: Air Marshal
- Commands: No. 18 Group (1980–83); RAF Staff College, Bracknell (1977–80); RAF Bruggen (1970–72)
- Conflicts: Second World War; Cold War; Berlin Air Lift; Falklands War
- Awards: Knight Commander of the Order of the Bath; Knight Commander of the Order of the British Empire

Air Marshal Sir John Bagot Curtiss, KCB, KBE, FRAeS (6 December 1924 – 14 September 2013) was a senior Royal Air Force officer. He served in Bomber Command during the Second World War and was Air Commander of the British forces involved in the Falklands War. He was the first navigator to reach the three-star rank of air marshal.

== Early life ==
Curtiss was born on 6 December 1924 in England. His mother was a New Zealander and his father was Australian. His parents moved to England in 1914 after his father joined the Royal Flying Corps to fight in World War One. He was educated at Radley College, a public all-boys boarding school in Oxfordshire, England, and Wanganui Collegiate School, then an independent all-boys boarding school in Wanganui, New Zealand. In 1942, he attended a university short course at Worcester College, Oxford in preparation for joining the Royal Air Force.

== Military career ==
Curtiss was a member of the Oxford University Air Squadron from 1942 to 1943. He began pilot training in April 1943 and learnt to fly the Tiger Moth. He was commissioned into the Royal Air Force Volunteer Reserve on 27 October 1944 as a pilot officer on probation (emergency). He was given the service number 187025. Having been passed over during pilot selection, he became a navigator. From 1944 to 1945, he flew with Bomber Command. He joined No. 578 Squadron shortly after the Normandy landings and undertook attacks on retreating German forces. He also flew with No. 158 Squadron during this time.

After the war Curtis served with No. 5 Squadron and then No. 29 Squadron in Fighter Command before being appointed a Director at the RAF Staff College, Bracknell in 1967. After that he became Station Commander at RAF Bruggen, Group Captain, Operations at Headquarters Strike Command and then Senior Air Staff Officer at Headquarters No. 11 Group in 1974. His final postings were as Director-General, Organisation in 1975, Commandant of the RAF Staff College, Bracknell in 1977 and then Air Officer Commanding No. 18 Group in 1980 before becoming Air Component Commander during the Falklands War and then retiring in 1983.

== Later life ==
After retiring form the RAF, Curtiss maintained links with aviation and the military: he was director and chief executive of Society of British Aerospace Companies (SBAC) from 1984 to 1989, and secretary of the Defence Industries Council from 1985 to 1989. Through his work with the SBAC, he was involved in planning the Farnborough Air Show.

Curtiss died on 14 September 2013, aged 88, in Milford on Sea, Hampshire.

Military offices
Preceded by Sir Philip Lagesen	Air Officer Commanding No. 18 Group; 1980–1983	Succeeded by John Fitzpatrick
Preceded by Keith Williamson	Commandant of the RAF Staff College, Bracknell; 1977–1980	Succeeded by Michael Beavis
