= Denis Smallwood =

Royal Air Force Air Chief Marshal (1918-1997)

Air Chief Marshal Sir Denis Smallwood GBE KCB DSO DFC FRAeS FRSA
- Born: 13 August 1918
- Died: 26 July 1997 (aged 78)
- Military career
- Allegiance: United Kingdom
- Branch: Royal Air Force
- Service years: 1938–76
- Rank: Air chief marshal
- Commands: UK Air Forces (1975–76); Strike Command (1974–76); Near East Air Force (1969–70); No. 3 Group (1965–67); College of Air Warfare (1961–63); RAF North Coates (1959–61); RAF Biggin Hill (1953–55); No. 33 Squadron (1948–50); No. 87 Squadron (1941–42)
- Conflicts: Second World War
- Awards: Knight Grand Cross of the Order of the British Empire; Knight Commander of the Order of the Bath; Distinguished Service Order; Distinguished Flying Cross; Mentioned in dispatches

Air Chief Marshal Sir Denis Graham Smallwood, GBE, KCB, DSO, DFC, FRAeS, FRSA (13 August 1918 – 26 July 1997) was a senior Royal Air Force commander.

== RAF career ==
Educated at King Edward VI School in Birmingham, Smallwood joined the Royal Air Force in 1938.

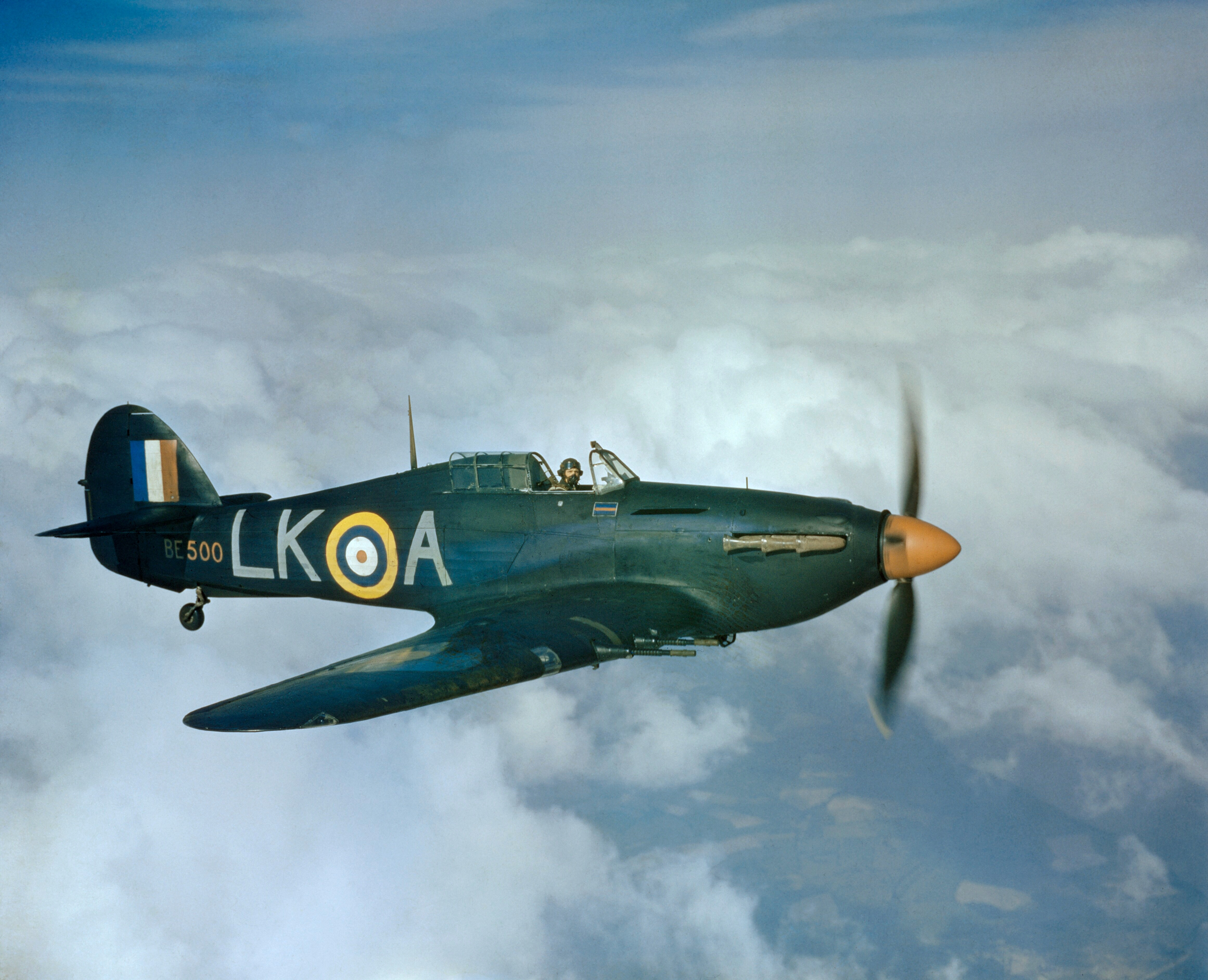
Wartime colour photo of Hurricane IIC BE500 flown by Sqn Ldr Denis Smallwood of 87 Sqn in overall RDM2 ("Special Night") scheme and used on intruder operations 1941–1942.

Smallwood took part in the Second World War and in November 1941 he was appointed Officer Commanding of No. 87 Squadron flying Hurricanes. In 1948 he became Officer Commanding No. 33 Squadron and in 1959 he joined the Directing Staff at the Joint Staff Services College before becoming Station Commander at RAF Biggin Hill in 1953. He became Group Captain, Plans for the Air Task Force in 1956 and then Officer Commanding RAF North Coates in 1959 before becoming Commandant of the College of Air Warfare in 1961. In 1963 he was made Assistant Chief of the Air Staff (Operations) and in 1965 he was appointed Air Officer Commanding No. 3 Group. He went on to be Senior Air Staff Officer at Headquarters, Bomber Command in 1967, Senior Air Staff Officer at Headquarters, Strike Command in 1968 and Air Officer Commanding-in-Chief, Near East Air Force (including responsibility for British Forces Cyprus and Administration of the Sovereign Base Areas) in 1969. Finally he was appointed Vice Chief of the Air Staff in 1970, Air Officer Commander-in-Chief Strike Command in 1974 and Commander-in-Chief, UK Air Forces in 1975 before retiring in 1976.

He lived at Princes Risborough in Buckinghamshire.

== Family ==
In 1940 he married Frances Jeanne Needham; they had one son and one daughter.

Military offices
Preceded by Sir Edward Gordon Jones	Commander-in-Chief Near East Air Force; Commander British Forces Cyprus; 1969–1970	Succeeded by Sir Derek Hodgkinson
Preceded by Sir Peter Fletcher	Vice-Chief of the Air Staff; 1970–1973	Succeeded by Sir Ruthven Wade
Preceded by Sir Andrew Humphrey	Commander-in-Chief Strike Command; 1974–1976	Succeeded by Sir Nigel Maynard
