= Nigel Maynard =

Royal Air Force Air Chief Marshal (1921-1998)

Sir Nigel Maynard
- Born: 28 August 1921
- Died: 18 June 1998 (aged 76)
- Military career
- Allegiance: United Kingdom
- Branch: Royal Air Force
- Service years: 1940–77
- Rank: Air chief marshal
- Commands: Strike Command (1976–77); RAF Germany (1973–76); Far East Air Force (1970–72); RAF Staff College, Bracknell (1968–70); RAF Changi (1960–62); No. 242 Squadron (1949–50)
- Conflicts: Second World War
- Awards: Knight Commander of the Order of the Bath; Commander of the Order of the British Empire; Distinguished Flying Cross; Air Force Cross

Air Chief Marshal Sir Nigel Martin Maynard, KCB, CBE, DFC, AFC (28 August 1921 – 18 June 1998) was a senior Royal Air Force commander.

== RAF career ==
Born the son of Air Vice Marshal Forster Maynard and educated at Aldenham School, Maynard entered the RAF College Cranwell early in 1940 but due to the demands of war his training was cut short and he was posted to No. 210 Squadron flying Sunderlands in June 1940. In 1949 he was appointed Officer Commanding No. 242 Squadron and then, following various staff appointments, he was made Station Commander at RAF Changi in 1960. He went on to be Group Captain, Operations at Headquarters Transport Command in 1962, Director of Defence Plans (Air) at the Ministry of Defence in 1964 and Director of Defence Plans in 1966. He was made Commandant of the RAF Staff College, Bracknell, in 1968 before being appointed Air Officer Commanding-in-Chief, Far East Air Force in 1970. In 1972 he was made Chief of Staff at Strike Command, in 1973 he took up the post of Commander-in-Chief, RAF Germany and in 1976 he became Air Officer Commanding-in-Chief, Strike Command. He retired at his own request on 21 May 1977.

== Family ==
In 1946 he married Daphnie Llewellyn; they had one son and one daughter.

Military offices
Preceded by Deryck Stapleton	Commandant of the RAF Staff College, Bracknell; 1968–1970	Succeeded by Michael Beetham
Preceded by Sir Neil Wheeler	Commander-in-Chief Far East Air Force; 1970–1972	Succeeded by Force disbanded
New title Command established	Deputy Commander-in-Chief Strike Command; 1972–1973	Succeeded by Sir Peter Horsley
Preceded by Sir Harold Martin	Commander-in-Chief RAF Germany; Also Commander of the Second Tactical Air Force; 1973–1976	Succeeded by Sir Michael Beetham
Preceded by Sir Denis Smallwood	Commander-in-Chief Strike Command; 1976–1977	Succeeded by Sir David Evans
