= Alfred Ball =

Royal Air Force Air Marshal (1921-2012)

Sir Alfred Ball
- Born: 18 January 1921
- Died: 25 January 2012 (aged 91)
- Military career
- Allegiance: United Kingdom
- Branch: Royal Air Force
- Service years: 1937–79
- Rank: Air Marshal
- Commands: RAF Honington (1963–64); No. 13 Squadron (1946); No. 540 Squadron (1944–45); No. 542 Squadron (1944); No. 682 Squadron (1943); No. 4 Photographic Reconnaissance Unit (1942–43)
- Conflicts: Second World War
- Awards: Knight Commander of the Order of the Bath; Distinguished Service Order; Distinguished Flying Cross; Mentioned in Despatches (2); Air Medal (United States)

Air Marshal Sir Alfred Henry Wynne Ball, KCB, DSO, DFC (18 January 1921 – 25 January 2012) was a Royal Air Force officer who became Deputy Commander of Strike Command.

== RAF career ==
Educated at Campbell College in Belfast, Ball joined the Royal Air Force in 1937. He served in the Second World War flying Spitfires and commanding No. 682 Squadron, No. 542 Squadron, No. 540 Squadron and finally No. 13 Squadron, he was mentioned in despatches twice. He was appointed Chief of Staff at Supreme Headquarters Allied Powers Europe in 1968, Director General of RAF Organisation in 1971 and UK Military Representative to the Central Treaty Organization at Ankara in 1975. He went on to be Deputy Commander of Strike Command in 1977 before retiring in 1979.

In retirement he became an advisor to International Computers Limited. He died on 25 January 2012.

== Family ==
In 1942 he married Nan McDonald; they have three sons and one daughter.

Military offices
Preceded by Sir Alan Davies	Deputy Commander-in-Chief Strike Command; 1977–1978	Succeeded by Sir Robert Freer
