= Peter Harding (RAF officer, born 1933) =

Marshal of the Royal Air Force (1933–2021)

Marshal of the Royal Air Force Sir Peter Harding GCB
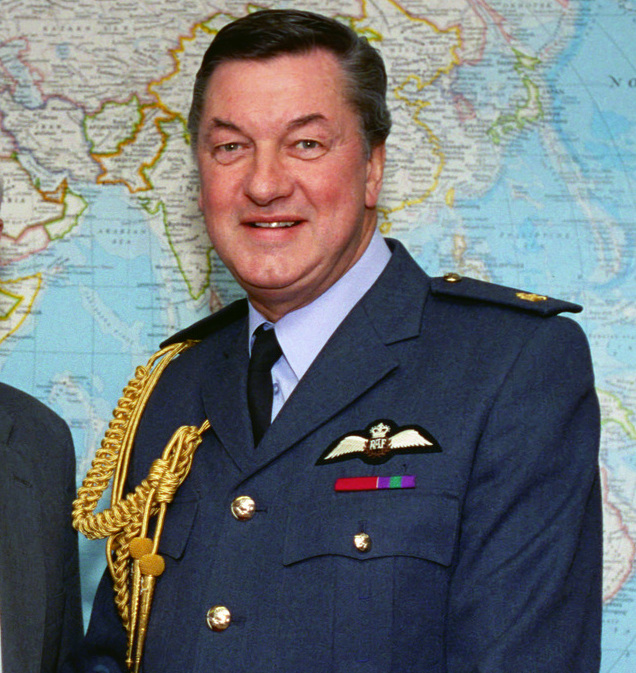
- Harding in 1993
- Born: 2 December 1933; Lambeth, London, England
- Died: 19 August 2021 (aged 87)
- Military career
- Allegiance: United Kingdom
- Branch: Royal Air Force
- Service years: 1952–1994
- Rank: Marshal of the Royal Air Force
- Commands: Chief of the Defence Staff (1992–94); Chief of the Air Staff (1988–92); RAF Strike Command (1985–88); No. 11 Group (1981–82); RAF Bruggen (1974–76); No. 18 Squadron (1966–69)
- Conflicts: Gulf War
- Awards: Knight Grand Cross of the Order of the Bath

Marshal of the Royal Air Force Sir Peter Robin Harding, GCB (2 December 1933 – 19 August 2021) was a Royal Air Force officer who served as a bomber pilot in the 1950s, a helicopter squadron commander in the 1960s and a station commander in the 1970s. He became Chief of the Air Staff in 1988 and served in that role during the Gulf War in 1991. He became Chief of the Defence Staff in December 1992 but resigned after his affair with Lady (Bienvenida) Buck, the wife of Conservative MP Antony Buck, became public.

== Early life and education ==
Harding was born on 2 December 1933 in Lambeth, London, to Elizabeth (née Clear) and Peter Harding. He was educated at Chingford High School.

== RAF career ==
Harding was commissioned into the Royal Air Force as an acting pilot officer on national service on 3 September 1952 and given a permanent commission in the same rank on 15 October 1952. He was promoted to the substantive rank of pilot officer on 12 August 1953 and posted to No. 12 Squadron flying Canberra bombers in 1954.

Promoted to flying officer on 10 September 1954, Harding became a qualified flying instructor and flight commander at the Royal Air Force College Cranwell in 1957, before being promoted to flight lieutenant on 10 March 1958. In 1960, he was sent to Australia to serve as a pilot with No. 1 Squadron RAAF flying Canberra bombers again. He attended RAF Staff College in 1963 and was promoted to squadron leader on 1 July 1963.

In 1964, he started a tour in the Air Secretary's department at the Ministry of Defence. He became Officer Commanding No. 18 Squadron at RAF Gütersloh and then RAF Acklington in 1966, flying the Westland Wessex helicopter and then, having been promoted to wing commander on 1 July 1968, he joined the Defence Policy Staff at the Ministry of Defence in 1970.

After attending the National Defence College at Latimer in 1969, Harding became Director of Air Staff Briefing in 1971. Promoted to group captain on 1 July 1972, he became Station Commander at RAF Bruggen in July 1974. He was appointed aide-de-camp to The Queen on 1 January 1975. Promoted to air commodore on 1 January 1976, he was then made Director of Defence Policy at the Ministry of Defence in 1976 and Assistant Chief of Staff (Plans and Policy) at SHAPE on 18 July 1978. He was promoted to air vice-marshal on 1 January 1979 and appointed a Companion of the Order of the Bath in the 1980 Birthday Honours.

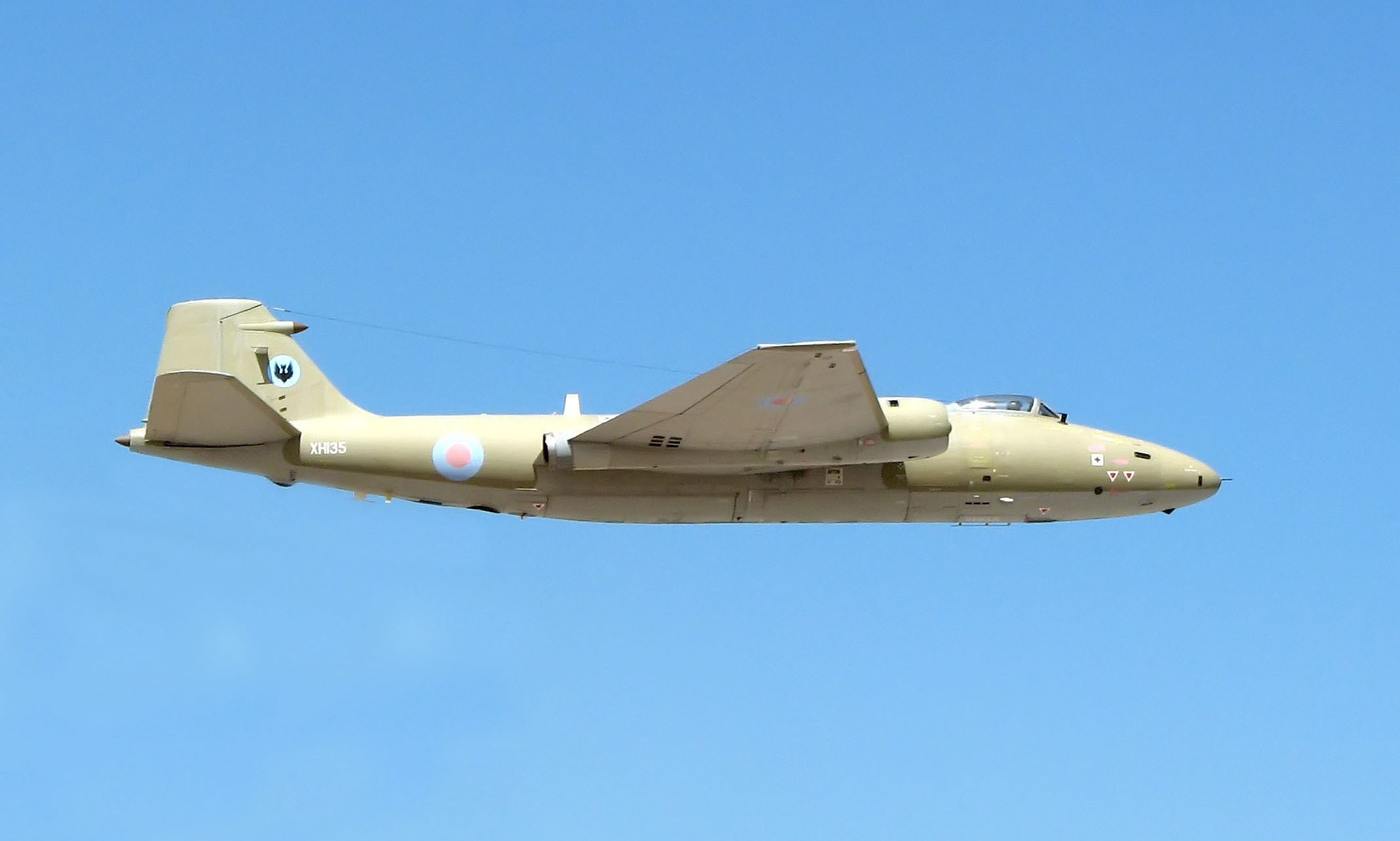
Canberra, a type flown by Harding in the UK and Australia

Harding became Air Officer Commanding No.11 Group on 7 January 1981, and Vice-Chief of the Air Staff with the acting rank of air marshal on 28 August 1982. He was advanced to Knight Commander of the Order of the Bath in the 1983 New Year Honours. Promoted to air chief marshal on 1 January 1985, he became Vice Chief of the Defence Staff early that year. Appointed Air Officer Commanding Strike Command on 29 August 1985, he was advanced to Knight Grand Cross of the Order of the Bath in the 1988 New Year Honours. He was made Air Aide-de-Camp to The Queen on 14 November 1988 and became Chief of the Air Staff on the same day. As Chief of the Air Staff he advised the British Government on the deployment of air power during the Gulf War.

Promoted to Marshal of the Royal Air Force on 6 November 1992, Harding became Chief of the Defence Staff on 31 December 1992 but he resigned in March 1994 after it was revealed by Max Clifford and the News of the World that, aged 58, he had had an affair with the 32-year-old Bienvenida Pérez, the Spanish wife of Conservative MP Antony Buck.

In addition to security concerns, and although Harding was a serving officer rather than a politician, the story was embarrassing to the government as it coincided with a string of "Back to Basics" scandals. Unlike other Marshals of the Royal Air Force who only relinquished their appointments, Harding resigned his commission on 14 June 1994 and consequently ceased to be listed in the Air Force List; however, he was subsequently returned to the list.

== Later career ==
After leaving the RAF, Harding was deputy chairman of GEC-Marconi from 1995 to 1998. He was also chairman and chief executive of Merlyn International Associates from 1997 to 2006 and chairman of Thorlock International from 1999 to 2000.

He became a vice-patron of the United Kingdom National Defence Association.

He was awarded an honorary Doctor of Science from Cranfield University in 1990.

== Personal life ==
In 1955, Harding married Sheila Rosemary May; they had three sons and one daughter.

Harding died on 19 August 2021.

Military offices
Preceded by David Harcourt-Smith	Station Commander RAF Bruggen; 1974–1976	Succeeded by John Walker
Preceded by Peter Latham	Air Officer Commanding No. 11 Group; 1981–1982	Succeeded by Kenneth Hayr
Preceded by Sir David Craig	Vice-Chief of the Air Staff; 1982–1985	Post disbanded
Preceded by Sir Peter Herbert	Vice-Chief of the Defence Staff; January–August 1985	Succeeded by Sir Patrick Hine
Preceded by Sir David Craig	Commander-in-Chief Strike Command; 1985–1988	Succeeded by Sir Patrick Hine
Preceded by Sir David Craig	Chief of the Air Staff; 1988–1992	Succeeded by Sir Michael Graydon
Preceded by Sir Richard Vincent	Chief of the Defence Staff; 1992–1994	Succeeded by Sir Peter Inge
