= F. H. Maynard =

Royal Air Force Air Vice-Marshal (1893-1976)

Forster Herbert Martin Maynard CB AFC
- Maynard in 1942
- Born: 1 May 1893; Waiuku, New Zealand
- Died: 26 January 1976 (aged 82)
- Relatives: Air Chief Marshal Nigel Maynard (son)
- Military career
- Allegiance: United Kingdom
- Branch: Royal Navy (1914–1918); Royal Air Force (1918–1945)
- Service years: 1914–1945
- Rank: Air Vice Marshal
- Nickname: Sammy
- Units: No. 1 Squadron RNAS
- Commands: No. 19 (Reconnaissance) Group (1944–1945); RAF Mediterranean (1940–1941); University of London Air Squadron (1935–1937); No. 12 Squadron (1929–1930)
- Conflicts: First World War; Second World War
- Awards: Companion of the Order of the Bath; Air Force Cross; Mentioned in Despatches (4); Commander of the Legion of Merit (United States)

Air Vice Marshal Forster Herbert Martin "Sammy" Maynard (1 May 1893 – 26 January 1976) was a senior commander in the Royal Air Force and a flying ace credited with six aerial victories during the First World War. He also served as the Air Officer Commanding Malta during the early part of the Second World War.

His son, Nigel Maynard, also became an air marshal in the RAF.

== Early life ==
He was born in New Zealand to a Church of England clergyman. The family returned to England two years later and he was educated at St John's School, Leatherhead, and University College London.

== World War I ==
Maynard joined the Royal Naval Division in 1914 as an engineer. He transferred to the Royal Naval Air Service the following year. After training, he became an instructor until 1916.

In January 1917, he was posted to No. 1 Squadron RNAS on the Western Front. While there, flying a Sopwith Triplane, he ran up a string of six victories from 29 April through 1 June 1917, becoming considered as a flying ace. His final tally included an enemy fighter set afire, another one destroyed in conjunction with a couple of squadron mates, and four enemy planes driven down out of control, including one shared with Cyril Ridley and six other pilots.

In September 1917, he was transferred to the aircraft depot at Dunkirk. After his return to England, he was injured in a crash. After recovery, he became officer commanding of a training depot. He subsequently received the Air Force Cross for his work in training.

== Inter war ==
Between the wars he attended the Imperial Defence College. He was posted to HQ Iraq Command and served administrative positions for the Air Staff.

== World War II ==
When Italy declared war in June 1940, a part of the very limited strength of the fighter squadron based at Malta were four Gloster Sea Gladiators, which were found in crates marked "Boxed Spares – Property of the Royal Navy" (these having been left by HMS Glorious in April). Maynard obtained permission to assemble them, and three of these units, later named "Faith", "Hope", and "Charity", were part of the initially limited defence during the Siege of Malta.

On 1 June 1941, Maynard was replaced as Malta's Air Officer Commanding by Air Commodore Hugh Lloyd. After he was replaced on Malta, he was AOA, HQ RAF Coastal Command. In 1944 he was AOC of No. 19 (Reconnaissance) Group.

In the postwar period, Maynard was appointed a commander in the United States' Legion of Merit.

== Magna Carta ==
At the end of 1945 Maynard sold an extraordinarily rare and lost original Magna Carta at auction to a London bookseller who paid £42 for the document, and sold it to Harvard Law School for $27 believing it to be a copy. Its estimated value can be ascertained by the fact that a 1297 Magna Carta that sold at auction in New York in 2007 and fetched $21m.

== Notes ==
Military offices
Preceded by Robert Leckie	Air Officer Commanding RAF Mediterranean; 1940–1941	Succeeded by Hugh Lloyd
