= John Stacey =

Royal Air Force Air Chief Marshal (1924-1981)

Sir John Stacey
- Born: 1 December 1924
- Died: 1 January 1981 (aged 56)
- Military career
- Allegiance: United Kingdom
- Branch: Royal Air Force
- Service years: 1942–81
- Rank: Air Chief Marshal
- Commands: RAF Germany (1977–79); Second Tactical Air Force (1977–79); RAF Akrotiri (1969–72); RAF Coltishall (1969); No. 50 Squadron (1963–65); No. 54 Squadron (1956–59)
- Awards: Knight Commander of the Order of the Bath; Commander of the Order of the British Empire

Air Chief Marshal Sir William John Stacey, KCB, CBE, FRAeS (1 December 1924 – 1 January 1981) was a senior commander in the Royal Air Force in the 1970s and until his sudden death from pancreatic cancer in 1981.

== RAF career ==
Educated in Ireland and South Africa, Stacey joined the Royal Air Force in 1942 during the Second World War and after pilot training in South Africa served as a fighter pilot in Burma with No. 155 Squadron and then No. 60 Squadron.

After the war he served as a pilot with No. 54 Squadron and then with No. 72 Squadron. He was appointed Officer Commanding No. 54 Squadron in 1956, Chief of the Nuclear Operations Branch at Headquarters Second Tactical Air Force in 1959 and Officer Commanding No. 50 Squadron flying Vulcan B.1A bombers in 1963.

He was made deputy director of Operations for Bombers & Reconnaissance in 1965 and then Station Commander first at RAF Coltishall and then at RAF Akrotiri in 1969. He went on to be Chief of Staff at Headquarters No. 46 Group in 1972, Assistant Chief of the Air Staff (Policy) in 1974 and Deputy Commander-in-Chief at RAF Strike Command in 1976. Finally he became Commander-in-Chief, RAF Germany in 1977 and Deputy Commander-in-Chief at Allied Air Forces Central Europe before his death in 1981.

He lived at Winchester in Hampshire.

Military offices
Preceded by Sir Michael Beetham	Deputy Commander-in-Chief Strike Command; 1976–1977	Succeeded by Sir Alan Davies
Preceded by Sir Michael Beetham	Commander-in-Chief RAF Germany; Also Commander of the Second Tactical Air Force; 1977–1979	Succeeded by Sir Peter Terry
Preceded by Sir Peter Le Cheminant	Deputy Commander-in-Chief Allied Forces Central Europe; 1979–1981	Succeeded by Sir Peter Terry
