= Peter Fletcher (RAF officer) =

Royal Air Force Air Chief Marshal (1916-1999)

Sir Peter Fletcher
- Born: 7 October 1916; Durban, South Africa
- Died: 2 January 1999 (aged 82); London, England
- Military career
- Allegiance: United Kingdom
- Branch: Royal Air Force
- Service years: 1939–73
- Rank: Air Chief Marshal
- Commands: Controller Aircraft (1970–73); Vice-Chief of the Air Staff (1967–70); No. 38 Group (1966–67); RAF Abingdon (1958–60); RAF Belvedere (1942–44); No. 258 Squadron (1942)
- Conflicts: Second World War
- Awards: Knight Commander of the Order of the Bath; Officer of the Order of the British Empire; Distinguished Flying Cross; Air Force Cross

Air Chief Marshal Sir Peter Carteret Fletcher, KCB, OBE, DFC, AFC, FRAeS (7 October 1916 – 2 January 1999) was a senior Royal Air Force officer who served as Vice-Chief of the Air Staff from 1967 to 1970.

== RAF career ==
Educated at St George's College and Rhodes University in South Africa, Fletcher joined the Royal Rhodesian Air Force in 1939 and then transferred to the Royal Air Force. He served in the Second World War as officer commanding No. 258 Squadron and as station commander at RAF Belvedere in Southern Rhodesia before joining the Directing Staff RAF Staff College (Overseas) in Haifa. After the war he joined the Directing Staff at the Joint Services Staff College and then became a member of the Joint Planning Staff at the Air Ministry. He was appointed air attaché in Oslo in 1953, a member of the Directing Staff at the Imperial Defence College in 1956 and station commander at RAF Abingdon in 1958. He went on to be deputy director of the Joint Planning Staff in 1960, director of Operational Requirements in 1961 and assistant chief of the Air Staff (Policy) in 1964. His last appointments were as air officer commanding No. 38 Group in 1966, vice-chief of the air staff in 1967 and controller of aircraft in 1970 before retiring in 1973.

In retirement he was a director of Hawker Siddeley, director of corporate strategy and planning at British Aerospace and then a member of the Airbus Industry Supervisory Board.

== Family ==
In 1940 he married Marjorie Kotze; they had two daughters.

Military offices
Preceded by Sir Christopher Hartley	Controller of Aircraft; 1970–1973	Succeeded by Sir Neil Wheeler
Preceded by Sir Brian Burnett	Vice-Chief of the Air Staff; 1967–1970	Succeeded by Sir Denis Smallwood
Preceded by Leslie Mavor	Air Officer Commanding No. 38 Group; 1966–1967	Succeeded by Harold Martin
