= David Craig, Baron Craig of Radley =

British air marshal (born 1929)

Marshal of the Royal Air Force The Right Honourable The Lord Craig of Radley GCB OBE
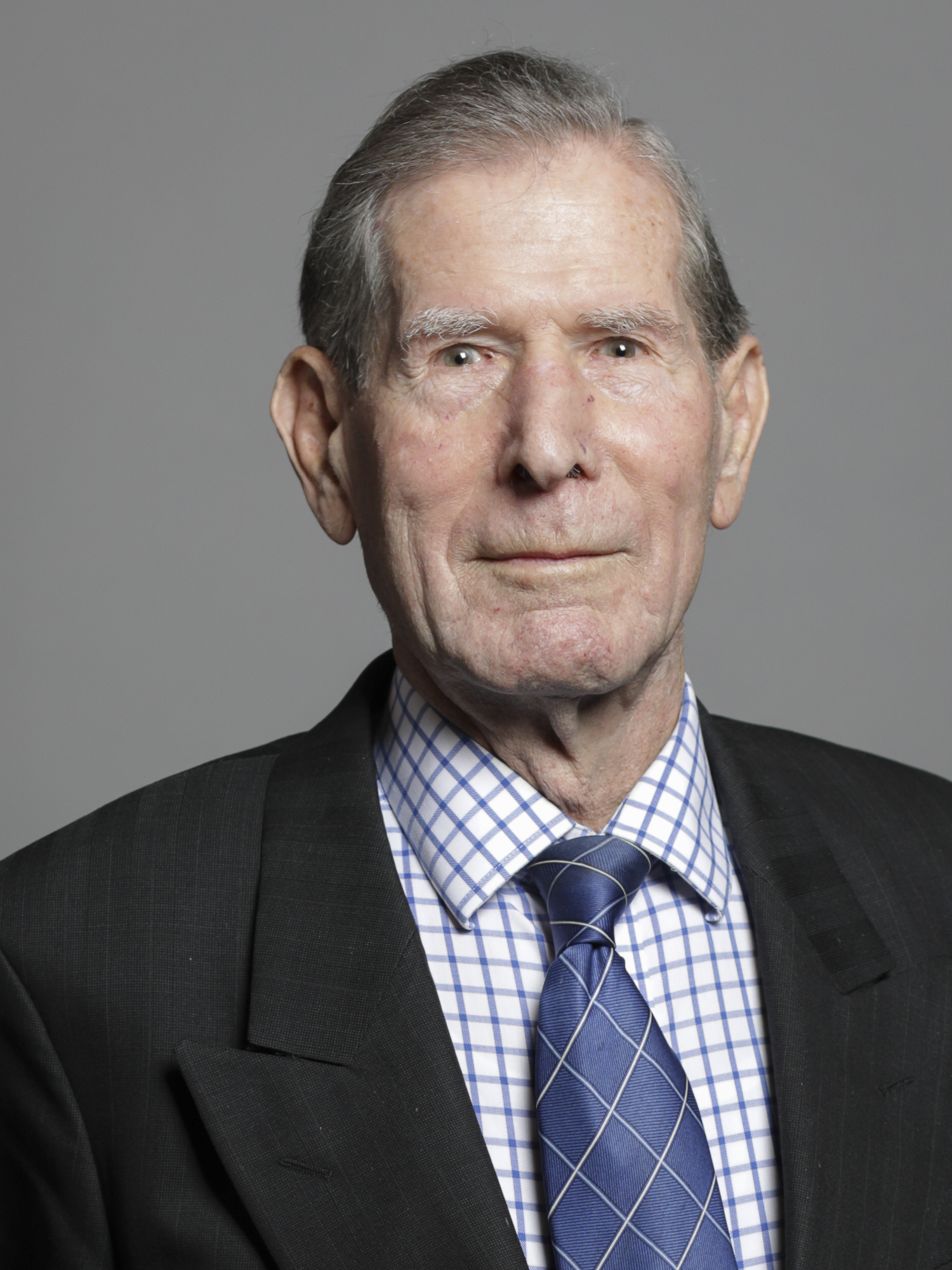
- Official portrait, 2020
- Born: 17 September 1929 (age 97); Dublin, Ireland
- Military career
- Allegiance: United Kingdom
- Branch: Royal Air Force
- Service years: 1951–1991
- Rank: Marshal of the Royal Air Force
- Commands: Chief of the Defence Staff (1988–91); Chief of the Air Staff (1985–88); RAF Strike Command (1982–85); No. 1 Group (1978–80); RAF Akrotiri (1972–74); RAF Cranwell (1968–70); No. 35 Squadron (1963–65)
- Conflicts: Gulf War
- Awards: Knight Grand Cross of the Order of the Bath; Officer of the Order of the British Empire; Queen's Commendation for Valuable Service in the Air
- Other work: Convenor of the Crossbench Peers

Member of the House of Lords
- Lord Temporal
- Life peerage 30 July 1991

Personal details
- Party: Crossbencher

Marshal of the Royal Air Force David Brownrigg Craig, Baron Craig of Radley, GCB, OBE (born 17 September 1929) is a retired Royal Air Force officer and member of the House of Lords. He was a fast jet pilot in the 1950s, a squadron commander in the 1960s and a station commander in the 1970s. He served as Chief of the Air Staff during the late 1980s, when the Boeing Airborne early warning and control system was ordered and the European Fighter programme was being developed. He then served as Chief of the Defence Staff during the Gulf War. He was granted a life peerage as Baron Craig of Radley after his retirement from active service in 1991, sitting as a crossbencher. As of 2026, he is the oldest serving British parliamentarian and the last living officer in the British Armed Forces to have held a five-star rank whilst on active service. (Note: Since 1997, all appointments to five-star ranks in the British Armed Forces have only been honorary.)

== Early life ==
The son of Major Francis Brownrigg Craig and his wife Olive Craig, Craig grew up in the Irish Free State, and was largely unaffected by the events of the Second World War. In 1943 he came to Britain and started at Radley College where, in addition to his studies, he rowed, captained the school's first team at rugby and later became Head of School. He gained a place at Lincoln College, Oxford, where he graduated with a degree in mathematics, and joined the Oxford University Air Squadron.

== RAF career ==
Craig was commissioned as a pilot officer on 19 September 1951 (with seniority from 19 December 1949). He was initially put through the pilot's course at No. 7 Flying Training School at RAF Cottesmore where he was promoted to flying officer on 19 March 1952 before earning his "wings" in April 1952. He went on to the Advanced Flying School at RAF Driffield where he was promoted to flight lieutenant on 19 December 1952 and then to 209 Advanced Flying School at RAF Weston Zoyland where he was a jet conversion instructor. In 1955 he joined No. 247 squadron at RAF Odiham which was converting from Meteors to Hunters. After attending the guided weapons course at the RAF Technical College at Henlow, he was posted to a missile evaluation site at North Coates. He was promoted to squadron leader on 1 January 1959 and posted to the Air Ministry later that year. He attended RAF Staff College in 1961 before joining No. 35 Squadron at RAF Coningsby in January 1963 initially as a flight commander and then as Officer Commanding the Squadron flying Vulcan B2 aircraft.

Promoted to wing commander on 1 January 1964, Craig was appointed Military Assistant to the then Chief of the Defence Staff, Field Marshal Sir Richard Hull in June 1965. He was awarded the Queen's Commendation for Valuable Service in the Air in the 1965 Birthday Honours.

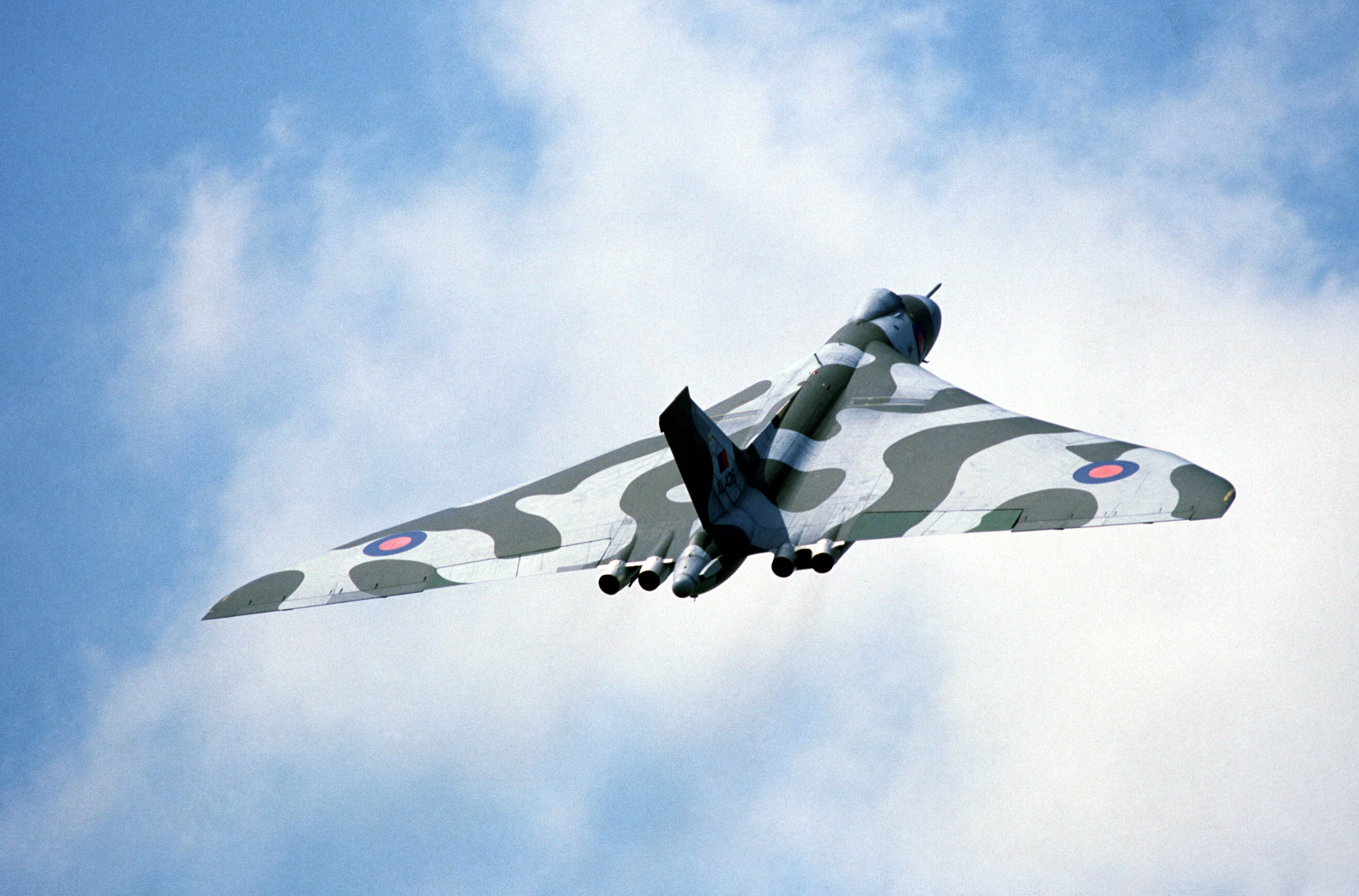
Vulcan B2, a type flown by Craig in the early 1960s

Craig was appointed an Officer of the Order of the British Empire in the 1967 Birthday Honours and, having been promoted to group captain on 1 January 1968, he became Station Commander at RAF Cranwell later that year. He became Aide-de-Camp to the Queen in 1969. He was made Director (Plans and Operations) and Headquarters Far East Command in 1970, and having been promoted to air commodore on 1 January 1972, he became Station Commander at RAF Akrotiri in Cyprus later that year. He attended the Royal College of Defence Studies in 1974. Promoted to air vice-marshal on 1 January 1975, he became Assistant Chief of Air Staff (Operations) on 25 March 1975.

Appointed a Companion of the Order of the Bath in the 1978 Birthday Honours, Craig became Air Officer Commanding No. 1 Group later that year. He went on to be Vice-Chief of the Air Staff in 1980 and advanced to Knight Commander of the Order of the Bath in the 1981 New Year Honours. He was promoted to air marshal on 1 January 1981, and appointed to the post of Commander-in-Chief RAF Strike Command on 20 September 1982 with the acting rank of air chief marshal on 21 September 1982. He was promoted to the substantive rank of air chief marshal on 1 July 1983 and advanced to Knight Grand Cross of the Order of the Bath in the 1984 Birthday Honours.

Craig became Chief of the Air Staff on 15 October 1985 and appointed Air Aide-de-Camp to the Queen on the same date. As Chief of the Air Staff he advised the British Government on the ordering of the Boeing Airborne early warning and control system and the development of the European Fighter programme. Having been promoted to the rank of Marshal of the Royal Air Force on 14 November 1988, he became Chief of the Defence Staff on 9 December 1988. As Chief of the Defence Staff he advised the British Government on the deployment of 45,000 servicemen and women during the Gulf War. He retired from service in 1991.

== Later work ==
On 30 July 1991, following his retirement from the RAF, Craig was made a life peer as Baron Craig of Radley, of Helhoughton in the County of Norfolk. In retirement he was a Director of ML Holdings plc from 1991 to 1992. He was the Convenor of the Crossbench Peers in the House of Lords from December 1999 until July 2004 and Chairman of the Council of King Edward VII's Hospital from 1998 to 2004. He was awarded an honorary DSc. from Cranfield University in 1988.

== Personal life ==
Craig married Elisabeth June Derenburg in 1955; they have two children. His interests include fishing and shooting.

== Arms ==
Coat of arms of David Craig, Baron Craig of Radley
Crest Riding from an astral crown or a knight on horseback in full armour, his dexter hand holding a broken tilting spear, all proper, his helm surmounted by three ostrich plumes gules, argent and sable. Escutcheon Ermine, an arrow in bend gules feathered or, the point upwards proper, transfixing a mullet vert, over all on a chevron sable three delta figures argent. Supporters On either side a double-headed eagle wings displayed per pale gules and azure, beaked and legged or, that to the dexter charged on the breast with two keys in saltire wards upwards also gold and that to the sinister charged on the breast with a rose argent barbed and seeded proper; a compartment comprising a grassy mount traversed palewise by a runway both proper bordered by four crosses formy gules. Motto Nec Degenero

== Sources ==
- Probert, Henry (1991). High Commanders of the Royal Air Force. HMSO. ISBN 0-11-772635-4.

Military offices
Preceded by Basil Primavesl	Station Commander RAF Cranwell; 1968–1970	Succeeded by Gerald Pendred
Preceded by Philip Lagesen	Air Officer Commanding No. 1 Group; 1978–1980	Succeeded by Michael Knight
Preceded by Sir John Nicholls	Vice-Chief of the Air Staff; 1980–1982	Succeeded by Sir Peter Harding
Preceded by Sir Keith Williamson	Commander-in-Chief RAF Strike Command; 1982–1985	Succeeded by Sir Peter Harding
Preceded by Sir Keith Williamson	Chief of the Air Staff; 1985–1988	Succeeded by Sir Peter Harding
Preceded by Sir John Fieldhouse	Chief of the Defence Staff; 1988–1991	Succeeded by Sir Richard Vincent
Parliament of the United Kingdom
Preceded by The Lord Weatherill	Convenor of the Crossbench Peers; 1999–2004	Succeeded by The Lord Williamson
Orders of precedence in the United Kingdom
Preceded by The Lord Hollick	Gentlemen; Baron Craig of Radley	Followed by The Lord Rogers of Quarry Bank
