= Alan Davies (RAF officer) =

Royal Air Force Air Marshal (1924-1998)

Sir Alan Davies
- Born: 31 March 1924
- Died: 27 January 1998 (aged 73)
- Military career
- Allegiance: United Kingdom
- Branch: Royal Air Force
- Service years: 1941–84
- Rank: Air Marshal
- Commands: RAF Stradishall (1967–69); No. 201 Squadron (1959–62); Air Sea Warfare Development Unit (1958–59)
- Conflicts: Second World War
- Awards: Knight Commander of the Order of the Bath; Commander of the Order of the British Empire; Queen's Commendation for Valuable Service in the Air (2)

Air Marshal Sir Alan Cyril Davies, KCB, CBE (31 March 1924 – 27 January 1998) was a Royal Air Force officer who served as Deputy Commander of RAF Strike Command in 1977.

== RAF career ==
Davies joined the Royal Air Force (RAF) in 1941 during the Second World War: he served in Coastal Command, and was commissioned in 1943.

After the war he was involved in the introduction of the Avro Shackleton as a maritime reconnaissance aircraft. He was given command of the Joint Anti-Submarine School Flight in 1952 and the Air Sea Warfare Development Unit in 1958, where he was involved in the development of the Hawker Siddeley Nimrod, and then commanded No. 201 Squadron in 1959. He went on to be deputy director of Operational Requirements at the Ministry of Defence in 1964, Station Commander of RAF Stradishall in 1967 and Director of Air Plans at the Ministry of Defence in 1969.

Davies then became Assistant Chief of the Air Staff in 1972, Deputy Chief of Staff at Headquarters Allied Air Forces Central Europe in 1974 and Deputy Commander of RAF Strike Command in 1977. His final appointments were as Director of the International Military Staff at NATO in Brussels in 1978, Head of the RAF Support Area Economy Review Team in 1981 and Co-ordinator for Anglo-American Relations in 1984. He retired in 1984.

In retirement he became Chairman of the Corps of Commissionaires.

== Family ==
In 1949 he married Julia Elisabeth Ghislaine Russell, who was born in Belgium; they had three sons (one of whom died).

Military offices
| Preceded by Sir John Stacey | Deputy Commander-in-Chief Strike Command; 1977 | Succeeded by Sir Alfred Ball |
