= Charles Medhurst =

Sir Charles Medhurst
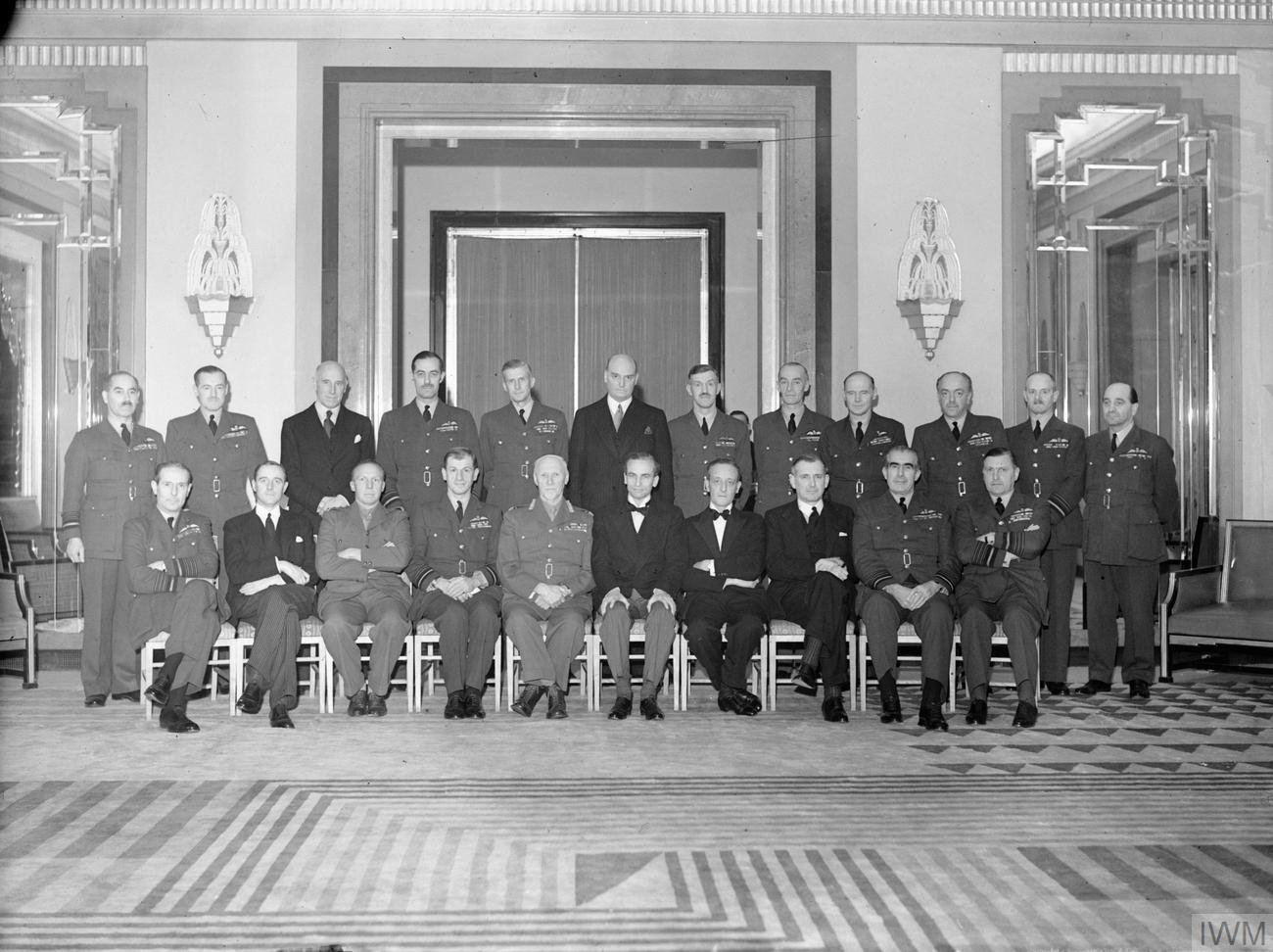
- Air Vice Marshal Medhurst, standing far right, as Vice Chief of the Air Staff with the Air Council
- Born: 12 December 1896; Kings Norton, England
- Died: 18 October 1954 (aged 57); New Forest, England
- Military career
- Allegiance: United Kingdom
- Branch: British Army (1915–18); Royal Air Force (1918–50)
- Service years: 1915–1950
- Rank: Air Chief Marshal
- Commands: Mediterranean and Middle East Command (1945–48); Middle East Command (1945); RAF Staff College (1943–45); Vice-Chief of the Air Staff (1942–43); No. 4 Squadron (1930–31); No. 111 Squadron (1919–20); No. 14 Squadron (1917–19)
- Conflicts: First World War; Second World War
- Awards: Knight Commander of the Order of the Bath; Officer of the Order of the British Empire; Military Cross; Mentioned in Despatches (2); Commander's Cross with Star of the Order of Polonia Restituta (Poland); Commander of the Legion of Merit (United States); Order of the White Lion, Second Class (Czechoslovakia); Grand Commander of the Order of George I (Greece); Commander of the Order of Leopold (Belgium)

Air Chief Marshal Sir Charles Edward Hastings Medhurst, KCB, OBE, MC (12 December 1896 – 18 October 1954) was a First World War Royal Flying Corps pilot on the Western Front and later a senior officer in the Royal Air Force.

== RAF career ==
After education at St Peter's School, York, Medhurst was awarded Royal Aero Club pilot certificate No. 1437 on 13 July 1913. He was commissioned into The Royal Inniskilling Fusiliers on 16 June 1915 and in a few months was training to be a pilot with the Royal Flying Corps. He was soon operational on the Western Front flying the Nieuport Scout with No. 13 Squadron. In 1917 he became the officer commanding No. 14 Squadron operating in Palestine. On 1 August 1919 he was awarded a permanent commission as a captain in the Royal Air Force and by 1925 had attended the RAF Staff College. He became Officer Commanding No. 4 Squadron in 1930 and he joined the Directing Staff at the RAF Staff College in 1931 before becoming deputy director of Intelligence at the Air Ministry in 1935. He then went to Rome as Air Attaché in 1937.

Medhurst held a number of staff appointments during the Second World War including RAF Secretary of the Supreme War Council from 1940, Director of Allied Air Co-Operation and then Director of Plans all during 1940. He became Assistant Chief of the Air Staff (Intelligence) in 1941 and after a spell as Temporary Vice-Chief of the Air Staff later in 1942 he became Assistant Chief of the Air Staff (Policy) in February 1943. In March 1943 he was appointed commandant of the RAF Staff College later moving on in February 1945 to be Air Officer in Command of RAF Middle East Command.

After the war Medhurst was made Air Officer Commanding-in-Chief, RAF Mediterranean and Middle East Command (which had absorbed his previous command when it was disbanded in August 1945). His last appointment was as Chairman of the British Joint Services Mission to Washington, D.C. in the rank of air chief marshal. Medhurst retired on 19 April 1950 and he died a few years later aged 58 on 18 October 1954.

== Family ==
Medhurst married Christabell Guy in 1919 in York. His son Pilot Officer R. E. H. "Dickie" Medhurst was killed on 19 September 1944 when the Douglas Dakota Mk. III he was co-piloting exploded after taking Anti-Aircraft Artillery fire during an air drop mission during Operation Market Garden. His daughter Rozanne was an Italian speaker and code breaker at Bletchley Park, the Government Code and Cipher School.

Military offices
New command	Assistant Chief of the Air Staff (Intelligence); 1941–1942	Succeeded by Frank Inglis
Preceded by Sir Wilfrid Freeman	Vice-Chief of the Air Staff (acting); 1942–1943	Succeeded by Sir Douglas Evill
Preceded by Sir Keith Park	Air Officer Commanding-in-Chief Middle East Command; February – August 1945	Disbanded
Preceded by Sir Guy Garrod	Commander-in-Chief RAF Mediterranean and Middle East; 1945–1948	Succeeded by Sir William Dickson
Preceded by Lord Wilson	Chief of the British Joint Staff Mission to Washington; 1948–1950	Succeeded by Lord Tedder
