= Douglas Evill =

Royal Air Force air marshal

Air Chief Marshal Sir Douglas Claude Strathern Evill GBE KCB DSC AFC DL
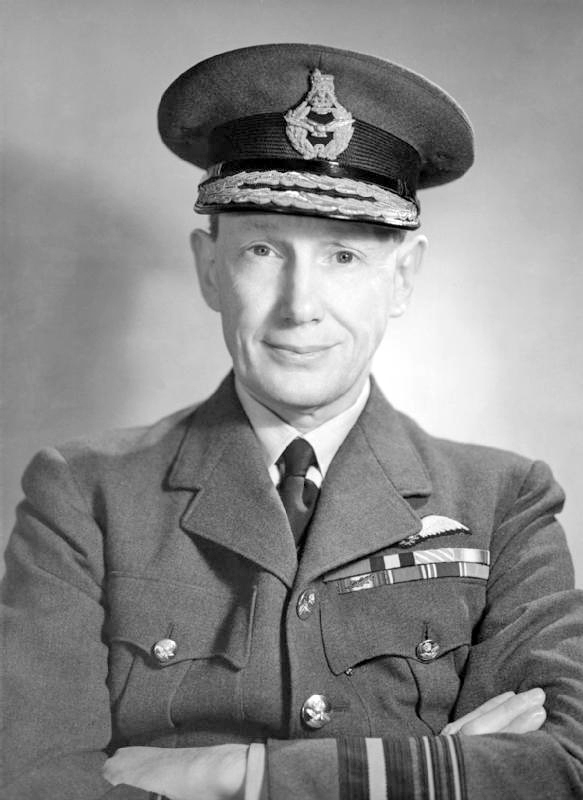
- Air Marshal Sir Douglas Evill c. 1943
- Born: 8 October 1892; Broken Hill, New South Wales, Australia
- Died: 22 March 1971 (aged 78); Winchester, Hampshire, England
- Military career
- Allegiance: United Kingdom
- Branch: Royal Navy (1910–18); Royal Air Force (1918–47)
- Service years: 1910–1947
- Rank: Air Chief Marshal
- Commands: Vice-Chief of the Air Staff (1943–46); No. 70 Squadron RAF (1923–25); No. 202 Squadron RNAS (1916–17)
- Conflicts: First World War; Second World War
- Awards: Knight Grand Cross of the Order of the British Empire; Knight Commander of the Order of the Bath; Distinguished Service Cross; Air Force Cross; Mentioned in Despatches (3); Knight of the Legion of Honour (France); Commander's Cross with Star of the Order of Polonia Restituta (Poland); Commander of the Legion of Merit (United States); Military Order of the White Lion, First Class (Czechoslovakia)
- Other work: Deputy Lieutenant of Hampshire

Air Chief Marshal Sir Douglas Claude Strathern Evill, GBE, KCB, DSC, AFC, DL (8 October 1892 – 22 March 1971) was an Australian-born British Royal Naval Air Service pilot and squadron commander during the First World War. Serving in the Royal Air Force between the wars, he was a senior air commander during the Second World War.

== Early life ==
Douglas Evill was born on 8 October 1892 in Broken Hill, New South Wales, Australia, to English parents who had settled in Australia shortly before his birth. After receiving a private education in England, Evill studied as a cadet at the Royal Naval College, Osborne, on the Isle of Wight, before attending the Britannia Royal Naval College in Devon.

== Naval service and the First World War ==
Evill was a cousin of the pioneer aviator Arthur Longmore who encouraged him to take up flying. After taking private flying lessons at Hendon, Evill gained his Aero Club Aviator's Certificate (No. 512) on 13 June 1913, only three months after gaining his naval commission as a sub-lieutenant. Evill then applied to join the Naval Wing of the Royal Flying Corps but was not accepted and he spent some time serving on destroyers. Evill was promoted to full lieutenant on 15 August 1914 and was appointed an acting flight lieutenant on 4 December 1914 on securing a transfer to the Royal Naval Air Service which by 1914 had gained its independence from the Royal Flying Corps.

Evill spent much of the First World War on operational flying duties over the Western Front, flying out of Dunkirk from February 1915 onwards. Probably around the summer of 1915 he took up duties on No. 1 Squadron RNAS which was based in Dunkirk. On 22 June 1916 Evill was awarded the Distinguished Service Cross. The citation read as follows:

In recognition of his services as a pilot at Dunkirk since February, 1915. In addition to his work as a pilot, Flight Commander Evill has shown great zeal and ability in carrying out experiments connected with signalling and spotting.

On 5 November 1916 Evill was appointed the Officer Commanding No. 2 Squadron RNAS which like No. 1 Squadron was engaged in flying duties on the Western Front. Less than two months later, on the last day of 1916, Evill was promoted to the RNAS rank of squadron commander.

The summer of 1917 saw Evill back in England in a training role. On 30 July 1917 he became the first commander of the RNAS's Naval Seaplane Training School at Lee-on-the-Solent. The work in establishing the unit involved requisitioning 30 acres (120,000 m^{2}) of land and several coastal properties. Evill also had to contend with temporary hangarage for his seaplanes and the safe operation of a crane which lowered his aircraft from the top of the cliff on to rails which ran into the sea. On 1 April 1918, when the RNAS was merged with the Royal Flying Corps, Evill was regraded from squadron commander to major in the new Royal Air Force.

== Between the wars ==
Evill remained in the fledgling RAF after the war and in 1919 he was placed in command of flying boat units, granted a permanent commission in the RAF in the rank of squadron leader and awarded the Air Force Cross. On 20 February 1920, he was appointed to the staff of the School of Naval Co-operation and Aerial Navigation and later that year on 8 October he married Henrietta Hortense, the daughter of Sir Alexander Drake Kleinwort (the first of the Kleinwort Baronets).

Evill spent much of 1921 at the British Army's Staff College at Camberley. On 1 January 1922 Evill was posted to the headquarters of Coastal Area working on the technical aspects of aircraft carriers.

Late 1923 saw Evill return to operational duties. From September to October he probably completed a refresher flying course at No. 4 Flying Training School. On 12 October he was appointed Officer Commanding No. 70 Squadron, flying Vernons from the Hinaidi Cantonment in Baghdad, Iraq.

With promotion to wing commander and following his return to Great Britain in early 1925, Evill was appointed to the Directing Staff of the RAF Staff College in May. After nearly four years of instructing, Evill was posted to the RAF College, Cranwell as the Assistant Commandant where he remained until he was succeeded by Philip Babington in late 1931.

After departing Cranwell, Evill was promoted to group captain in the new year. After a period of illness and time as a supernumerary which occupied most of 1932, Evill attended the Imperial Defence College in 1933.

In the five years leading up to the Second World War Evill held a number of air officer staff and administrative appointments. In April 1934, he was sent to the Air Ministry and served as Deputy Director of War Organization. He was promoted to air commodore on the last day of 1935; this promotion may have coincided with his elevation to Director of War Organization. Evill left the Air Ministry in September 1936 for Headquarters Bomber Command where he served as the Senior Air Staff Officer. In January 1937, whilst on the staff of Bomber Command, Evill accompanied Air Vice Marshal Christopher Courtney (the RAF's Director of Operations and Intelligence) as a member of the RAF mission to Germany on a tour of inspection of the Luftwaffe. On 1 January 1938 Evill was promoted to air vice marshal, three months later he was appointed Air Officer in charge of Administration at Bomber Command.

In the spring of 1939, during the debate concerning airfield deception, Evill argued for the construction of fake aerodromes designed to deceive the enemy. He was in favour of the creation of dummies of all satellite airfields which would be designed to mislead during day and night raids. He also favoured the building of decoy airfields for primary large-scale bases but only to the extent that they would be effective against night operations. Despite some disagreement from other senior RAF commanders, Evill's view was adopted as policy in June.

Just before the outbreak of the Second World War, Evill briefly served as the British air deputy on the Anglo-French Supreme War Council.

== Second World War ==
Following the start of the Second World War, Evill was moved from Bomber to Fighter Command as the Senior Air Staff Officer (SASO) at its Headquarters, serving under Air Chief Marshal Hugh Dowding. In February 1940 Evill was appointed the Senior Air Staff Officer at the Headquarters of the Royal Air Force in France under Air Marshal Sir Arthur Barratt. When British Air Forces France in France dissolved in defeat in June 1940, Evill returned to Fighter Command, once again serving as SASO. He continued at Fighter Command from the Battle of Britain, to The Blitz and the fighter operations of 1941.

In February 1942, Evill departed Great Britain for the United States as the head of the RAF delegation to Washington. By March 1943, Evill had returned to Great Britain where he was appointed Vice-Chief of the Air Staff. Evill continued as VCAS throughout the rest of the war, receiving promotion to air marshal at the beginning of 1944.

On 1 February 1945, Evill sent a memorandum to the Chiefs of Staff Committee outlining the Air Staff's support for the area bombing of eastern German cities. He noted that the ensuing chaos would hamper Wehrmacht reinforcements which were moving up to meet the Russian advance. Evill wrote

Evacuees from German and German-Occupied Provinces to the east of Berlin are streaming westward through Berlin itself and through Leipzig, Dresden, and other cities in the East of Germany. The administrative problems involved in receiving the refugees and re-distributing them are likely to be immense. The strain on the administration and upon the communications must be considerably increased by the need for handling military reinforcements on their way to the Eastern Front. A series of heavy attacks by day and night ...is likely to create considerable delays in the deployment of troops at the Front, and may well result in establishing a state of chaos in some or all of these centres.

Less than two weeks later, the Bombing of Dresden began. Evill stepped down as VCAS on 1 June 1946; the following January he retired from the RAF, receiving promotion to air chief marshal just a few days before he left the Service.

== Later years ==
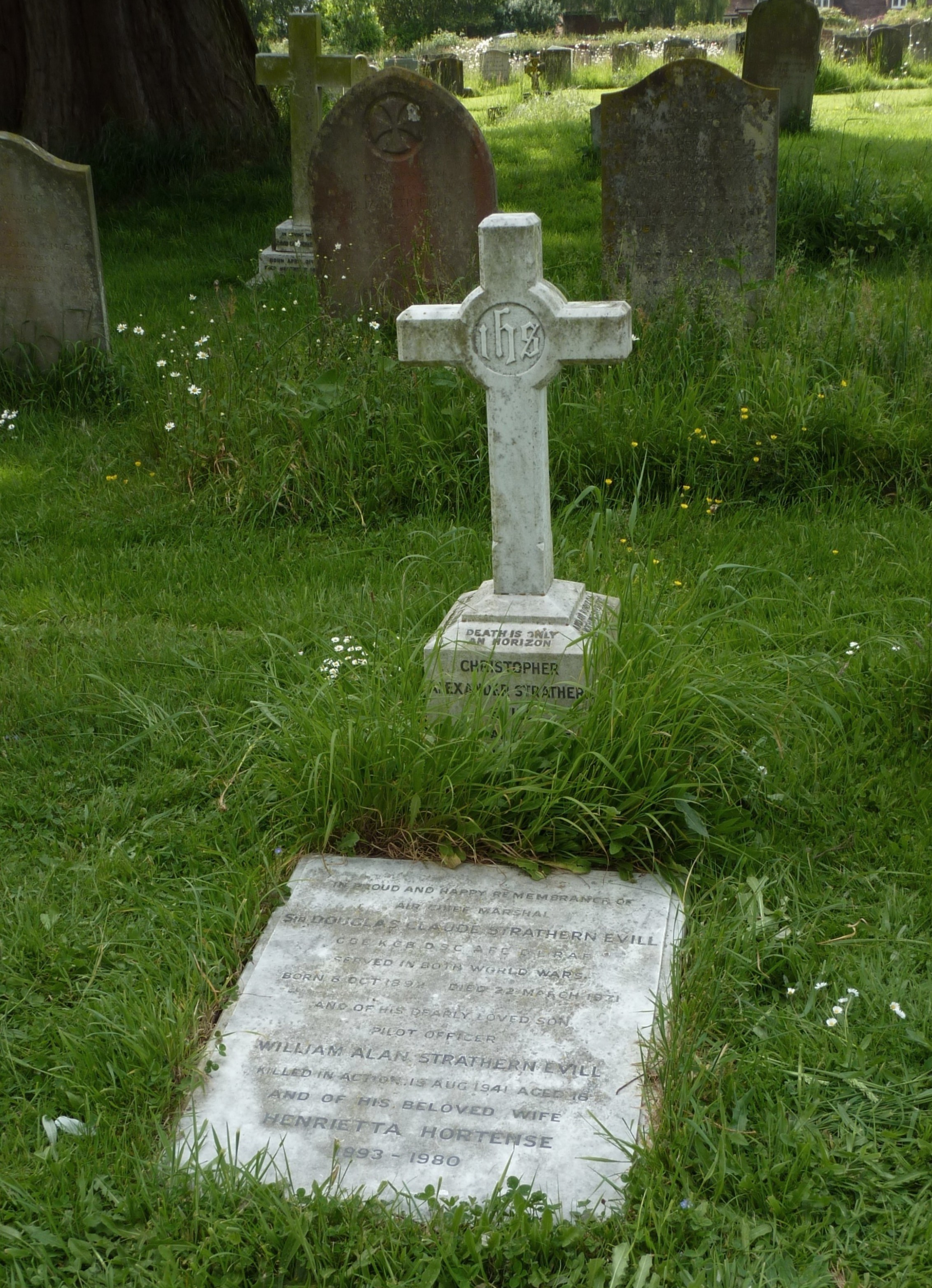
Douglas Evill's grave at the Holy Trinity Church, Cuckfield, Sussex, photographed in 2014

As a retired officer, Evill stayed active in Service and civil matters. He was a member of the council for King Edward VII's Hospital for Officers and served as the Director-General of the English Speaking Union from 1947 to 1949. In late 1960 Evill was appointed Honorary Air Commodore of No. 3617 (County of Hampshire) Fighter Control Unit in the Royal Auxiliary Air Force.

Evill was portrayed by Sir Michael Redgrave in the film Battle of Britain (1969).

Towards the end of his life, Evill suffered with severe arthritis; he died at his home in Winchester on 22 March 1971, aged 78.

Military offices
Unknown	Assistant Commandant of the RAF College, Cranwell; 1929–1931	Succeeded by Philip Babington
Preceded by Arthur Harris	Head of the RAF Delegation to the USA; 1942–1943	Succeeded by Sir William Welsh
Preceded by Charles Medhurst (acting)	Vice-Chief of the Air Staff; 1943–1946	Succeeded by Sir William Dickson
