= David Evans (RAF officer) =

Royal Air Force Air Chief Marshal (1924–2020)

Air Chief Marshal Sir David Evans GCB CBE
- Born: 14 July 1924; Windsor, Ontario, Canada
- Died: 21 February 2020 (aged 95)
- Military career
- Allegiance: United Kingdom
- Branch: Royal Air Force
- Service years: 1944–83
- Rank: Air Chief Marshal
- Nickname: Paddy
- Commands: Vice-Chief of the Defence Staff (1981–83); Strike Command (1977–80); Vice-Chief of the Air Staff (1976–77); No. 1 Group (1973–75)
- Conflicts: Second World War
- Awards: Knight Grand Cross of the Order of the Bath; Commander of the Order of the British Empire; Queen's Commendation for Valuable Service in the Air

Air Chief Marshal Sir David George Evans, GCB, CBE (14 July 1924 – 21 February 2020) was a Canadian-British Royal Air Force officer.

== Career ==
Born and educated in Canada, Evans was commissioned into the Royal Air Force as a pilot officer under an emergency commission on 7 April 1944 during the Second World War. He underwent pilot training in Canada and he then completed operational training in Ismaïlia in Egypt. On 7 October 1944, he was promoted to flying officer (war substantive). Evans was one of the first RAF officers to enter Bergen-Belsen concentration camp.

He was promoted to flight lieutenant (war substantive) on 7 April 1946. His promotion to flying officer was confirmed on 30 September 1947 with seniority from 7 April 1946. Evans was promoted to the substantive rank of flight lieutenant on 29 October 1948, with promotions to squadron leader on 1 October 1954, to wing commander on 1 July 1959 and to group captain on 1 July 1964.

He piloted the British bobsleigh team at the 1964 Olympics.

In 1973 Evans was made Air Officer Commanding No. 1 Group, in 1976 he was appointed Vice Chief of the Air Staff and he went on to be Air Officer Commanding-in-Chief RAF Strike Command the following year. He was Vice-Chief of the Defence Staff from 1981 to 1983.

== Later life ==
In retirement, Evans became a Non-Executive Director of British Aerospace. He retained his Canadian citizenship and made many visits there. He was an honorary citizen of Winnipeg, Canada, Shreveport-Bossier City, United States, and the town of Dunnville, Ontario. He died on 21 February 2020.

== Awards and decorations ==
On 9 June 1955, Squadron Leader Evans was awarded the Queen's Commendation for Valuable Service in the Air.

In 1985 he was made King of Arms of the Order of the Bath.

Military offices
Preceded by Sir Patrick Howard-Dobson	Vice-Chief of the Defence Staff; 1981–1983	Succeeded by Sir Peter Herbert
Preceded by Sir Nigel Maynard	Commander-in-Chief RAF Strike Command; 1977–1980	Succeeded by Sir Keith Williamson
Preceded by Sir Ruthven Wade	Vice-Chief of the Air Staff; 1976–1977	Succeeded by Sir Peter Terry
Preceded by Peter Horsley	Air Officer Commanding No. 1 Group; 1973–1975	Succeeded by Philip Lagesen
Heraldic offices
Preceded by Sir Michael Pollock	King of Arms of the Order of the Bath; 1985–1999	Succeeded by Sir Brian Kenny
