= Second Tactical Air Force =

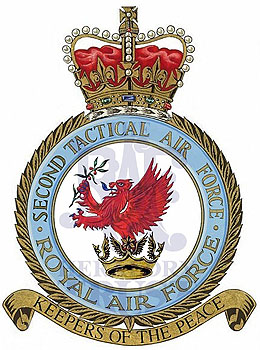
- Badge of the Second Tactical Air Force
- Active: June 1943 – July 1945; September 1951 - 1 January 1959
- Country: United Kingdom
- Branch: Royal Air Force
- Type: tactical air force
- Role: air superiority and support ground offensive
- Motto: Keepers of the peace
- March: Royal Air Force March Past

Insignia
- Badge: Winged demi-lion above an astral crown grasping an olive branch

The Second Tactical Air Force (2TAF) was one of three tactical air forces within the Royal Air Force (RAF) during and after the Second World War. It was made up of squadrons and personnel from the RAF, other British Commonwealth air forces, and exiles from German-occupied Europe. Renamed as British Air Forces of Occupation in 1945, 2TAF was recreated in 1951 and became Royal Air Force Germany in 1959.

== Formation ==
2TAF was formed on 1 June 1943 as HQ Tactical Air Force from Army Co-operation Command, in connection with preparations then in train to invade Europe a year later. It took units from both Fighter Command and Bomber Command in order to form a force capable of supporting the British Army in the field. Bomber Command provided No. 2 Group with its light bombers; Fighter Command was split into the Air Defence of Great Britain, retaining fighter units for home defence, and No. 83 Group and No. 84 Group operating aircraft, and No. 85 Group controlling ground-based units, for the Second Tactical Air Force. In addition, No. 38 Group for towing assault gliders and No. 140 Squadron, providing strategic photo-reconnaissance, were also part of the tactical air force at its inception.

== Second World War ==
2TAF's first commander was Air Marshal Sir John d'Albiac, who, on 21 January 1944, was succeeded by the man most associated with Second TAF, Air Marshal Sir Arthur Coningham. Coningham had great experience of the type of operations required for supporting fast moving ground warfare due to his command of the Desert Air Force in North Africa and Italy. He honed Second TAF into a command up to the challenges presented to it, and incorporated many of the lessons from Italy, including the use of the "cab rank" system for aircraft for close air support, into the doctrine of Second TAF.

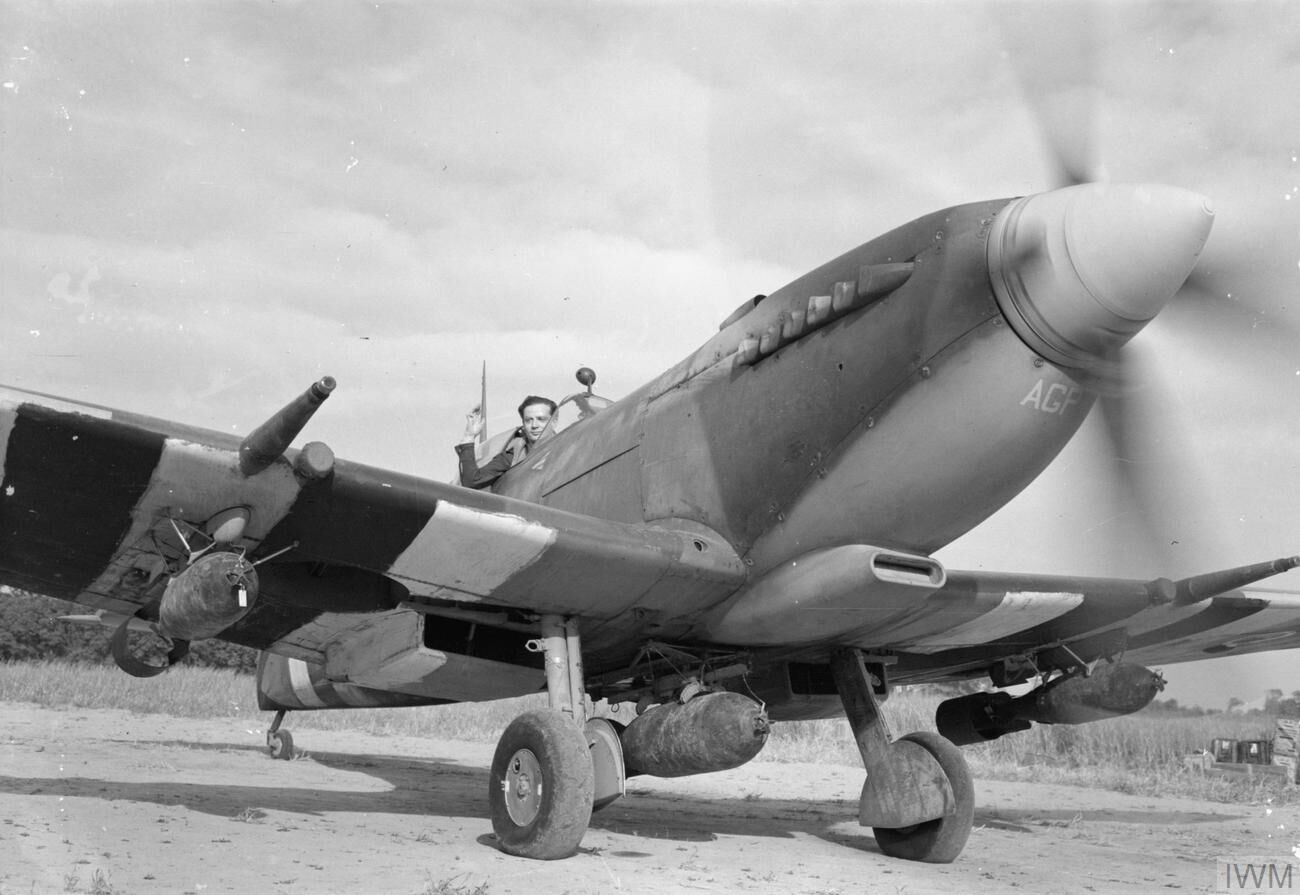
Geoffrey Page, commander of 125 Wing of the Second TAF, about to take off on a sortie from Longues-sur-Mer, Normandy, in a Spitfire IX, (June 1944).

No. 34 (Photo Reconnaissance) Wing, commanded by Royal Navy Commodore E.C. Thornton, served as the air spotting pool for naval gunfire support throughout Operation Overlord. The wing included No. 2 Squadron RAF, No. 26 Squadron RAF, No. 63 Squadron RAF, No. 268 Squadron RAF, No. 414 Squadron RCAF, 808 Naval Air Squadron, 885 Naval Air Squadron, 886 Naval Air Squadron, 897 Naval Air Squadron and, briefly, the United States Navy's VOS-7.

By this late stage in the war, the German Luftwaffe was but a pale shadow of the organisation it had once been. Mostly Second TAF spent its time supporting the British and Canadian forces on the left flank of Supreme Headquarters Allied Expeditionary Force's command. One notable exception was the last great attack of the Luftwaffe, Operation Bodenplatte, mounted on New Year's Day 1945, when the Second TAF suffered serious losses on the ground.

On 20 January 1945, four Gloster Meteors jets from 616 Squadron were moved to Melsbroek in Belgium and attached to the Second Tactical Air Force.

In February 1945 No. 87 Group RAF was established, a transport formation. It became part of 2nd TAF/BAFO, but was reduced to No. 87 Wing RAF on 15 July 1946.

== Post Second World War ==
The Second TAF was renamed as the British Air Forces of Occupation on 15 July 1945. It began as a large force of four groups (2, 83, 84, 85 Groups) but 2 Group disbanded on 1 May 1947.

By the end of 1947, the forces had shrunk to ten squadrons at three airfields, all directly under control of the Air Headquarters at Bad Eilsen. In 1951, the British Air Forces of Occupation reverted to their former name with the re-creation of the Second Tactical Air Force on 1 September 1951.

No. 2 Group was transferred again to Second Tactical Air Force on 1 September 1951, but was disbanded on 15 November 1958. No. 83 Group RAF controlled 2TAF's southern area from 1952 to 1958. On 1 July 1956, No. 2 Group appeared to encompass wings at Ahlhorn (No. 125 Wing RAF), RAF Fassberg (No. 121 Wing RAF), Gutersloh (No. 551 Wing RAF, under the control of Bomber Command), Jever (No. 122 Wing RAF), Laarbruch (34 Wing), RAF Oldenburg (No. 124 Wing RAF), and RAF Wunstorf (No. 123 Wing RAF), while No. 83 Group directed wings at RAF Bruggen, RAF Celle, RAF Geilenkirchen, RAF Wahn, and RAF Wildenrath.

The Second Tactical Air Force was redesignated Royal Air Force Germany on 1 January 1959, at which point C.-in-C. RAF Germany became commander of the NATO Second Allied Tactical Air Force (2 ATAF).

== Commanders ==
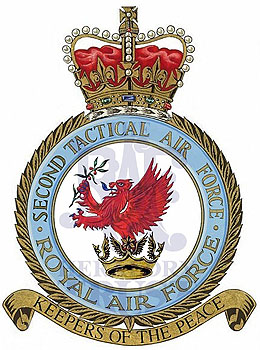
Official badge of Second Tactical Air Force

=== Second Tactical Air Force ===
- 1 June 1943 Air Marshal Sir John D'Albiac
- 21 January 1944 Air Marshal Sir Arthur Coningham

=== British Air Forces of Occupation ===
- 15 July 1945 Air Chief Marshal Sir Sholto Douglas
- 1 February 1946 Air Marshal Sir Philip Wigglesworth
- 30 October 1948 Air Marshal Sir Thomas Williams

=== Second Tactical Air Force ===
- 1 October 1951 Air Chief Marshal Sir Robert Foster
- 3 December 1953 Air Marshal Sir Harry Broadhurst
- 22 January 1956 Air Marshal The Earl of Bandon
- 1 June 1957 – Air Marshal Sir Humphrey Edwardes-Jones

=== Royal Air Force Germany ===
- 1 January 1959 – Air Marshal Sir Humphrey Edwardes-Jones
- 7 January 1961 – Air Marshal Sir John Grandy
- 25 June 1963 – Air Marshal Sir Ronald Lees
- 6 December 1965 – Air Marshal Sir Denis Spotswood
- 16 July 1968 – Air Marshal Christopher Foxley-Norris
- 10 November 1970 – Air Marshal Harold Brownlow Martin
- 4 April 1973 – Air Marshal Nigel Maynard
- 19 January 1976 – Air Marshal Sir Michael Beetham
- 25 July 1977 – Air Marshal Sir John Stacey
- 30 April 1979 – Air Marshal Sir Peter Terry
- 2 February 1981 – Air Marshal Sir Thomas Kennedy
- 9 April 1983 – Air Marshal Sir Patrick Hine
- 1 July 1985 – Air Marshal Sir David Parry-Evans
- 13 April 1987 – Air Marshal Sir Anthony Skingsley
- 14 April 1989 – Air Marshal Sir Roger Palin
- 22 April 1991 – Air Marshal Sir Andrew Wilson

== See also ==
- RAF First Tactical Air Force
- RAF Third Tactical Air Force
- List of Royal Air Force commands
