= Wilfrid Freeman =

Royal Air Force air marshal (1888–1953)

Sir Wilfrid Rhodes Freeman
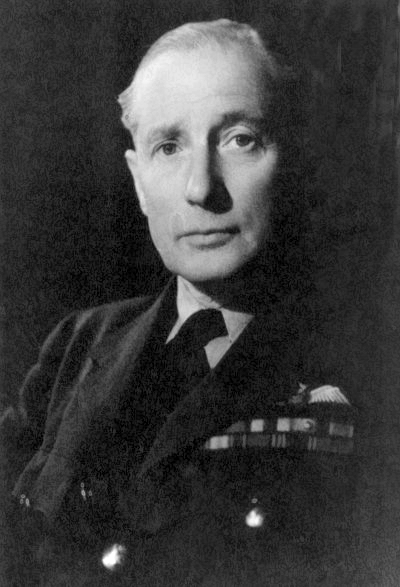
- Sir Wilfrid Freeman
- Born: 18 July 1888
- Died: 15 May 1953 (aged 64)
- Military career
- Allegiance: United Kingdom
- Branch: British Army (1908–1918); Royal Air Force (1918–1942)
- Service years: 1908–1942
- Rank: Air Chief Marshal
- Commands: Vice-Chief of the Air Staff (1940–1942); RAF Staff College, Andover (1933–1935); RAF Leuchars (1928–1929); Central Flying School (1925–1927); No. 2 Flying Training School (1920–22); No. 2 Group (1918); No. 14 Squadron RFC (1916)
- Conflicts: First World War; Second World War
- Awards: Knight Grand Cross of the Order of the Bath; Distinguished Service Order; Military Cross; Mentioned in Despatches (3); Knight of the Legion of Honour (France)
- Other work: Work at Courtaulds

Air Chief Marshal Sir Wilfrid Rhodes Freeman, 1st Baronet, GCB, DSO, MC, FRAeS (18 July 1888 – 15 May 1953) was one of the most important influences on the rearmament of the Royal Air Force (RAF) in the years up to and including the Second World War. He was part of the delegation that accompanied Prime Minister Winston Churchill at the Atlantic Conference, birthplace of the Atlantic Charter.

== RAF career ==
Having joined the Royal Flying Corps in 1914, he saw active service during the First World War as Officer Commanding No. 14 Squadron and then as Officer Commanding 10 Wing and then 9 Wing, and continued to serve in the newly formed RAF during the inter-war years. He was made Commandant of the Central Flying School in 1925, deputy director of Operations and Intelligence at the Air Ministry in 1927 and Station Commander at RAF Leuchars in 1928. He went on to be Air Officer Commanding Transjordan and Palestine in 1930, Commandant of the RAF Staff College, Andover, in 1933.

In 1936, as Air Member for Research and Development, he was given the job of choosing the aircraft with which to rearm the RAF, and in 1938 his remit was expanded to include the controlling of their production, which he did with great distinction until 1940. In November 1940 he was moved against his will to become Vice-Chief of the Air Staff. His department, now formed into the Ministry of Aircraft Production (MAP) by the opportunistic Lord Beaverbrook (who took credit for much of Freeman's work) rapidly stagnated, and after two years Freeman was moved back to MAP which he continued to run with distinction.

More perhaps than any other single figure, Freeman was responsible for the RAF ordering the Hawker Hurricane, Supermarine Spitfire, De Havilland Mosquito, Avro Lancaster, Handley-Page Halifax and Hawker Tempest. He played an equally vital role in the development of the Merlin-engined P-51 Mustang, providing North American Aviation with the original specification and then installing Rolls-Royce Merlin engines in place of the unsatisfactory Allison V-1710 engines.

== Honours and awards ==
- Baronet – 4 July 1945
- Knight Grand Cross of the Order of the Bath (GCB – 20 October 1942, KCB – 11 May 1937, CB – 1 January 1932)
- Distinguished Service Order – 23 November 1916
- Military Cross – 27 March 1915
- Mention in Despatches – 22 June 1915, 25 September 1916, 11 December 1917
- Chevalier of the Legion of Honour (France) – 17 August 1918
- Fellow of the Royal Aeronautical Society

Coat of arms of Wilfrid Freeman
Crest A fusil Or between two wings displayed Azure. Escutcheon Per fess Azure and Vair Ancien three fusils in chief and a crescent in base Or a bordure engrailed Gules. Motto E Labore Libertas

Military offices
New title Group established	Officer Commanding No. 2 Group; 1918	Vacant Title next held by Bertine Sutton
Preceded by Felton Holt	Commandant of the Central Flying School; 1925–1927	Succeeded by Charles Burnett
Preceded by Philip Joubert de la Ferté	Commandant of the RAF Staff College, Andover; 1933–1935	Succeeded by Sir Arthur Barratt
Preceded by Sir Hugh Dowding	Air Member for Research and Development; Post renamed Air Member for Development and Production on 1 August 1938; 1936–1940	Ministry of Aircraft Production created
Preceded by Sir Richard Peirse	Vice-Chief of the Air Staff; 1940–1942	Succeeded by Charles Medhurst (Acting)
Baronetage of the United Kingdom
New creation	Baronet (of Murtle); 1945–1953	Succeeded by John Freeman
