= Freeman baronets =

Baronetcy in the Baronetage of the United Kingdom

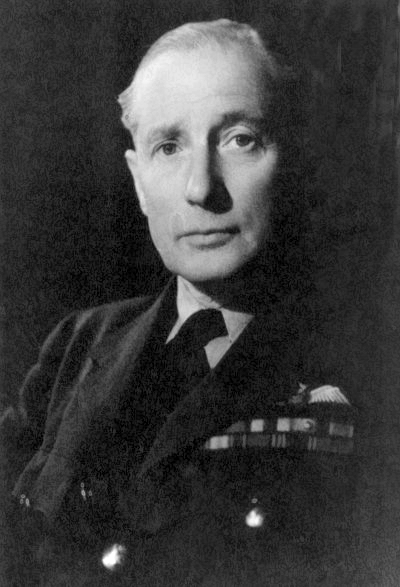
Sir Wilfrid Freeman, 1st Baronet

The Freeman Baronetcy, of Murtle in the County of Aberdeen, is a title in the Baronetage of the United Kingdom. It was created on 4 July 1945 for Air Chief Marshal Wilfrid Freeman. As of 2010 the presumed rightful holder (the first Baronet's grandson) has not successfully proven his succession to the baronetcy and is therefore not on the Official Roll of the Baronetage, with the title considered dormant.

== Freeman baronets, of Murtle (1945) ==
- Sir Wilfrid Rhodes Freeman, 1st Baronet (1888–1953)
- Sir John Keith Noel Freeman, 2nd Baronet (1923–1981)
- James Robin Freeman, presumed 3rd Baronet (born 1955)

There is no subsequent heir to the baronetcy.

Coat of arms of Freeman baronets
Crest A fusil Or between two wings displayed Azure. Escutcheon Per fess Azure and Vair Ancien three fusils in chief and a crescent in base Or a bordure engrailed Gules. Motto E Labore Libertas
