= Ruthven Wade =

Royal Air Force Air Chief Marshal (1920-2001)

Sir Ruthven Wade
- Born: 15 July 1920
- Died: 24 September 2001 (aged 81)
- Military career
- Allegiance: United Kingdom
- Branch: Royal Air Force
- Service years: 1938–78
- Rank: Air chief marshal
- Commands: Vice-Chief of the Air Staff (1973–76); No. 1 Group (1968–71); RAF Gaydon (1962–65); No. 39 Squadron (1959–60)
- Conflicts: Second World War
- Awards: Knight Commander of the Order of the Bath; Distinguished Flying Cross

Air Chief Marshal Sir Ruthven Lowry "Gerry" Wade, KCB, DFC (15 July 1920 – 24 September 2001) was a senior Royal Air Force officer who served as Vice-Chief of the Air Staff from 1973 to 1976.

== RAF career ==
Educated at Cheltenham College, Wade joined the Royal Air Force in 1938 and served in the Second World War. After the war, he became Officer Commanding No. 39 Squadron and then Station Commander at RAF Gaydon. He was appointed Director of Operations – Bomber and Reconnaissance in 1966, Air Executive to Deputy for Nuclear Affairs at SHAPE in 1967, and Air Officer Commanding No. 1 Group in 1968. He went on to be Deputy Commander-in-Chief at RAF Germany in 1971, Assistant Chief of the Air Staff (Operations) in January 1973, and Vice-Chief of the Air Staff in November 1973. His last appointment was as Chief of Personnel and Logistics in 1976 before he retired in 1978.

== Family ==
In 1945 he married Denise Davis; they had a son.

Military offices
Preceded by Sir Denis Smallwood	Vice-Chief of the Air Staff; 1973–1976	Succeeded by Sir David Evans
