= Vice-Chief of the Air Staff (United Kingdom) =

The British Vice-Chief of the Air Staff (VCAS) was the post occupied by the senior Royal Air Force officer who served as a senior assistant to the Chief of the Air Staff. The post was created during World War II on 22 April 1940 and its incumbent sat on the Air Council. It was abolished in 1985 when the post's responsibilities were combined with those of the Assistant Chief of the Air Staff (Policy) and the Assistant Chief of the Air Staff (Operations) to create a single post, the Assistant Chief of the Air Staff.

The Vice-Chief was responsible for defining the operational requirements for the RAF and conducting wider strategic planning.

== Vice-Chiefs of the Air Staff ==
Holders of the post included:

- 22 April 1940 – 4 October 1940 Air Marshal Sir Richard Peirse
- 4 October 1940 – 19 October 1942 Air Chief Marshal Sir Wilfrid Freeman
- 19 October 1942 – 21 March 1943 Air Vice-Marshal C E H Medhurst (acting) Air Chief Marshal Tedder had been due to take the appointment but after a meeting with Eisenhower, the Americans asked Churchill to appoint Tedder as Air Commander for the whole Mediterranean area.
- 21 March 1943 – 1 June 1946 Sir Douglas Evill
- 1 June 1946 – 1947 Air Marshal Sir William Dickson
- 1947 – 1948 Air Marshal Sir James Robb
- 1 November 1948 Air Marshal Sir Arthur Sanders
- 1 March 1950 Air Chief Marshal The Honourable Sir Ralph Cochrane
- 1 November 1952 Air Marshal Sir John Baker
- 9 November 1953 Air Marshal Sir Ronald Ivelaw-Chapman
- 16 September 1957 Air Marshal Sir Edmund Hudleston
- 2 March 1962 Air Marshal Sir Wallace Kyle
- November 1964 Air Marshal Sir Brian Burnett
- 6 November 1967 Air Marshal Sir Peter Fletcher
- 1 August 1970 Air Chief Marshal Sir Denis Smallwood
- 1 November 1973 Air Marshal Sir Ruthven Wade
- February 1976 Air Marshal Sir David Evans
- March 1977 Air Marshal Sir Peter Terry
- 30 January 1979 Air Marshal Sir John Nicholls
- May 1980 Air Marshal Sir David Craig
- August 1982 Air Marshal Sir Peter Harding
