= Keith Williamson =

Marshal of the Royal Air Force (1928-2018)

Marshal of the Royal Air Force Sir Keith Williamson GCB AFC
- Sir Keith Williamson
- Born: 28 February 1928; Leytonstone, London
- Died: 2 May 2018 (aged 90)
- Military career
- Allegiance: United Kingdom
- Branch: Royal Air Force
- Service years: 1945–1985
- Rank: Marshal of the Royal Air Force
- Commands: Chief of the Air Staff (1982–85); Strike Command (1980–82); Support Command (1978–80); RAF Staff College, Bracknell (1975–77); RAF Gütersloh (1968–71); No. 23 Squadron (1966–68)
- Conflicts: Korean War
- Awards: Knight Grand Cross of the Order of the Bath; Air Force Cross

Marshal of the Royal Air Force Sir Keith Alec Williamson, GCB, AFC (25 February 1928 – 2 May 2018) was a senior officer in the Royal Air Force. He served with the Royal Australian Air Force flying Meteors in a ground attack role during the Korean War. He was a squadron commander and then a station commander during the 1960s and a senior air commander in the 1980s. He was Chief of the Air Staff during the early 1980s at the time of the emergency airlift of food and supplies to Ethiopia ("Operation Bushel").

== RAF career ==
The son of Percy Williamson and his wife Gertrude, Williamson was educated at Bancroft's School and Market Harborough Grammar School. He enlisted in the Aircraft Apprentice Scheme at RAF Halton in 1945. After graduating in 1948, he was selected for a cadetship at RAF College Cranwell and was commissioned on 13 December 1950. After passing-out from Cranwell as a pilot officer, he was sent to the Advanced Flying School at RAF Driffield, where he trained on Meteors and Vampires. He was then posted to No. 112 Squadron in July 1951 flying Vampires initially from RAF Fassberg and then from RAF Jever in Germany. He was promoted to flying officer on 13 December 1951.

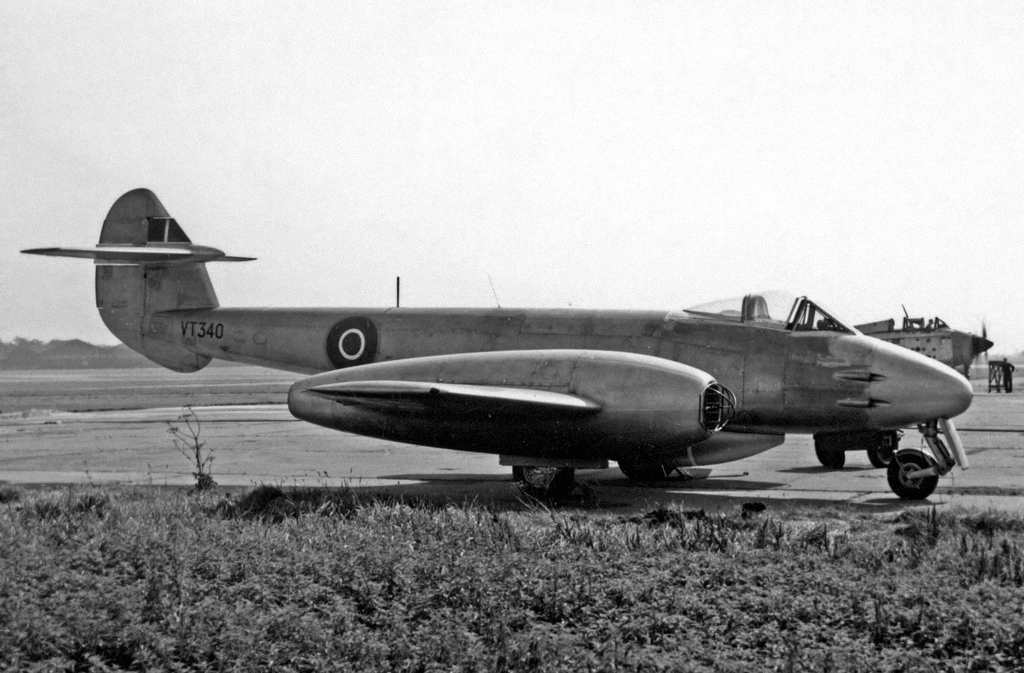
Gloster Meteor, a type flown by Williamson during the Korean War

In January 1953 he volunteered to join No. 77 Squadron RAAF flying Meteors in a ground attack role in the Korean War. He was promoted to flight lieutenant on 13 June 1953. He returned home in late 1953 to become aide-de-camp to Air Marshal Sir Harold Lydford, the Air Officer Commanding-in-Chief, RAF Home Command. After briefly returning to No. 112 Squadron in 1956, he joined No. 20 Squadron at RAF Oldenburg in Germany as a flight commander flying Hunters. Promoted to squadron leader on 1 July 1958. that year he went to the Central Flying School where he became a Qualified Flying Instructor and then an examiner.

Williamson attended the RAF Staff College in 1962 and was then posted to the Air Secretary's department at the Air Ministry. He was promoted to wing commander on 1 January 1964. He was given command of No. 23 Squadron flying Lightnings from RAF Leuchars in 1966. On 1 July 1968 he was promoted to group captain and became Station Commander at RAF Gütersloh in Germany. He was awarded the Air Force Cross in the 1968 Birthday Honours.

After this tour in Germany he returned to the UK and attended the Royal College of Defence Studies in 1971. After this he became Director of Air Staff Plans at the Ministry of Defence in 1972 and was promoted to air commodore on 1 January 1973. Promoted to air vice marshal on 1 July 1975, he was appointed Commandant of the RAF Staff College, Bracknell, on 16 August 1975.

Williamson went on to be Assistant Chief of Staff (Plans and Policy) at SHAPE on 10 March 1977 and then became Air Officer Commanding-in-Chief at Support Command with the acting rank of air marshal on 30 August 1978. He was promoted to the substantive rank of air marshal on 1 January 1979.

Williamson was made Commander-in-Chief Strike Command with the acting rank of air chief marshal on 15 September 1980. He was promoted to the substantive rank of air chief marshal on 1 March 1981 and advanced to Knight Grand Cross of the Order of the Bath in the 1982 Birthday Honours.

He became Chief of the Air Staff on 15 October 1982 and was appointed Air Aide-de-Camp to the Queen on the same day. As Chief of the Air Staff he persuaded the British Government to build a completely new airfield at Mount Pleasant in the Falkland Islands in the aftermath of the Falklands War. He also implemented the emergency airlift of food and supplies to Ethiopia in the wake of severe drought, famine and civil war there ("Operation Bushel") and advised on the international agreement to proceed with the European Fighter programme. He was promoted to Marshal of the Royal Air Force on 15 October 1985 and retired the same month.

== Later work ==
In retirement Williamson devoted much of his time to the Presidency of the Royal Air Forces Association. He was also Vice-President of SSAFA. He died on 2 May 2018 at the age of 90.

== Personal life ==
In 1953 he married Patricia Anne Watts; they had two sons and two daughters. His interests included golf.

== Sources ==
- Probert, Henry (1991). High Commanders of the Royal Air Force. HMSO. ISBN 0-11-772635-4.

Military offices
Preceded by D F C Ross	Station Commander RAF Gutersloh; 1968–1971	Succeeded by Michael Horace Miller
Preceded by Alasdair Steedman	Commandant of the RAF Staff College, Bracknell; Air Officer Commanding Command and Staff Training; 1975–1977	Succeeded by John Curtiss
Preceded by Sir Rex Roe	Commander-in-Chief Support Command; 1978–1980	Succeeded by Sir John Gingell
Preceded by Sir David Evans	Commander-in-Chief RAF Strike Command; 1980–1982	Succeeded by Sir David Craig
Preceded by Sir Michael Beetham	Chief of the Air Staff; 1982–1985	Succeeded by Sir David Craig
