= Michael Beetham =

Marshal of the Royal Air Force (1923–2015)

Marshal of the Royal Air Force Sir Michael Beetham GCB CBE DFC AFC DL
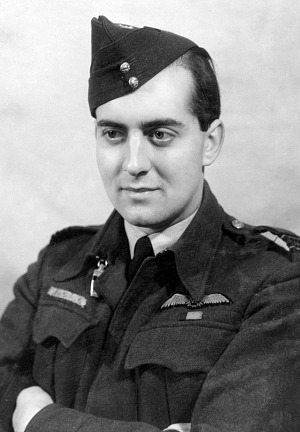
- Beetham as a flight lieutenant in May 1944
- Born: 17 May 1923; London, England
- Died: 24 October 2015 (aged 92)
- Military career
- Allegiance: United Kingdom
- Branch: Royal Air Force
- Service years: 1941–1982
- Rank: Marshal of the Royal Air Force
- Commands: Chief of the Air Staff (1977–82); RAF Germany (1976–77); RAF Staff College (1970–72); RAF Khormaksar (1963–65); No. 214 Squadron (1958–59)
- Conflicts: Second World War; Battle of Berlin; Aden Emergency; Falklands War
- Awards: Knight Grand Cross of the Order of the Bath; Commander of the Order of the British Empire; Distinguished Flying Cross; Air Force Cross; King's Commendation for Valuable Service in the Air

Marshal of the Royal Air Force Sir Michael James Beetham, GCB, CBE, DFC, AFC, DL (17 May 1923 – 24 October 2015) was a Second World War bomber pilot and a high-ranking commander in the Royal Air Force from the 1960s to the 1980s. As Chief of the Air Staff during the Falklands War, he was involved in the decision to send the Task Force to the South Atlantic. At the time of his death, Beetham was one of only six people holding his service's most senior rank and, excluding Prince Philip's honorary rank, he had the longest time in that rank, making him the senior Marshal of the Royal Air Force.

== Early life ==
The son of Major G. C. Beetham MC, Beetham was born in London on 17 May 1923. He was educated at St Marylebone Grammar School.

== RAF career ==
=== Second World War ===
As a young man he witnessed the Battle of Britain from the ground which prompted him to join the RAF in May 1941. Promoted to leading aircraftman on 19 June 1942, Beetham was granted an emergency commission as a pilot officer on probation in the RAFVR on 13 December 1942. He was promoted to flying officer in the RAFVR on 13 June 1943.

Following flying training in the United States under the Arnold Scheme and in Great Britain, he was assigned flying duties with 50 Squadron just prior to the Battle of Berlin. During the Battle, Beetham flew his Lancaster on bombing missions over Berlin 10 times. In a raid over Augsburg he lost an engine. He also survived the Nuremberg Raid in which many Bomber Command aircraft were destroyed. In February 1944, whilst Beetham was on a training flight, one of his aircraft's engines caught fire. Beetham and his crew bailed out, landing by parachute near East Kirkby; Beetham then joined the Caterpillar Club. During his time on 50 Squadron, Beetham carried out 30 operations over enemy territory.

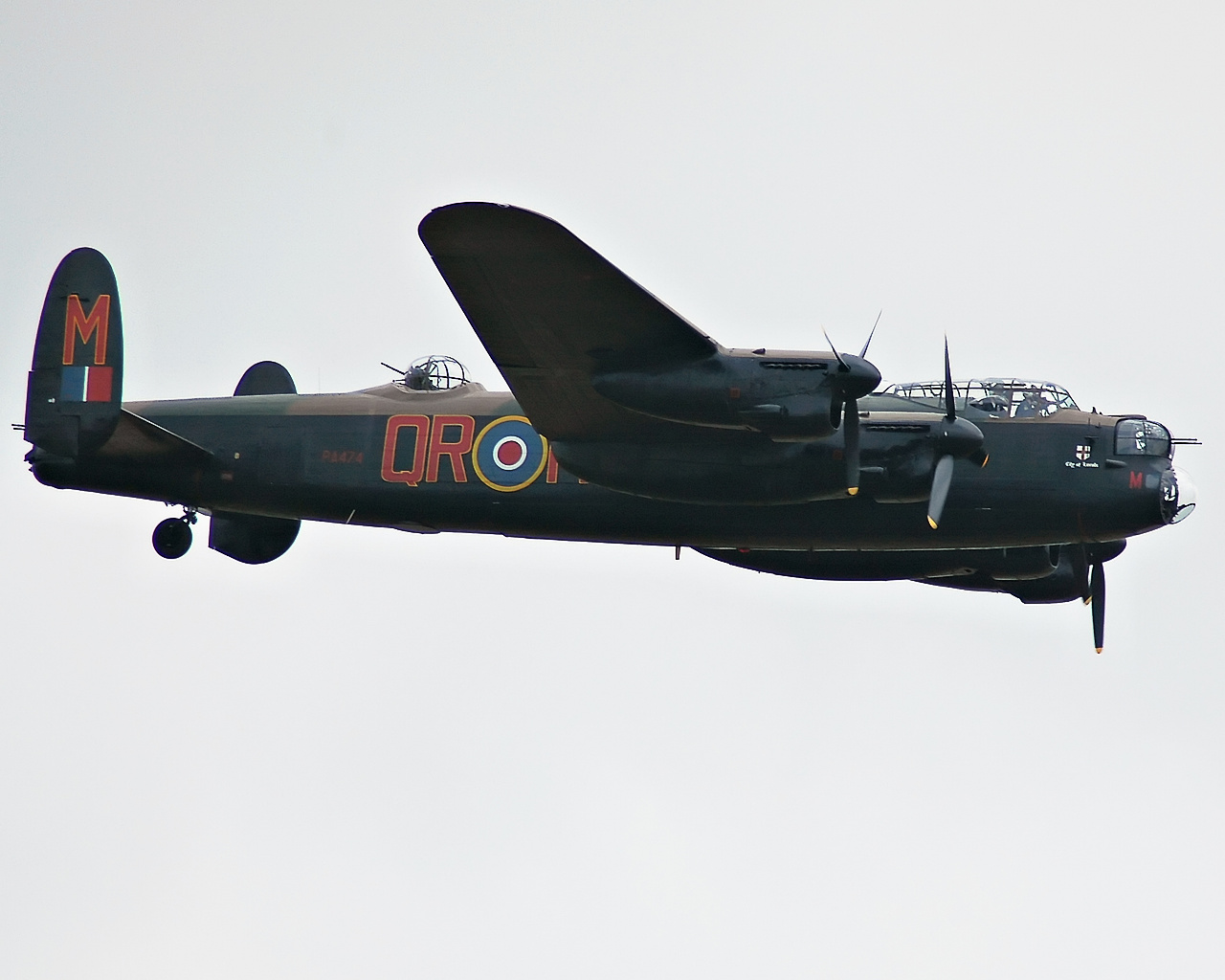
Avro Lancaster, a type flown by Beetham during the Second World War

In May 1944 Beetham was posted to a flying instruction role. He returned to operation duties with 57 Squadron just as the war in Europe was coming to an end. He was involved in dropping supplies to the Dutch and in the repatriation of prisoners-of-war. As an acting flight lieutenant in the RAFVR, he was awarded the Distinguished Flying Cross on 6 June 1944, and was promoted to flight lieutenant on 13 December 1944.

=== Post-war career ===
In November 1945, just after the end of the Second World War, Beetham was posted to No. 35 Squadron which was then selected to carry out the victory fly-past and conduct a good-will tour of the United States. He was granted a permanent commission in the RAF on 1 September 1945 in the rank of flying officer, and was promoted to flight lieutenant on 1 July 1946 with seniority from 13 June 1945. He was posted to No. 82 (Recce) Squadron in East Africa in 1949, promoted to squadron leader on 1 January 1952 and attended the RAF Staff College, Andover that year. Beetham was also awarded a King's Commendation for Valuable Service in the Air in the 1952 New Year Honours.

In 1953, Beetham was posted to the Air Ministry's Operational Requirements Branch. Much of his time was taken up with the problems of bringing the V-bombers into service. Notably, Beetham also drafted the first specification for the TSR 2. Beetham's next appointment was as the Personal Staff Officer to Task Force Commander of Operation Buffalo in 1956. The open-air nuclear test explosions witnessed by Beetham led him to the view that it would never be possible to limit the extent of a nuclear war.

Beetham was promoted to wing commander on 1 January 1958 and he then took up the post of Officer Commanding No. 214 Squadron. In July 1959 Wing Commander Beetham captained the first aircraft, a Valiant bomber, to fly non-stop from the United Kingdom to Cape Town. He was awarded the Air Force Cross in the 1960 New Year Honours.

After several staff tours, during which time he was promoted to group captain on 1 January 1962, Beetham was appointed Station Commander RAF Khormaksar (in Aden) in November 1963. At the time of his arrival, Khormaksar was the RAF's largest overseas base and markedly overcrowded. That December saw the start of a major attacks against British forces in Aden (the Aden Emergency) and over the next two years Beetham spent considerable time dealing with the security of his overcrowded station. However, the security problems did not prevent the aircraft based at Khormaksar being used on operations in the neighbouring region of Radfan.

=== Air officer appointments ===
Beetham was promoted to air commodore on 1 July 1966. He was appointed a Commander of the Order of the British Empire in the 1967 New Year Honours. More senior appointments followed: these included Director of Strike Operations in 1968 and Commandant of the RAF Staff College at Bracknell in 1970 as an acting air vice-marshal. He was promoted to air vice-marshal on 1 January 1971, and appointed Assistant Chief of Staff (Plans and Policy) at Supreme Headquarters Allied Powers Europe in 1972 and to Deputy Commander-in-Chief of Strike Command in 1975, for which he was promoted to acting air marshal on 10 June 1975. He was promoted to air marshal on 1 July 1975, knighted with the Knight Commander of the Order of the Bath in the 1976 New Year Honours and appointed Commander-in-Chief RAF Germany and Commander of the Second Tactical Air Force in 1976.

=== Chief of the Air Staff ===
Promoted to air chief marshal on 21 May 1977, Beetham's final tour saw him appointed Air Aide-de-Camp to the Queen on 31 July 1977 and the Chief of the Air Staff on 1 August 1977. He was promoted to a Knight Grand Cross of the Order of the Bath (GCB) in the 1978 New Year Honours list. As the professional head of his Service, Beetham defended the decision to introduce the strike version of the Tornado and supported the introduction of the Airborne Early Warning Nimrod which was later cancelled. He also worked to build up the RAF's reserve forces. Towards the end of his tenure as Chief of the Air Staff, the Argentine invasion of the Falkland Islands occurred: at the time Beetham was acting Chief of the Defence Staff and as such he was involved in the decision to send the Task Force to the South Atlantic. Operation Black Buck, the bombing raids on Argentine positions in the Falkland Islands, were Beetham's idea. When Beetham relinquished his appointment in October 1982 he had served for more than five years, making him the longest serving Chief of the Air Staff since Trenchard. He was promoted to Marshal of the Royal Air Force on 15 October 1982.

== Later life ==
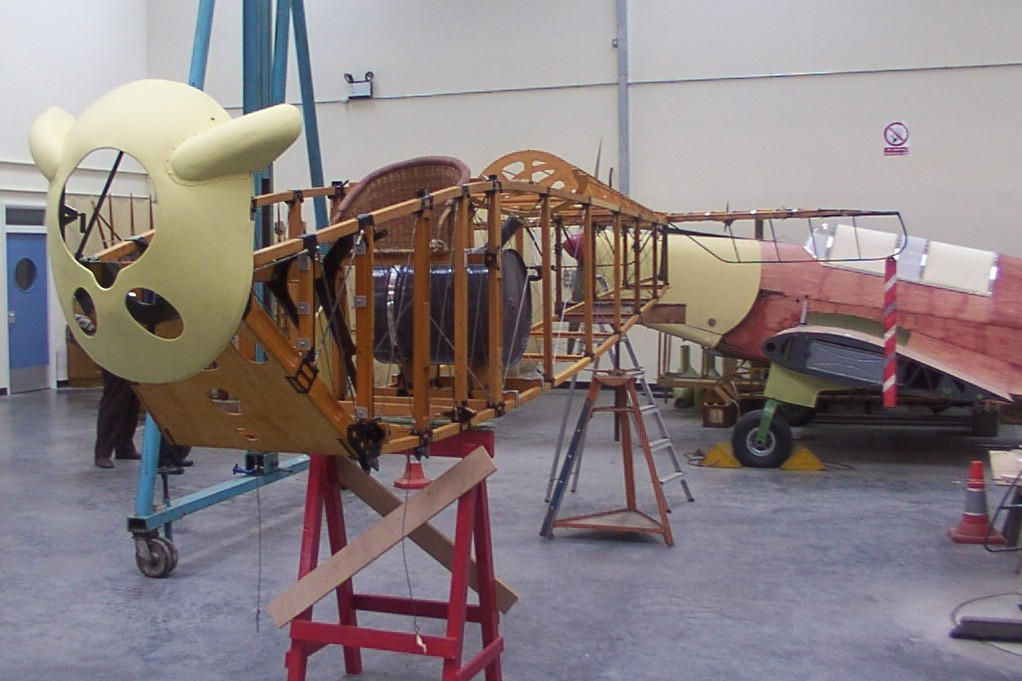
The Michael Beetham Conservation Centre at the RAF Museum Cosford.

As a Marshal of the Royal Air Force, Beetham remained on the RAF's Active List, although for practical purposes he retired in 1982. From 1986 to 1990 Beetham was Chairman of GEC Avionics. In 1989 he was made a deputy lieutenant of the County of Norfolk. Michael Beetham held the appointment of Honorary Air Commodore of No 2620 Squadron, Royal Auxiliary Air Force Regiment. He was President of the Society of Friends of the RAF Museum. The Museum's conservation centre is named the Michael Beetham Conservation Centre in his honour. Beetham was also President of the Bomber Command Association.

In 2005, Beetham took part in his second fly-past over London, this time as part of the celebrations marking the 60th anniversary of the end of World War II. He joined the crew of the Battle of Britain Memorial Flight Lancaster bomber prior to its takeoff from Duxford.

Beetham wrote the foreword to four books:

- Bombs Gone: Development and Use of British Air-dropped Weapons from 1912 to Present Day – Patrick Stephens Ltd (1990)
- In Cobhams' Company – Published by Cobham Plc (1994)
- Flying Through Fire: FIDO The Fogbuster of World War Two – Published by Grange Books (1995)
- The Strategic War Against Germany – Frank Cass Publishers (1998)

In 2010 Beetham spent time working with the author Peter Jacobs on a biography entitled "Stay the Distance: The Life and Times of Marshal of the Royal Air Force Sir Michael Beetham". The book was published in February 2011.

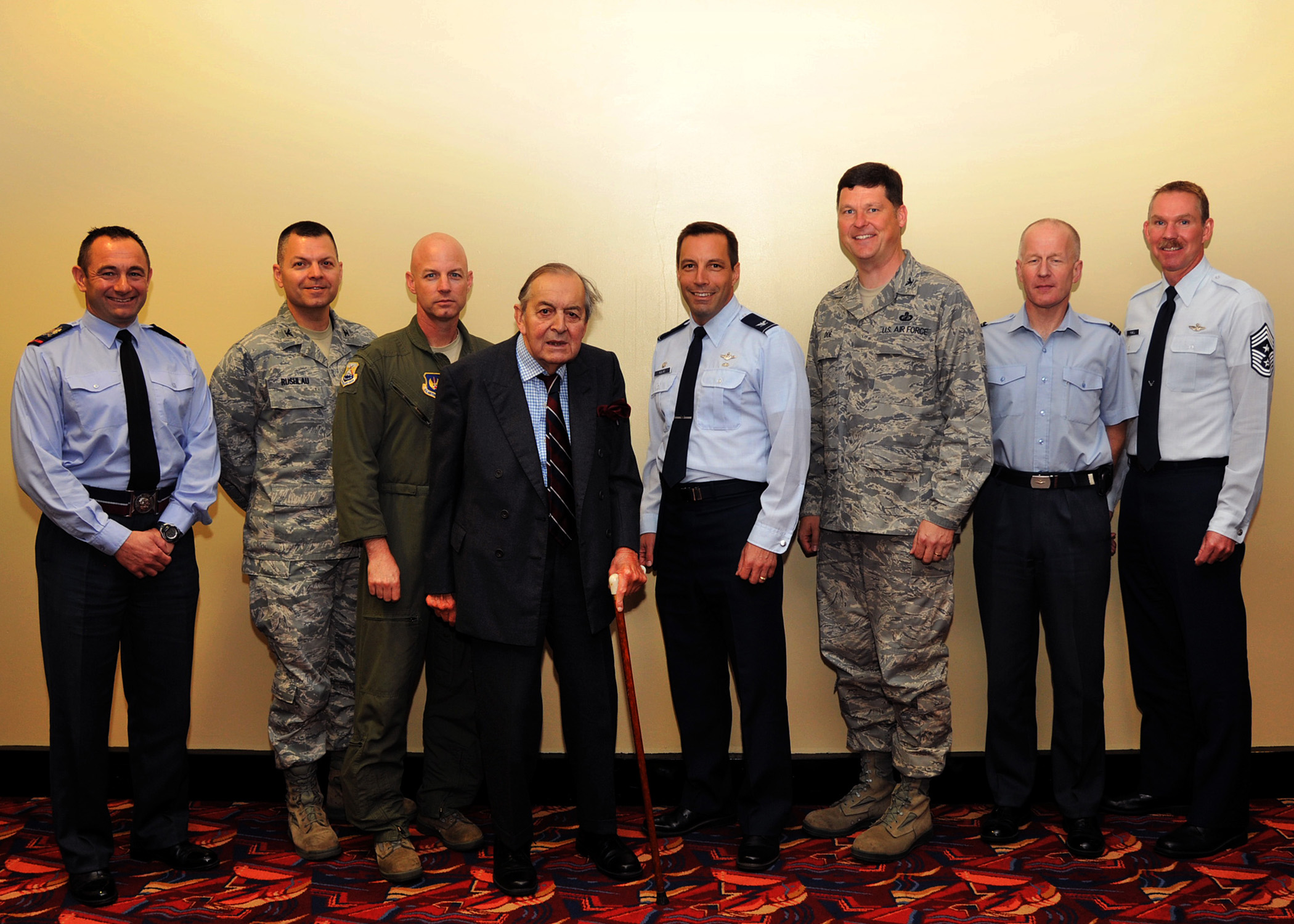
Beetham at RAF Mildenhall with US and British air force personnel in 2011.

In retirement he lived in South Creake, near Fakenham in Norfolk.

Marshal of the RAF Beetham died on 24 October 2015, aged 92. The then Chief of the Air Staff, Air Chief Marshal Sir Andrew Pulford, was to say of Beetham that he was "one of the greatest leaders the Royal Air Force has produced."

== Personal life ==
In 1956 he married Patricia Elizabeth Lane; they have one son and one daughter. Lady Beetham died in January 2016.

== Sources ==
- Jacobs, Peter (2011). Stay the Distance: The Life and Times of Marshal of the Royal Air Force Sir Michael Beetham. Frontline Books. ISBN 978-1-84832-552-4.
- Probert, Henry (1991). High Commanders of the Royal Air Force. HMSO. ISBN 0-11-772635-4.

Military offices
Preceded by Nigel Maynard	Commandant of the RAF Staff College, Bracknell; 1970–1972	Succeeded by Alasdair Steedman
Preceded by Sir Peter Horsley	Deputy Commander-in-Chief RAF Strike Command; 1975–1976	Succeeded by Sir John Stacey
Preceded by Nigel Maynard	Commander-in-Chief RAF Germany; Also Commander of the Second Tactical Air Force; 1976–1977	Succeeded by Sir John Stacey
Preceded by Sir Neil Cameron	Chief of the Air Staff; 1977–1982	Succeeded by Sir Keith Williamson
