= RAF Strike Command =

Former command of the Royal Air Force

Strike Command
- Strike Command Badge
- Active: 30 April 1968–1 April 2007
- Country: United Kingdom
- Branch: Royal Air Force
- Headquarters: RAF High Wycombe
- Mottos: Defend and Strike

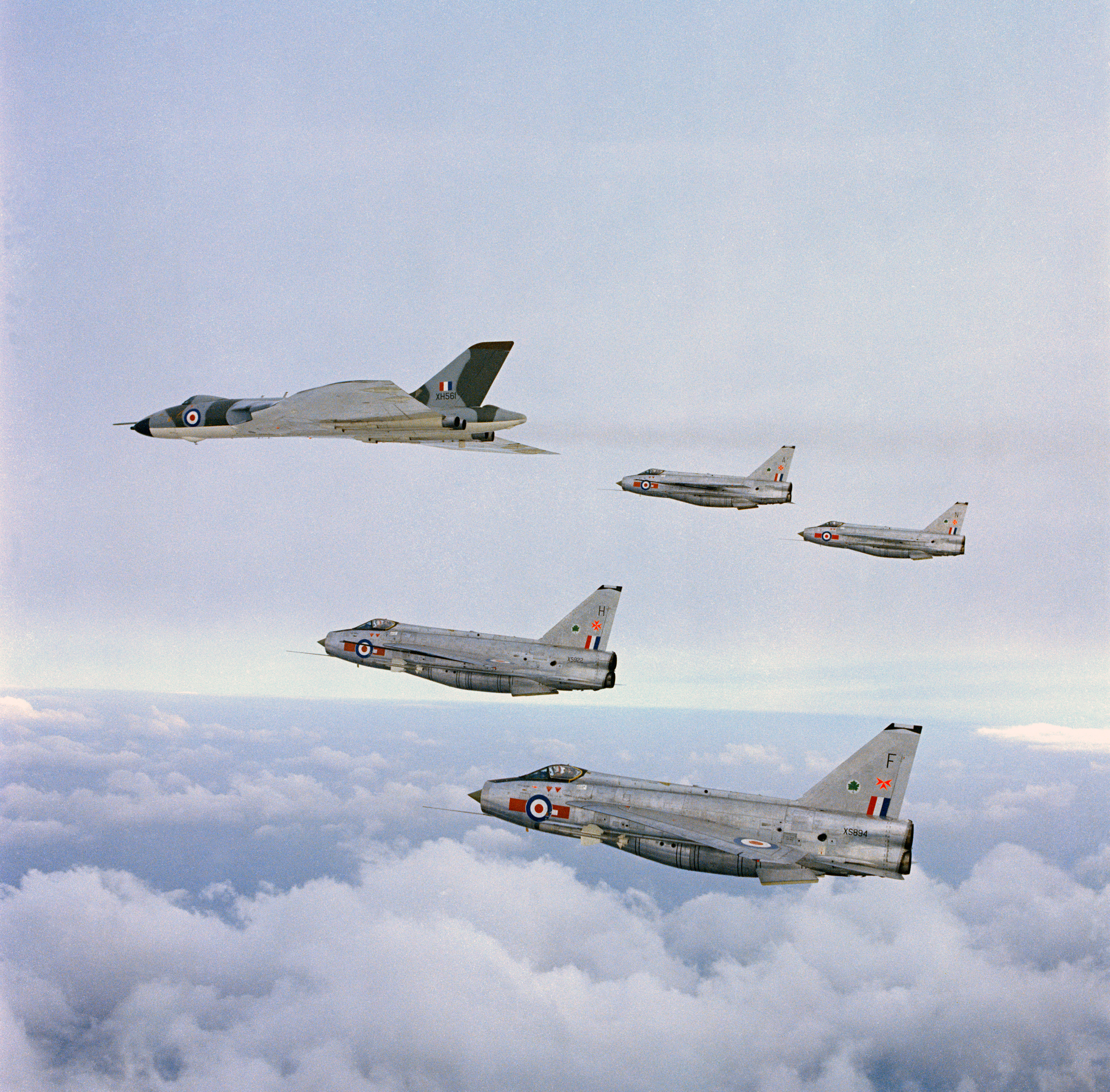
A Vulcan leads four Lightnings in formation to commemorate the formation of Strike Command in 1968.

The Royal Air Force's Strike Command was the military formation which controlled the majority of the United Kingdom's bomber and fighter aircraft from 1968 until 2007 when it merged with Personnel and Training Command to form the single Air Command. It latterly consisted of two formations: No. 1 Group RAF and No. 2 Group RAF. The last Commander-in-Chief was Air Chief Marshal Sir Joe French.

== History ==
Strike Command was formed on 30 April 1968 by the merger of Bomber Command and Fighter Command, which became No. 1 Group and No. 11 Group respectively. Signals Command was absorbed on 1 January 1969, Coastal Command was absorbed on 28 November 1969, becoming No. 18 Group RAF. The former component Coastal Command groups became the Northern Maritime Air Region and Southern Maritime Air Region. Air Support Command (formerly Transport Command) was absorbed on 1 September 1972, becoming No. 46 Group RAF.

=== NATO Role ===
In 1975, the Command doubled as NATO, Commander-in-Chief United Kingdom Air Forces (UKAIR). UKAIR fell under NATO's Allied Command Europe in Mons in Belgium. In case of war with the Warsaw Pact the command would have commanded all Royal Air Force units in the United Kingdom as well as the US Air Force's Third Air Force based at RAF Mildenhall with its subordinate wings and squadrons. Reinforcements coming from the continental United States, as well as units transitioning to other European fronts, would have also come under UKAIR.

=== Post Cold War ===
RAF Germany was absorbed as No. 2 (Bomber) Group on 1 April 1993. As of 1 April 2000, the structure was altered to leave No. 1 Group with tactical fast jet forces, No. 2 Group with air transport, air refueling, and reconnaissance, the RAF Regiment, and No. 32 (The Royal) Squadron RAF. No. 3 Group was to include Nimrod long-range Maritime Patrol aircraft, Search and rescue helicopters, and the Joint Force 2000, later to become Joint Force Harrier. Flag Officer Naval Aviation moved over to command No. 3 Group, the first incumbent becoming Rear Admiral Iain Henderson. "At the core of the structure [were] to be the central air staffs, responsible to Deputy Chief of Staff Operations for air power, ongoing operations, joint training, and force development." The Air Warfare Centre at Waddington and the Military Air Traffic Organisation at Uxbridge also joined Strike Command.

The RAF's Process and Organisation Review concluded that Strike Command and Personnel and Training Command should be co-located at a single command headquarters: it was subsequently decided that both commands should be located at High Wycombe and in 2007 Strike Command and Personnel and Training Command were merged into a single command – Air Command.

== Structure ==
Headquarters Strike Command (often abbreviated to HQSTC) was located at RAF High Wycombe in Buckinghamshire. The Command was divided into a number of Groups, which at first reflected the function of the old Fighter, Bomber and Coastal Command. Subsequent reorganisations changed things greatly and before the final reorganization, the two Groups which made up Strike Command were:

- No. 1 Group RAF – the "Air Combat Group"
- No. 2 Group RAF – the "Air Combat Support Group"

Component groups of Strike Command included:

- No. 1 Group RAF 1 April 1968 – 1 April 2007
- No. 2 Group RAF 1 April 1993 – 1 April 1996, 7 January 2000 – 1 April 2007
- No. 3 Group RAF 1 April 2000 – 1 April 2006
- No. 11 Group RAF 1 April 1968 – 1 April 1996
- No. 18 Group RAF 28 November 1969 – 1 April 1996
- No. 11/18 Group RAF 1 April 1996 – 7 January 2000
- No. 38 Group RAF 1 July 1972 – 17 November 1983
- No. 46 Group RAF 1 September 1972 – 1 January 1976
- No. 90 Group RAF 1 January 1969 – 1 September 1972
- Royal Observer Corps 1 April 1968 – 31 December 1995

== Air Officer Commanding-in-Chief ==
Air Officers Commanding-in-Chief included:

- Air Chief Marshal Sir Wallace Kyle 1968–1968
- Air Chief Marshal Sir Denis Spotswood 1968–1971
- Air Chief Marshal Sir Andrew Humphrey 1971–1974
- Air Chief Marshal Sir Denis Smallwood 1974–1976
- Air Chief Marshal Sir Nigel Maynard 1976–1977
- Air Chief Marshal Sir David Evans 1977–1980
- Air Chief Marshal Sir Keith Williamson 1980–1982
- Air Chief Marshal Sir David Craig 1982–1985
- Air Chief Marshal Sir Peter Harding 1985–1988
- Air Chief Marshal Sir Patrick Hine 1988–1991
- Air Chief Marshal Sir Michael Graydon 1991–1992
- Air Chief Marshal Sir John Thomson 1992–1994
- Air Chief Marshal Sir Richard Johns 1994
- Air Chief Marshal Sir William Wratten 1994–1997
- Air Chief Marshal Sir John Allison 1997–1999
- Air Chief Marshal Sir Peter Squire 1999–2000
- Air Chief Marshal Sir Anthony Bagnall 2000–2001
- Air Chief Marshal Sir John Day 2001–2003
- Air Chief Marshal Sir Brian Burridge 2003–2006
- Air Chief Marshal Sir Joe French 2006–2007

== Deputy Air Officer Commanding-in-Chief ==
- Air Marshal Sir Nigel Maynard 1972–1973
- Air Marshal Sir Peter Horsley 1973–1975
- Air Marshal Sir Michael Beetham 1975–1976
- Air Marshal Sir John Stacey 1976–1977
- Air Marshal Sir Alan Davies 1977
- Air Marshal Sir Alfred Ball 1977–1978
- Air Marshal Sir Robert Freer 1978–1979
- Air Marshal Sir Thomas Kennedy 1979–1981
- Air Marshal Sir Peter Bairsto 1981–1984
- Air Marshal Sir Joseph Gilbert 1984–1986
- Air Marshal Sir Brendan Jackson 1986–1988
- Air Marshal Sir Kenneth Hayr 1988–1989
- Air Marshal Sir John Kemball 1989–1993
- Air Marshal Sir Richard Johns 1993–1994
- Air Marshal Sir John Allison 1994–1996
- Air Marshal Graeme Robertson 1996–1998
- Air Marshal Sir Timothy Jenner 1998–2000
- Air Marshal Sir Jock Stirrup 2000–2002
- Air Marshal Sir Brian Burridge 2002–2003
- Air Marshal Sir Glenn Torpy 2003–2004
- Air Marshal Sir Clive Loader 2004–2007

== See also ==
- List of Royal Air Force commands

Preceded by Bomber Command; From 30 April 1968	Strike Command; 1968–2007	Succeeded by Air Command
Preceded by Fighter Command; From 30 April 1968	Strike Command; 1968–2007	Succeeded by Air Command
Preceded by Signals Command; From 1 January 1969	Strike Command; 1968–2007	Succeeded by Air Command
Preceded by Coastal Command; From 28 November 1969	Strike Command; 1968–2007	Succeeded by Air Command
Preceded by Air Support Command; From 1 September 1972	Strike Command; 1968–2007	Succeeded by Air Command
Preceded by RAF Germany; From 1 April 1993	Strike Command; 1968–2007	Succeeded by Air Command
