= Thomas Prickett =

Royal Air Force Air Chief Marshal (1913-2010)

Air Chief Marshal Sir Thomas Prickett KCB DSO DFC
- Born: Thomas Öther Prickett; 31 July 1913; Lindfield, Sussex
- Died: 23 January 2010 (aged 96)
- Military career
- Allegiance: United Kingdom
- Branch: Royal Air Force
- Service years: 1937–70
- Rank: Air Chief Marshal
- Commands: Air Member for Supply and Organisation (1968–70); Air Support Command (1967–68); Transport Command (1967); British Forces Cyprus (1964–66); Near East Air Force (1964–66); RAF Jever (1954–56); RAF Tangmere (1949–50)
- Conflicts: Second World War; Suez Crisis
- Awards: Knight Commander of the Order of the Bath; Distinguished Service Order; Distinguished Flying Cross

Air Chief Marshal Sir Thomas Öther Prickett, KCB, DSO, DFC (31 July 1913 – 23 January 2010) was a Royal Air Force bomber pilot in the Second World War and a senior commander in the 1950s and 1960s. He was chief of staff to the air commander, Air Marshal Denis Barnett, for Operation Musketeer (the Anglo-French-Israeli plan for the invasion of Egypt to capture the Suez Canal during the Suez Crisis).

== RAF career ==
Educated at Haileybury, Prickett initially worked on sugar estates in India before deciding to join the Royal Air Force in 1937. He served in the Second World War initially as a pilot with No. 148 Squadron flying Wellington bombers and latterly as a flight commander with No. 103 Squadron flying Lancaster bombers. He was awarded the Distinguished Service Order following a very successful bombing raid on the Peenemünde Army Research Center.

After the war he was made Station Commander at RAF Tangmere before joining the Air Staff at Headquarters Middle East Air Force in 1951 and then becoming Station Commander at RAF Jever in Germany in 1954. With the Suez Crisis unfolding in autumn 1956, he was appointed Chief of Staff for Operation Musketeer. The planning for the operation was undertaken in great secrecy over a three-month period in a basement office at the Air Ministry.

Returning to the UK he became Director of Air Staff Briefing at the Air Ministry in December 1956, Director of Policy at the Air Ministry early in 1958 and then Senior Air Staff Officer at Headquarters No. 1 Group in May 1958. He went on to be Assistant Chief of the Air Staff (Operations) in 1960, Assistant Chief of the Air Staff (Policy & Planning) in 1963 and Air Officer Commanding-in-Chief Near East Air Force (including responsibility for British Forces Cyprus and Administration of the Sovereign Base Areas) in 1964. He was knighted KCB in the 1965 Birthday Honours. His final appointments were as Air Officer Commanding-in-Chief Transport Command (subsequently renamed Support Command) in 1967 and as Air Member for Supply and Organisation in 1968 before he retired in 1970.

In retirement he assisted the Duke of Richmond to redevelop the Goodwood estate.

== Family ==
In 1942 he married Betty, an American woman; they had a son and a daughter. Following the death of his first wife, he married Shirley Westerman in 1985; she died in 2023.

Military offices
Unknown	Station Commander RAF Tangmere; 1949–1952	Succeeded by J A Kent
Preceded by G Powell-Shedden	Station Commander RAF Jever; 1954–1955	Succeeded by Rochford Hughes
Preceded by Sir Denis Barnett	Air Officer Commanding-in-Chief Near East Air Force; Commander British Forces Cyprus; 1964–1966	Succeeded by Sir Edward Gordon Jones
Preceded by Sir Kenneth Cross	Air Officer Commanding-in-Chief RAF Transport Command; 1967	Command renamed Air Support Command
Command formed by renaming RAF Transport Command	Air Officer Commanding-in-Chief Air Support Command; 1967–1968	Succeeded by Sir Lewis Hodges
Preceded by Sir Charles Broughton	Air Member for Supply and Organisation; 1968–1970	Succeeded by Sir Neil Wheeler
