= Douglas Lowe (RAF officer) =

Royal Air Force Air Chief Marshal (1922-2018)

Sir Douglas Charles Lowe
- Born: 14 March 1922
- Died: 24 January 2018 (aged 95)
- Military career
- Allegiance: United Kingdom
- Branch: Royal Air Force
- Service years: 1940–1983
- Rank: Air Chief Marshal
- Commands: Controller Aircraft (1975–82); No. 18 Group (1973–75); RAF Cranwell (1963–65)
- Conflicts: Second World War
- Awards: Knight Grand Cross of the Order of the Bath; Distinguished Flying Cross; Air Force Cross; Mentioned in Despatches

Air Chief Marshal Sir Douglas Charles Lowe, GCB, DFC, AFC (14 March 1922 – 24 January 2018) was a Second World War pilot and a senior commander in the Royal Air Force (RAF) in the 1970s and early 1980s.

== Family ==
Douglas Charles Lowe was born on 14 March 1922. He married Doreen Elizabeth Nichols the daughter of Ralph Henry Nichols. Their only daughter, Frances Elizabeth Lowe, married Christopher Russell Bailey, the 5th Baron Glanusk.

== RAF career ==
Lowe enlisted in the Royal Air Force Volunteer Reserve (RAFVR) in 1940, and trained in the United States under the Arnold Scheme at Americus, Georgia. He returned to England and flew as a pilot during the Second World War. As a sergeant, he was granted an emergency commission in the RAFVR as a probationary pilot officer on 4 January 1943. He was promoted to probationary flying officer on 1 July 1943.

As an acting flight lieutenant with No.75 (N.Z.) Squadron, Lowe was awarded the Distinguished Flying Cross on 9 July 1943. He was confirmed in his rank of flying officer on 23 December 1943, and received a mention in despatches in January 1945. Lowe was promoted to flight lieutenant (war-substantive) on 1 January 1945. In the 1946 Birthday Honours, Lowe was decorated with the Air Force Cross. He remained in the RAF post-war, being awarded a permanent commission in the rank of flying officer on 1 July 1946, with a subsequent promotion to flight lieutenant on 4 July.

Lowe was promoted to squadron leader on 1 July 1952.

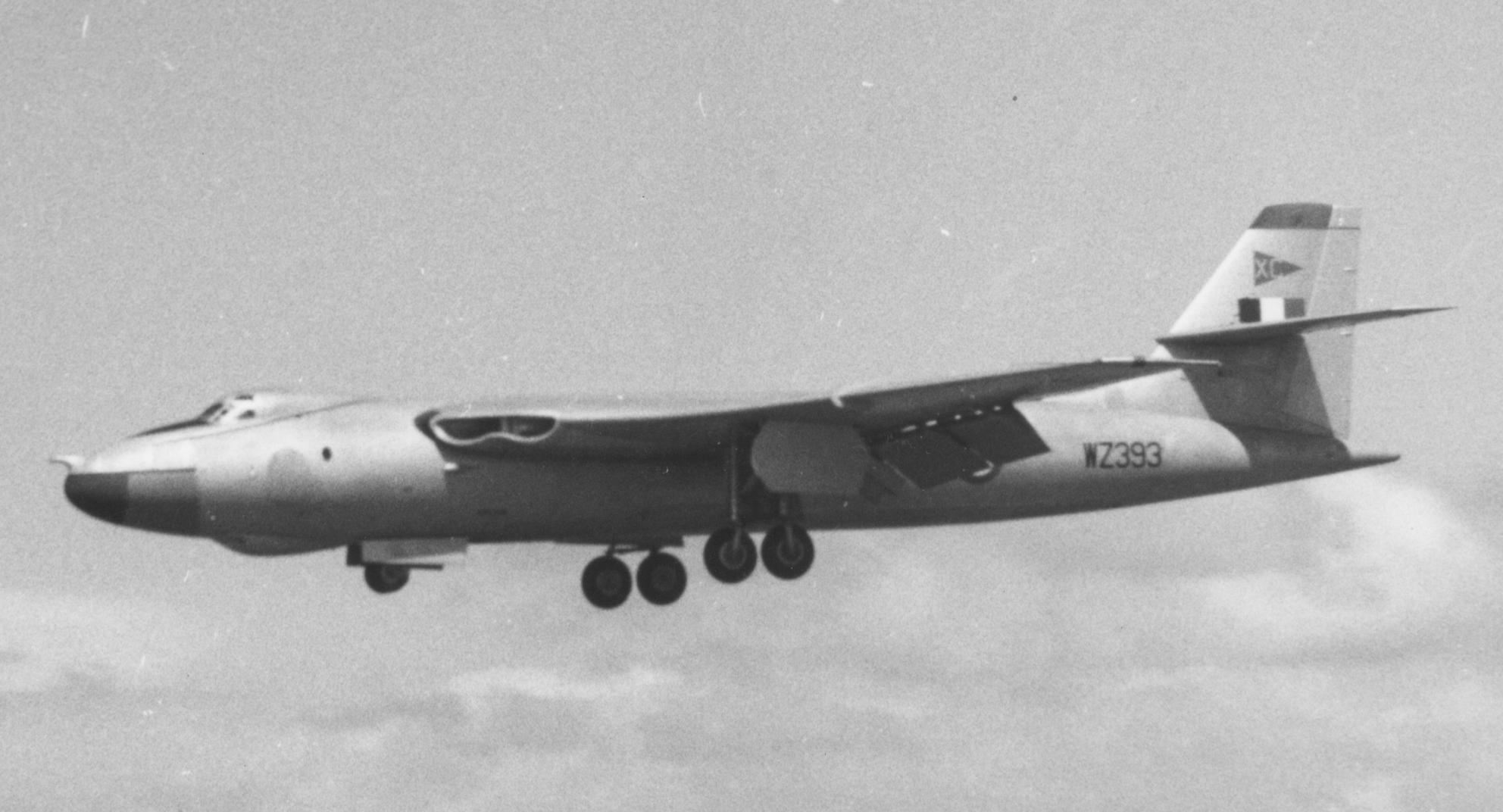
Vickers Valiant 1957

On 1 January 1958 he was promoted to wing commander to command the Vickers Valiants of 148 Squadron at RAF Marham in Norfolk, part of the British V-Force which was NATO's deterrent to the build-up of the Warsaw Pact nations led by the Soviet Union.

Promoted to group captain on 1 July 1962, he served as Station Commander at RAF Cranwell from November 1963 to 1965. With his promotion to air commodore on 1 July 1966, he attained air officer rank. He was promoted to air vice marshal on 1 January 1970 and appointed a Companion of the Order of the Bath in the 1971 Birthday Honours.

In 1973 Lowe was appointed Air Officer Commanding No. 18 Group and he continued in this post until 1975. Thereafter, he was promoted to air chief marshal and was appointed the Controller of Aircraft: he remained in that post until late 1982. Lowe was the Chief of Defence Procurement at the Ministry of Defence from 1982 to 1983. He retired on 22 August 1983.

== Later life ==
Lowe died on 24 January 2018 at the age of 95.

Military offices
Preceded by R G Knott	Senior Air Staff Officer Near East Air Force; 1969–1971	Succeeded by Robert Freer
Preceded by Michael Giddings	Assistant Chief of the Air Staff (Operational Requirements); 1971–1973	Succeeded by D Bower
Preceded by Sir Anthony Heward	Air Officer Commanding No. 18 Group; 1973–1975	Succeeded by Sir Robert Freer
Preceded by Sir Neil Wheeler	Controller Aircraft; 1975–1982	Succeeded by Sir John Rogers
Preceded by Sir David Cardwell	Chief of Defence Procurement; 1982–1983	Succeeded by Sir David Perry
