= John Davis (RAF officer) =

Royal Air Force Air Chief Marshal (1911-1989)

Sir John Davis
- Air Chief Marshal Sir John Davis
- Born: 24 March 1911; Whitby, North Riding of Yorkshire
- Died: 3 February 1989 (aged 77)
- Military career
- Allegiance: United Kingdom
- Branch: Royal Air Force
- Service years: 1933–69
- Rank: Air chief marshal
- Commands: RAF Training Command (1968–69); RAF Flying Training Command (1966–67); Air Member for Supply and Organisation (1963–66); RAF Malta (1961–63); No. 1 Group (1959–61); RAF Topcliffe (1953–55); RAF St Eval (1945); RAF Lagens (1944–45); No. 269 Squadron (1942–43)
- Conflicts: World War II
- Awards: Knight Grand Cross of the Order of the Bath; Officer of the Order of the British Empire; Knight of the Order of St John; Mentioned in dispatches
- Other work: Lieutenant Governor of Jersey

Air chief marshal Sir John Gilbert Davis, GCB, OBE, KStJ (24 March 1911 – 3 February 1989) was a Royal Air Force officer who served as Air Officer Commanding-in-Chief RAF Training Command from 1968 to 1969.

== RAF career ==
Davis joined the Royal Air Force in 1933. He became a pilot and then attended specialist training in navigation before being appointed a Navigation Staff Officer at Headquarters RAF Training Command in 1939. He served in the Second World War, initially on secondment to the Turkish Air Force and then as Officer Commanding No. 269 Squadron.

After the war he attended RAF Staff College and then joined the directing staff there. He was appointed Group Captain, Air Plans at Headquarters Middle East Air Force in 1951, Station Commander at RAF Topcliffe in 1953 and Director of Plans at the Air Ministry in 1955. He went on to be Senior Air Staff Officer at Headquarters RAF Bomber Command in 1958, Air Officer Commanding No. 1 Group in 1959 and Air Officer Commanding RAF Malta in 1961. His last appointments were as Air Member for Supply and Organisation in 1963, Air Officer Commanding-in-Chief at RAF Flying Training Command in 1966 and Air Officer Commanding-in-Chief at RAF Training Command in 1968 before retiring in 1969.

In retirement he became Lieutenant Governor of Jersey.

Military offices
New title	Air Officer Commanding-in-Chief Training Command; 1968–1969	Succeeded by Sir Leslie Mavor
Preceded by Sir Patrick Dunn	Air Officer Commanding-in-Chief Flying Training Command; 1966–1968	Command disbanded
Preceded by Sir John Baker-Carr (acting)	Air Member for Supply and Organisation; 1963–1966	Succeeded by Sir Charles Broughton
Preceded by Augustus Walker	Air Officer Commanding No. 1 Group; 1959–1961	Succeeded by Patrick Dunn
Government offices
Preceded by Sir Michael Villiers	Lieutenant Governor of Jersey; 1969–1974	Succeeded by Sir Desmond Fitzpatrick
