= Donald Hardman =

Royal Australian Air Force chief (1899–1982)

Sir Donald Hardman
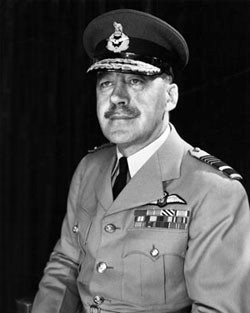
- Air Marshal Hardman as RAAF Chief of the Air Staff
- Born: 21 February 1899; Oldham, Lancashire, England
- Died: 2 March 1982 (aged 83); Estoril, Portugal
- Military career
- Allegiance: United Kingdom
- Service/branch: Royal Air Force
- Service years: 1916–58
- Rank: Air Chief Marshal
- Units: No. 19 Squadron (1918); No. 31 Squadron (1922–26); No. 16 Squadron (1926–28); No. 22 Group (1928–31, 1940); No. 216 Squadron (1931–34); No. 23 Group (1936–37)
- Commands: No. 232 Group (1945–46); RAF Staff College, Bracknell (1949–51); RAF Home Command (1951–52); Royal Australian Air Force (1952–54)
- Conflicts: World War I; Western Front; World War II; European theatre; South East Asian theatre; Burma campaign
- Awards: Knight Grand Cross of the Order of the British Empire; Knight Commander of the Order of the Bath; Distinguished Flying Cross; Mentioned in Despatches; Bronze Star (US)

Air Chief Marshal Sir James Donald Innes Hardman, GBE, KCB, DFC (21 February 1899 – 2 March 1982), known as Donald Hardman, was a senior Royal Air Force commander. He began his flying career as a fighter pilot in World War I, achieving nine victories to become an ace. During World War II, Hardman held senior staff and operational posts. He was Chief of the Air Staff (CAS) of the Royal Australian Air Force (RAAF) from 1952 to 1954, after which he served as a member of the British Air Council until retiring in 1958.

Born in Lancashire, Hardman joined the Royal Flying Corps in 1917 and was posted to the Western Front the following year. He flew Sopwith Dolphins with No. 19 Squadron, earning the Distinguished Flying Cross for his fighting skills. Between the wars he served with No. 31 Squadron in India and No. 216 Squadron in Egypt. A wing commander at the outbreak of World War II, Hardman was attached to the Air Ministry for several years before being posted in 1944 to South East Asia, where he commanded No. 232 (Transport) Group during the Burma campaign. He was appointed an Officer of the Order of the British Empire in 1940 and a Companion of the Order of the Bath in 1945, and was also mentioned in despatches.

Finishing the war an air commodore, Hardman served successively as Assistant Chief of the Air Staff, Commandant of RAF Staff College, Bracknell, and Air Officer Commanding-in-Chief of Home Command, before becoming RAAF CAS in January 1952. He was appointed a Knight Commander of the Order of the Bath the same year. As CAS he was responsible for reorganising the RAAF's geographically based command-and-control system into a functional structure. Returning to Britain, he became Air Member for Supply and Organisation in May 1954, and was promoted to air chief marshal the following year. He was raised to Knight Grand Cross of the Order of the British Empire in January 1958, shortly before his retirement.

== Early life and World War I ==
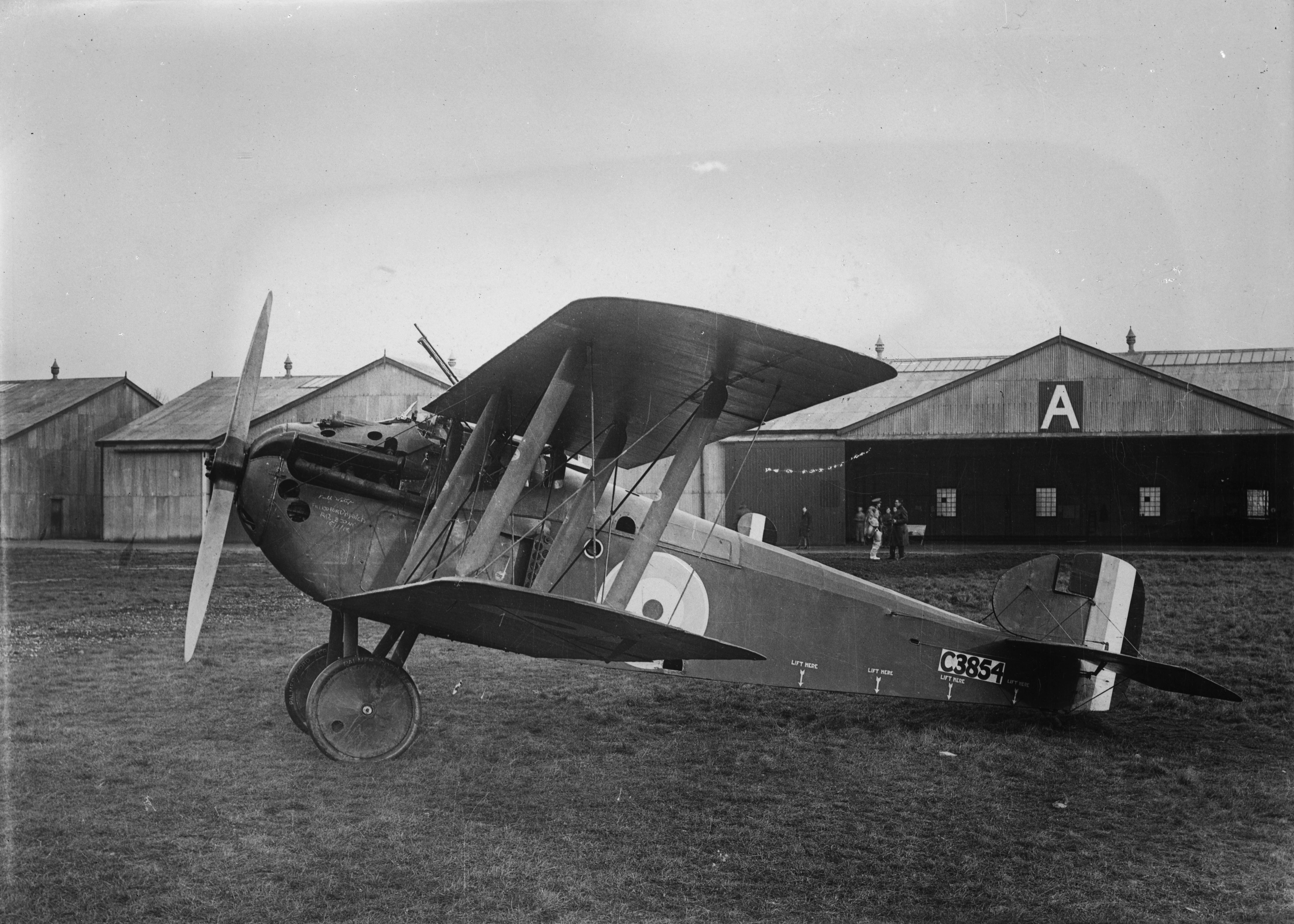
Sopwith Dolphin fighter

Born on 21 February 1899 in Oldham, Lancashire, James Donald Innes Hardman was the son of a master cotton-spinner, also named James, and his wife Wilhelmina Innes. The younger James, known as Donald, attended Malvern College. Hardman began his military career in 1916 as a seventeen-year-old private in the Artists Rifles—part of the London Regiment—and joined the Royal Flying Corps (RFC) early the following year. He was commissioned a temporary second lieutenant on 10 May 1917 and confirmed in his rank on 21 July.

Prevented initially from seeing combat because of his youth, Hardman was eventually posted to No. 19 Squadron on the Western Front in February 1918, just as the unit was completing its conversion from SPAD S.VIIs to Sopwith Dolphins. He achieved his first aerial victory in May 1918. On 28 September, Hardman was promoted from lieutenant to temporary captain, and appointed as one of No. 19 Squadron's flight commanders. He scored two victories in one sortie on 30 October 1918, when he led twelve Dolphins escorting DH.9 bombers of No. 98 Squadron to Mons; in a dogfight that resulted in the loss of ten British aircraft, Hardman sent two German Fokker D.VIIs down in flames. His "cool judgment and skill in leading" during this action earned him the Distinguished Flying Cross; the award was promulgated on 11 February 1919. Hardman's final wartime tally was nine victories. The life expectancy of even an experienced RFC pilot on the Western Front was as little as three weeks; years later, Hardman admitted that he was still surprised he had survived.

== Inter-war years ==
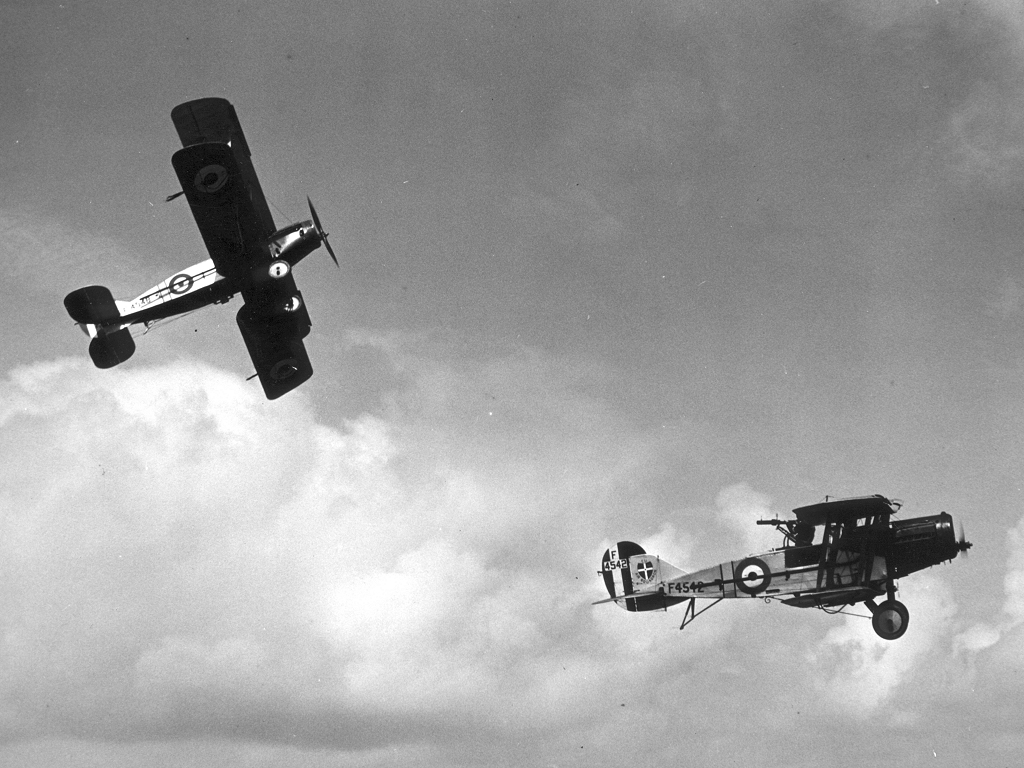
Bristol Fighters, operated by Nos. 31 and 16 Squadrons between the wars

Hardman's commission was terminated on 8 March 1919; the following year he commenced an economics degree at Hertford College, Oxford. On 18 October 1921, he joined the Royal Air Force (RAF) with a short-service commission as a flying officer, and was posted to India's North-West Frontier in 1922. He served with No. 31 Squadron, an army cooperation unit that flew Bristol Fighters during the Waziristan campaign. Hardman's commission was made permanent on 30 September 1925. Returning to Britain, he joined No. 16 Squadron, which operated Bristol Fighters out of Old Sarum, in September 1926. Hardman was promoted to flight lieutenant on 1 July 1927, and attended the Armament and Gunnery School, Eastchurch, in 1928. He was then posted to the headquarters staff of No. 22 (Army Co-operation) Group, South Farnborough.

On 8 July 1930, Hardman married Dorothy Ursula Ashcroft Thompson at St George's, Hanover Square, in London; the couple had two sons and a daughter. In September 1931, he was posted to Heliopolis, Egypt, to serve with No. 216 Squadron. Tasked with bombing and transport duties, the squadron operated Vickers Victorias and pioneered the air route from Lagos to Khartoum in 1934. Returning to Britain, Hardman entered the RAF Staff College, Andover, in January 1935. He was promoted to squadron leader on 1 February 1936. Hardman served for the next two years as Staff Officer for Armament at No. 23 (Training) Group in Grantham. He entered the British Army's Staff College, Camberley, in January 1938, and was promoted to wing commander on 1 January 1939.

== World War II ==
On first meeting the then Air Commodore in his headquarters in Comilla one was immediately aware of an exceptionally dignified bearing, a considerable presence, great humour; there was much leg-pulling and light-hearted banter, the whole atmosphere was very much at ease. Yet one also obtained a remarkably strong impression of "No nonsense"; it was made quite clear that there was a tough job ahead.

— Marshal of the Royal Air Force Sir John Grandy, on serving under Hardman at Combat Cargo Task Force, 1944–45

At the onset of World War II, Hardman was sent to France with the RAF element of the British Expeditionary Force. After the Fall of France in 1940, he served on the headquarters staff of No. 22 Group and was liaison officer with the British Army's Eastern Command, before taking charge of the Directorate of Military Co-operation—later the Directorate of Operations (Tactical)—at the Air Ministry. He was appointed an Officer of the Order of the British Empire on 11 July 1940 for "distinguished services rendered in recent operations", and mentioned in despatches on 1 January 1941. On 1 March 1941, he was promoted temporary group captain.

Hardman was promoted temporary air commodore on 1 October 1944, and substantive group captain on 1 December. He was assigned to Air Command South East Asia (ACSEA) as the deputy commander—and RAF component commander—of the Combat Cargo Task Force (CCTF). Comprising RAF, Royal Canadian Air Force, and United States Army Air Forces elements, CCTF was responsible for supplying the Fourteenth Army in Burma. Hardman's final wartime posting, commencing in February 1945, was as Air Officer Commanding No. 232 (Transport) Group in Comilla, India (now Bangladesh). The group comprised the squadrons that formerly made up the RAF component of CCTF. Hardman described the Burma campaign as "a striking illustration of a fact new in warfare—namely that air power can be used to transport, supply and support ground troops entirely independent of ground channels. This has been South-East Asia's contribution to the art of war." He was appointed a Companion of the Order of the Bath on 5 July 1945 for "gallant and distinguished services in connection with the operations in Burma". The US government awarded him the Bronze Star; permission to wear the decoration was gazetted on 15 March 1946.

== Post-war career ==
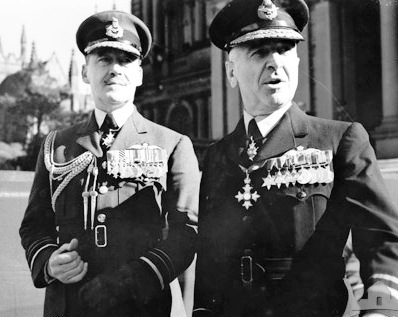
Air Marshal Hardman (left) as RAAF Chief of the Air Staff, with Air Vice-Marshal John McCauley, viewing a parade by No. 78 Wing shortly before its departure for garrison duties in Malta, July 1952

Hardman was promoted to acting air vice-marshal on 1 October 1945. He remained in South-East Asia following the cessation of hostilities, taking over as Air Officer in Charge of Administration for ACSEA (later Air Command Far East) in January 1946. After his return to Britain he was appointed to several senior posts in the RAF including, successively, Assistant Chief of the Air Staff (Operations) in May 1947, Commandant of RAF Staff College, Bracknell, in January 1949, and Air Officer Commanding-in-Chief of Home Command in September 1951. Hardman's wartime rank of air commodore became substantive on 1 October 1946, and this was followed by substantive promotion to air vice-marshal on 1 July 1948. He was raised to acting air marshal on 1 October 1951.

On 14 January 1952, Hardman was appointed Chief of the Air Staff (CAS) of the Royal Australian Air Force (RAAF), succeeding Air Marshal George Jones, who had served ten years in the position. The decision by Australia's Prime Minister, Robert Menzies, to appoint an RAF officer caused resentment in the RAAF. This was compounded when Menzies stated his reason as being that there was "no RAAF officer of sufficient age, or operational experience, to take the post of Chief of the Air Staff", which appeared to ignore the wartime records of such figures as John McCauley and Frederick Scherger. The Daily Mirror in Sydney was one of several media outlets to voice a "stern protest" over the matter. Menzies also felt he could justify the appointment of an outsider on the grounds that the RAAF's geographically based command-and-control system needed reorganisation along functional lines, a system with which a senior RAF member would be familiar. Britain's CAS, Marshal of the Royal Air Force Sir John Slessor, was, somewhat reluctantly, responsible for fulfilling the Australian Government's request for a suitable officer. In putting forward Hardman as the "outstanding candidate" for the Australian post, Slessor tried to avoid what he called "the follies of some years ago", referring to Air Chief Marshal Sir Charles Burnett's controversial tenure as CAS on secondment from the RAF early in World War II.

Hardman made two major changes to the structure of the Air Force to streamline command and control: integrating RAAF Headquarters, Melbourne, with the Department of Air, and supplanting the geographical area commands with three functional organisations, namely Home (operational), Training, and Maintenance Commands. The functional command system has been described by historian Alan Stephens as Hardman's "major legacy to the RAAF". While doing away with the area command structure that had been favoured by Jones, Hardman carried on his predecessor's support for the local aircraft industry. He also formed a policy agreement with the Chief of the Naval Staff, Vice Admiral Sir John Collins, covering joint responsibility and cooperation for maritime warfare. During Hardman's term as CAS, No. 78 (Fighter) Wing was re-equipped with RAF de Havilland Vampire jet fighters to garrison Malta and support British operations in the Mediterranean. He was appointed a Knight Commander of the Order of the Bath in the Queen's Birthday Honours promulgated on 5 June 1952, and raised to substantive air marshal on 1 July.

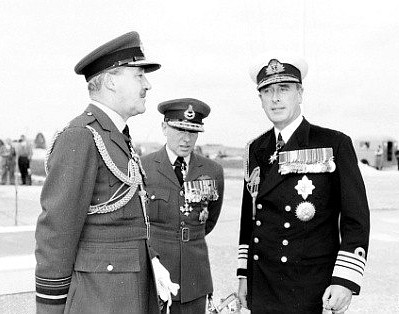
Hardman (left) as RAF Air Member for Supply and Organisation, with Air Marshal Sir Claude Pelly (centre), and Lord Mountbatten (right) at a ceremonial parade for No. 78 Wing RAAF on its departure from garrison duty in Malta, December 1954

As a protege of Slessor, Hardman proclaimed: "An air force without bombers isn't an air force." He maintained that the only way to attain "true and enduring air superiority" was by attacking the enemy's vital centres, which included its means of producing fighters. He recommended that the RAAF purchase one of Britain's nuclear-capable "V bombers"—the Vickers Valiant, Handley Page Victor, or Avro Vulcan—though this never eventuated, and Australia's jet bomber remained the English Electric Canberra until the long-delayed introduction of the General Dynamics F-111C in 1973. Towards the end of his tenure as CAS, Hardman gave an interview in which he criticised Army and Navy operations against a backdrop of continuing interservice rivalry for the defence budget. He was quoted as saying: "The Air Force in this country, for either defence or offence, is the only force worth while. It can be sent anywhere in the world to the point where it can do most good and be rapidly switched to any other point." In contrast to the initial disquiet at his appointment, upon his departure from Australia Hardman was described by The Age as "the outstanding CAS in the RAAF's history", a "brilliant organiser", and a "master of the theory of air power". He was succeeded by McCauley on 18 January 1954.

Hardman returned to Britain on the SS Himalaya, and joined the British Air Council as Air Member for Supply and Organisation on 1 May 1954, succeeding Air Chief Marshal Sir John Whitworth-Jones. In December, he represented the Air Council at No. 78 Wing's farewell parade in Malta, reminding the personnel gathered that he had been present at the wing's march through Sydney in July 1952, prior to its departure for the Mediterranean. He was promoted to air chief marshal on 1 April 1955. In July 1956, he presented a Squadron Standard to his old unit, No. 19 Squadron. That October, he presided over the inquiry into the fatal crash of Vulcan XA897 at Heathrow Airport after its maiden round-the-world flight, the only survivors of the six crew members being the pilot and Air Marshal Sir Harry Broadhurst. Hardman was succeeded as Air Member for Supply and Organisation by Air Chief Marshal Sir Walter Dawson on 1 January 1958, and was raised to Knight Grand Cross of the Order of the British Empire the same day. He retired from the RAF on 29 January.

== Later life ==
Hardman joined the board of New Electronic Products Ltd in May 1959. In February 1963, he succeeded Air Chief Marshal Sir Douglas Evill as the RAF Benevolent Fund's honorary county representative for Hampshire. Hardman died on 2 March 1982, while holidaying in Estoril, Portugal, and was survived by his wife and children. His grave lies in the churchyard of St John's Church, Farley Chamberlayne, Hampshire.

== Notes ==
Military offices
| Preceded by Thomas Williams | Commandant of the RAF Staff College, Bracknell; 1949–1951 | Succeeded by Peter Gillmore |
| Preceded by Sir George Jones | Chief of the Air Staff (RAAF); 1952–1954 | Succeeded by Sir John McCauley |
| Preceded by Sir John Whitworth-Jones | Air Member for Supply and Organisation; 1954–1957 | Succeeded by Sir Walter Dawson |
