= Peter Wykeham =

Royal Air Force Air Marshal (1915–1995)

Sir Peter Guy Wykeham
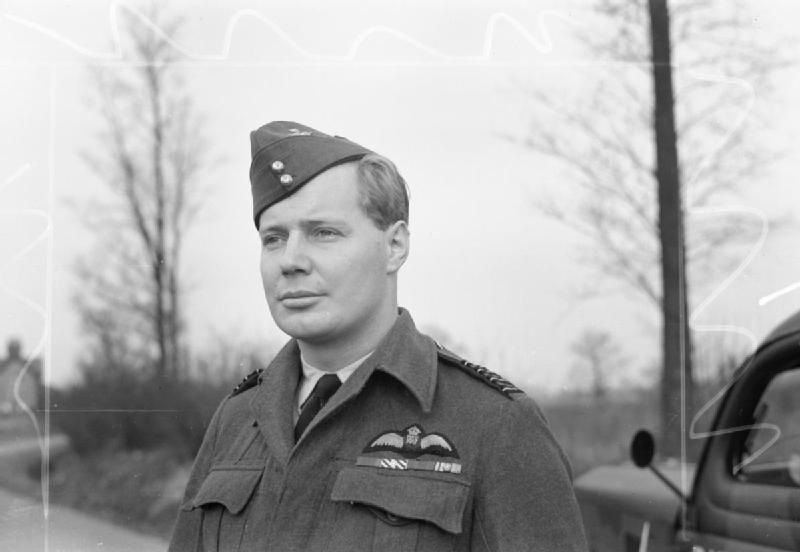
- Group Captain P. G. Wykeham-Barnes c. 1944
- Born: 13 September 1915
- Died: 23 February 1995 (aged 79)
- Military career
- Allegiance: United Kingdom
- Branch: Royal Air Force
- Service years: 1932–1969
- Rank: Air Marshal
- Commands: Deputy Chief of the Air Staff (1967–69); Far East Air Force (1964–67); No. 38 Group RAF (1960–62); RAF Wattisham (1952–53); RAF North Weald (1951–52); No. 140 Wing RAF (1944); No. 23 Squadron RAF (1942–43); No. 257 Squadron RAF (1942); No. 73 Squadron RAF (1941)
- Conflicts: Second World War; North African campaign; European theatre; Italian campaign; Korean War
- Awards: Knight Commander of the Order of the Bath; Distinguished Service Order & Bar; Officer of the Order of the British Empire; Distinguished Flying Cross & Bar; Air Force Cross; Mentioned in Despatches (3); Air Medal (United States); Commander of the Order of the Dannebrog (Denmark)

Air Marshal Sir Peter Guy Wykeham, KCB, DSO & Bar, OBE, DFC & Bar, AFC (born Wykeham-Barnes; 13 September 1915 – 23 February 1995) was a Royal Air Force fighter pilot and squadron commander, and a flying ace of the Second World War. He was credited with 14 and 3 shared aerial victories.

== RAF career ==
Wykeham-Barnes joined the Royal Air Force as an apprentice in 1932. He served in the Second World War as a Flight Commander with No. 274 Squadron and as Officer Commanding No. 73 Squadron before commanding the fighters at Headquarters Desert Air Force. He continued his war service as Officer Commanding No. 257 Squadron and then as Officer Commanding No. 23 Squadron before becoming Sector Commander at RAF Kenley and then commanding No. 140 Wing.

Remaining in the RAF after the War, Wykeham-Barnes was employed as a test pilot before serving with the USAF Fifth Air Force in the Korean War. On his return to Great Britain, Wykeham-Barnes served as station commander at RAF North Weald and then RAF Wattisham before becoming Assistant Chief of Staff (Operations) at Headquarters Allied Air Forces Central Europe in 1953. He went on to join the Air Staff (Operations) at Headquarters RAF Fighter Command in 1956 and became Director of Fighter & Theatre Air Force Operations in 1958. He served as Air Officer Commanding No. 38 Group from 1960, the Director of the Joint Warfare Staff from 1962, the Commander of the Far East Air Force from 1964 and the Deputy Chief of the Air Staff from 1967 before retiring in 1969.

== Published works ==
Wykeham is the author of a history of Fighter Command (Fighter Command. A Study of Air Defence 1914–1960) published in 1960 and a biography of Alberto Santos-Dumont, published in 1962.

== Family ==
In 1949 Wykeham married Barbara Priestley; they had two sons and one daughter.

Military offices
Preceded by Sir Hector McGregor	Commander-in-Chief Far East Air Force; 1964–1966	Succeeded by Sir Rochford Hughes
Preceded by Sir Reginald Emson	Deputy Chief of the Air Staff; 1967–1969	Post disbanded
