= Inspector-General of the RAF =

The Inspector-General of the RAF was a senior appointment in the Royal Air Force, responsible for the inspection of airfields. The post existed from 1918 to 1920 and from 1935 until the late 1960s. For much of World War II, a second inspector-general post existed.

The first creation of the post began on 22 August 1918 as a member of the Air Council. However, in February or March of the following year, the Inspector-General ceased to sit on the Air Council.

== Inspectors-general ==
The following people served as Inspector-General of the RAF:

- 22 August 1918 Major General Sir Godfrey Paine (Air Vice-Marshal from 1 August 1919)
- 1920 to 1935 - Post Abolished
- 1 August 1935 Air Chief Marshal Sir Robert Brooke-Popham
- 1 September 1937 Marshal of the Royal Air Force Sir Edward Ellington
- 1 July 1939 Air Chief Marshal Sir Charles Burnett
- 15 January 1940 Air Marshal Sir Leslie Gossage
- 14 April 1940 Air Chief Marshal Sir Edgar Ludlow-Hewitt

From May 1940 to November 1943, a second inspector-general was appointed in addition to Ludlow-Hewitt who continued to serve. The additional inspectors-general were

- 24 May 1940 Air Marshal Sir William Mitchell
- 1 June 1941 Air Chief Marshal Sir Arthur Longmore
- 1943 Air Chief Marshal Sir Philip Joubert de la Ferté

After November 1943, Ludlow-Hewitt remained as the only inspector-general until he handed over to Sir Arthur Barratt in October 1945.

- 29 October 1945 Air Chief Marshal Sir Arthur Barratt
- 17 January 1947 Air Chief Marshal Sir Norman Bottomley
- 1 January 1948 Air Chief Marshal Sir George Pirie
- 1 September 1948 Air Chief Marshal Sir Leslie Hollinghurst
- 30 September 1949 Air Chief Marshal Sir Hugh Saunders
- 9 February 1951 Air Chief Marshal Sir James Robb
- 1 October 1951 Air Marshal Sir Thomas Williams
- 1 October 1952 Air Marshal Sir Stephen Strafford
- 19 April 1954 Air Marshal Sir Charles Guest
- 31 July 1956 Air Chief Marshal Sir Walter Dawson
- 1 January 1958 Air Marshal Sir Gilbert Nicholetts
- 3 June 1959 Air Marshal Sir John Whitley
- 1 June 1962 Air Marshal Sir Paterson Fraser
- 15 August 1964 Air Chief Marshal Sir Augustus Walker
- 17 February 1967 Air Marshal Sir Reginald Emson
