= Neil Wheeler =

British RAF Air Chief Marshal (1917–2009)

Sir Neil Wheeler
- Born: 8 July 1917; Pretoria, South Africa
- Died: 9 January 2009 (aged 91)
- Relatives: Major General Norman Wheeler (brother); General Sir Roger Wheeler (nephew)
- Military career
- Allegiance: United Kingdom
- Branch: Royal Air Force
- Service years: 1935–1976
- Rank: Air Chief Marshal
- Commands: Air Member for Supply and Organisation (1970–73); Far East Air Force (1969–70); RAF Laarbruch (1959–61); RAF Kuala Lumpur (1948–49); No. 236 Squadron (1942–43)
- Conflicts: Second World War; Malayan Emergency
- Awards: Knight Grand Cross of the Order of the Bath; Commander of the Order of the British Empire; Distinguished Service Order; Distinguished Flying Cross & Bar; Air Force Cross
- Other work: Director of Rolls-Royce (1977–82); Director of Flight Refuelling (Holdings)

Air Chief Marshal Sir Henry Neil George Wheeler, GCB, CBE, DSO, DFC & Bar, AFC (8 July 1917 – 9 January 2009) was a senior Royal Air Force (RAF) officer.

== Military career ==
Educated St Helen's College in Southsea and the Royal Air Force College Cranwell, Wheeler was commissioned into the RAF in 1935. He served with Bomber Command from 1937 and then spent part of the Second World War as Officer Commanding No. 236 Squadron in Fighter Command before going to the RAF Staff College and US Army Staff College in 1943.

After the war he joined the Directing Staff at the RAF Staff College and then transferred to the Far East Air Force in 1947. He was posted to the Directing Staff at the Joint Services Staff College in 1949 and to Bomber Command in 1951 before going to the Air Ministry in 1953. He was appointed Assistant Commandant at the RAF College in 1957 and Officer Commanding RAF Laarbruch in 1959. He attended the Imperial Defence College in 1961 and then served in the Ministry of Defence from 1961. He became Senior Air Staff Officer at Headquarters RAF Germany (2 Tactical Air Force) in 1963 and Assistant Chief of Defence Staff (Operational Requirements) in 1966. He was made Deputy Chief of the Defence Staff (Operational Requirements) in 1967 and Commander of the Far East Air Force in 1969. He was Air Member for Supply and Organisation at the Ministry of Defence from 1970 and then Controller of Aircraft at the Procurement Executive from 1973.

In retirement he became a Director of Rolls-Royce Limited.

== Family ==
In 1942 he married Elizabeth Weightman and then went on to have two sons and a daughter. He was the younger brother of Major General Norman Wheeler, and uncle of General Sir Roger Wheeler.

Military offices
New post	Deputy Chief of the Defence Staff (Operational Requirements); 1967–1968	Succeeded by Sir Noel Thomas
Preceded by Sir Rochford Hughes	Commander-in-Chief Far East Air Force; 1969–1970	Succeeded by Nigel Maynard
Preceded by Sir Thomas Prickett	Air Member for Supply and Organisation; 1970–1973	Succeeded by Sir Anthony Heward
Preceded by Sir Peter Fletcher	Controller Aircraft; 1973–1975	Succeeded by Sir Douglas Lowe
