= Controller Aircraft =

British Ministry of Defence appointment

Controller Aircraft (CA), originally Controller of Aircraft, is a senior (3 star) British Ministry of Defence appointment who is responsible for delivering an airworthy aircraft to the Services, whereupon the Service issues a Release to Service (RTS), releasing the aircraft into service. The difference between CA Release and RTS is normally one of Build Standard. Although usually held by a Royal Air Force officer, several civil servants have held the post in the 20th century. The incumbent is a member of the Air Force Board.

== History ==
Prior to 1953, the equivalent responsibilities were held by Controller of Supplies (Air). In 1971 the post was moved from the Ministry of Technology to the Ministry of Defence's Procurement Executive.

== Controllers ==
The following officers have held the post:

- 9 November 1953 Air Chief Marshal Sir John Baker
- 1956 Air Chief Marshal Sir Claude Pelly
- 1959 Sir George Gardner
- 1963 Morien Morgan
- 1967 Air Marshal Sir Christopher Hartley
- 1 September 1970 Air Marshal Sir Peter Fletcher
- 1 June 1973 Air Chief Marshal Sir Neil Wheeler
- 8 November 1975 Air Chief Marshal Sir Douglas Lowe
- 1982 David Howard Perry
- 1 January 1983 Air Chief Marshal Sir John Rogers
- 20 January 1986 Air Marshal Sir David Harcourt-Smith
- 1989 Sir Donald Spiers
- 1994 Air Marshal Sir Roger Austin
- 1997 Air Marshal Sir Peter Norriss
- 2000 Air Vice-Marshal B M Thornton
- 2003 Air Vice-Marshal D N Williams
- April 2004 Air Vice-Marshal S G G Dalton
- 20 April 2006 Air Vice-Marshal S D Butler
