= Patrick Hine =

Royal Air Force Air Chief Marshal

Air Chief Marshal Sir Patrick Hine GCB GBE
- Born: 14 July 1932 (age 94); Southampton, England
- Military career
- Allegiance: United Kingdom
- Branch: Royal Air Force
- Service years: 1953–91
- Rank: Air Chief Marshal
- Nickname: Paddy
- Commands: Joint Commander British Forces Gulf War (1991); Strike Command (1988–91); Air Member for Supply and Organisation (1987–88); Vice-Chief of the Defence Staff (1985–87); RAF Germany (1983–85)
- Conflicts: Falklands War; Gulf War
- Awards: Knight Grand Cross of the Order of the Bath; Knight Grand Cross of the Order of the British Empire; Queen's Commendation for Valuable Service in the Air

Sir Patrick Bardon Hine (born 14 July 1932) is a former senior Royal Air Force commander. Most notably, he was joint commander of all British forces during the Gulf War.

== RAF career ==
Hine was born near Southampton on 14 July 1932. He was educated at Peter Symonds School in Winchester. He entered the RAF on a National Service commission as an acting pilot officer on probation on 22 March 1951, and was regraded as a pilot officer on 6 February 1952. He was commissioned as a pilot officer on 14 October 1952 (seniority from 6 February 1952), and promoted to flying officer on 20 March 1953. He was appointed to a permanent commission in the RAF on 1 October 1953, in the rank of flying officer.

As a junior officer, Hine flew the Gloster Meteor and then the Hawker Hunter. He was promoted to flight lieutenant on 20 September 1956. From 1957 to 1959 he performed on the Black Arrows, then the RAF's aerobatics display team, which included being part of the team that performed a world record 22-plane loop at Farnborough in 1958. He was awarded the Queen's Commendation for Valuable Service in the Air in the 1960 Birthday Honours List. He was promoted to squadron leader on 1 July 1962 and appointed Officer Commanding No. 92 Squadron. On 1 January 1968, he was promoted to wing commander, and was promoted to group captain on 1 January 1972.

On 1 July 1975, he was promoted to air commodore and was appointed Director of Public Relations for the RAF. He was made Senior Air Staff Officer at HQ RAF Germany in 1979. He was promoted to air vice-marshal on 1 January 1980 and was appointed Assistant Chief of the Air Staff (Policy) at the Ministry of Defence the next year. He became Commander of the Second Tactical Air Force and Commander-in-Chief of RAF Germany in 1983. Promoted to acting air marshal by June 1983, he was knighted with a Knight Commander of the Order of the Bath in the 1983 Birthday Honours List.

Promoted to air chief marshal on 1 July 1985, he became Vice-Chief of the Defence Staff that year. In late 1987 he was appointed Air Member for Supply and Organisation.

Hine was appointed Air Officer Commanding-in-Chief Strike Command in 1988. He was promoted to a Knight Grand Cross of the Order of the Bath in the 1989 New Year Honours List.

He was Joint Commander of all British forces during the Gulf War. He was appointed a Knight Grand Cross of the Order of the British Empire in the 1991 Birthday Honours List.

Hine retired from the RAF in 1991 and subsequently became a military advisor to British Aerospace from which he retired in April 1999. Two years earlier, in 1997, Hine was made the King of Arms of the Order of the British Empire, making him the herald to the Order of the British Empire.

=== Golf career ===
In 1995, Hine became a member of The Royal and Ancient Golf Club of St Andrews. In May 2010, he was nominated to be the Captain of the Royal and Ancient for the year 2010–11.

Hine's home course is Brokenhurst Manor Golf Club in Hampshire where he is the Club President. He also had a prolific amateur golfing career and won the Carris Trophy (England U18 Stroke Play Championship) and the Brabazon Trophy (England Amateur Stoke Play Champion) in 1949. He also won the Hampshire County Championship in that year. In addition, Hine represented England in the England–Scotland boys match in 1948 and 1949.

== Personal life ==
Hine and his wife, Jill, have three sons.

== Awards and honors ==
- In 1991, Hine was appointed a Knight Grand Cross of the Order of the British Empire at that year's Birthday Honours List.

== Amateur wins ==
- 1949 Carris Trophy, Hampshire County Championship, Brabazon Trophy

== Team appearances ==
- England–Scotland boys match (representing England): 1948 (winners), 1949

Military offices
Preceded by Sir Thomas Kennedy	Commander-in-Chief RAF Germany; Also Commander of the Second Tactical Air Force; 1983–1985	Succeeded by Sir David Parry-Evans
Preceded by Sir Peter Harding	Vice-Chief of the Defence Staff; 1985–1987	Succeeded by Sir Richard Vincent
Preceded by Sir Michael Armitage	Air Member for Supply and Organisation; 1987–1988	Succeeded by Sir Brendan Jackson
Preceded by Sir Peter Harding	Commander-in-Chief Strike Command; 1988–1991	Succeeded by Sir Michael Graydon
Heraldic offices
Preceded by Sir Anthony Morton	King of Arms of the Order of the British Empire; 1997–2011	Succeeded by Sir Peter Abbott
