= Reginald Emson =

Royal Air Force commander

Sir Reginald Emson
- Born: 11 January 1912
- Died: 27 March 1995 (aged 83)
- Military career
- Allegiance: United Kingdom
- Branch: Royal Air Force
- Service years: 1930–1969
- Rank: Air Marshal
- Commands: Inspector-General of the RAF (1967–69); Deputy Chief of the Air Staff (1966–67)
- Conflicts: Second World War
- Awards: Knight Commander of the Order of the British Empire; Companion of the Order of the Bath; Air Force Cross; Mentioned in Despatches

Air Marshal Sir Reginald Herbert Embleton Emson, KBE, CB, AFC (11 January 1912 – 27 March 1995) was a senior commander in the Royal Air Force in the post-Second World War years.

== Education ==
Emson attended Christ's Hospital.

== RAF career ==
Emson joined the Royal Air Force in 1930. He became an Armament Officer in 1936 and served in the Second World War in the Technical Branch. After the war he became Assistant Chief of the Air Staff (Operational Requirements) and then Deputy Chief of the Air Staff from 1966 before becoming Inspector-General of the RAF in 1967, and retiring in 1969.

Military offices
Preceded by Sir Christopher Hartley	Deputy Chief of the Air Staff; 1966–1967	Succeeded by Sir Peter Wykeham
Preceded by Sir Augustus Walker	Inspector-General of the RAF; 1967–1969	Post disbanded
