= Walter Dawson (RAF officer) =

Royal Air Force air marshal

Sir Walter Dawson
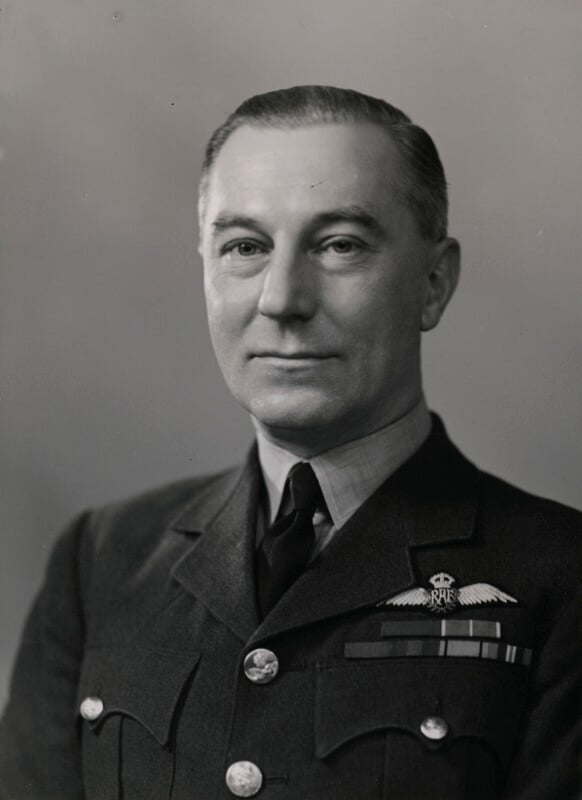
- Dawson in 1950
- Born: 6 May 1902
- Died: 10 June 1994 (aged 92)
- Military career
- Allegiance: United Kingdom
- Branch: Royal Air Force
- Service years: 1919–60
- Rank: Air chief marshal
- Commands: Air Member for Supply and Organisation (1958–60); Inspector-General of the RAF (1956–57); School of Land/Air Warfare (1948–49); AHQ Levant (1946–48); RAF St Eval (1942–43)
- Conflicts: World War II
- Awards: Knight Commander of the Order of the Bath; Commander of the Order of the British Empire; Distinguished Service Order

Air chief marshal Sir Walter Lloyd Dawson, KCB, CBE, DSO (6 May 1902 – 10 June 1994) was a senior commander in the Royal Air Force in the 1950s. He was the last RAF commander in Palestine, before the creation of the State of Israel.

== RAF career ==
Dawson joined the Royal Air Force as a boy mechanic in 1919. He served in the Second World War on the air staff at RAF Middle East and then in the Directorate of Plans at the Air Ministry. He continued his war service as Station Commander at RAF St Eval from 1942, Director of Operations (Naval Co-operation) from 1943 and Director of Plans from 1944. After the war he was made Air Officer Commanding AHQ Levant at a difficult time when the State of Israel was being established. He was appointed Commandant of the School of Land/Air Warfare in 1948 and then served as Senior RAF Instructor at the Imperial Defence College from 1950 before becoming Assistant Chief of the Air Staff (Policy) in 1952. He went on to be Deputy Chief of Staff for Plans & Policy at Headquarters Supreme Headquarters Allied Powers Europe in 1953, Inspector-General of the RAF in 1956 and Air Member for Supply and Organisation in 1958 before he retired in 1960.

He died on 10 June 1994. Dawson's Field in Jordan, where the Dawson's Field hijackings took place, is named after him.

Military offices
Preceded by Hector McGregor	Air Officer Commanding Air Headquarters Levant; 1946–1948	Vacant Title next held by Clayton Boyce; In 1955, headquartered in Iraq
Preceded by Sir Leslie Brown	Commandant of the School of Land/Air Warfare; 1948–1949	Succeeded by Lawrence Pendred
Preceded by Ronald Ivelaw-Chapman	Senior RAF Instructor at the Imperial Defence College; 1950–1951	Succeeded by Claude Pelly
Preceded by Sir Charles Guest	Inspector-General of the RAF; 1956–1957	Succeeded by Sir Gilbert Nicholetts
Preceded by Sir Donald Hardman	Air Member for Supply and Organisation; 1958–1960	Succeeded by Sir Walter Merton
