= Air Council =

Governing body of the Royal Air Force from 1917 to 1964

Agency overview
- Formed: 1917
- Preceding agency: Air Committee
- Dissolved: 1964
- Superseding agency: Air Force Board
- Jurisdiction: Government of the United Kingdom
- Headquarters: Whitehall; London
- Parent agency: Air Ministry, Ministry of Defence

Air Council (or Air Force Council) was the governing body of the Royal Air Force until the merger of the Air Ministry with the other armed forces ministries to form the Ministry of Defence in 1964. It was succeeded by the Air Force Board.

== Members of the council ==
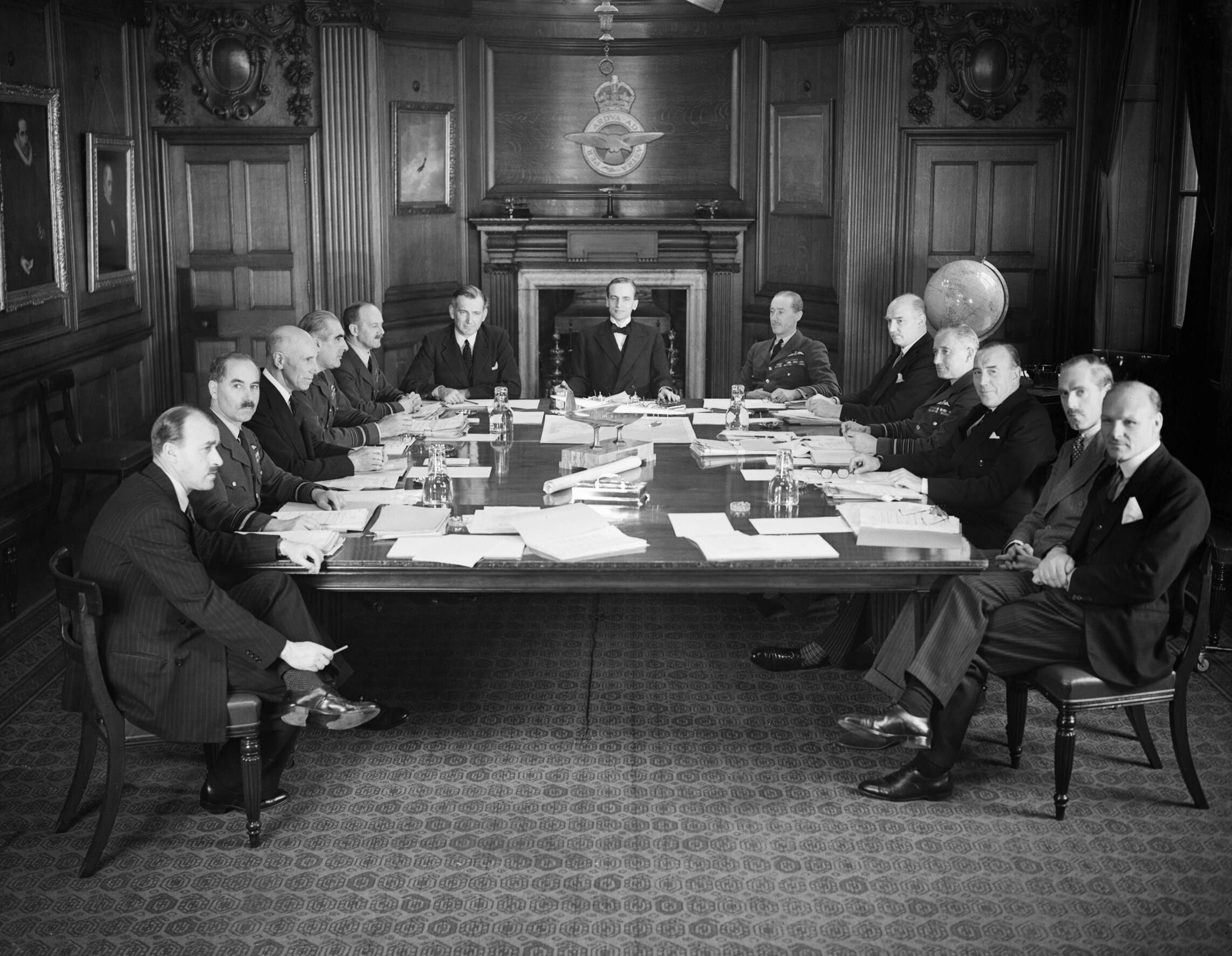
The Air Council in session at Adastral House, London, during World War II

The Air Council was made up of several posts, the names of which changed over time. These included:

- President of the Air Council (1917–1919)
- President – Secretary of State for Air (1919–1964)
- Vice-President of the Air Council – originally held by Lt-Gen Sir David Henderson, who resigned from post; it ceased after that date (1917–1918)
- Under-Secretary of State for Air (1919–1964)
- Chief of the Air Staff (1918–1964)
- Deputy Chief of the Air Staff (1930–1964)
- Vice Chief of the Air Staff (1940–1964)
- Air Member for Research and Development, renamed Air Member for Development and Production
- Air Member for Supply and Research (1923–1930)
- Air Member for Supply and Organisation (1930–1964)
- Air Member for Training
- Air Member for Technical Services (1947–1951)
- Controller of Research and Development – from the Ministry of Air Production (MAP)
- Director-General of Aircraft Production and Research
- Director-General of Supply and Research
- Inspector General of the RAF (1918–1919)
- Master-General of Personnel

== See also ==
- Army Council
- Navy Board
- Air Board (Australia)
- Air Board (Canada)
