= Charles Guest =

Royal Air Force Air Marshal (1900–1977)

Sir Charles Guest
- Born: 4 October 1900
- Died: 23 June 1977 (aged 76)
- Military career
- Allegiance: United Kingdom
- Branch: Royal Air Force
- Service years: 1918–56
- Rank: Air Marshal
- Commands: Inspector-General of the RAF (1954–56); Transport Command (1952–54); No. 1 Group (1947–48); No. 229 Group (1943–45); No. 12 Squadron (1936–37)
- Conflicts: Second World War
- Awards: Knight Commander of the Order of the British Empire; Companion of the Order of the Bath; Mentioned in Despatches (2)

Air Marshal Sir Charles Edward Neville Guest, KBE, CB (4 October 1900 – 23 June 1977) was a Royal Air Force officer who became Air Officer Commanding-in-Chief at RAF Transport Command from 1952 to 1954.

== RAF career ==
Educated at King Edward's School, Birmingham, Guest joined the Royal Air Force in 1918. He became a test pilot before being appointed Officer Commanding No. 12 Squadron in 1936 and being seconded to the British Military Mission in Egypt the following year. He served in the Second World War as Senior Air Staff Officer at Headquarters No. 202 Group and then at No. 204 Group before becoming deputy director of Organisation at the Air Ministry in 1942. He became Air Officer Commanding No. 229 Group in 1943 and Air Officer Commanding Transport at South East Asia Command in 1945.

After the War he was appointed Senior Air Staff Officer at Headquarters Air Command South East Asia and then Air Officer Commanding No. 1 Group in 1947. He went on to be Assistant Chief of the Air Staff (Operations) in 1948, Air Officer Commanding-in-Chief at RAF Transport Command in 1952 and Inspector-General of the RAF in 1954 before retiring in 1956.

In retirement he became an aeronautical advisor to the Minister of Transport and a member of the Air Safety Board. He also became Vice President of the Old Edwardians.

Military offices
Preceded by Robert Blucke	Commander-in-Chief Transport Command; 1952–1954	Succeeded by Sir George Beamish
Preceded by Stephen Strafford	Inspector-General of the RAF; 1954–1956	Succeeded by Sir Walter Dawson
