= Thomas Williams (RAF officer) =

Royal Air Force Air Marshal (1899-1956)

Sir Thomas Williams
- Born: 27 September 1899; Dalton, Lancashire
- Died: 10 June 1956 (aged 56); Ashford, Kent
- Spouse: Patricia Williams
- Military career
- Allegiance: United Kingdom
- Branch: British Army (1916–18); Royal Air Force (1918–53)
- Service years: 1916–53
- Rank: Air Marshal
- Commands: Inspector-General of the RAF (1951–52); British Air Forces of Occupation (1948–51); RAF Staff College, Bracknell (1947–48); AHQ Bengal (1943); RAF Watton (1940–41); RAF Andover (1938–39); No. 423 (Fleet Spotter) Flight (1924, 1927–29); No. 406 (Fleet Fighter) Flight (1924–25, 1926–27)
- Conflicts: First World War; Russian Civil War; Second World War
- Awards: Knight Commander of the Order of the Bath; Officer of the Order of the British Empire; Military Cross; Distinguished Flying Cross & Bar; Mentioned in Despatches (2); Distinguished Service Medal (United States); Commander of the Legion of Merit (United States); Air Medal (United States)

Air Marshal Sir Thomas Melling Williams, KCB, OBE, MC, DFC & Bar (27 September 1899 – 10 June 1956) was an ace pilot in the Royal Flying Corps during the First World War, scoring nine aerial victories, and a senior officer in the Royal Air Force during the Second World War and the following years.

== Military career ==
Williams was commissioned into the 12th South African Infantry and was in action in German West Africa in 1916 and 1917. He transferred into the Royal Flying Corps in 1917. After training as a pilot, Williams was assigned to No. 65 Squadron in France, flying Sopwith Camels. He achieved nine air victories, and was awarded the Military Cross for his "conspicuous gallantry and devotion to duty" during operations in 1918 in which "he destroyed three enemy aircraft and drove down two out of control." This was followed by the award of the Distinguished Flying Cross (DFC) later that year. The citation for the latter was published in a supplement to the London Gazette of 2 November 1918, reading:

During recent operations this officer rendered most gallant and valuable service, proving himself to be a very capable and inspiring leader. On one occasion, observing three enemy railway trains, he dived, and in face of very heavy machine-gun fire seriously damaged one by a direct hit with a bomb. He then descended almost to the ground, and attacked the personnel escaping from the ruined train, scattering them in all directions. On returning to his aerodrome his machine was found to be riddled with bullets.

By the end of the war in 1918 Williams was a flight commander, a role he continued when he was assigned to the British force in North Russia, supporting anti-Bolshevik forces for which he was awarded a Bar to his DFC. After the war he commanded No. 423 Flight and then No. 406 Flight of the Fleet Air Arm. He was appointed Station Commander at RAF Andover in 1938 and served in the Second World War being one of the last RAF officers to escape from France to Britain in 1940, leaving from Brest with his Air Officer Commanding. He continued his war service as Station Commander at RAF Watton from 1940, as Senior Air Staff Officer at Headquarters No. 2 Group from 1941 and then as Senior Air Staff Officer at Headquarters RAF Bomber Command from later that year. After serving in the Far East and in India, Williams was appointed Air Officer Commanding the AHQ Bengal in 1943. He became Deputy Commander at Headquarters Eastern Air Command at Air Command South East Asia in December 1943 and Assistant Chief of the Air Staff (Operations) in August 1944.

After the war he became Commandant of the RAF Staff College, Bracknell and then Air Officer Commanding-in-Chief British Air Forces of Occupation before becoming Inspector-General of the RAF in 1951. Williams' air force career was cut short by ill-health and he died in June 1956.

Military offices
Preceded by Arthur Sauders	Commandant of the RAF Staff College, Bracknell; 1947–1948	Succeeded by Donald Hardman
Preceded by Sir Philip Wigglesworth	Commander-in-Chief British Air Forces of Occupation; 1948–1951	Succeeded by Sir Robert Foster; As C-in-C Second Tactical Air Force
Preceded by Sir James Robb	Inspector-General of the RAF; 1951–1952	Succeeded by Stephen Strafford
