= David Rennison =

- Military career
- Allegiance: United Kingdom
- Branch: Royal Air Force
- Service years: 1970–2007
- Rank: Air Vice Marshal
- Commands: Air Member for Logistics (2006–07)
- Awards: Companion of the Order of the Bath

Air Vice Marshal David Ralph Grey Rennison, CB is a former senior Royal Air Force officer.

== RAF career ==
Rennison joined the Royal Air Force in 1970. He was appointed Director of the Defence Information Infrastructure (DII) Programme in 2003, and Director-General Logistics (Strike) in 2006 before he retired in 2007.

Military offices
Preceded by Barry Thornton	Air Member for Logistics; 2006–2007	Succeeded by Sir Barry Thornton; As Chief of Materiel (Air)
