= Joseph Gilbert (RAF officer) =

Royal Air Force Air Chief Marshal

Sir Joseph Gilbert
- Born: 15 June 1931 (age 95)
- Military career
- Allegiance: United Kingdom
- Branch: Royal Air Force
- Service years: 1952–89
- Rank: Air Chief Marshal
- Commands: No. 38 Group; RAF Coltishall; No. 92 Squadron
- Awards: Knight Commander of the Order of the Bath; Commander of the Order of the British Empire

Air Chief Marshal Sir Joseph Alfred Gilbert, KCB, CBE (born 15 June 1931) is a former Royal Air Force officer who served as deputy commander of Strike Command from 1984 to 1986.

== RAF career ==
Educated at William Hulme's Grammar School and the University of Leeds, Gilbert joined the Royal Air Force under a National Service Commission in 1952. Gilbert served in fighter squadrons until 1961 when he joined the Air Secretary's Department. He attended RAF Staff College in 1964 and became commanding officer of No. 92 Squadron flying Lightnings from RAF Geilenkirchen in 1965. He attended Joint Services Staff College in 1968. He then joined the Defence Policy Staff, becoming Assistant Director of Defence Policy before he left. In 1971 he became Station Commander at RAF Coltishall before attending the Royal College of Defence Studies in 1974.

He was appointed Director of Forward Policy in January 1975, Assistant Chief of the Air Staff (Policy) in November 1975, Air Officer Commanding No. 38 Group in 1977 and Assistant Chief of Defence Staff (Policy) in 1980. He then became Deputy Air Officer Commanding of Strike Command in 1984 and, having been promoted to air chief marshal, he went on to be Deputy Commander-in-Chief Allied Forces Northern Europe in 1986 before retiring in 1989.

He was made an honorary graduate (LLD) of the University of Leeds in 1989. He is also a life vice-president of the Royal Air Forces Association and was Vice-Chairman of the Commonwealth War Graves Commission from 1993 to 1998 and the Prime Minister's trustee of the Imperial War Museum from 1997 to 2002.

Military offices
Preceded by Sir Peter Bairsto	Deputy Commander-in-Chief Strike Command; 1984–1986	Succeeded by Sir Brendan Jackson
Preceded by Sir Michael Beavis	Deputy Commander-in-Chief Allied Forces Central Europe; 1986–1989	Succeeded by Sir Anthony Skingsley
