= Donald Spiers =

British aeronautical engineer

Sir Donald Maurice Spiers, CB TD CEng FREng Hon FRAeS (born 27 January 1934) is a British retired aeronautical engineer and administrator. He held a variety of posts in the Ministry of Defence (MOD) and, after leaving the public sector, in private aviation companies. His roles included Controller Aircraft at the MOD and President of the Royal Aeronautical Society.

== Early life ==
Born in Wimbledon, south west London, Spiers was educated at Raynes Park County Grammar School and Trinity College, Cambridge, where he read Mechanical Sciences.

== Career ==
After graduating, he served an apprenticeship with the de Havilland Engine Company. In 1960 he joined the Air Ministry, (from 1964 a part of the Ministry of Defence), as a civil service senior scientific officer. Here he worked on operational research, including service in Radfan in Arabia and scientific evaluation trials of the new Hawker Kestrel in 1965.

From 1967 to 1970 he was Scientific Adviser to the Far East Air Force, based in Singapore. Returning to England, he held a number of posts, including senior involvement in the projects for the Hawk, Jaguar and Eurofighter Typhoon aircraft programmes. He served as Deputy Controller Aircraft (1984–86), and then Controller Aircraft (1989–94), responsible for the procurement of all aerospace materiel for UK Armed Forces.

Spiers retired from the civil service in 1994, after which he was president of the Royal Aeronautical Society (1995–96). Between 1998 and 2010 he served on the boards of a number of aviation companies, including Meggitt plc; Messier-Dowty International; TAG Aviation (UK); General Dynamics UK and AgustaWestland International. He was chairman of the Farnborough Aerospace Consortium (2003–20) and president of the Popular Flying Association (1997–2000). Spiers became a trustee of the Farnborough Air Sciences Trust museum in 2015.

=== Military service ===
After National Service in the Royal Engineers, during which he was posted to Egypt with the 16th Parachute Brigade, Spiers served in the Territorial Army, joining in 1954. He attained the rank of acting major and in 1966 received the Territorial Decoration for 12 years service.

=== Autobiography ===
In 2023 Spiers published an autobiography titled The Way it Was: The story of the life and times of Donald Spiers and his family from 1810 to the present day.

== Awards and honours ==
Spiers was awarded the Territorial Decoration in 1966, was made a Companion of the Order of the Bath in 1987 and knighted in 1993. In 1989 he was awarded the Royal Aeronautical Society Gold Medal.
