= David Perry (civil servant) =

English civil servant and engineer (1931–2025)

Sir David Howard Perry, KCB, FRAeS (13 April 1931 – 17 August 2025) was an English civil servant and engineer. Educated at Pembroke College, Cambridge, he became a chartered engineer and entered the Royal Aircraft Establishment in 1954, eventually becoming head of the Dynamics Division (1971–73) and the Systems Assessment Department (1975–77). Moving to the Ministry of Defence in 1978, he was the Controller of Aircraft in 1982, Chief of Defence Procurement from 1983 to 1985 and Chief of Defence Equipment Collaboration from 1985 to 1987. Perry died on 17 August 2025, aged 94.
