= Brendan Jackson =

Royal Air Force Air Chief Marshal (1935-1998)

Sir Brendan Jackson
- Born: 23 August 1935; London, England
- Died: 19 November 1998 (aged 63); Shouldham Thorpe, England
- Military career
- Allegiance: United Kingdom
- Branch: Royal Air Force
- Service years: 1956–93
- Rank: Air Chief Marshal
- Commands: Air Member for Supply and Organisation (1988–93); RAF Marham (1977–79); No. 13 Squadron (1967–69)
- Awards: Knight Grand Cross of the Order of the Bath

Air Chief Marshal Sir Brendan James Jackson, GCB (23 August 1935 – 19 November 1998) was a Royal Air Force officer who became Deputy Commander of RAF Strike Command.

== Early life ==
He was born on 23 August 1935, Jackson was educated at Chichester High School For Boys and the University of London.

== Career ==
He then joined the Royal Air Force on a national service commission in 1956. As a junior officer, he successfully ejected from a Victor B2 which became uncontrollable during a night training exercise on 20 March 1963 at Barnack. Jackson also became a qualified interpreter.

He was appointed Officer Commanding No. 13 Squadron in 1966 and went on to be Station Commander at RAF Marham in 1977. He was made Director of Air Staff Plans at the Ministry of Defence in 1979 and then Assistant Chief of Staff (Policy) at SHAPE in 1984. He went on to be Chief of Staff and Deputy Commander-in-Chief, Strike Command in 1986 and Air Member for Supply and Organisation in 1988. He wrote a paper entitled "Nuclear Forces – The Ultimate Umbrella" in 1991, in which he wrote that Third World nuclear proliferation was even "more chimerical" than the threat from Russian nuclear weapons. He retired in 1993.

== Family ==
In 1959 he married Shirley Norris; they had one son and one daughter.

Military offices
Preceded by Sir Joseph Gilbert	Deputy Commander-in-Chief Strike Command; 1986–1988	Succeeded by Sir Kenneth Hayr
Preceded by Sir Patrick Hine	Air Member for Supply and Organisation; 1988–1993	Succeeded by Sir Michael Alcock; As Air Member for Logistics
