= Peter Bairsto =

Royal Air Force Air Marshal (1926-2017)

Sir Peter Bairsto
- Born: Peter Edward Bairsto; 3 August 1926
- Died: 24 October 2017 (aged 91)
- Military career
- Allegiance: United Kingdom
- Branch: Royal Navy (1944–45); Royal Air Force (1945–84)
- Service years: 1944–84
- Rank: Air Marshal
- Service number: 202703
- Commands: RAF Honington (1971–1973); Northern Maritime Air Region (1980–1981)
- Conflicts: Second World War
- Awards: Knight Commander of the Order of the British Empire; Companion of the Order of the Bath; Air Force Cross; Queen's Commendation for Valuable Service in the Air (2)

Air Marshal Sir Peter Edward Bairsto, KBE, CB, AFC, DL (3 August 1926 – 24 October 2017) was a Royal Air Force officer who served as Deputy Commander of Strike Command from 1981 until his retirement in 1984.

== Early life ==
Bairsto was born on 3 August 1926. He was educated at Rhyl Grammar School.

== Military career ==
Bairsto joined the Royal Navy in 1944 and transferred to the Royal Air Force in 1945 as a trainee RAF Regiment gunner. He was commissioned into the RAF Regiment with the rank of acting pilot officer (on probation) on 10 May 1946. On 10 November 1946, his commission was confirmed and he was promoted to flying officer (war substantive).

On 17 July 1947, with the end of Second World War active service, he reverted to pilot officer with seniority from 10 May 1946. On 1 November 1947, he was re-promoted to flying officer. He served with the Aden Protectorate Levies in Aden before being posted as aide-de-camp to the Air Officer Commanding-in-Chief Near East Air Force (AOC-in-C NEAF). He transferred to the General Duties Branch, the flying branch comprising navigators and pilots, on 12 December 1951 as a flying officer with seniority from that date. He was promoted to flight lieutenant on 1 August 1953, was awarded the Queen's Commendation for Valuable Service in the Air in the 1955 New Year Honours and an Air Force Cross in the 1957 New Year Honours. In the half-yearly promotions of 1958, on 1 July, he was promoted to squadron leader. In the 1960 Birthday Honours, Bairsto was awarded a further Queen's Commendation for Valuable Service in the Air.

He was promoted to group captain on 1 January 1969, commanded RAF Honington from 1971 to 1973, and was promoted to air commodore on 1 July 1973 in the half-yearly promotions. He became Director of Operational Requirements in 1973, Senior Air Staff Officer at Support Command in 1977 (retitled Air Officer, Training Group at RAF Support Command in 1978) and Commander of the Northern Maritime Air Region in 1980. He went on to be Deputy Commander of Strike Command in 1981, and retired in 1984.

Bairsto was appointed a Knight Commander of the Order of the British Empire (KBE) in the 1981 Birthday Honours.

== Later life ==
In retirement, Bairsto became an advisor to Ferranti Group. He also served as Deputy Lieutenant of Fife. He died on 24 October 2017.

== Personal life ==
In 1947, he married Kathleen Clarbour; they had two sons and one daughter. Following the death of his first wife in 2008, he married Pamela Braid (née Gibson) on 15 May 2010 at Hope Park Parish Church, St Andrews.

By July 1973, he was a Member of the British Institute of Management (MBIM). He was Honorary Colonel of the 79 Engineer Regiment (Volunteers) until 3 August 1992.

Military offices
Preceded by Sir Thomas Kennedy	Deputy Commander-in-Chief Strike Command; 1981–1984	Succeeded by Sir Joseph Gilbert
