= Anthony Heward =

Royal Air Force Air Chief Marshal (1918-1995)

Anthony Wilkinson Heward
- Born: 1 July 1918
- Died: 27 October 1995 (aged 77)
- Military career
- Allegiance: United Kingdom
- Branch: Royal Air Force
- Service years: 1936–76
- Rank: Air chief marshal
- Commands: Air Member for Supply and Organisation (1973–76); No. 18 (Maritime) Group (1972–73); RAF Finningley (1959–62); University of London Air Squadron (c.1952–54); No. 97 Squadron (1944–45); No. 50 Squadron (1944)
- Conflicts: Second World War
- Awards: Knight Commander of the Order of the Bath; Officer of the Order of the British Empire; Distinguished Flying Cross & Bar; Air Force Cross; Mentioned in dispatches

Air Chief Marshal Sir Anthony Wilkinson Heward, KCB, OBE, DFC & Bar, AFC (1 July 1918 – 27 October 1995) was a senior Royal Air Force (RAF) commander.

== RAF career ==
Heward joined the Royal Air Force in 1936. He served in the Second World War as Officer Commanding No. 50 Squadron and then as Officer Commanding No. 97 Squadron before being made Personal Staff Officer to the Air Commander-in-Chief, RAF Mediterranean and Middle East in July 1945.

Promoted to group captain, he was appointed to the Air & Special Operations staff at Headquarters Supreme Headquarters Allied Powers Europe in 1957 and Station Commander at RAF Finningley in 1959. Then after attending the Imperial Defence College in 1962 he was promoted to air commodore and appointed Director of Operations (Bomber & Reconnaissance) at the Ministry of Defence in 1963. Promoted to air vice marshal, he was appointed Deputy Commander of RAF Germany in 1966, Air Officer for Administration at Headquarters RAF Air Support Command in 1969 and Chief of Staff at RAF Strike Command in 1970. Promoted to air marshal, he went on to be Air Officer Commanding No. 18 (Maritime) Group in February 1972 and Air Member for Supply and Organisation in 1973. He was promoted to air chief marshal in 1974 and retired in 1976.

In retirement he became a County councillor for Wiltshire.

== Family ==
In 1944, he married Clare Myfanwy Wainwright, the daughter of Major-General C B Wainwright CB. They had two children.

Military offices
Preceded by Sir Robert Craven	Air Officer Commanding No. 18 Group; 1972–1973	Succeeded by Sir Douglas Lowe
Preceded by Sir Neil Wheeler	Air Member for Supply and Organisation; 1973–1976	Succeeded by Sir Alasdair Steedman
