= John Baker-Carr =

Sir John Baker-Carr
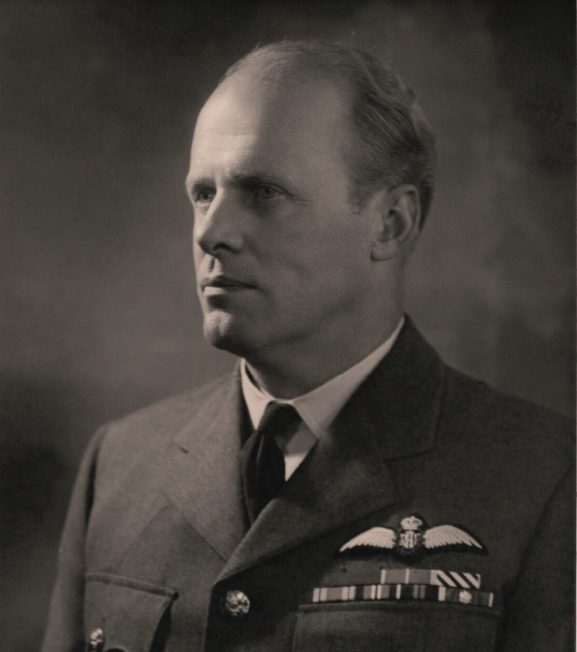
- Air Marshal Sir John D'Arcy Baker-Carr
- Born: 13 January 1906; Hythe, Kent
- Died: 9 July 1998 (aged 92); Winchester, Hampshire
- Military career
- Allegiance: United Kingdom
- Branch: Royal Air Force
- Service years: 1929–64
- Rank: Air marshal
- Commands: Air Member for Supply and Organisation (1963); No. 41 Group (1959–62); RAF St Athan (1953–56)
- Conflicts: Second World War
- Awards: Knight Commander of the Order of the British Empire; Companion of the Order of the Bath; Air Force Cross; Officer of the Legion of Merit (United States)

Air Marshal Sir John Darcy Baker-Carr, KBE, CB, AFC (13 January 1906 – 9 July 1998) was a senior Royal Air Force commander during the early 1960s.

== Origins ==
He was the second son of Brigadier General Christopher D'Arcy Bloomfield Saltren Baker-Carr (1878–1949) and his first wife Sarah de Witt (1880–1969), daughter of William Russell Quinan who was in the explosives business with Kenneth Bingham Quinan (his nephew).

== RAF career ==
Baker-Carr joined the Royal Air Force in 1929. He served in the Second World War in the Technical Branch. After the war he was appointed Deputy Director of Personnel at the Air Ministry and then Station Commander at RAF St Athan from 1953. He went on to be Air Officer Commanding No. 41 Group in 1959 and then acting Air Member for Supply and Organisation in early 1963 before retiring in 1964.

== Family ==
On 30 June 1934 at Hambledon, Hampshire, he married Margery Alexandra (1907–2003), daughter of Major-General Alistair Grant Dallas CB CMG. They had no children.

Military offices
Preceded by Sir Walter Merton	Air Member for Supply and Organisation (acting); 1963	Succeeded by Sir John Davis
