= Norman Wheeler =

British Army general

Major-General Norman Wheeler CB CBE
- Born: 16 June 1915; Worcester, Worcestershire, England
- Died: 21 September 1990 (aged 75); Sudbury, Suffolk, England
- Relatives: General Sir Roger Wheeler (son); Air Chief Marshal Sir Neil Wheeler (brother)
- Military career
- Allegiance: United Kingdom
- Branch: British Army
- Service years: 1935–1971
- Rank: Major-General
- Service number: 66180
- Unit: Royal Ulster Rifles
- Commands: 2nd Division; 39th Infantry Brigade; 1st Battalion Royal Ulster Rifles
- Conflicts: Arab revolt in Palestine; Second World War; Palestine Emergency; EOKA Campaign
- Awards: Companion of the Order of the Bath; Commander of the Order of the British Empire

Major-General Thomas Norman Samuel Wheeler, CB, CBE (16 June 1915 – 21 September 1990) was a British Army officer who commanded the 2nd Division from 1964 to 1966.

== Military career ==
Born in Worcester, Worcestershire, England, on 16 June 1915, the son of Thomas Henry Wheeler, Norman Wheeler was educated at Water Kloof House in South Africa, St Helen's College in Southsea and the Royal Military College, Sandhurst. Wheeler was commissioned as a second lieutenant into the Royal Ulster Rifles of the British Army in 1935. From 1937 to 1939 he served as an intelligence officer with the 2nd Battalion, Royal Ulster Rifles in Palestine during the Arab revolt.

During the Second World War, Wheeler served as adjutant to the regimental depot, and attended the Staff College, Camberley. After serving as a General Staff Officer Grade 3 with the Canadian Corps, he was a brigade major to the 38th (Irish) Brigade before serving with the Special Operations Executive running operations in Albania. He then returned to the 2nd Battalion of his regiment to fight in North West Europe, from shortly after D-Day landings in June 1944 until Victory in Europe Day in May 1945.

After the war Wheeler became assistant adjutant and quartermaster general for the 6th Airborne Division in Palestine during the Palestine Emergency. He was appointed military assistant to Adjutant-General to the Forces in 1949, a member of the UK Services Liaison Staff in Australia in 1951, and a member of the General Staff at Headquarters Northern Army Group in 1954. In 1958 he was made commanding officer of the 1st Battalion the Royal Ulster Rifles and deployed as part of the response to the EOKA campaign in Cyprus. He went on to be commander of the 39th Infantry Brigade at Lisburn in 1959, chief of staff of the I Corps in Germany in 1962, and general officer commanding the 2nd Division in 1964. His last appointments were as chief of staff for Contingencies Planning at Supreme Headquarters Allied Powers Europe from 1966 and as chief of staff at British Army of the Rhine Headquarters from 1969, before retiring in 1971.

In retirement Wheeler became deputy managing director of Associated Independent Stores.

== Family ==
In 1939 Wheeler married Helen Clifford; they had one son and one daughter. He was brother to Air Chief Marshal Sir Neil Wheeler and father of General Sir Roger Wheeler.

Military offices
Preceded by Mervyn Butler	General Officer Commanding 2nd Division; 1964–1966	Succeeded by John Sharp
