= George Pirie (RAF officer) =

Sir George Pirie
- Born: 28 July 1896; Pittenweem, Scotland
- Died: 21 January 1980 (aged 83)
- Military career
- Allegiance: United Kingdom
- Branch: British Army (1914–1918); Royal Air Force (1918–1951)
- Service years: 1914–1951
- Rank: Air Chief Marshal
- Commands: Air Member for Supply and Organisation (1948–1950); Inspector-General of the RAF (1948); Air Command South East Asia (1946–1947); RAF in Northern Ireland (1941); RAF Tangmere (1933–1936); No. 10 Squadron (1929); No. 6 Squadron (1918–1919)
- Conflicts: First World War; Second World War
- Awards: Knight Commander of the Order of the Bath; Knight Commander of the Order of the British Empire; Military Cross; Distinguished Flying Cross; Mentioned in Despatches

Air Chief Marshal Sir George Clark Pirie, KCB, KBE, MC, DFC (28 July 1896 – 21 January 1980) was a senior commander in the Royal Air Force during the Second World War and the immediate post-war years. During the First World War, Pirie served as an infantry officer before transferring to the Royal Flying Corps where he took up duties as an observer officer.

== RAF career ==
Educated at Fettes College in Edinburgh and the University of St Andrews, Pirie volunteered for service with the Cameronians (Scottish Rifles) just after the outbreak of the First World War. He was gazetted as a second lieutenant on 19 September 1914. In March 1916 Pirie began training to be an observer with No. 2 Squadron of the Royal Flying Corps. He became Officer Commanding No. 6 Squadron on the Western Front in 1918. Pirie was still serving with 6 Squadron when it moved to the Middle East and served with the squadron when he was awarded the Distinguished Flying Cross (DFC) for services in Mesopotamia. The citation for his DFC, which was listed in the London Gazette dated 28 October 1921, stated the award was:

"For great gallantry and good work, especially during operations in the relief of Diwaniyah and during our retirement to Hillah. This officer showed remarkable ability in quick initiative when leading his flight during 'operations".

After the war he served as Officer Commanding No. 29 Squadron before becoming Station Commander at RAF Tangmere in 1933. He was made deputy director of Operations at the Air Ministry in 1936 and Air Attaché in Washington D. C. in 1937. He served in the Second World War as Air Officer Commanding the RAF in Northern Ireland and as Air Officer Administration at Headquarters Middle East Command before becoming Director of War Organisation and then Director-General of Organisation at the Air Ministry. He completed his war service as Deputy Air Commander in Chief at Air Command South East Asia in 1945.

After the War he was Air Officer Commanding-in-Chief, Air Command South East Asia and Air Officer Commanding-in-Chief, Air Command Far East before becoming Inspector-General of the RAF in 1948. He was made Air Member for Supply and Organisation in September 1948 and Head of the RAF Staff in Washington D. C. in 1950 before retiring in 1951.

Military offices
| Preceded by Sir Keith Park | Commander-in-Chief Air Command South East Asia; Air Command Far East from 30 September 1946; 1946–1947 | Succeeded by Sir Hugh Lloyd |
| Preceded by Sir Norman Bottomley | Inspector-General of the RAF; January – September 1948 | Succeeded by Sir Leslie Hollinghurst |
| Preceded by Sir Leslie Hollinghurst | Air Member for Supply and Organisation; 1948–1950 | Succeeded by Sir William Dickson |
