= Patrick Dunn (RAF officer) =

Royal Air Force Air Marshal (1912-2004)

Sir Patrick Dunn
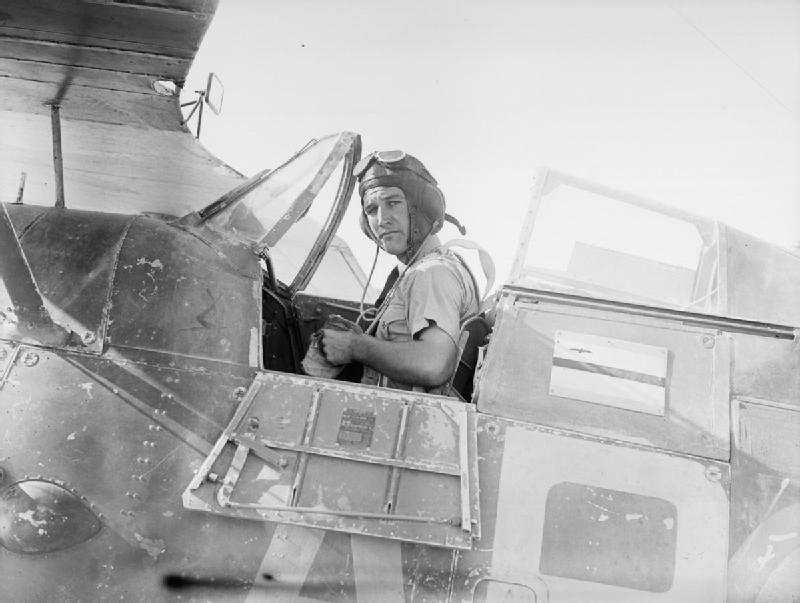
- Patrick Dunn in the cockpit of his Gloster Gladiator while commander of 80 Squadron, Egypt, circa August 1940
- Born: 31 December 1912; Glasgow, Scotland
- Died: 17 June 2004 (aged 91)
- Military career
- Allegiance: United Kingdom
- Branch: Royal Air Force
- Service years: 1933–67
- Rank: Air Marshal
- Commands: Flying Training Command (1964–66); No. 1 Group (1961–64); RAF Flying College (1956–58); No. 71 Operational Training Unit (1941); RAF Amriya (1941); No. 274 Squadron (1940–41); No. 80 Squadron (1940)
- Conflicts: Second World War; Malayan Emergency
- Awards: Knight Commander of the Order of the British Empire; Companion of the Order of the Bath; Distinguished Flying Cross

Air Marshal Sir Patrick Hunter Dunn, KBE, CB, DFC, FRAeS (31 December 1912 – 17 June 2004) was a Scottish Royal Air Force officer who served as Air Officer Commanding-in-Chief of Flying Training Command from 1964 to 1966.

== RAF career ==
Educated at Loretto School and the University of Glasgow, Dunn joined the Royal Air Force in March 1933. In May 1933, he was at No. 5 Flying Training School at RAF Sealand and was involved in a serious training accident while flying in an Avro 504. A collision with another Avro 504 resulted in the deaths of the other aircraft's pilot and the second person flying with Dunn. Dunn was uninjured and was able to land his aircraft despite significant damage.

After completing basic flying training, Dunn completed a flying boat pilot's course, then in 1934 joined 201 Squadron, flying Saro London flying boats. In the summer of 1936, he flew an aircraft in the search for survivors from the 1936 Jersey Air Disaster. Dunn was promoted from flying officer to flight lieutenant in 1937 In 1938, he joined the Long Range Development Unit, which experimentally flew Vickers Wellesleys over extremely long distances.

Dunn was promoted to squadron leader in June 1939. and in August 1939 he was posted to the RAF's Middle East headquarters.

=== Second World War ===
After the start of the Second World War, Dunn became the commanding officer of No. 80 Squadron in July 1940. The squadron flew Gloster Gladiator biplane fighters in the Middle East. A notable battle occurred on 8 August 1940 over Bir al-Gubbiyy, Libya, when Dunn lead a flight of three 80 Squadron Gladiators as bait for Italian fighters. When the three were attacked by Italian Fiat CR.42 Falcos, a further 11 Gladiators dived down from high altitude. Afterwards, 10 Italian aircraft were claimed destroyed, with a further seven "probables". Dunn himself had one confirmed kill and one probable.

Soon after this action, Dunn became the commander of No. 274 Squadron and then a Station Commander at RAF Amriya. He had a total of six aircraft destroyed, three more shared, and a number of probable kills. He was awarded the DFC in February 1941. Dunn briefly flew with No. 204 Squadron, then returned to the United Kingdom and became Aide de Camp to Marshal of the Royal Air Force Lord Trenchard in 1942. He transferred to Headquarters RAF Fighter Command and became Group Captain, Operations at Headquarters No. 12 Group in 1944 and Sector Commander at RAF Coltishall in 1945.

=== Post-War ===
After the war he was appointed Deputy Director of Personal Services at the Air Ministry and then became Senior Air Staff Officer at AHQ Malaya, in which role he used air power to combat the communist forces in the jungles on the ground during the Malayan Emergency.

Dunn received a knighthood in August 1950 and went on to be an instructor at the NATO Defence College in 1951 before becoming Group Captain, Plans and then Air Commodore, Operations at Headquarters RAF Fighter Command in 1953. He was made Commandant of the RAF Flying College at Manby in 1956, Deputy Air Secretary in 1958 and Air Officer Commanding No. 1 Group in 1961. His final posting was as Air Officer Commanding-in-Chief of Flying Training Command in 1964 before retiring in 1967.

== Later career ==
After leaving the RAF, he became a director of British Steel and deputy Chairman of the airline British Eagle, this collapsed soon after and he became Chairman of its successor company, Eagle Aircraft Services.

== Family ==
In 1939, Dunn married Diana Ledward-Smith; they had two daughters.

Military offices
Preceded by Sir Augustus Walker	Air Officer Commanding-in-Chief Flying Training Command; 1964–1966	Succeeded by Sir John Davis
Preceded by John Davis	Air Officer Commanding No. 1 Group; 1961–1964	Succeeded by Deryck Stapleton
