= Charles Broughton =

Royal Air Force air marshals (1911–1998)

Sir Charles Broughton
- Broughton in 1964
- Born: 27 April 1911; New Zealand
- Died: 17 May 1998 (aged 87)
- Military career
- Allegiance: United Kingdom
- Branch: Royal Air Force
- Service years: 1930–68
- Rank: Air Marshal
- Commands: Air Member for Supply and Organisation (1966–68); RAF Stornoway (1941); No. 48 Squadron (1941)
- Conflicts: Second World War
- Awards: Knight Commander of the Order of the British Empire; Companion of the Order of the Bath; Mentioned in Despatches (4)

Air Marshal Sir Charles Broughton, KBE, CB (27 April 1911 – 17 May 1998) was a Royal Air Force officer who served as Air Member for Supply and Organisation from 1966 until his retirement in 1968.

== RAF career ==
Broughton joined the Royal Air Force in 1930. He served in the Second World War as Officer Commanding No. 48 Squadron and then as Station Commander at RAF Stornoway before joining the Air Staff at Headquarters No. 15 Group. He continued his war service as Senior Personnel Staff Officer at Headquarters Air Defence Eastern Mediterranean and then as a member of the Directing Staff at the RAF Staff College (Overseas) in Haifa.

After the war he was on the staff at Headquarters RAF Flying Training Command and then at the Air Ministry. He was appointed Senior Air Staff Officer at Headquarters RAF Transport Command in 1958, Director-General of Organisation at the Air Ministry in 1961 and UK Permanent Military Deputy at CENTO in 1965 before becoming Air Member for Supply and Organisation in 1966, and retiring in 1968.

Military offices
Preceded by Sir John Davis	Air Member for Supply and Organisation; 1966–1968	Succeeded by Sir Thomas Prickett
