= Sulaiman Sujak =

Yang Berbahagia Tan Sri Dato' Sulaiman Sujak PSM DPMS JMN AMN

6th Chief of Air Staff
- In office 1 November 1968 – 31 December 1976
- Preceded by: Alasdair Mackay Sinclair Steedman
- Succeeded by: Mohamed Taib

Personal details
- Born: 25 March 1934 (age 92) Rangoon Road, Singapore, Straits Settlement
- Spouse: Puan Sri Zaharah binti Hashim (m. 1961)
- Education: Bartley Secondary School; Victoria School

Military service
- Allegiance: Malaysia
- Branch/service: Royal Air Force; Royal Malaysian Air Force
- Years of service: 1955-1976
- Rank: Air Lieutenant General

Sulaiman bin Sujak (born 25 March 1934 in Singapore) was the first non-British Chief of Air Force, Malaysia (November 1, 1967 – December 31, 1976)

Sulaiman studied in Bartley Secondary School and Victoria School in Singapore. He started training in the Malayan Air Training Corps (MATC) and in the UK from 1955 at the RAF College, Cranwell, graduating in 1958 as a Pilot Officer in the RAF, the Malaysian Air Force not having been created at that time. In the 1960s he was a Flight Lieutenant on an RAF Squadron in Cyprus flying the Canberra light bomber when the Royal Malaysian Air Force was formed. In September 1965 he joined the Royal Malaysian Air Force as a Squadron Leader, and shortly afterwards took command of the RMAF base at Alor Star as Group Captain.

On 1 November 1967, he was promoted to Air Commodore and became the first Chief of the Royal Malaysian Air Force.

Sulaiman later became the Vice-Chairman of Malaysia Airlines.

== Honours ==
=== Honour of Malaysia ===
- Malaysia :
  - Commander of the Order of Loyalty to the Crown of Malaysia (PSM) – Tan Sri (2008)
  - Companion of the Order of the Defender of the Realm (JMN) (1969)
  - Member of the Order of the Defender of the Realm (AMN) (1967)
- Selangor :
  - Knight Commander of the Order of the Crown of Selangor (DPMS) – Dato' (1970)

Military offices
Preceded by A McK S Steedman; As Chief of the Air Staff	Chief of the Royal Malaysian Air Force; 1967 – 1976	Succeeded by Mohamad Taib
