= Alasdair Steedman =

Former Senior Commander of the Royal Air Force

Sir Alasdair Steedman
- Born: 29 January 1922
- Died: 2 January 1992 (aged 69)
- Military career
- Allegiance: United Kingdom
- Branch: Royal Air Force
- Service years: 1942–1981
- Rank: Air chief marshal
- Commands: Air Member for Supply and Organisation (1976–77); RAF Staff College, Bracknell (1972–75); Chief of the Malaysian Air Staff (1965–67); RAF Lyneham (1962–64); Royal Ceylon Air Force Base Katanayake (1957–59); No. 8 Squadron (1949–51); No. 39 Squadron (1948–49)
- Conflicts: Second World War
- Awards: Knight Grand Cross of the Order of the Bath; Commander of the Order of the British Empire; Distinguished Flying Cross; Queen's Commendation for Valuable Service in the Air; Companion of the Order of the Defender of the Realm (Malaya); Commander of the Order of Polonia Restituta (Poland)

Air Chief Marshal Sir Alasdair McKay Sinclair Steedman, GCB, CBE, DFC, FRAeS (29 January 1922 – 2 January 1992) was a senior commander in the Royal Air Force.

== RAF career ==
Steedman joined the Royal Air Force in 1942 and served as a pilot during the Second World War. He was awarded the Distinguished Flying Cross in 1944 in recognition of his service on reconnaissance sorties over Italy and Yugoslavia. He was awarded the Queen's Commendation for Valuable Service in the Air in the 1957 Birthday Honours. He was appointed Officer Commanding No. 39 Squadron in 1948 and Officer Commanding No. 8 Squadron in 1949. He went on to be Station Commander at Royal Ceylon Air Force Base Katanayake in 1957 and after a tour on the Directing Staff at the Joint Services Staff College from 1960 he became Station Commander at RAF Lyneham in 1962. He was appointed a Commander of the Order of the British Empire in the 1965 New Year Honours.

From 1965 to 1967 he was Chief of the Air Staff of the Royal Malaysian Air Force. He was made Director of Defence Plans (Air) in 1967, Director of the Defence Operations Staff in 1968 and Assistant Chief of the Air Staff (Policy) in 1969. He went on to be Senior Air Staff Officer at Headquarters RAF Strike Command in 1971, Commandant of the RAF Staff College, Bracknell, in 1972 and Air Member for Supply and Organisation in 1976. In October 1977, on promotion to air chief marshal, Steedman took up his last appointment as the UK Military Representative to NATO. He was promoted to Knight Grand Cross of the Order of the Bath (GCB) in the 1980 Birthday Honours, having previously been appointed a Commander of the Order (CB) in the 1973 Birthday Honours, and a Knight Commander of the Order (KCB) in the 1976 Birthday Honours.

== Retirement and later life ==
After retiring in 1981, Steedman took up position as the Controller of the RAF Benevolent Fund until 1988. He was also Chairman of the Royal International Air Tattoo between 1981 and 1988.

Military offices
Preceded by Cyril West	Chief of the Air Staff of the Royal Malaysian Air Force; 1965–1967	Succeeded by Sulaiman Sujak
Preceded by Michael Beetham	Commandant of the RAF Staff College, Bracknell; 1972–1975	Succeeded by Keith Williamson
Preceded by Sir Anthony Heward	Air Member for Supply and Organisation; 1976–1977	Succeeded by Sir John Nicholls
Preceded by Sir David Fraser	UK Military Representative to NATO; 1977–1980	Succeeded by Sir Anthony Morton
