= Gilbert Nicholetts =

Royal Air Force Air Marshal (1902-1983)

Sir Gilbert Nicholetts
- Born: 9 November 1902
- Died: 7 September 1983 (aged 80)
- Military career
- Allegiance: United Kingdom
- Branch: Royal Air Force
- Service years: 1921–1959
- Rank: Air Marshal
- Commands: AHQ Malta (1956–57); RAF Flying Training Command (1955); No. 21 Group (1953–55); Central Photographic Establishment (1946–48); RAF Shallufa (1941); RAF Haifa (1941); No. 228 Squadron (1939–41)
- Conflicts: Second World War
- Awards: Knight Commander of the Order of the British Empire; Companion of the Order of the Bath; Air Force Cross & Bar; Mentioned in Despatches (2)

Air Marshal Sir Gilbert Edward Nicholetts, KBE, CB, AFC & Bar (9 November 1902 – 7 September 1983) was a senior commander in the Royal Air Force during the 1950s.

== RAF career ==
Educated at Royal Naval College, Dartmouth, Nicholetts joined the Royal Air Force (RAF) in 1921. He developed a career in flying boat units and with the Fleet Air Arm, then under RAF control. In the late 1920s he was based in the Far East, flying the Short Singapore.

In 1933 Nicholetts established a long-distance flight record from Cranwell, England to Walvis Bay, South West Africa as navigator on the Fairey Long-range Monoplane, continuing on to Cape Town. He was awarded the Air Force Cross.

Nicholetts was appointed Officer Commanding No. 228 Squadron, just after the outbreak of the Second World War. Based at Alexandria, Egypt, flying a Short Sunderland, Nicholetts personally commanded the RAF reconnaissance flight preceding the November 1940 Fleet Air Arm Taranto raid. He went on to be Station Commander at RAF Haifa and then RAF Shallufa, before later being taken prisoner of war by the Japanese in 1942 in the Dutch East Indies. After the war he became Senior Air Service Officer at Headquarters No. 25 (Armament) Group and then Air Officer Commanding the Central Photographic Establishment before becoming Director of Organisation at the Air Ministry in 1948. He was then made Senior Air Service Officer at Headquarters RAF Coastal Command in 1951, Air Officer Commanding No. 21 Group in 1953 and Air Officer Commanding AHQ Malta in 1956. His last appointment was as Inspector-General of the RAF in 1958 before retiring in 1959.

Military offices
Preceded by Sir Walter Dawson	Inspector-General of the RAF; 1958–1959	Succeeded by Sir John Whitley
