= Paterson Fraser =

Royal Air Force Air Marshal (1907-2001)

Air Marshal The Reverend Sir Paterson Fraser KBE, CB, AFC
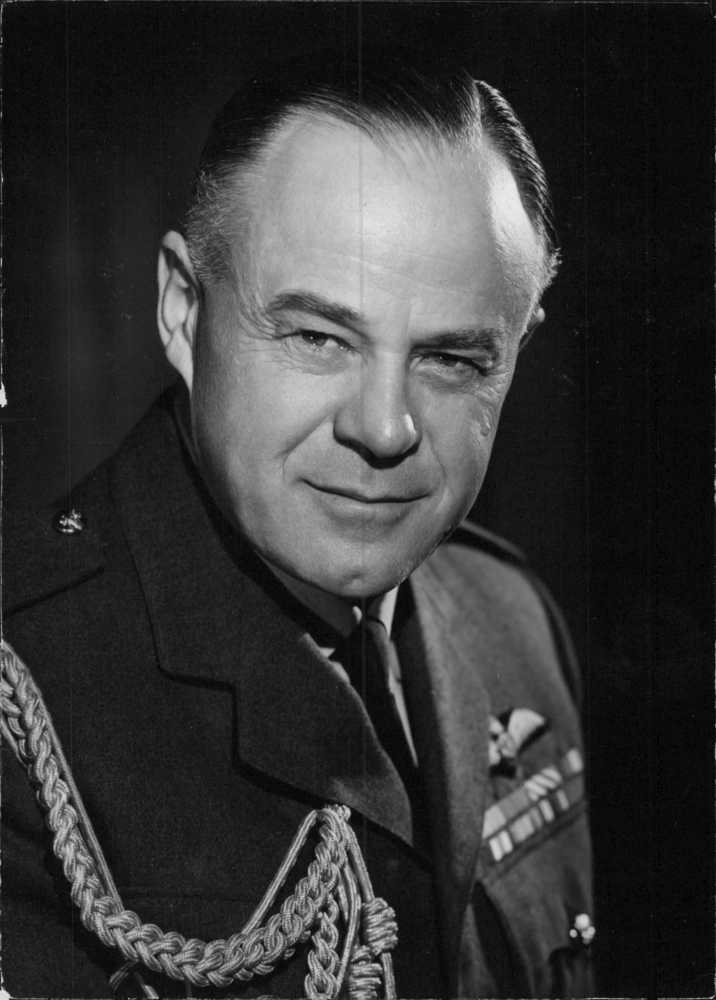
- Born: 15 July 1907
- Died: 4 August 2001 (aged 94)
- Military career
- Allegiance: United Kingdom
- Branch: Royal Air Force
- Service years: 1927–1964
- Rank: Air Marshal
- Commands: Inspector-General of the RAF (1962–64); No. 12 (Fighter) Group (1956–58); Aeroplane and Armament Experimental Establishment (1945–47)
- Conflicts: Second World War
- Awards: Knight Commander of the Order of the British Empire; Companion of the Order of the Bath; Air Force Cross

Air Marshal Sir Henry Paterson Fraser, KBE, CB, AFC (15 July 1907 – 4 August 2001) was a senior commander in the Royal Air Force during the Second World War and in the post-war years.

== RAF career ==
Educated at St. Andrew's College, Grahamstown, South Africa, and Pembroke College, Cambridge, Fraser joined the Royal Air Force in 1927. He became a test pilot in 1934. He served in the Second World War as Officer Commanding the Experimental Flying Section at RAE Farnborough and then as deputy director of War Organisation at the Air Ministry. In this capacity he prepared the early plans for the Normandy landings. He continued his war service on the staff at Headquarters Second Tactical Air Force and then as Commandant of the Aeroplane and Armament Experimental Establishment.

After the war Fraser became deputy director of Policy (Air Staff) and then a member of the Defence Research Policy Staff. He was appointed Senior Air Staff Officer at Headquarters RAF Fighter Command in 1952, Chief of Staff at Headquarters Allied Air Forces Central Europe in 1954 and Air Officer Commanding No. 12 (Fighter) Group in 1956. He went on to be Director of RAF Exercise Planning in 1959, UK Permanent Military Representative at CENTO later in 1959 and Inspector-General of the RAF in 1962 before retiring in 1964.

In retirement Fraser was ordained as a priest.

== Family ==
In 1933 Fraser married Avis Gertrude Haswell; they had two sons.

Military offices
Preceded by Sir John Whitley	Inspector-General of the RAF; 1962–1964	Succeeded by Sir Augustus Walker
Preceded by William Crisham	No. 12 (Fighter) Group; 1966–1968	Succeeded by Christopher Hartley (Acting)
