= Kevin Leeson =

Air Marshal Sir Kevin Leeson KCB CBE FREng
- Born: 11 June 1956 (age 70)
- Military career
- Allegiance: United Kingdom
- Branch: Royal Air Force
- Service years: 1974–2012
- Rank: Air Marshal
- Commands: Air Member for Materiel (2009–12)
- Awards: Knight Commander of the Order of the Bath; Commander of the Order of the British Empire

Air Marshal Sir Kevin James Leeson, KCB, CBE, FREng (born 11 June 1956) is a retired Royal Air Force engineer officer, whose final appointment was as Chief of Materiel – Air at the Defence Equipment and Support organisation, concurrently holding the appointments of Air Member for Materiel on the Air Force Board and Chief Engineer (RAF), at which point he was the most senior non-aircrew officer in the service.

Having been responsible for various aspects of engineering support to the Tornado aircraft and the introduction of the Eurofighter Typhoon into service, he held several senior appointments at the Ministry of Defence before taking up his final appointment in 2009. He retired from the RAF in October 2012.

== Early life ==
Leeson was born on 11 June 1956. In 1977, he graduated from the University of Manchester Institute of Science and Technology with a first class degree in Electrical and Electronic Engineering.

== RAF career ==
Leeson was commissioned as a University Cadet in September 1974, being regraded to pilot officer in July 1977. He was then promoted to flying officer in January 1978, and flight lieutenant in October 1980. Early in his career he was responsible for the first line servicing of Hercules and Tornado aircraft. He was promoted to squadron leader in January 1986.

He also spent time in the Ministry of Defence (MOD) planning the support of the Eurofighter Typhoon electrical and armament systems. Following promotion to wing commander in January 1990 Leeson attended the Advanced Staff Course, then returned to the MOD to head the branch responsible for the support planning of the Typhoon's avionics, electrics and software, before commanding the Engineering Wing at RAF Marham. In 1996 he moved to Headquarters Strike Command, being promoted to group captain in January 1997, to manage the supply and engineering activities for the whole Tornado fleet, at that time comprising both ground attack / reconnaissance and fighter variants, spread across seven Main Operating Bases, and with detachments in Turkey, Saudi Arabia, Kuwait and the Falkland Islands. After graduating from the 1999 course at the Royal College of Defence Studies, Leeson again returned to the MOD, now as Group Captain Air Resources and Plans.

Leeson was appointed Head of Air Resources and Plans in 2000, his promotion to air commodore following in July 2001. He was appointed a Commander of the Order of the British Empire in the 2003 Birthday Honours List. Following promotion to air vice marshal in September 2004, Leeson was appointed Assistant Chief of Defence Staff – Logistics Operations. He went on to be Assistant Chief of Defence Staff – Strategy and Plans in July 2007 and was promoted to air marshal and appointed Chief of Materiel – Air at Defence Equipment and Support in May 2009 joining the Air Force Board as Air Member for Materiel and Chief Engineer (RAF).

Appointed a Knight Commander of the Order of the Bath (KCB) in the 2012 New Year Honours, Leeson retired from the RAF in October that year.

== Later life ==
On leaving the RAF, Leeson founded his own consultancy company. He also served as a member of the British Airways Board Safety Review Committee and a senior advisor to Atkins Defence, Aerospace and Security. He went on to be director of military affairs for Airbus UK, senior military advisor to Airtanker and a senior advisor to Newton Europe. He was president and subsequently vice patron, of the Armed Forces Winter Sports Association and was chairman of the RAF Charitable Trust, the charity that stages the Royal International Air Tattoo.

He was awarded an honorary Doctor of Engineering by the University of Manchester in 2023.

== Personal life ==
Leeson became a Chartered Engineer in 1982 and a Fellow of the Institution of Engineering and Technology (IET) in 1997. He was elected a Fellow of the Royal Academy of Engineering (FREng) in 2012.

Military offices
Preceded by J Connolly	Head of Air Resources & Plans Ministry of Defence; 2000–2004	Succeeded by Andrew Pulford
Preceded by A J Smith	Assistant Chief of Defence Staff – Logistics Operations; 2004–2007	Succeeded by D Shouesmith
Preceded by Timothy Laurence	Assistant Chief of Defence Staff – Strategy & Plans; 2007–2009	Succeeded by Alan Richards
Preceded by Sir Barry Thornton	Chief of Materiel – Air, Defence Equipment and Support and Air Member for Materiel; 2009–2012	Succeeded by Sir Simon Bollom
