= John Whitley (RAF officer) =

Royal Air Force Air Marshal (1905-1997)

Sir John Whitley
- Born: 7 September 1905
- Died: 26 December 1997 (aged 92)
- Military career
- Allegiance: United Kingdom
- Branch: Royal Air Force
- Service years: 1926–62
- Rank: Air Marshal
- Commands: Inspector-General of the RAF (1959–62); Air Member for Personnel (1957–59); No. 1 Group (1953–56); RAF Karachi (1946–47); No. 8 Group (1945–46); No. 4 Group (1945); No. 43 Base (1944–45); RAF Lissett (1943–44); RAF Linton-on-Ouse (1941–43); No. 149 Squadron (1940)
- Conflicts: Second World War
- Awards: Knight Commander of the Order of the British Empire; Companion of the Order of the Bath; Distinguished Service Order; Air Force Cross & Bar; Mentioned in Despatches (3)

Air Marshal Sir John Rene Whitley, KBE, CB, DSO, AFC & Bar (7 September 1905 – 26 December 1997) was a senior commander in the Royal Air Force during the Second World War and also in the post-war years.

== RAF career ==
Whitley joined the Royal Air Force in 1926. While serving in India, he was awarded the Air Force Cross for relief flights after the 1935 Quetta earthquake. He served in the Second World War as Officer Commanding No. 149 Squadron and then as Station Commander at RAF Linton-on-Ouse. In April 1943, he was shot down in a Halifax bomber over Belgium. Landing by parachute in Northern France, with the help of the French Resistance he escaped through the Basque country to Spain. Returning to England, he continued his war service as Station Commander at RAF Lissett and then as Air Officer Commanding No. 43 Base. He went on to be Air Officer Commanding No. 4 Group and then Air Officer Commanding No. 8 Group.

After the war he served as Assistant Air Officer Administration at Headquarters Air Command South East Asia and then as Station Commander at RAF Karachi. He was appointed Director of Organisation (Establishments) at the Air Ministry in 1947 and Air Officer Administration at Headquarters Second Tactical Air Force in 1951. He went on to be Air Officer Commanding No. 1 Group in 1953, Air Member for Personnel in 1957 and Inspector-General of the RAF in 1959 before retiring in 1962.

Military offices
Preceded by Sir Francis Fogarty	Air Member for Personnel; 1957–1959	Succeeded by Sir Hubert Patch
Preceded by Sir Gilbert Nicholetts	Inspector-General of the RAF; 1959–1962	Succeeded by Sir Paterson Fraser
