= Barry Thornton =

British Royal Air Force officer (born 1952)

Sir Barry Michael Thornton
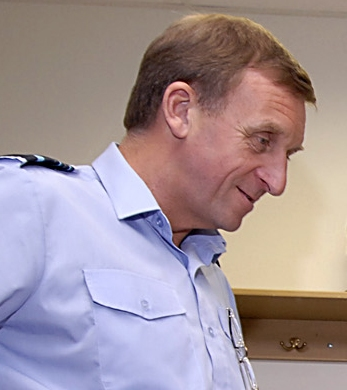
- Air Marshal Sir Barry Thornton in March 2007
- Born: 1952 (age 73–74)
- Military career
- Allegiance: United Kingdom
- Branch: Royal Air Force
- Service years: 1976–2009
- Rank: Air Marshal
- Commands: Air Member for Material (2007–09); Personnel and Training Command (2006–07); Air Member for Logistics (2004–06)
- Conflicts: Gulf War
- Awards: Knight Commander of the Order of the Bath

Sir Barry Michael Thornton (born 1952) is a British retired officer who was a senior commander in the Royal Air Force.

== Personal life ==
Thornton was educated at Baines Grammar School and the University of Nottingham.

He is married to Delia Thornton, a trained midwife and family law barrister. The couple has two sons, Oliver and William.

== Military career ==
Thornton joined the Royal Air Force in 1976. He was given command of the Engineering and Supply Wing at RAF Honington in 1988 and subsequently deployed to Tabuk Air Base during the Gulf War. In 1991 he took command of the RAF's nuclear weapon inspection team. Then in 1997 he joined the Defence Procurement Agency as the Director of Maritime Projects with responsibility for the Merlin and Nimrod programmes. In 2000 he became Controller of Aircraft on the Air Force Board and in 2003 he was made Director General Equipment Support (Air) and then Director General Logistics (Strike) at the Defence Logistics Organisation. He became the last Commander in Chief Personnel and Training Command in January 2006 serving until April 2007 when the command was merged into Air Command: he then took up the post of Chief of Defence Material (Air) at Defence Equipment & Support. He retired in May 2009.

Military offices
Preceded by Post re-activated	Air Member for Logistics; 2004–2006	Succeeded by David Rennison
Preceded by Sir Joe French	Air Member for Personnel; 2006–2007	Succeeded by Stephen Dalton
Preceded by Sir Joe French	Commander-in-Chief Personnel and Training Command; 2006–2007	Command disestablished
New title Post established	Chief of Material (Air); 2007–2009	Succeeded by Kevin Leeson
