= Walter Merton =

RAF Air Chief Marshal (1905-1986)

Sir Walter Merton
- Born: 29 August 1905
- Died: 23 March 1986 (aged 80)
- Military career
- Allegiance: United Kingdom
- Branch: Royal Air Force
- Service years: 1924–63
- Rank: Air Chief Marshal
- Commands: Air Member for Supply and Organisation (1960–63); Chief of the RNZAF Air Staff (1954–56); No. 22 Group (1952–54); No. 63 Group (1951–52); RAF Upwood (1946–47); RAF Mildenhall (1946); RAF Luqa (1943); No. 37 Squadron (1940–41); No. 218 Squadron (1940); No. 38 Squadron (1937–39)
- Conflicts: Second World War
- Awards: Knight Grand Cross of the Order of the British Empire; Knight Commander of the Order of the Bath; Mentioned in Despatches (3); Grand Cross of the Order of George I with Swords (Greece); Gold Cross of the Order of St. George with Crossed Swords (Greece); Grand Cross of the Order of the Phoenix (Greece)

Air Chief Marshal Sir Walter Hugh Merton, GBE, KCB (29 August 1905 – 23 March 1986) was a senior Royal Air Force (RAF) commander during the Second World War. After the war he held several senior RAF appointments before his retirement in 1963.

== RAF career ==
Born in Canada, Merton joined the Royal Air Force as a cadet in 1924. He was appointed Officer Commanding No. 38 Squadron in 1937. He served in the Second World War as Officer Commanding No. 218 Squadron and then as Officer Commanding No. 37 Squadron. He continued his war service as Senior Air Staff Officer at Headquarters 257 Wing and then in the Middle East. He was made Station Commander at RAF Luqa in 1943 and Assistant Commandant at the RAF War Staff College in April 1944 before becoming Director of Organisation at the Air Ministry in August 1944.

After the war he became Station Commander at RAF Mildenhall and then at RAF Upwood before becoming Air Attaché in Prague in 1947. He was appointed Deputy Director for Air Force Liaison in 1948, Head of the RAF Delegation in Greece in 1949 and Air Officer Commanding No. 63 Group in 1951. He went on to be Air Officer Commanding No. 22 Group in 1952, Chief of Staff to the Royal New Zealand Air Force in 1954 and Air Officer for Administration at Headquarters RAF Bomber Command in 1956. After that he was made Chief of Staff at Headquarters Allied Air Forces Central Europe in 1959 and Air Member for Supply and Organisation in 1960 before retiring in 1963.

In retirement he became Inspector-General of Civil Defence.

Military offices
Preceded by David Carnegie	Chief of the Air Staff (RNZAF); 1954–1956	Succeeded by Cyril Kay
Preceded by Sir Walter Dawson	Air Member for Supply and Organisation; 1960–1963	Succeeded by Sir John Baker-Carr (acting)
