= Leslie Hollinghurst =

Royal Air Force Air Chief Marshal (1895-1971)

Sir Leslie Hollinghurst
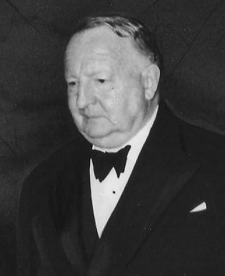
- Born: 2 January 1895; Muswell Hill, Middlesex
- Died: 8 October 1971 (aged 76)
- Military career
- Allegiance: United Kingdom
- Branch: Royal Air Force
- Service years: 1914–1952
- Rank: Air Chief Marshal
- Commands: Air Member for Personnel (1949–1952); Inspector-General of the RAF (1948–1949); Air Member for Supply and Organisation (1945–1948); No. 38 (Airborne Forces) Group (1943–1944); No. 9 (Fighter) Group (1943); No. 20 Squadron (1932–1935)
- Conflicts: First World War; Second World War
- Awards: Knight Grand Cross of the Order of the British Empire; Knight Commander of the Order of the Bath; Distinguished Flying Cross; Mentioned in Despatches (2); Distinguished Flying Cross (United States); Commander of the Order of Leopold (Belgium); Bronze Lion (Netherlands); Officer of the Legion of Honour (France); Croix de guerre (France)

Air Chief Marshal Sir Leslie Norman Hollinghurst, GBE, KCB, DFC (2 January 1895 – 8 June 1971) was a British flying ace of the First World War and a senior commander in the Royal Air Force.

== Early life and First World War ==
Hollinghurst was born in Muswell Hill, Middlesex, England on 2 January 1895, and was the second of three children of Charles Herbert Hollinghurst and Teresa Petty. At the outbreak of the war in 1914, Hollinghurst enlisted with the Royal Engineers participating in the Gallipoli landings and was wounded at Salonika. In 1916 he was commissioned into the 3rd Battalion, the Middlesex Regiment, and later in the same year was seconded to the Royal Flying Corps (RFC). He learned to fly while serving in Egypt and went on to become a captain in No. 87 Squadron flying Sopwith Dolphins, and was awarded the Distinguished Flying Cross in October 1918, having destroyed four enemy aircraft. His final total was 11 confirmed victories. Leslie's two siblings also served in the war: Charles Stanley Hollinghurst was also in the RFC and was awarded the Military Cross and Distinguished Conduct Medal, while Phyllis Hollinghurst enlisted in the Royal Air Force; the Women's Royal Air Force.

== Interwar service ==
In 1919 Hollinghurst was given a permanent commission in the Royal Air Force. He served in India and China, and was appointed an Officer of the Order of the British Empire in 1931. In 1932 he was appointed Officer Commanding No. 20 Squadron. On return to the United Kingdom in 1935 he became a member of staff of the RAF Staff College and was promoted to the rank of group captain with a position at the Air Ministry in 1939.

== Second World War ==
Hollinghurst was appointed Director General of Organisation for the RAF in 1940, and was promoted to the rank of air commodore in 1941 and acting air vice marshal in the following year. In 1943 he was given command of No. 9 Group. Later in the year he was given command of No. 38 Group, formed to transport airborne troops in the forthcoming Normandy Landings. Hollinghurst was on board the first pathfinder aircraft to leave for Europe on the evening of 5 June 1944. No. 38 group were later involved in Operation Market Garden, for which Hollinghurst was awarded United States Distinguished Flying Cross. Later in 1944 he was appointed commanding officer of air bases in south east Asia.

== Post war ==
Returning to the UK in 1945, Hollinghurst became Air Member for Supply and Organisation, and received substantive rank as air vice marshal in 1946. He was Inspector-General of the Royal Air Force from 1948 to 1949, and was Air Member for Personnel from 1949 to 1952. He was promoted to air chief marshal in 1950, and retired in 1952. Following his retirement he was twice called upon to produce reports on technical aspects of the RAF.

During 1966, he served as the Senior Steward of the National Greyhound Racing Club.

Hollinghurst died on 8 June 1971, having collapsed on his journey back from a commemoration of the Normandy Landings.

Military offices
Preceded by John Jones	Air Officer Commanding No. 9 (Fighter) Group; 1943	Succeeded by Cecil Stevens
Preceded by Sir Christopher Courtney	Air Member for Supply and Organisation; 1945–1948	Succeeded by Sir George Pirie
Preceded by Sir George Pirie	Inspector-General of the RAF; 1948–1949	Succeeded by Sir Hugh Saunders
Preceded by Sir Hugh Saunders	Air Member for Personnel; 1949–1952	Succeeded by Sir Francis Fogarty
