= Air Member for Materiel =

Senior Royal Air Force officer

The Air Member for Materiel is the senior Royal Air Force officer responsible for procurement matters. The post-holder is a member of the Air Force Board and is in charge of all aspects of procurement and organisation for RAF regular, reserve and civilian staffs worldwide.

== History ==
The post which was created in 1923 was originally known as the Air Member for Supply and Research; it was renamed Air Member for Supply and Organisation in 1936 and Air Member for Logistics in 1994. Since 2007 it has been the Air Member for Materiel.

== Holders of the post ==
Holders of the post have included:
Air Member for Supply and Research

- 1923 Air Vice-Marshal G H Salmond
- December 1926 Air Marshal J F A Higgins
- September 1930 Air Marshal H C T Dowding

Air Member for Supply and Organisation

- 14 January 1935 Air Vice Marshal C L N Newall
- 1 September 1937 Air Vice Marshal W L Welsh
- 15 January 1940 Air Marshal Sir Christopher Courtney
- 14 September 1945 Air Marshal Sir Leslie Hollinghurst
- 1 September 1948 Air Chief Marshal Sir George Pirie
- 2 March 1950 Air Chief Marshal Sir William Dickson
- 1 September 1952 Air Chief Marshal Sir John Whitworth-Jones
- 1 May 1954 Air Chief Marshal Sir Donald Hardman
- 1 January 1958 Air Chief Marshal Sir Walter Dawson
- 8 April 1960 Air Marshal Sir Walter Merton
- 1963 Air Marshal Sir John Baker-Carr (acting)
- 1 August 1963 Air Marshal Sir John Davis
- 2 August 1966 Air Marshal Sir Charles Broughton
- 4 September 1968 Air Marshal Sir Thomas Prickett
- 1 December 1970 Air Marshal Sir Neil Wheeler
- 27 March 1973 Air Marshal Sir Anthony Heward
- 3 June 1976 Air Marshal Sir Alasdair Steedman
- 28 September 1977 Air Marshal Sir John Nicholls
- 1 December 1978 Air Marshal Sir Rex Roe
- 4 July 1981 Air Chief Marshal Sir John Rogers
- 1 January 1983 Air Marshal Sir Michael Knight
- 7 February 1985 Air Marshal Sir Michael Armitage
- 27 November 1987 Air Marshal Sir Patrick Hine
- 5 August 1988 Air Marshal Sir Brendan Jackson

Air Member for Logistics

- 1 April 1994 Air Chief Marshal Sir Michael Alcock
- 8 March 1996 Air Chief Marshal Sir John Allison
- 11 July 1997 Air Marshal Sir Colin Terry
- 30 April 1999 Air Marshal Malcolm Pledger
- 3 September 1999 Air Vice-Marshal Graham Skinner

Note: From 1999 to 2004 the post was vacant

- 2004 Air Vice-Marshal Barry Thornton
- January 2006 Air Vice-Marshal David Rennison

Air Member for Materiel

- April 2007 Air Marshal Sir Barry Thornton
- May 2009 Air Marshal Sir Kevin Leeson
- October 2012 Air Marshal Sir Simon Bollom
- April 2016 Air Marshal Sir Julian Young
- September 2020 Vice Admiral Sir Richard Thompson
