= David Cardwell =

British superconducting engineer

David Cardwell FREng
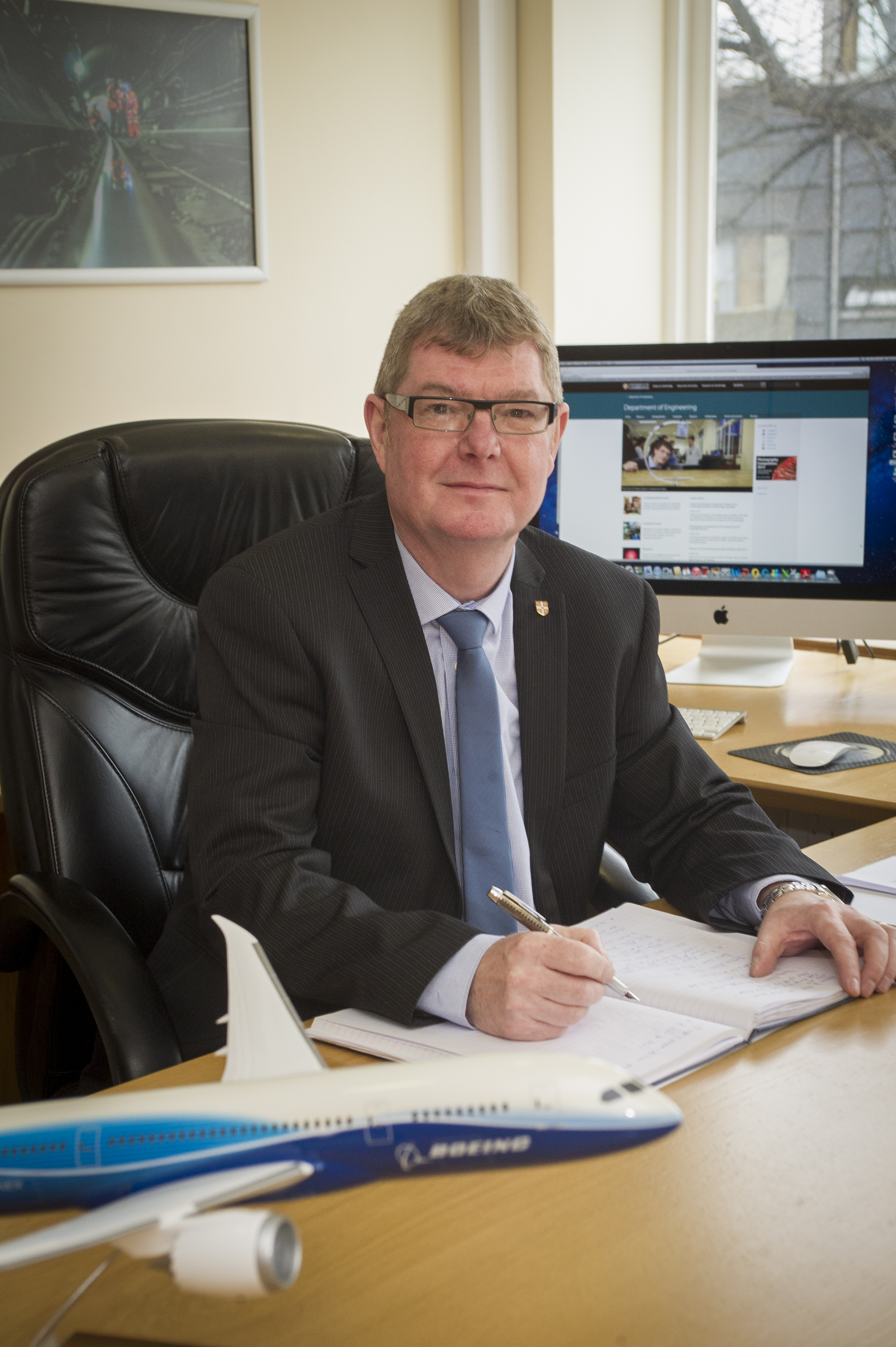
- Education: Fitzwilliam College, Cambridge; University of Warwick
- Awards: FREng (2012)
- Scientific career
- Fields: Superconducting engineering
- Workplaces: University of Cambridge
- Website: bulk-sucon.eng.cam.ac.uk/dc135/

David A. Cardwell is a British superconducting engineer. He is a Professor of Superconducting Engineering, former Pro-Vice-Chancellor for Strategy and Planning at the University of Cambridge (2018-2024), former head of the University of Cambridge Department of Engineering (2014-2018), former co-director of the KACST-Cambridge Research Centre and a fellow of Fitzwilliam College. In 2012, Cardwell was elected as a fellow of the Royal Academy of Engineering.

== Education ==
Cardwell studied at the University of Warwick (BSc 1983, PhD 1987). He is a fellow of the Institute of Physics and the Institution of Engineering and Technology.

== Degrees ==
- DSc, Warwick University, 2015
- ScD, University of Cambridge, 2014
- MA, University of Cambridge, 1995
- PhD, Warwick University, 1987
- BSc, Warwick University, 1983

== Research interests ==
Professor Cardwell's research interests include the processing, modelling and characterisation of bulk superconductors for high-field engineering applications. Materials of particular interest include high-temperature superconductors within the (RE)BCO family and MgB2. He has authored or co-authored more than 370 published papers.

== Current position ==
- Visiting Professor at the University of Hong Kong
- Adjunct Professor at the Shanghai University of Science and Technology
- Member of the Hong Kong Government University Grants Committee
- Treasurer of the European Society for Applied Superconductivity
- Member of the Advisory Board of Superconductor Science and Technology
- Chairman of the Thomas School Development Steering Committee (Ambright Education Group)

== Distinctions ==
- Fellow of the Royal Academy of Engineering
- Fellow of the Institute of Physics
- Fellow of the IET

== Prizes ==
- The Society of Automotive Engineering (SAE) Arch T. Colwell Merit Award, 2008
- PASREG prize for excellence in the processing of bulk superconductors, 2001

== See also ==
- University of Cambridge
- High-temperature superconductivity
