= Gus Walker =

English pilot, officer, rugby player

Sir George Augustus Walker
- Born: 24 August 1912; West Garforth, Leeds
- Died: 11 December 1986 (aged 74); King's Lynn, Norfolk
- Military career
- Allegiance: United Kingdom
- Branch: Royal Air Force
- Service years: 1933–1970
- Rank: Air Chief Marshal
- Nicknames: Gus, One-armed bandit
- Commands: Inspector-General of the RAF (1964–1967); Flying Training Command (1961–1964); No. 1 Group (1956–1959); RAF Coningsby (1951–1952); RAF Pocklington (1943); RAF Syerston (1942–1943); No. 50 Squadron (1940–1942)
- Conflicts: Second World War
- Awards: Knight Grand Cross of the Order of the Bath; Commander of the Order of the British Empire; Distinguished Service Order; Distinguished Flying Cross; Air Force Cross; Mentioned in Despatches; Legion of Honour (France); Croix de guerre (France)

Air Chief Marshal Sir George Augustus Walker, GCB, CBE, DSO, DFC, AFC (24 August 1912 – 11 December 1986) was a Second World War bomber pilot, a jet aircraft pioneer, and a senior Royal Air Force officer in the post-war era, as well as a rugby player.

== Early life ==
Walker was born on 24 August 1912 in West Garforth, Leeds, and studied at St. Bees School in Cumberland, and St Catharine's College, Cambridge, where he took a second in the natural science tripos. He played rugby for Yorkshire, and twice for England in 1939.

== RAF career ==
He joined the Royal Air Force from university on 29 March 1933. In November 1940 during the Second World War he was appointed Officer Commanding No. 50 Squadron in which role he earned the Distinguished Service Order and Distinguished Flying Cross before moving on to become Station Commander at RAF Syerston in April 1942. While working as station commander at RAF Syerston he rushed in a fire truck from the control tower to a taxiing Lancaster bomber when he saw it was on fire. He then tried to remove incendiary bombs from under the bomb bay in the hope that he could prevent a 4,000-pound (1,800 kg) bomb from exploding, but it detonated and he lost his right arm as a result. Returning to active service with an artificial arm, he was referred to by personnel as the one-armed bandit. In February 1945 he was appointed Senior Air Staff Officer at Headquarters No. 4 Group and went on to receive the Croix de Guerre and Légion d'Honneur.

After the War he was appointed Deputy Director of Operational Training at the Air Ministry before taking up the role of Senior Air Staff Officer for the Rhodesian Air Training Group in 1948. In 1951 he became Officer Commanding RAF Coningsby and in 1954 he was made Commandant of the RAF Flying College at Manby where he developed flying techniques for jet aircraft: he received the Air Force Cross in 1956 for his work in this and techniques for flights over the North Pole.

He became Air Officer Commanding No. 1 Group in October 1956, Chief Information Officer at the Air Ministry in 1959 and Air Officer Commanding-in-Chief at Flying Training Command in 1961. He held the post of Inspector-General of the RAF from 1964 to 1966 when he became Deputy Commander-in-Chief Allied Forces Central Europe. He continued his interest in rugby, acting as a referee and being President of the Rugby Union in 1965–6. He retired in 1970.

Following his retirement he carried out various voluntary activities, notably for the Royal Air Forces Association, including the role of President.

== Family ==
On 5 September 1942 he married Dorothy Brenda Wilcox (who survived him) and they had a son and daughter. He died 11 December 1986 in King's Lynn, Norfolk. He is commemorated by a memorial blue plaque in Lidgett Lane in Garforth, where he lived as a child.

Military offices
Preceded by Sir Hugh Constantine	Air Officer Commanding-in-Chief Flying Training Command; 1961–1964	Succeeded by Sir Patrick Dunn
Preceded by Sir Paterson Fraser	Inspector-General of the RAF; 1964–1967	Succeeded by Sir Reginald Emson
Preceded by Sir Edmund Hudleston; As Commander Allied Air Forces Central Europe	Deputy C-in-C Allied Forces Central Europe; 1967–1970	Succeeded by Sir Frederick Rosier
