= Rochford Hughes =

Royal Air Force Air Marshal (1914-1996)

Sir Rochford Hughes
- Rochford Hughes in 1938
- Born: 25 October 1914; Devonport, Auckland, New Zealand
- Died: 17 September 1996 (aged 81); Taupō, New Zealand
- Military career
- Allegiance: New Zealand; United Kingdom
- Branch: Royal New Zealand Air Force (1937–38); Royal Air Force (1938–69)
- Service years: 1937–1969
- Rank: Air marshal
- Commands: Far East Air Force (1966–69); No. 19 (Reconnaissance) Group (1962–64); RAF Jever (1955–59); Royal Aircraft Establishment (c.1952–54); No. 511 Squadron (1945–46)
- Conflicts: Second World War
- Awards: Knight Commander of the Order of the Bath; Commander of the Order of the British Empire; Air Force Cross; Mentioned in dispatches Flying Cross (Greece)

Air Marshal Sir Sidney Weetman Rochford Hughes, KCB, CBE, AFC, FRAeS (25 October 1914 – 17 September 1996) was a Royal Air Force officer who served as Air Officer Commanding Far East Air Force from 1966 to 1969.

== RAF career ==
Educated at Waitaki Boys' High School, Hughes was part of the editorial team at the New Zealand Herald from 1933. He joined the Royal New Zealand Air Force in 1937 but was transferred to the Royal Air Force in 1938. He served in the Second World War mainly in the Middle East and North Africa; after being shot down, he was taken prisoner in 1941 by a group of Italian soldiers near Benghazi, although he later turned the tables and took 130 Italians prisoner himself. He became Officer Commanding No. 511 Squadron in September 1945. After the war, he served as Officer Commanding the Royal Aircraft Establishment at Farnborough before becoming Station Commander at RAF Jever in 1955. He went on to be Air Officer Commanding No. 19 (Reconnaissance) Group in 1962 and Deputy Controller of Aircraft (RAF) at the Ministry of Aviation in 1964 before becoming Air Officer Commanding Far East Air Force in 1966 and retiring in 1969.

Hughes later advised the Singaporean government on military and civilian aviation matters. Following the Mount Erebus disaster, he consulted for the commission that was established to investigate the incident.

Military offices
Preceded by Sir Peter Wykeham	Commander-in-Chief Far East Air Force; 1966–1969	Succeeded by Sir Neil Wheeler
