= Lawrence Darvall =

Royal Air Force Air Marshal (1898–1968)

Sir Lawrence Darvall
- Born: 24 November 1898; Uxbridge, Middlesex, England
- Died: 17 November 1968 (aged 69); Surrey, England
- Military career
- Allegiance: United Kingdom
- Branch: British Army (1918–1921); Royal Air Force (1921–1956)
- Service years: 1918–1956
- Rank: Air Marshal
- Commands: RAF Hawkinge; RAF Andover; No. 2 Flying Instructors School; No. 46 Group; No. 216 Group; Air Headquarters Italy; No. 3 Group; No. 23 Group; Joint Services Staff College; NATO Defense College
- Conflicts: First World War; Second World War
- Awards: Knight Commander of the Order of the Bath; Military Cross

Air Marshal Sir Lawrence Darvall, KCB, MC (24 November 1898 – 17 November 1968) was a senior Royal Air Force officer.

== Early life ==
He was the second son of Richard Thomas Darvall and Annie Johnson, of Reading, Berkshire. One of his younger brothers was the politician and diplomat Frank Ongley Darvall (1906–1987), another was Alan Francis Darvall (1903–1983) who was headmaster of Wells House School in Malvern, Worcestershire from 1933 to 1968. The mountaineer, Margaret Darvall, was his sister.

== RAF career ==
After attending and later graduating from the Royal Military College, Sandhurst, Darvall was commissioned into the Green Howards on 16 August 1916 during the First World War and in 1917 he was awarded the Military Cross for gallantry in Macedonia.

After transferring to the RAF as a flying officer in 1919, he became officer commanding, RAF Hawkinge in April 1939. He served in the Second World War as officer commanding, RAF Andover from October 1939, officer commanding, No. 2 Flying Instructors School at RAF Cranwell from September 1940 and as Director of Air Transport Policy and Operations from 1943. He went on to be Air Officer Commanding, No. 46 Group in September 1944 and Air Officer Commanding, No. 216 Group in June 1945.

After the war he became Air Officer Commanding, Air Headquarters Italy in June 1946, Air Officer Commanding, No. 3 Group in March 1947 and Air Officer Commanding, Headquarters, RAF Flying Training Command in January 1949. After that he became Air Officer Commanding, No. 23 Group in February 1950, Commandant of the Joint Services Staff College in 1951 and Commandant of the NATO Defense College in Paris in November 1953 before retiring in April 1956.

After retiring from the services he became Chairman of Atlantic College's (UK Ltd) and, with Kurt Hahn, he was instrumental in founding Atlantic College, at St Donat's Castle, Glamorgan, the first of the United World Colleges.

He was granted the right to retain his rank of air marshal on his retirement.

Military offices
Preceded by Arthur Ledger	Air Officer Commanding No. 23 Group; 1950–1951	Succeeded by Allan Hesketh
