= Allan Hesketh =

Royal Air Force Air-Vice Marshal (1899-1973)

- Born: 5 July 1899
- Died: 9 March 1973 (aged 73)
- Military career
- Allegiance: United Kingdom
- Branch: Royal Air Force
- Service years: 1918–1954
- Rank: Air Vice Marshal
- Commands: No. 150 Squadron; No. 53 Base; No. 54 Base; No. 3 Group; No. 23 Group
- Conflicts: First World War; Second World War
- Awards: Companion of the Order of the Bath; Commander of the Order of the British Empire; Distinguished Flying Cross

Air Vice Marshal Allan Hesketh, CB, CBE, DFC (5 July 1899 – 9 March 1973) was a senior Royal Air Force officer.

== RAF career ==
Hesketh was commissioned into the Royal Air Force on 13 September 1918 during the First World War. He became officer commanding, No. 150 Squadron in March 1939 and served in the Second World War as base commander of No. 53 Base and then as base commander of No. 54 Base.

After the war he became Senior Air Staff Officer, No. 3 Group in December 1945, air attaché in Nanjing in October 1946 and Air Officer Commanding, No. 3 Group in December 1948. He went on to be Air Officer Commanding, No. 23 Group in September 1951 and Air Officer Commanding, Headquarters, RAF Flying Training Command in April 1952 before retiring in July 1954.

Military offices
Preceded by Lawrence Darvall	Air Officer Commanding No. 23 Group RAF; 1951–1952	Succeeded by Francis Long
Preceded by Lawrence Darvall	Air Officer Commanding No. 3 Group RAF; 1948–1951	Succeeded by W Brook
