= Arthur Ledger =

Royal Air Force Air-Vice Marshal (1897-1970)

- Born: 29 August 1897; Canterbury, Kent, England
- Died: 6 May 1970 (aged 72); Bridge, Kent, England
- Military career
- Allegiance: United Kingdom
- Branch: British Army (1918–1921); Royal Air Force (1921–1952)
- Service years: 1918–1952
- Rank: Air Vice Marshal
- Commands: No. 40 Squadron; No. 54 Group; No. 28 Group; No. 23 Group
- Conflicts: First World War; Second World War
- Awards: Companion of the Order of the Bath; Commander of the Order of the British Empire

Air Vice Marshal Arthur Percy Ledger, CB, CBE (29 August 1897 – 6 May 1970) was a senior Royal Air Force officer.

== RAF career ==
Ledger was commissioned into the Queen's Own Royal West Kent Regiment on 29 May 1918. He was deployed to France for service in the First World War.

After transferring to the RAF as an observer officer in 1919, he became officer commanding, No. 40 Squadron in August 1935 and then served in the Second World War as senior air officer, HQ Air Forces in India from July 1940, as Deputy Director of Ground Defence from March 1942 and as Director of Ground Defence from later that year.

He went on to be Air Officer Commanding, No. 54 Group in January 1946, Air Officer Commanding, No. 28 Group later that year and Air Officer Commanding, No. 23 Group in February 1947. His last appointment was as Air Officer Commanding, Headquarters, RAF Flying Training Command in February 1950.

In retirement he served as a Gentleman Usher to the Queen.

Military offices
Preceded by Frank Inglis	Air Officer Commanding No. 23 Group; 1947–1950	Succeeded by Lawrence Darvall
