= Osgood Hanbury =

British WWII flying ace (1917–1943)

- Born: 13 September 1917; Richmond, North Yorkshire
- Died: 3 June 1943 (aged 25); Bay of Biscay
- Military career
- Allegiance: United Kingdom
- Branch: Royal Air Force
- Service years: 1940–1943
- Rank: Squadron Leader
- Nickname: Pedro
- Service number: 81357
- Unit: No. 602 Squadron RAF (1940–41)
- Commands: No. 260 Squadron RAF (1942–43)
- Conflicts: Second World War: Battle of Britain; North African Campaign; Western Desert Campaign; Mediterranean theatre †
- Awards: Distinguished Service Order; Distinguished Flying Cross & Bar

Osgood Philip Villiers "Pedro" Hanbury, DSO, DFC & Bar (13 September 1917 – 3 June 1943) was a British Royal Air Force flying ace of the Second World War. He had scored 11 victories before he was killed in action in 1943.

== Early life ==
Hanbury was the son of Major Philip Hanbury and Dorothy Maud Margary. He was educated at Eton College and after training received a short service commission in the Royal Air Force (RAF) on 30 June 1940.

== Second World War ==
Hanbury initially served as a Westland Lysander pilot, carrying out liaison duties in the British Isles. On 3 September 1940, during the Battle of Britain, Hanbury volunteered to transfer to Fighter Command and was posted to No. 602 Squadron RAF. He soon scored several victories in aerial battles over the English Channel and southern England flying X4382, a late production Supermarine Spitfire Mk I. By the end of 1940 he had four confirmed victories.

Shortly before his transfer to No. 260 Squadron RAF, based in the Middle East and North Africa, where he operated Curtiss P-40 Warhawks, he was involved in an incident over the skies of Glasgow, during the Blitz. On the night of Thursday 13 March 1941 at 23.30hrs he disobeyed orders and got in a short burst at a German bomber from his night fighter. On 22 May 1942 he was awarded the Distinguished Flying Cross (DFC) after leading a defensive operation against an enemy air raid on Tobruk. On 23 June 1942 Hanbury became commanding officer of the squadron and was promoted to flight officer. On 28 July 1942 he received a Bar to his DFC for his leadership of No. 260 Squadron and his actions against the enemy. On 20 April 1943 he was awarded the Distinguished Service Order.

Hanbury was killed on 3 June 1943 while travelling as a passenger on a Lockheed Hudson of No. 117 Squadron RAF piloted by Robert Yaxley, which was shot down by a German aircraft over the Bay of Biscay. He had scored a total of 11 confirmed victories at the time of his death.

== Personal life ==
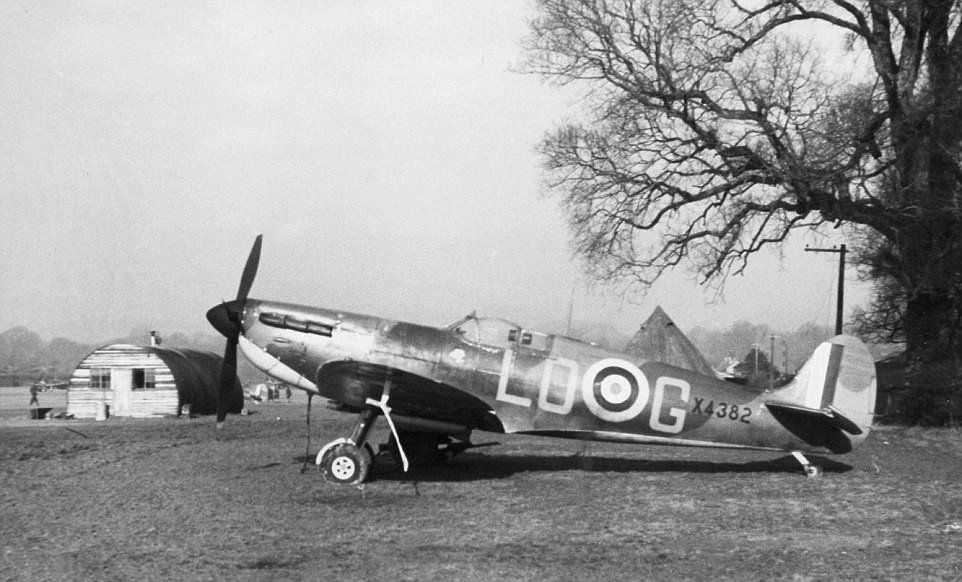
X4382, a late production Spitfire Mk I of No. 602 Squadron flown by Pilot Officer Osgood Hanbury, Westhampnett, September 1940

Eleven days before his death, Hanbury had married Patricia Cecil Harman, daughter of Charles Cecil Harman and Muriel Kathleen Marion Huth, on 22 May 1943. She gave birth to their son, Christopher Osgood Philip Hanbury, on 16 February 1944.

He is commemorated on the Air Forces Memorial. A biography about his war time experiences, Pedro: The life and death of Osgood Villiers Hanbury, DFC and Bar by Robin Rhoderick-Jones, was published in 2010.

== Citations ==
In April, 1942, this officer led a successful sortie against an enemy force of bombers, escorted by fighters, which attempted to raid Tobruk. At least 4 of the raiding aircraft were destroyed, of which Squadron Leader Hanbury destroyed 1. This officer continued to engage the enemy until his aircraft was so extensively damaged that he was compelled to land. Throughout, he displayed magnificent leadership and courage. Squadron Leader Hanbury has destroyed at least 5 enemy aircraft.

— Citation for Distinguished Flying Cross, London Gazette, Tuesday, 22 May 1943.

This officer continues to display outstanding skill, courage and fine leadership. Under his leadership his squadron has inflicted heavy losses on the enemy both in air combat and on the ground. During a recent sortie he led a formation as escort to our bombers, far behind the enemy lines, and heavy damage was caused. All our bombers returned safely.

— Citation for Bar to Distinguished Flying Cross, London Gazette, Tuesday, 28 July 1943.

This officer is an inspiring leader whose courageous example has contributed materially to the high standard of operational efficiency of the squadron he commands. In operations covering the great advance from El Alamein, Squadron Leader Hanbury led formations of aircraft with great skill, attacking and harassing the enemy with destructive effect. In attacks on the enemy's dispositions near Ksar Rhilane and at El Hamma, Squadron Leader Hanbury exhibited great dash. His fearlessness, efficiency and unswerving devotion to duty have been worthy of the highest praise.

— Citation for Distinguished Service Order, London Gazette, Tuesday, 30 April 1943.
