= Robert Yaxley =

Royal Air Force officer

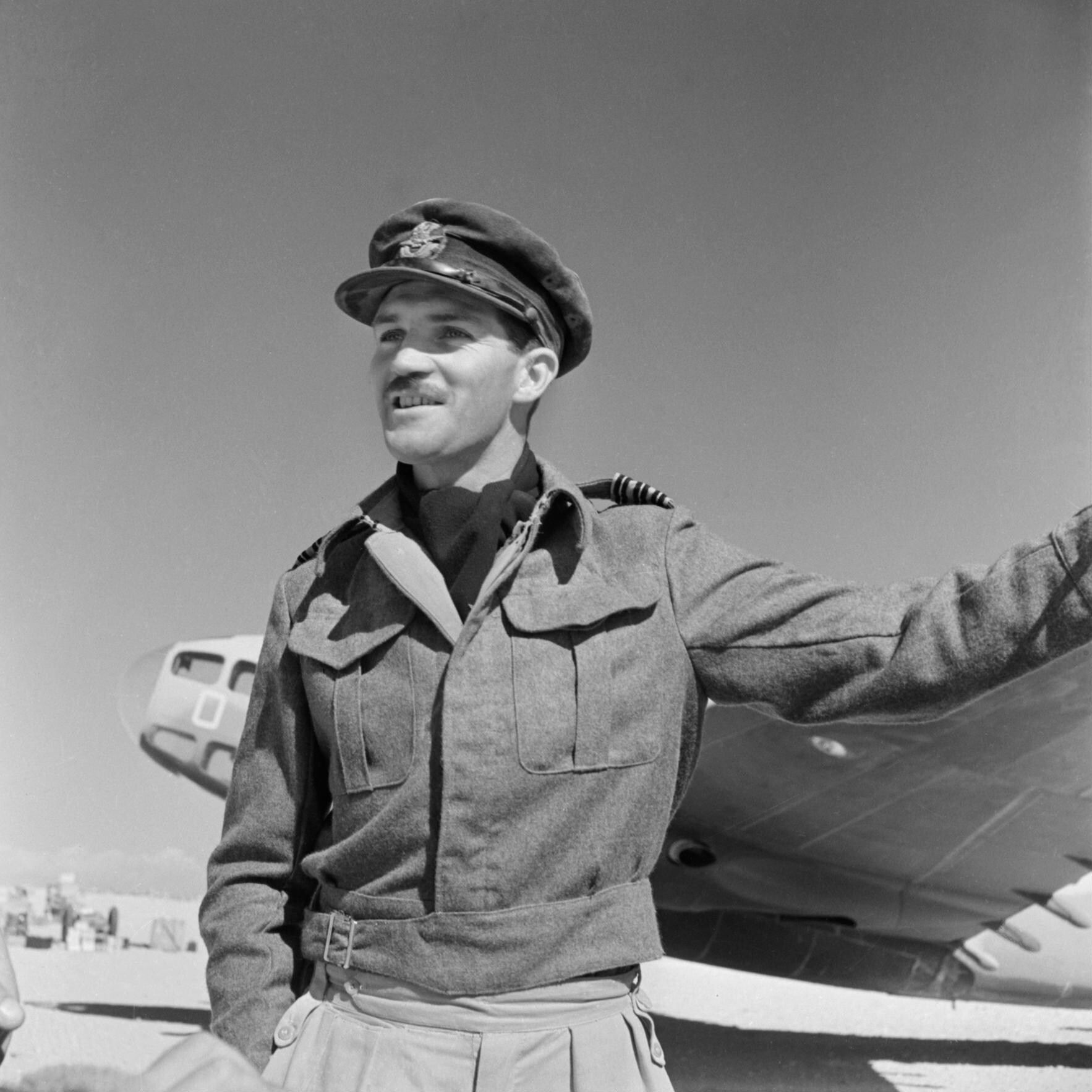
- Yaxley at El Adem, Libya in 1942
- Born: 1912; Bath, Somerset
- Died: 3 June 1943 (aged 30-31); Bay of Biscay
- Burial place: Body lost at sea
- Military career
- Allegiance: United Kingdom
- Branch: Royal Air Force
- Service years: 1934–1943
- Rank: Group Captain
- Service number: 33130
- Commands: No. 117 Squadron RAF (1942–43); No. 272 Squadron RAF (1941–42); No. 252 Squadron RAF (1940–41)
- Conflicts: Arab revolt in Palestine; Second World War: North African Campaign; Western Desert Campaign; Mediterranean theatre †
- Awards: Distinguished Service Order; Military Cross; Distinguished Flying Cross

Group Captain Robert Gordon Yaxley, DSO, MC, DFC (1912 – 3 June 1943) was a Royal Air Force pilot and commander during the Second World War.

== Early life ==
Yaxley was born in Bath, Somerset, the son of Robert and Agnes Elizabeth Yaxley. After attending the Royal Air Force College Cranwell, he was commissioned into the Royal Air Force (RAF) as a pilot officer on 4 September 1934, with seniority of 28 July 1934. He served with the RAF's No. 2 Armoured Car Company in the 1936–39 Arab revolt in Palestine, and was awarded the Military Cross on 6 November 1936. He had been promoted to the rank of flying officer on 28 January 1936.

== Second World War ==
At the beginning of the Second World War, Yaxley was serving with No. 252 Squadron RAF and by December 1940 he was the unit's commander. On 9 September 1941 he was promoted to wing commander, and took command of No. 272 Squadron, a unit equipped with Bristol Beaufighter heavy fighters. On 17 October 1941 Yaxley was awarded the Distinguished Flying Cross for his command of a raiding detachment of fighter aircraft. The citation for the award read:

This officer commanded a detachment of fighter aircraft which recently carried out a series of sorties with the object of assisting in the safe passage of our convoys in the Mediterranean. Attacks were made on certain aerodromes and seaplane bases which resulted in a loss to the enemy of at least 49 aircraft and a further 42 damaged. The successes achieved undoubtedly contributed largely to the fact that the convoys were able to proceed without loss; only 1 ship was damaged but it succeeded in reaching port. The courageous leadership and determination of this officer is worthy of the highest praise, and throughout he set an example which proved an inspiration to his fellow pilots.

This was followed by the award of the Distinguished Service Order on 12 December 1941 for his leadership in the Western Desert Campaign. The decoration was the first awarded during the campaign in Libya, and was announced with the following citation:

Since the operations in the Western Desert commenced this officer has led his squadron with conspicuous success. Enemy airdromes far west of the battle area as Benghazi, have been attacked daily and other serious damage has been inflicted on the enemy. On the opening day of the operations a number of Junkers 52 aircraft carrying troops were encountered and seven of them were shot down. In addition to a daily toll of enemy aircraft destroyed, heavy casualties have been inflicted on ground crews, while lines of communication have been harassed and petrol tankers set on fire. Altogether, within a space of six days operations, no fewer than 46 of the enemy's aircraft were destroyed. Much of the brilliant success achieved can be attributed to the courageous leadership and determination displayed by Wing Commander Yaxley. Throughout he has set a magnificent example.

On 8 July 1942 Yaxley became commanding officer of No. 117 Squadron and under his leadership the unit began to play a big part in the advance from El Alamein.

On 3 June 1943, Yaxley was killed while piloting a Lockheed Hudson over the Bay of Biscay en route to North Africa. His plane, carrying several passengers including Osgood Hanbury, was shot down by a German Junkers Ju 88 C flown by Lieutenant Hans Olbrecht.
