= Lydford (disambiguation) =

Lydford may refer to:

== Geographical ==
- Lydford, A village in Devon.
  - Lydford railway station
  - Lydford Gorge, a gorge on the River Lyd (Devon) near Lydford
- Lydford-on-Fosse, a village in Somerset

== Biographical ==
- Harold Lydford, Royal Air Force air marshal
