= William Coles (RAF officer) =

Royal Air Force air marshal (1913–1979)

Sir William Coles
- Born: 26 July 1913
- Died: 7 June 1979 (aged 65)
- Allegiance: United Kingdom
- Branch: Royal Air Force
- Service years: 1938–1968
- Rank: Air Marshal
- Commands: Technical Training Command (1966–68); No. 23 (Training) Group (1960–63); RAF Middleton St. George (1950–51); No. 233 Squadron (1944–45); No. 117 Squadron (1943–44)
- Conflicts: Second World War
- Awards: Knight Commander of the Order of the British Empire; Companion of the Order of the Bath; Distinguished Service Order; Distinguished Flying Cross & Bar; Air Force Cross; Distinguished Flying Cross (United States)

Air Marshal Sir William Edward Coles KBE, CB, DSO, DFC & Bar, AFC (26 July 1913 – 7 June 1979) was a Royal Air Force officer who served as Air Officer Commanding-in-Chief Technical Training Command from 1966 to 1968. Coles was also a British bobsledder who competed in the late 1940s as part of an RAF team.

== RAF career ==
Coles joined the Royal Air Force in 1938. He served in the Second World War as Officer Commanding No. 117 Squadron and as Officer Commanding No. 233 Squadron. After the war he became a Staff Officer at the Air Ministry before joining the Central Flying School. He was appointed Station Commander at RAF Middleton St. George in 1950, Chief Flying Instructor at the Central Flying School in 1951 and Air Adviser to the High Commissioner to Australia in 1953. He went on to be Senior Air Staff Officer at Headquarters No. 3 (Bomber) Group in 1957, Air Officer Commanding No. 23 (Training) Group in 1960 and Director-General of RAF Personal Services in 1963. His last appointment was as Air Officer Commanding-in-Chief Technical Training Command in 1966 before retiring in 1968.

He was the subject of This Is Your Life in 1974 when he was surprised by Eamonn Andrews.

In retirement he became President of the Not Forgotten Association and Controller of the RAF Benevolent Fund.

== Sport ==
At the 1948 Winter Olympics in St. Moritz, he finished fifth in the two-man and seventh in the four-man events.

Military offices
Preceded by Colin Scragg	Air Officer Commanding No. 23 Group; 1960–1963	Succeeded by Peter Philpott
Preceded by Sir Donald Evans	Air Officer Commanding-in-Chief Technical Training Command; 1966–1968	Command disbanded
