= Henry Graham (RAF officer) =

Royal Air Force Air-Vice Marshal (1910-1987)

- Born: 28 March 1910
- Died: 14 February 1987 (aged 76)
- Military career
- Allegiance: United Kingdom
- Branch: Royal Air Force
- Service years: 1924–1958
- Rank: Air Vice Marshal
- Commands: No. 7 Squadron; RAF Wyton; RAF Kirmington; No. 23 Group
- Conflicts: Second World War
- Awards: Companion of the Order of the Bath; Commander of the Order of the British Empire; Distinguished Service Order; Distinguished Flying Cross

Air Vice Marshal Henry Rudolph Graham, CB, CBE, DSO, DFC (28 March 1910 – 14 February 1987) was a senior Royal Air Force officer.

== RAF career ==
Graham was commissioned into the Royal Air Force on 10 April 1931. He served in the Second World War as officer commanding, No. 7 Squadron from April 1941, Command Navigation Officer at Headquarters RAF Bomber Command from July 1942 and as officer commanding, RAF Wyton from June 1943 before becoming officer commanding, RAF Kirmington from October 1943.

After the war he became Head of Flying Control, Headquarters RAF Transport Command in July 1945, Director of Operations in April 1952 and Air Officer Commanding, No. 23 Group in January 1956. His last appointment was as Air Officer Administration at RAF Flying Training Command in January 1958 before retiring in April 1962.

Military offices
Preceded by George Harvey	Air Officer Commanding No. 23 Group; 1956–1958	Succeeded by Colin Scragg
