= Harry Burton (RAF officer) =

Royal Air Force Air Marshal (1919-1994)

Sir Harry Burton
- Burton in 1967
- Born: 2 May 1919; Rutherglen, Scotland
- Died: 29 November 1994 (aged 75)
- Military career
- Allegiance: United Kingdom
- Branch: Royal Air Force
- Service years: 1937–1973
- Rank: Air Marshal
- Commands: No. 46 Group (1972–73); RAF Air Support Command (1970–72); No. 23 Group (1967–70); RAF Scampton (1960–63); No. 238 Squadron (1945–46); No. 242 Squadron (1945)
- Conflicts: Second World War
- Awards: Knight Commander of the Order of the Bath; Commander of the Order of the British Empire; Distinguished Service Order; Mentioned in Despatches

Air Marshal Sir Harry Burton KCB, CBE, DSO (2 May 1919 – 29 November 1994) was a Royal Air Force officer who became Air-Officer-Commanding-in-Chief of RAF Air Support Command.

== RAF career ==
Born in Rutherglen (Lanarkshire), Scotland and educated at the High School of Glasgow, Burton joined the Royal Air Force in 1937. During the Second World War, he served as a pilot with No. 215 Squadron and then No. 149 Squadron before being shot down over the Black Forest and taken prisoner of war. He escaped from Stalag Luft I (Barth, Germany), making his way to neutral Sweden before being returned to Scotland, and is believed to be the first British POW escapee of WWII to have successfully made it back home; later in the war, he was appointed Officer Commanding No. 242 Squadron and then No. 238 Squadron.

After the war, he was seconded to the Indian Air Force before becoming Group Captain responsible for Organisation at Headquarters RAF Bomber Command in 1958 and then Station Commander at RAF Scampton in 1960. Having been deputy commander of a display squadron for the 1962 Commonwealth Games in Perth, Australia, he was made Senior Air Staff Officer at Headquarters No. 3 Group in 1963, Air Executive to the Deputy for Nuclear Affairs at Supreme Headquarters Allied Powers Europe in 1965 and Air Officer Commanding No. 23 (Training) Group in 1967. He went on to be Air-Officer-Commanding-in-Chief of RAF Air Support Command in 1970, in which capacity he opened the now disbanded Southend Aircraft Museum, and Air Officer Commanding No. 46 Group and received his knighthood in 1971 before retiring in 1973.

Military offices
| Preceded by Michael Lyne | Air Officer Commanding No. 23 Group; 1967–1970 | Succeeded by Harold Bird-Wilson |
| Preceded by Sir Lewis Hodges | Air Officer Commander-in-Chief Air Support Command; 1970–1972 | Succeeded by Command disbanded |
