= Douglas Harries =

English cricketer and military officer

- Born: 30 March 1893; Sidcup, Kent, England
- Died: 6 December 1972 (aged 79); Crondall, Hampshire, England
- Military career
- Allegiance: United Kingdom
- Branch: Royal Navy (1913–1919); Royal Naval Air Service (1915–1919); Royal Air Force (1919–1946)
- Service years: 1913–1946
- Rank: Air vice-marshal
- Commands: Polegate Airship Station; RAF Ramlah; RAF Amman; Head of the Intelligence Branch; RAF Cranwell; No. 23 (Training) Group
- Conflicts: First World War; Second World War
- Awards: Air Force Cross

Sir Douglas Harries KCB AFC (30 March 1893 – 6 December 1972) was an English first-class cricketer and an officer in the Royal Navy and the Royal Air Force. Harries began his military career with the Royal Navy, serving in the early stages of the First World War with the navy. He was seconded to the Royal Naval Air Service in 1915, serving mainly with airships. Following the war, he was permanently transferred to the Royal Air Force in 1919. He served with the Royal Air Force until the end of the Second World War, retiring as an air vice-marshal in 1946. Outside of his military career, Harries played first-class cricket for the Free Foresters.

== Early life and military career ==
Harries was born at Sidcup and attended the Britannia Royal Naval College, graduating into the Royal Navy as a midshipman. After graduating he served aboard HMS Defence, HMS Indomitable, HMS Dryad, and HMS Collingwood. By October 1913, he had been promoted to the rank of sub-lieutenant.

He served during the early stages of the First World War with the Royal Navy, before being seconded to the Royal Naval Air Service, where he was the commanding officer of Polegate Airship Station in 1915. He was promoted from the rank of flight lieutenant to flight commander in July 1916. By February 1917, he was a squadron commander at RNAS Kingsnorth. In August 1917, he was decorated by Italy with the Order of Saints Maurice and Lazarus. He was seconded to the Airship Branch in April 1918, and was appointed to the Air Ministry as a staff officer in June of the same year. He was awarded the Air Force Cross in the 1919 New Year Honours.

== Royal Air Force service ==
Following the end of the war, Harries was awarded a permanent commission in the Royal Air Force (RAF) in August 1919, at which point he was granted the rank of squadron leader. With this permanent commission, he was removed from the Royal Navy list. He played first-class cricket for the Free Foresters, making two appearances each in both 1919 and 1920, scoring 112 runs with a high score of 34. In July 1920 he was based at RAF Howden in Yorkshire, serving at the base until it was disbanded in 1921. He was promoted to the rank of wing commander in January 1926 and the following month he was posted to an RAF depot in Egypt. He was appointed as head of the Intelligence Branch at the Directorate of Military Intelligence in 1930, before serving at the commanding officer of RAF Ramlah in Mandatory Palestine and RAF Amman in Transjordan in 1935 and 1936 respectively. He was promoted to the rank of group captain in July 1935, before being promoted to the rank of air commodore in November 1938.

Shortly before the outbreak of the Second World War, Harries was the air officer commanding RAF Cranwell. He was the air officer commanding No. 23 (Training) Group in January 1942, succeeding Keith Park. The following month he was made an acting air vice-marshal. He was made an MBE in the 1943 New Year Honours. He was promoted to the rank of air vice-marshal in November 1944. Following the war, he retired from active service in August 1946, in addition to being made a Knights Commander of the Order of the British Empire in the 1947 New Year Honours. He died in December 1972 at Crondall, Hampshire.
