= James Grant (RAF airman) =

Scottish flying ace

- Born: 30 January 1899; Kilfinan, Argyll, Scotland
- Military career
- Allegiance: United Kingdom
- Branch: Royal Air Force
- Rank: Sergeant
- Unit: No. 57 Squadron RAF
- Awards: Distinguished Flying Medal

Sergeant James Grant DFM (30 January 1899 – ) was a Scottish flying ace credited with eight aerial victories during World War I. The teenage non-commissioned officer was a rarity among aces. While most were commissioned officers and fighter pilots, he was an observer and gunner aboard a bomber. Nonetheless, his accuracy with a machine gun and his doughtiness led to his being awarded the Distinguished Flying Medal when he was only 18 years old.

== Early life ==
Grant was born at the Ballimore estate, Kilfinan, Argyll, Scotland, in 1899, the son of Simon Grant, a gardener, and Agnes McLeod Grant. He was living in Sandbank, Argyll when he enlisted into military service.

== World War I heroism ==
James Grant had gained the rank of Sergeant Mechanic with No. 57 Squadron RAF when he flew as an observer/gunner from March to September 1918 in the squadron's Airco DH.4 light bombers. The squadron was stationed at Le Quesnoy, France at that time, and was tasked with photo reconnaissance sorties and bombing missions. It was dangerous work, with a high casualty rate.

On 10 June 1918, Grant began the valourous actions that brought him recognition in Royal Air Force communiqués. While being piloted by Lieutenant C. W. Peckham on a bombing raid to Bapaume, France, they were attacked by eight German Fokkers. At 2010 hours, between Grévillers and Vimy, Grant shot down an attacking Triplane in flames. Fifteen minutes later, he destroyed another Dreidecker.

Nine days later, at 1930 hours, Sergeant Grant was being flown over Bapaume by Lieutenant J. T. Kirkham when a Pfalz D.III attacked. Grant and another air crew made up of Lieutenant Claud Stokes and Corporal J. H. Bowler caught the German fighter in a crossfire; it fell out of control.

On 14 August, while flying as a gunner with Lieutenant E. M. Coles, Grant shot down a Fokker D.VII that was on their tail. The British bomber was returning from a raid. Although the pursuit plane was destroyed over Roisel, in an early use of a parachute, the German pilot bailed out.

On 1 September 1918, 57 Squadron was out on another bombing mission with Lieutenant Cole when they were attacked by a score of German fighters. Grant destroyed another Fokker D.VII over Cambrai, France at 1400 hours. Grant was now an ace, having scored five victories for three different pilots. Three days later, while manning the guns for Captain Andrew MacGregor, the shooting sergeant sent another Fokker D.VII down out of control into Bourlon Woods at 10 in the morning. The next day, Grant was still teamed with MacGregor. They flew two missions that day. At 1125 hours, west of Marcoing, France, Grant destroyed his third Fokker D.VII. At 1605, he destroyed his fourth D.VII west of Avesnes-le-Sec. One of that day's vanquished Fokkers burst into fire; the pilot leaped out. No parachute was spotted. Evidently, the German aviator preferred death by fall rather than by flame.

== Post World War I ==
Grant's courage and marksmanship earned him a Distinguished Flying Medal. Although the award date is unknown, it was gazetted in the London Gazette of 29 November 1918. As the citation read:

100425 Sergt.-Mech. James Grant

A gallant and capable non-commissioned officer who has accounted for six enemy aeroplanes. On 1 September, whilst on a bomb raid his formation was attacked by fifteen Fokker biplanes and five triplanes. In the severe fighting that ensued Sergt. Grant served his gun with exceptional skill, crashing one enemy machine, and it was largely due to his good shooting that the enemy were eventually driven off.

On 30 April 1991, Grant's Distinguished Flying Medal was auctioned at Christie's selling for £770 sterling.

== See also ==
- Aerial victory standards of World War I
