= Peter Philpott (RAF officer) =

Royal Air Force Air-Vice Marshal (1915-1988)

- Born: 20 March 1915
- Died: 13 July 1988 (aged 73)
- Military career
- Allegiance: United Kingdom
- Branch: Royal Air Force
- Service years: 1935–1970
- Rank: Air Vice Marshal
- Commands: RAF Horsham St Faith; RAF Deversoir; No. 23 Group
- Conflicts: Second World War
- Awards: Companion of the Order of the Bath; Commander of the Order of the British Empire

Air Vice Marshal Peter Theodore Philpott, CB, CBE (20 March 1915 – 13 July 1988) was a senior Royal Air Force officer.

== RAF career ==
Philpott was commissioned into the Royal Air Force on 27 July 1935. He served in the Second World War in the Directorate of Operational Training and then as officer commanding, RAF Horsham St Faith.

After the war he became officer commanding, RAF Deversoir in 1952, Deputy Director of Policy in 1954 and Director of Policy (Air Staff) in 1958. He went on to be Director of Joint Plans in 1960, senior member of the RAF Directing Staff at the Imperial Defence College in 1961 and Air Officer Commanding, No. 23 Group in August 1963. After that he became Head of British Defence Liaison Staff in Canberra in 1965 and Director of Service Intelligence in 1968 before retiring in 1970.

Military offices
Preceded by William Coles	Air Officer Commanding No. 23 Group; 1963–1965	Succeeded by Michael Lyne
