= Michael Lyne =

Royal Air Force Air-Vice Marshal (1919-1997)

- Born: 23 March 1919
- Died: 21 December 1997 (aged 78)
- Military career
- Allegiance: United Kingdom
- Branch: Royal Air Force
- Service years: 1935–1970
- Rank: Air Vice Marshal
- Commands: No. 54 Squadron; RAF Wildenrath; Royal Air Force College Cranwell; No. 23 Group
- Conflicts: Second World War
- Awards: Companion of the Order of the Bath; Air Force Cross & Two Bars

Air Vice Marshal Michael Dillon Lyne, CB, AFC & Two Bars (23 March 1919 – 21 December 1997) was a senior Royal Air Force officer.

== RAF career ==
Lyne was commissioned into the Royal Air Force on 29 July 1939. He served in the Second World War as officer commanding the Air Gunnery School in Egypt and on the Air Staff at Headquarters RAF Mediterranean and Middle East.

After the war he became officer commanding, No. 54 Squadron in 1946, chief flying instructor at the RAF Flying College at Manby in 1954 and officer commanding, RAF Wildenrath in 1958. He went on to be air attaché in Moscow in 1961, commandant of the Royal Air Force College Cranwell in 1963 and Air Officer Commanding, No. 23 Group in 1965. After that he became senior member of the RAF Directing Staff at the Imperial Defence College in 1968 and Director-General of RAF Training in 1970 before retiring in 1971.

Military offices
Preceded by Peter Philpott	Air Officer Commanding No. 23 Group; 1965–1967	Succeeded by Harry Burton
