= Lewis Hodges =

Royal Air Force Air Chief Marshal (1918–2007)

Sir Lewis Hodges
- Nickname: "Bob"
- Born: 1 March 1918; Richmond, England
- Died: 4 January 2007 (aged 88)
- Allegiance: United Kingdom
- Branch: Royal Air Force
- Service years: 1937–1976
- Rank: Air Chief Marshal
- Commands: Air Member for Personnel (1970–1973); Air Support Command (1968–1970); RAF Marham (1956–1959); No. 357 (Special Duties) Squadron (1944–1945); No. 161 (Special Duties) Squadron (1943–1944)
- Conflicts: Second World War: European theatre; South-East Asian theatre
- Awards: Knight Commander of the Order of the Bath; Commander of the Order of the British Empire; Distinguished Service Order & Bar; Distinguished Flying Cross & Bar; Mentioned in Despatches; Grand Officer of the Legion of Honour (France); Croix de guerre (France)

Air Chief Marshal Sir Lewis Macdonald Hodges, KCB, CBE, DSO & Bar, DFC & Bar, DL (1 March 1918 – 4 January 2007) was a pilot for Special Operations Executive (SOE) in the Second World War, and later achieved high command in the Royal Air Force and NATO.

== Early life ==
Hodges was born in Richmond in Surrey, England. He was educated at St Paul's School in Barnes and joined the Royal Air Force College Cranwell in 1937.

== War service ==
Known as "Bob" Hodges, he was commissioned into the RAF as a pilot officer in December 1938, joining Bomber Command and flying Vickers Wellesleys with No. 78 Squadron at RAF Finningley, and then moving to fly Handley Page Hampdens with No. 49 Squadron in 1940. On 4 September 1940, his aircraft was damaged in an air raid on Stettin, and he crash-landed in Brittany. He and a gunner named John Hugh Wyatt who had not bailed out attempted to escape to Spain, but were arrested by the Vichy police near Marseille. He escaped from custody at Saint-Hippolyte-du-Fort, near Nîmes, and crossed the Pyrenees into Spain, only to be arrested and imprisoned at Miranda del Ebro. He was eventually released some weeks later, reaching Gibraltar and then returning to England in June 1941.

He was awarded the Distinguished Flying Cross (DFC) in May 1942, while commanding a flight of No. 49 Squadron, for operations including attacks on the German small battleships Scharnhorst and Gneisenau in February 1942. He was mentioned in despatches in June 1942. Wing Commander Charles Pickard invited him to join No. 161 (Special Duties) Squadron at RAF Tempsford later in 1942, commanding a flight of Armstrong Whitworth Whitleys and Handley Page Halifaxes on SOE operations. He became the commander of No. 161 Squadron in May 1943, and was promoted to squadron leader. In addition to other operations, such as parachute drops, he landed Westland Lysanders and Lockheed Hudsons in occupied France several times, bringing Vincent Auriol and François Mitterrand back to England. Unaware of their identities at the time, the former made him a Commandeur of the Légion d'Honneur in 1950, and the latter a Grand Officier of the Légion d'Honneur in 1988. For his actions with SOE, he received a Bar to his DFC in May 1943, and the Distinguished Service Order in October 1943. He was also awarded the French Croix de guerre.

He attended the RAF Staff College in 1944, and served with the Bomber Command operations staff. He was selected to serve in the Far East as a staff officer to Air Chief Marshal Sir Trafford Leigh-Mallory. However, he requested a return to active service after his younger brother was killed, and took command of No. 357 (Special Duties) Squadron at RAF Jessore near Calcutta in December 1944, flying Liberators, Dakotas and Lysanders in support of SOE's Force 136 in Burma and other resistance groups in Thailand and Malaya. Fortunately for Hodges, this meant that he did not fly to India with Leigh-Mallory: the aircraft crashed in the Alps, killing all on board. Hodges received a Bar to his DSO in October 1945 for his services in the Far East.

== Post-war ==
After the war, he joined the RAF Staff College in Haifa in 1945, and then the Joint Services Staff College at Latimer in 1947, before a stint at the Air Ministry from 1949 to 1952, and then at Bomber Command. He was promoted to wing commander in 1950. He commanded the RAF team of three Canberras in the London to New Zealand Air Race in October 1953. He was in the lead until he suffered from engine problems, and ended fourth. He commanded RAF Marham from 1956, while the RAF was converted to V bombers. He received an Officer of the Order of the British Empire in 1953, became a group captain in 1957, and advanced to Commander of the Order of the British Empire in 1958. He was Assistant Commandant of the RAF College in Cranwell from 1959 to 1961, and became an air commodore in 1961. He attended the Imperial Defence College in 1963, was promoted to air vice marshal, and appointed a Companion of the Order of the Bath, and then served at SHAPE headquarters. He was promoted to air marshal in 1968, and advanced to Knight Commander of the Order of the Bath. After serving as Assistant Chief of the Air Staff (Operations) from 1965, Air Officer Commanding-in-Chief at Air Support Command from 1968 and Air Member for Personnel from 1970, he was promoted to air chief marshal in 1971. He served as NATO Deputy Commander-in-Chief Allied Forces Central Europe and as Air Aide-de-Camp to the Queen from 1973 to 1976.

He retired from the RAF in 1976. He was a director of Pilkington Brothers (optical division) from 1979 to 1983, and a governor of Bupa from 1987. He served as chairman of the governors of the Duke of Kent School and of the education committee of the RAF Benevolent Fund from 1979 to 1986. He was also as president of the Royal Air Forces Escaping Society from 1979 to 1995, of the Royal Air Force Association from 1981 to 1984, and also of the Special Forces Club and the RAF Club. An account of his wartime service for SOE was published in Royal Air Force at War in 1983.

He lived near Sevenoaks in Kent, and became a Deputy Lieutenant of Kent in 1992. He was survived by his wife, Elisabeth Blackett. They were married in 1950, and had two sons together.

Military offices
Preceded by Sir Thomas Prickett	Air Officer Commander-in-Chief Air Support Command; 1968–1970	Succeeded by Sir Harry Burton
Preceded by Sir Andrew Humphrey	Air Member for Personnel; 1970–1973	Succeeded by Sir Harold Martin
Preceded by Sir Frederick Rosier	Deputy C-in-C HQ Allied Forces Central Europe; 1973–1976	Succeeded by Sir Peter Le Cheminant
