= Francis Long (RAF officer) =

Royal Air Force Air-Vice Marshal (1899-1983)

- Born: 10 October 1899
- Died: 25 March 1983 (aged 83)
- Military career
- Allegiance: United Kingdom
- Branch: Royal Air Force
- Service years: 1918–1953
- Rank: Air Vice Marshal
- Commands: No. 1 (Indian) Group; No. 23 Group
- Conflicts: First World War; Second World War
- Awards: Companion of the Order of the Bath

Air Vice Marshal Francis William Long, CB, DL (10 October 1899 – 25 March 1983) was a senior Royal Air Force officer.

== RAF career ==
Long was commissioned into the Royal Flying Corps on 23 February 1918 during the First World War. After transferring to the RAF on its creation in April 1918, he served in the Second World War as Senior Air Staff Officer, Combined Operations Headquarters from April 1943, Senior Air Staff Officer, Air Headquarters India from March 1945 and as Air Officer Commanding, No. 1 (Indian) Group from August 1945.

After the war he became Director of Ground Combat Training in August 1947, Director of Operations in November 1948 and Senior Air Staff Officer, HQ Middle East Air Force in December 1949. He went on to be Air Officer Commanding, No. 23 Group in April 1952 before retiring in November 1953.

Military offices
Preceded by Allan Hesketh	Air Officer Commanding No. 23 Group; 1952–1953	Succeeded by George Harvey
