= Andrew MacGregor =

Scottish flying ace

- Born: 26 October 1897; Glen Gyle, Scotland
- Died: 24 October 1983 (aged 85); Glen Gyle, Scotland
- Military career
- Allegiance: United Kingdom
- Branch: British Army (1917–1918); Royal Air Force (1918–1949)
- Service years: 1917–1949
- Rank: Air Vice Marshal
- Commands: No. 28 Group (1945–1946); RAF Abbotsinch (1937–1938)
- Conflicts: First World War; Arab revolt in Palestine; Second World War
- Awards: Companion of the Order of the Bath; Commander of the Order of the British Empire; Distinguished Flying Cross; Mentioned in Despatches (4); Officer of the Legion of Merit (United States); Commander of the Order of the Crown (Belgium)

Air Vice Marshal Andrew MacGregor, CB, CBE, DFC (25 October 1897 – 24 October 1983) was a Scottish First World War flying ace credited with six aerial victories—including three scored with James Grant as his gunner—and a senior commander in the Royal Air Force during the Second World War.

== Early life ==
Andrew MacGregor was born in Glen Gyle, Crieff, Scotland on 25 October 1897.

== Military service ==
=== First World War ===
Andrew MacGregor entered military service on 26 April 1917 as an officer in the Argyll and Sutherland Highlanders. He transferred to the Royal Flying Corps (Note: Which would combine with the Royal Naval Air Service on 1 April 1918 to become the Royal Air Force.) on 30 November 1917. He served as an Airco DH.4 pilot in No. 57 Squadron RFC until he was appointed a Flight Commander with a temporary rank of captain on 1 May 1918. From 31 July to 5 September 1918, MacGregor was credited with six aerial victories.

== Between the world wars ==
MacGregor was released from duty on 23 May 1919. However, on 1 August 1919, he was given a commission in the Royal Air Force, although as a lieutenant instead of captain. He would serve as a pilot in Iraq, Kurdistan, and Egypt until 12 June 1924. On that date, he began staff duties as a military intelligence officer at HQ Iraq.

MacGregor began study at the Royal Air Force Staff College on 19 September 1927. After that, his career upwards began, as he rotated through increasingly responsible positions. On 1 September 1938, he was appointed Assistant Director, Deputy Directorate of War Organisation.

== Service in Second World War ==
On 19 November 1940, MacGregor was posted as Senior Air Staff Officer to Headquarters, No. 4 Bomber Group. On 1 March 1943, he was assigned to North West African Air Forces.

MacGregor moved to Air Staff, Mediterranean Allied Air Forces on 29 January 1944. Later that year, he moved to become assistant commandant of the RAF Staff College. He was appointed Air Officer Commanding of No. 28 Bomber Group on 23 February 1945.

== Later life ==
MacGregor reported to Headquarters Fighter Command on 4 July 1946 for his final assignment. He retired from military service on 9 September 1949, having attained the rank of Air Vice Marshal.

He returned to his native Crieff, living there until he died in the nearby Perth Royal Infirmary on 24 October 1983.

== Awards and decorations ==
- Distinguished Flying Cross: 5 April 1919
- Mentioned in Dispatches: 28 October 1921, 23 July 1937, 1 January 1943, 2 June 1943
- Member of the Order of the British Empire: 3 June 1932
- French Legion d'Honneur: 1944
- Officer of the American Legion of Merit: 11 April 1944
- Commander of the Order of the British Empire: 9 June 1944
- Commander of the Order of the Crown of Belgium: 25 June 1948
- Companion of the Order of the Bath: 9 June 1949
- Croix de guerre

== Promotions ==
- Lieutenant: 1 April 1918
- Captain: 1 May 1918
- Flying Officer; 1 August 1919 (seniority from 1 April 1918)
- Flight Lieutenant: 1 January 1924
- Squadron Leader: 1 December 1932
- Wing Commander (rank): 1 July 1937
- Temporary Group Captain: 1 June 1940
- Temporary Air Commodore: 1 June 1942
- Group Captain: 20 November 1942 (seniority from 1 April 1942)
- Acting Air Vice Marshal: 4 July 1946
- Air Commodore: 1 October 1946
- Air Vice Marshal: 8 September 1949

== Bibliography ==
- Franks, Norman; Guest, Russell; Alegi, Gregory (2008). Above The War Fronts: A Complete Record of the British Two-seater Bomber Pilot and Observer Aces, the British Two-seater Fighter Observer Aces, and the Belgian, Italian, Austro-Hungarian and Russian Fighter Aces, 1914-1918. Grub Street Publishing. ISBN 1898697566, ISBN 978-1898697565
