= Colin Scragg =

Royal Air Force Air-Vice Marshal (1908–1989)

Sir Colin Scragg
- Born: 8 September 1908
- Died: 5 April 1989 (aged 80)
- Military career
- Allegiance: United Kingdom
- Branch: Royal Air Force
- Rank: Air Vice Marshal
- Commands: No. 166 Squadron; No. 23 Group
- Conflicts: Second World War
- Awards: Knight Commander of the Order of the British Empire; Companion of the Order of the Bath; Air Force Cross & Bar

Air Vice Marshal Sir Colin Scragg, KBE, CB, AFC & Bar (8 September 1908 – 5 April 1989) was a senior Royal Air Force officer.

== RAF career ==
Scragg was commissioned from the rank of flight sergeant on 24 February 1938. He served in the Second World War as officer commanding, No. 166 Squadron from December 1943 before being shot down over Germany and becoming a prisoner of war in January 1944.

After the war he became deputy director of Operational Requirements in 1950, Director of Operational Requirements in November 1955 and Air Officer Commanding, No. 23 Group in December 1958. His last appointment was as Deputy Controller Aircraft at the Ministry of Aviation in 1960 before retiring in September 1964.

Military offices
Preceded by Henry Graham	Air Officer Commanding No. 23 Group; 1958–1960	Succeeded by William Coles
