= 28 Squadron SAAF =

28 Squadron
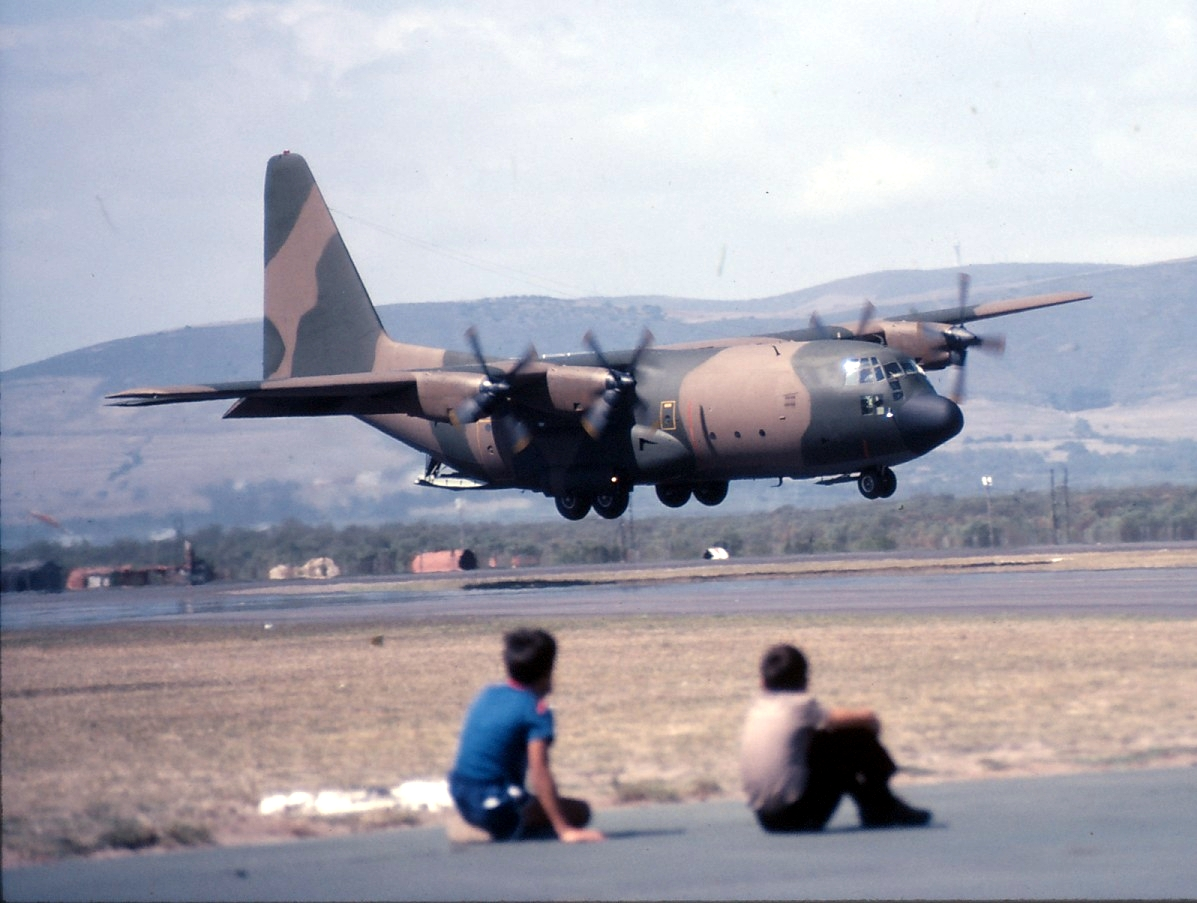
- C-130BZ as operated by 28 Squadron
- Active: 1943–present
- Country: South Africa
- Branch: South African Air Force
- Role: Medium Transport
- Garrison/HQ: AFB Waterkloof
- Motto: "Portamus" (We Carry)
- Equipment: C-130BZ/F Hercules

Insignia
- Squadron Crest

28 Squadron SAAF is a squadron of the South African Air Force. It is a medium transport squadron flying Lockheed C-130BZ Hercules medium transport aircraft.

- First formed: 1 June 1943 (at Almaza, Egypt). The squadron flew Dakota DC3's as part of No. 216 Group RAF of the Mediterranean Allied Air Forces in May 1945.

== Aircraft ==
Aircraft flown by 28 Squadron
Note: Aircraft type photographs may not necessarily represent aircraft of the same mark or actual aircraft belonging to the squadron.
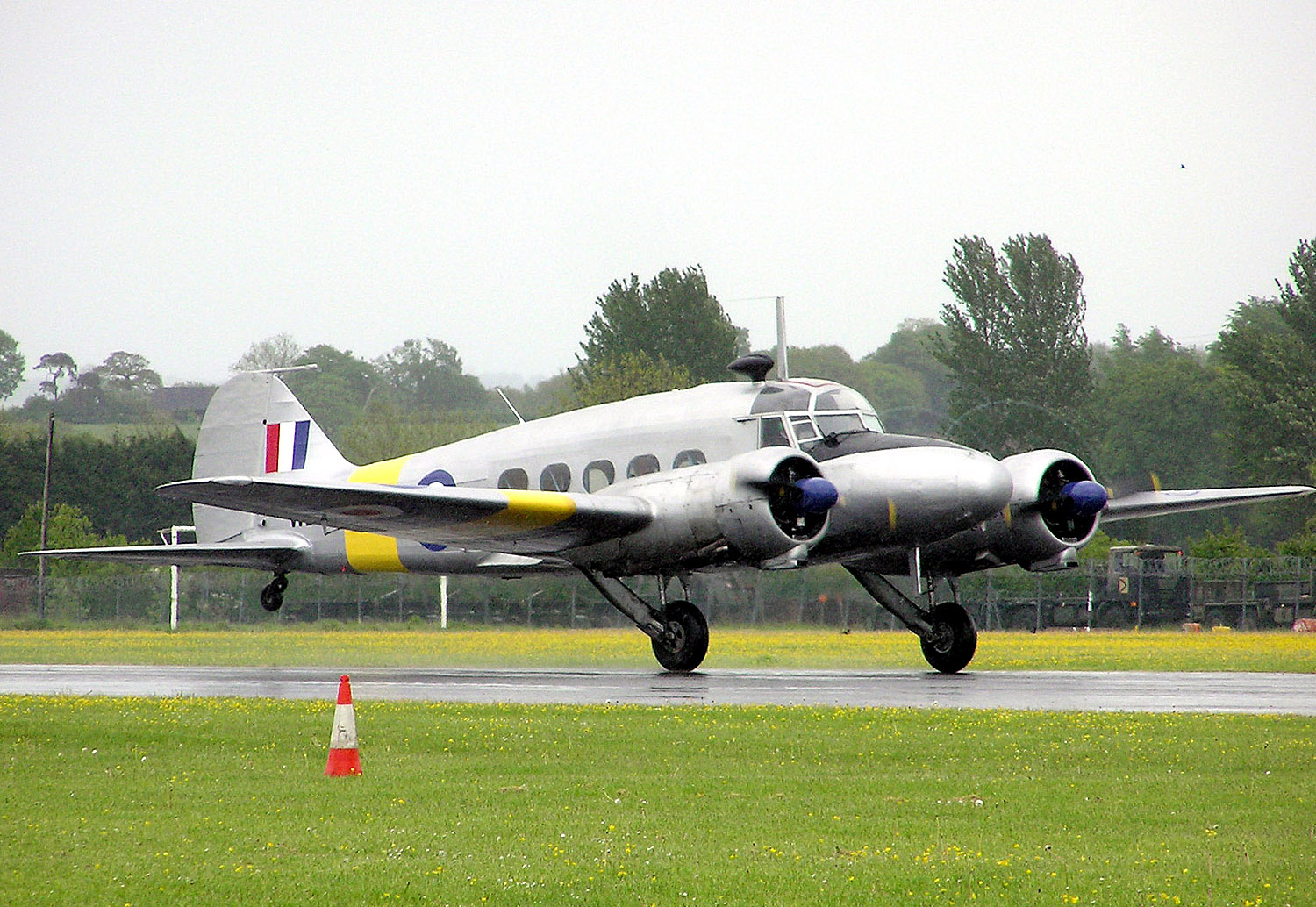
Avro Anson

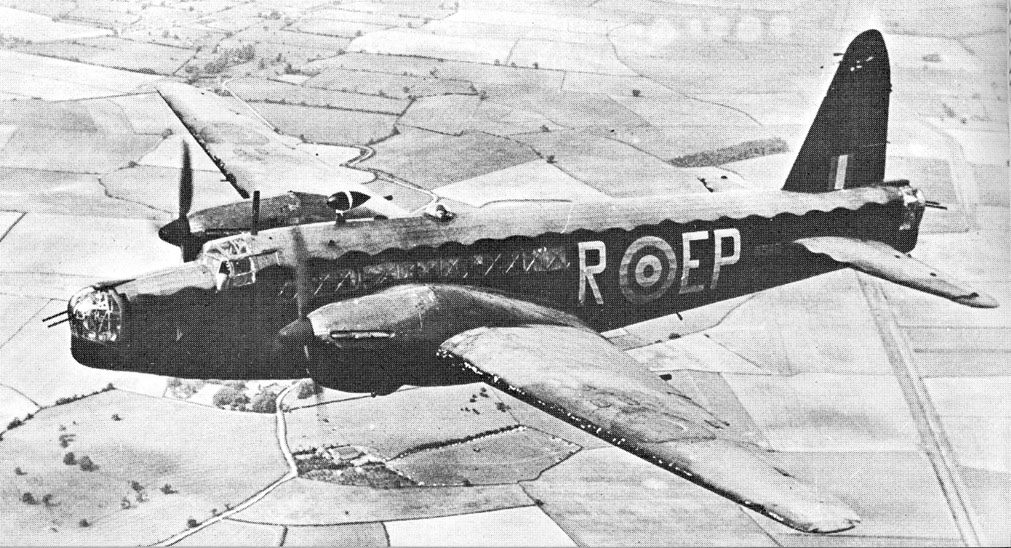
Vickers Wellington

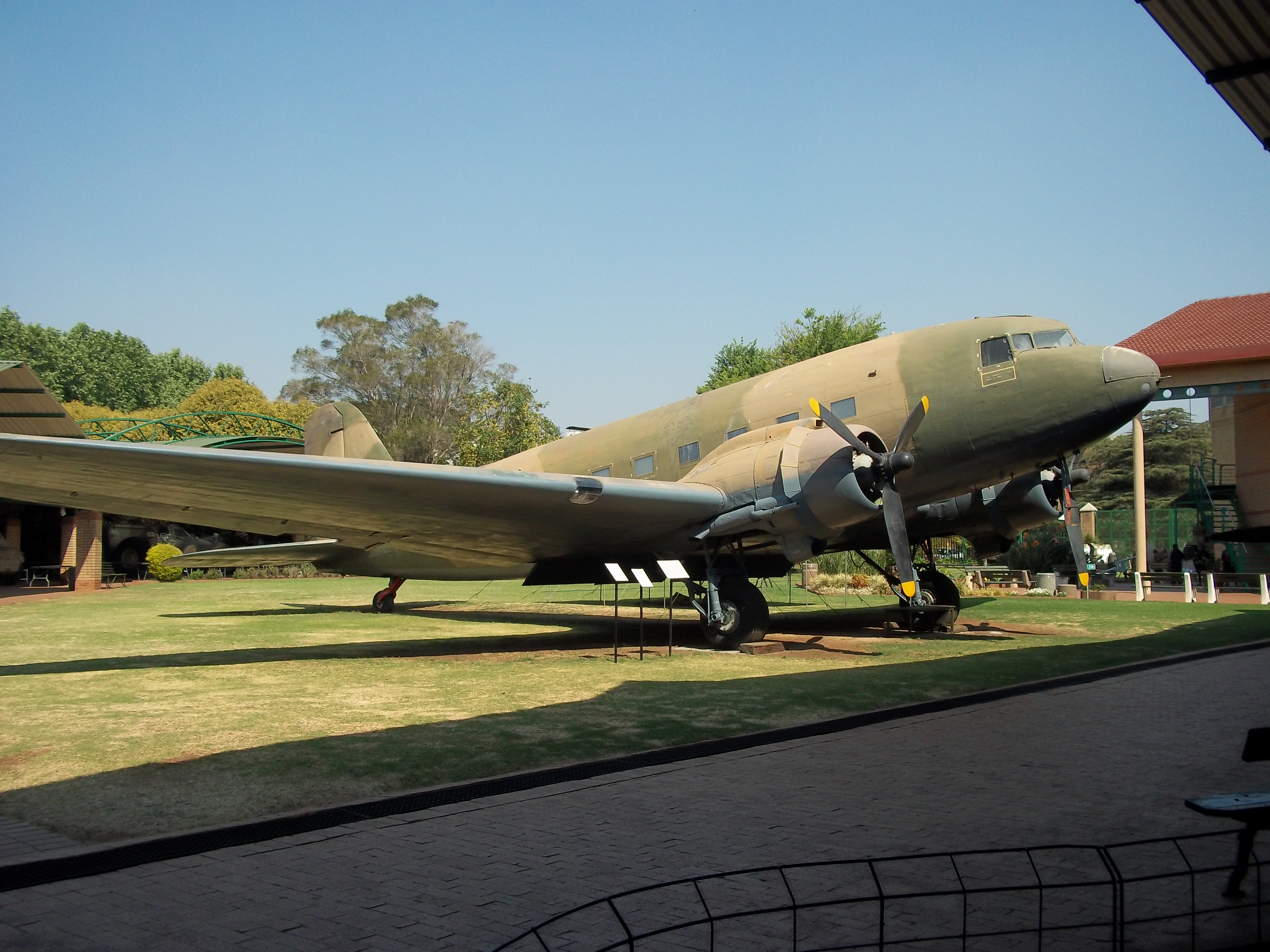
Douglas C-47 Dakota

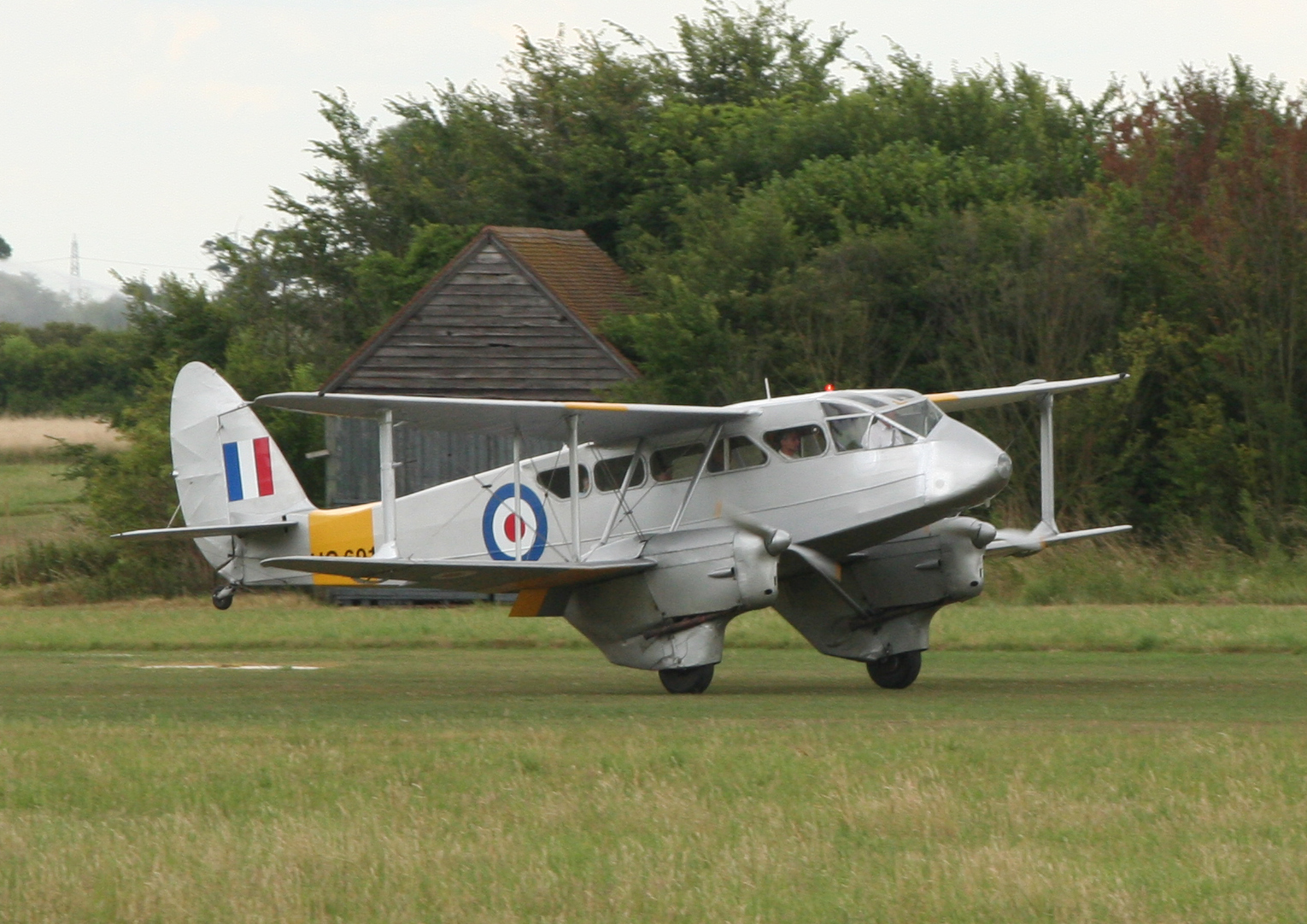
De Havilland DH-89 Dragon Rapide

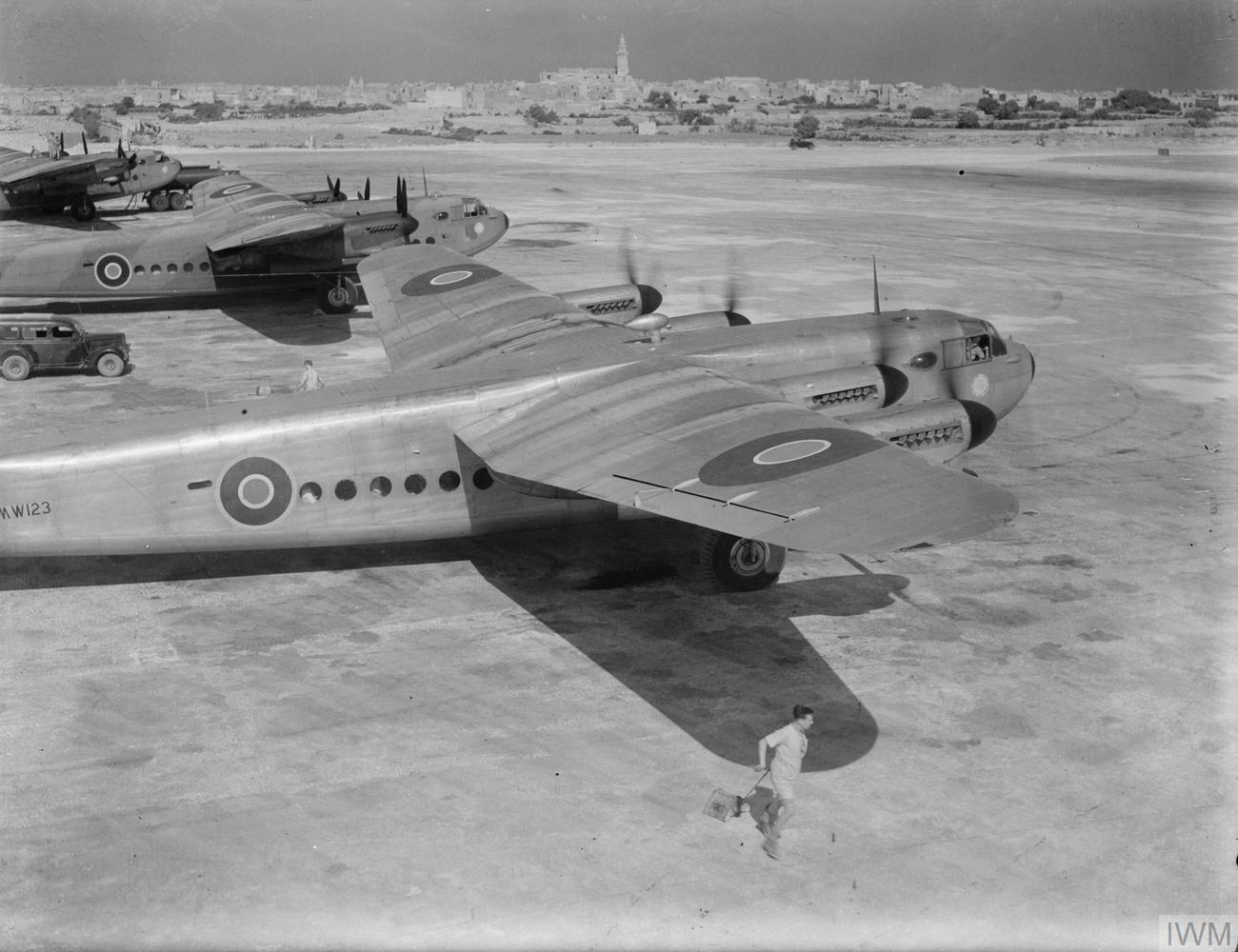
Avro York

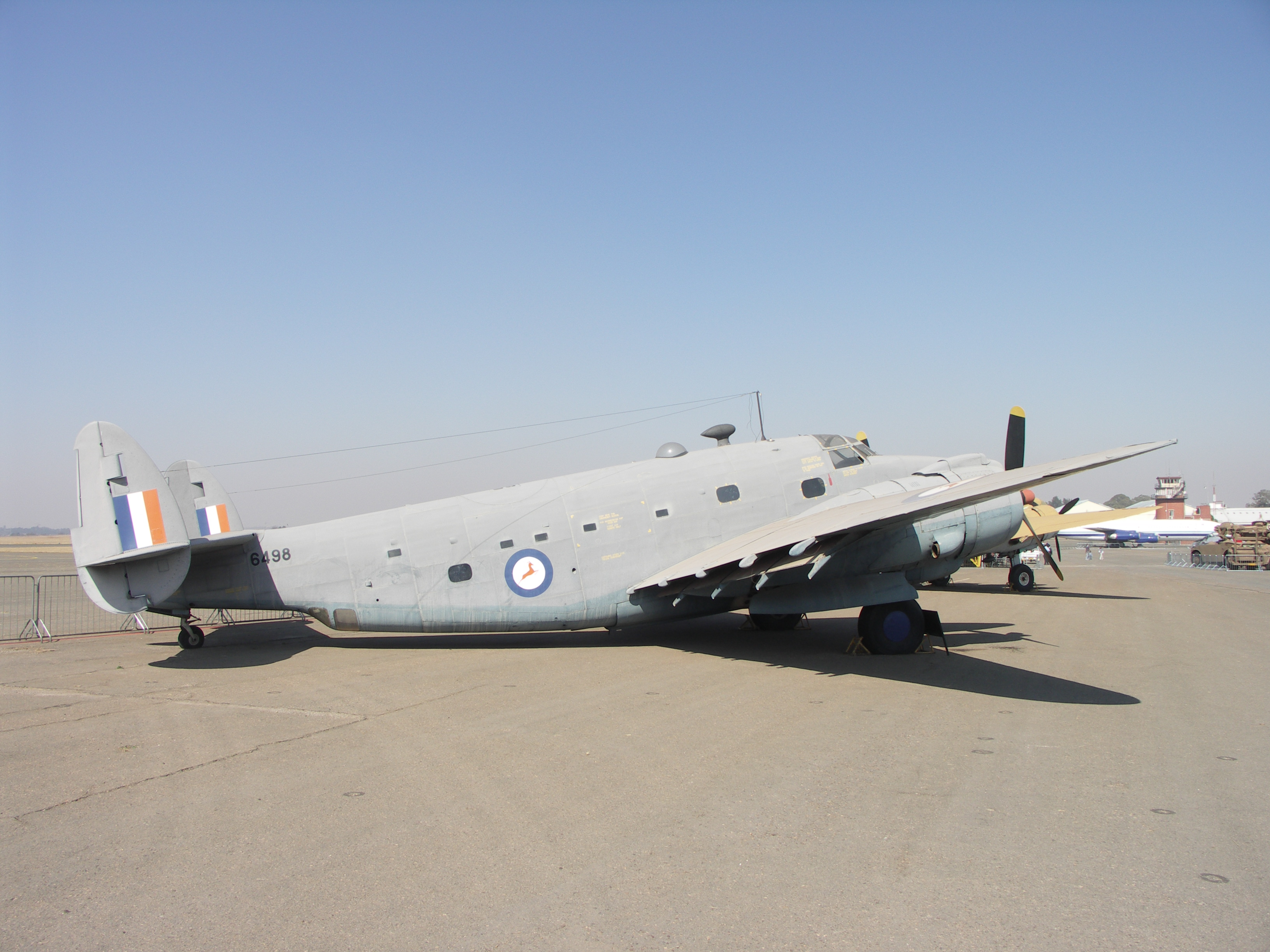
Lockheed Ventura

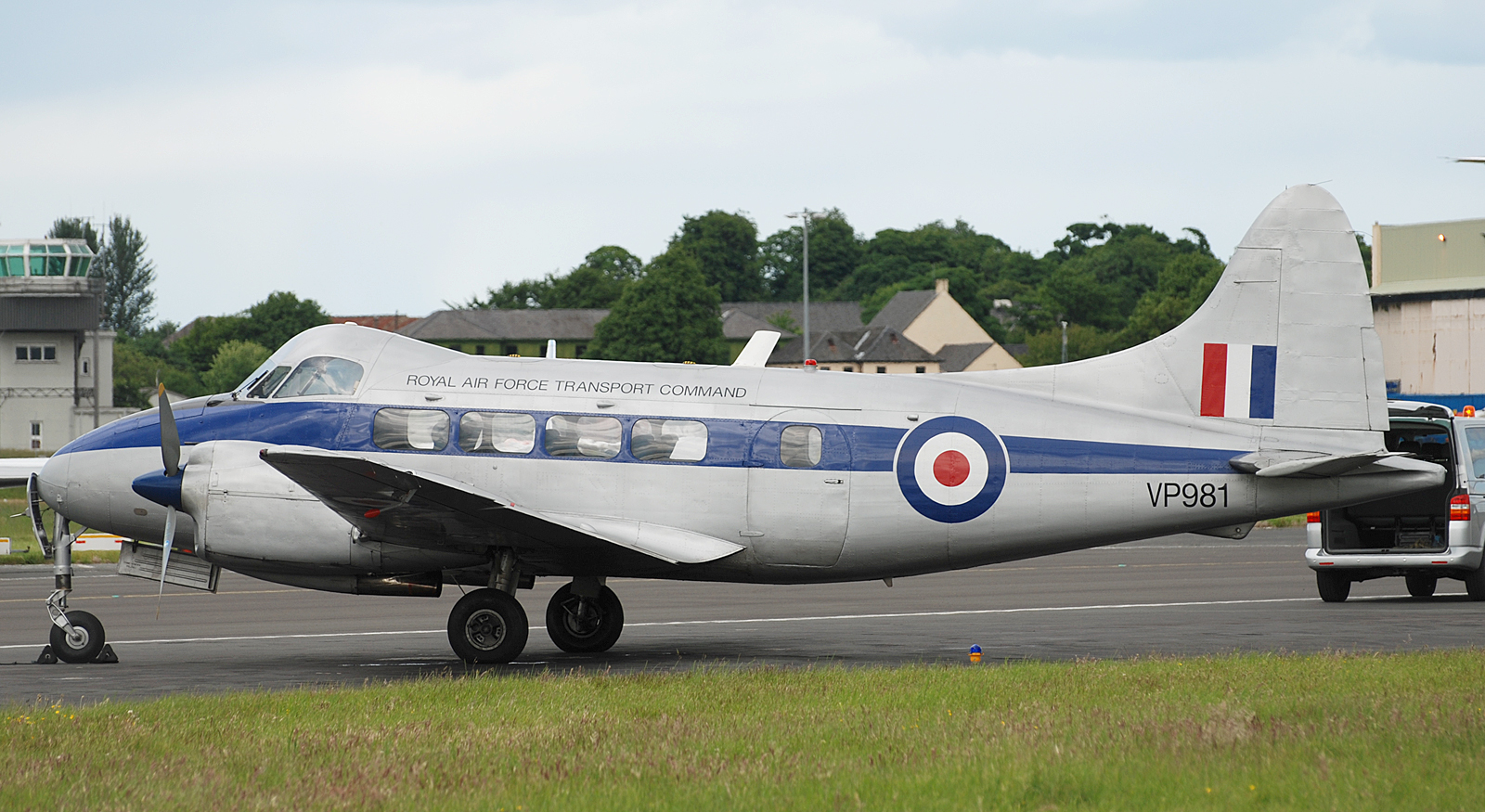
De Havilland Devon

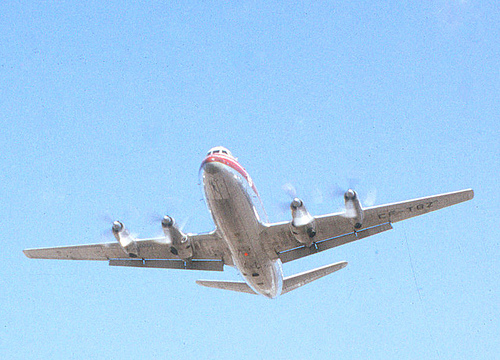
Vickers Viscount

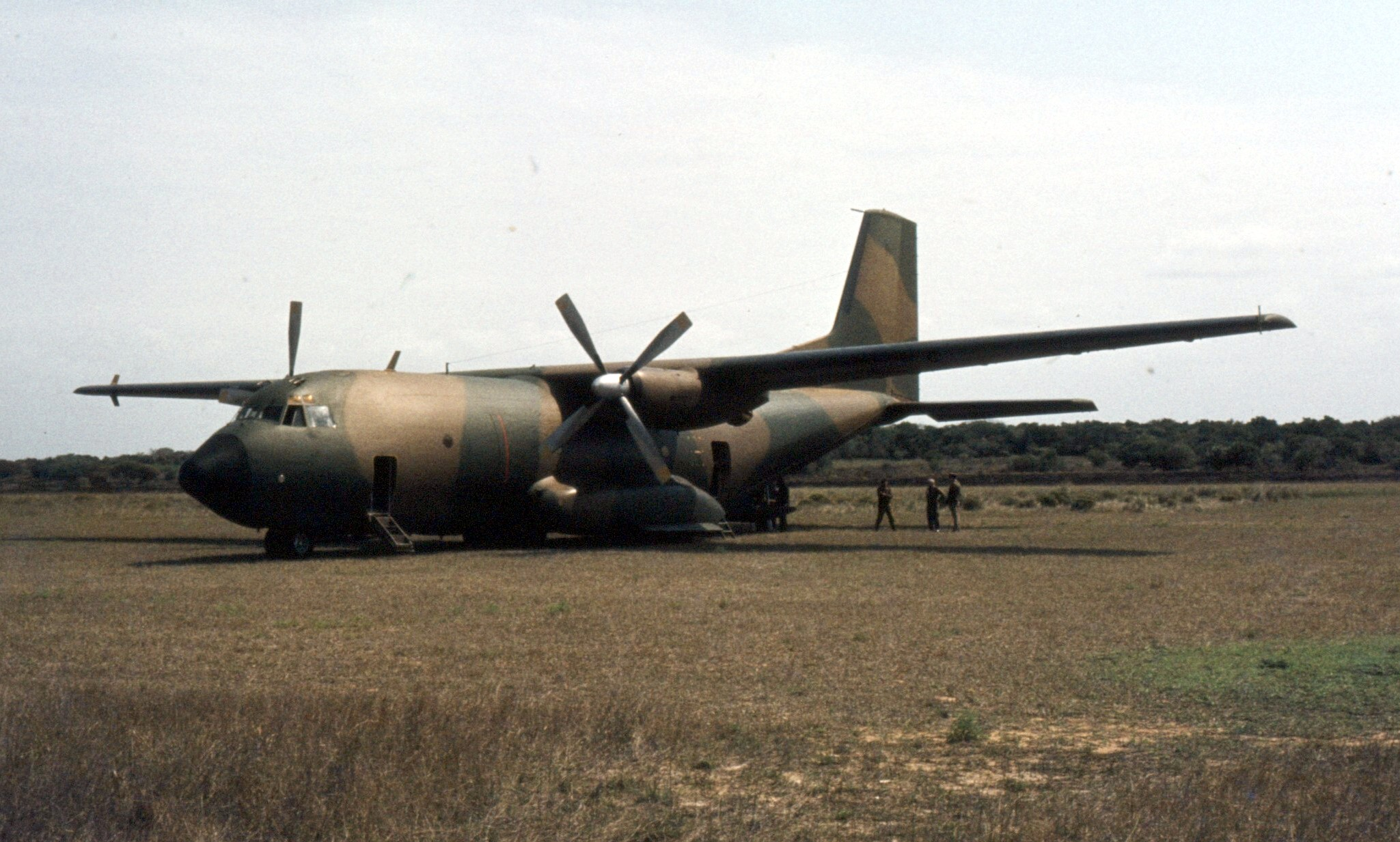
Transall C-160

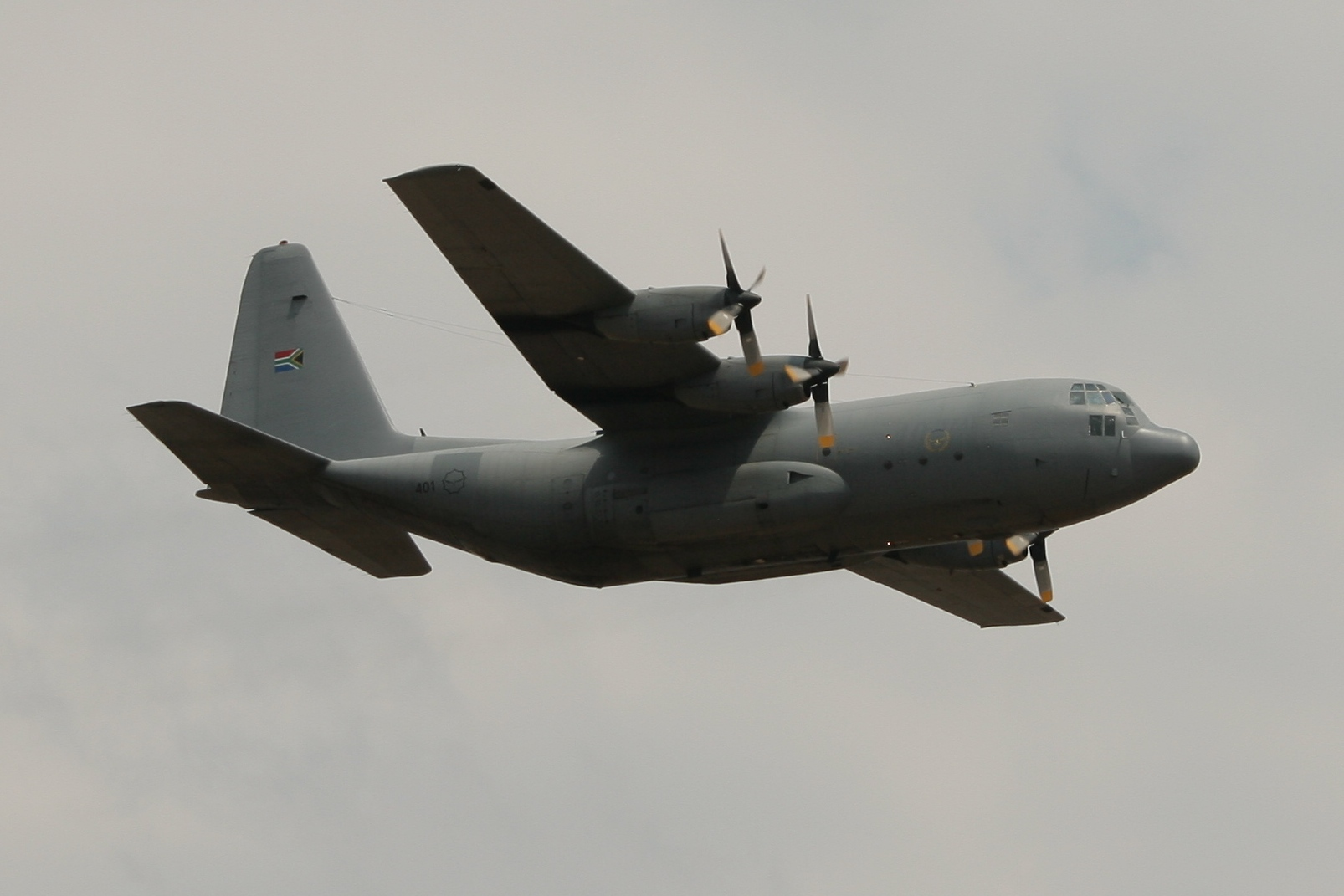
Lockheed C-130B Hercules built in 1963.
