= Harold Lydford =

Royal Air Force Air Marshal (1898–1979)

Sir Harold Lydford
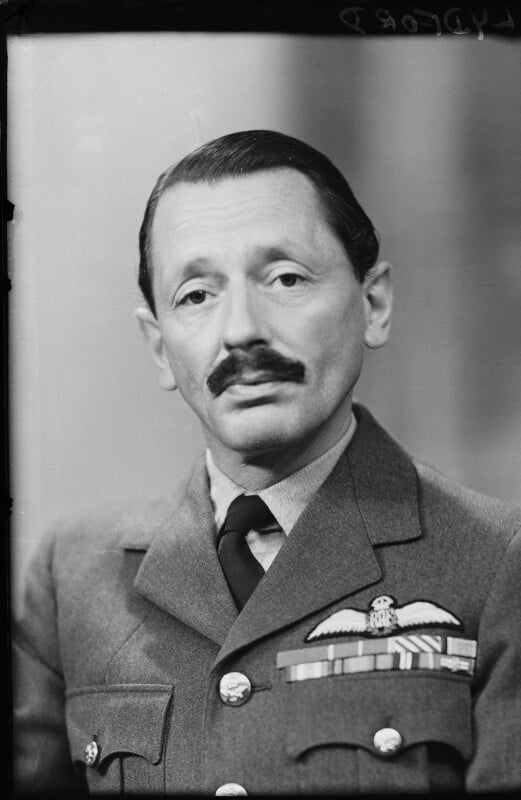
- Lydford in 1948
- Born: 7 May 1898; Brixton, London, England
- Died: 20 September 1979 (aged 81); Oxfordshire, England
- Military career
- Allegiance: United Kingdom
- Branch: British Army (1916–18); Royal Air Force (1918–56)
- Service years: 1916–56
- Rank: Air Marshal
- Commands: Home Command (1952–56); No. 18 Group (1950–52); RAF Regiment (1948–50); British Forces Aden (1945–48); No. 28 Group (1944–45)
- Conflicts: First World War; Second World War
- Awards: Knight Commander of the Order of the British Empire; Companion of the Order of the Bath; Air Force Cross; Commander of the Legion of Merit (United States)

Air Marshal Sir Harold Thomas Lydford, KBE, CB, AFC (7 May 1898 – 20 September 1979) was a First World War pilot in the Royal Flying Corps and senior commander in the Royal Air Force during the Second World War and the post-war decade.

== RAF career ==
Lydford was commissioned into the Special Reserve of the Royal Flying Corps in 1917. He transferred to the Royal Air Force after the war and served as a pilot with No. 208 Squadron in Constantinople. He served in the Second World War as Deputy Director of Organisation and Director of Organisation at the Air Ministry before being appointed Air Officer Commanding No. 28 Group in 1944 and Air Officer Commanding British Forces Aden in March 1945.

After the War he served as Commandant-General of the RAF Regiment, Air Officer Commanding No. 18 Group and Air Officer Commanding-in-Chief at Home Command before retiring in 1956. In retirement he became a Director of Electro Mechanisms Limited and Chairman of the Royal Air Forces Association.

Military offices
Preceded by John Quinnell	Air Officer Commanding No. 28 Group; 1944–1945	Succeeded by Andrew MacGregor
Preceded by Frank McNamara	Air Officer Commanding British Forces Aden; 1945–1948	Succeeded by Alick Stevens
Preceded by Alfred Robinson	Commandant-General of the RAF Regiment; 1948–1950	Succeeded by Stephen Strafford
Preceded by David Carnegie	Air Officer Commanding No. 18 Group; 1950–1952	Succeeded by Robert Ragg
Preceded by Sir Ronald Ivelaw-Chapman	Air Officer Commanding-in-Chief Home Command; 1952–1956	Succeeded by Sir Douglas Macfadyen
