= Harold Bird-Wilson =

Royal Air Force Air-Vice Marshal (1919-2000)

Harold Arthur Cooper Bird-Wilson
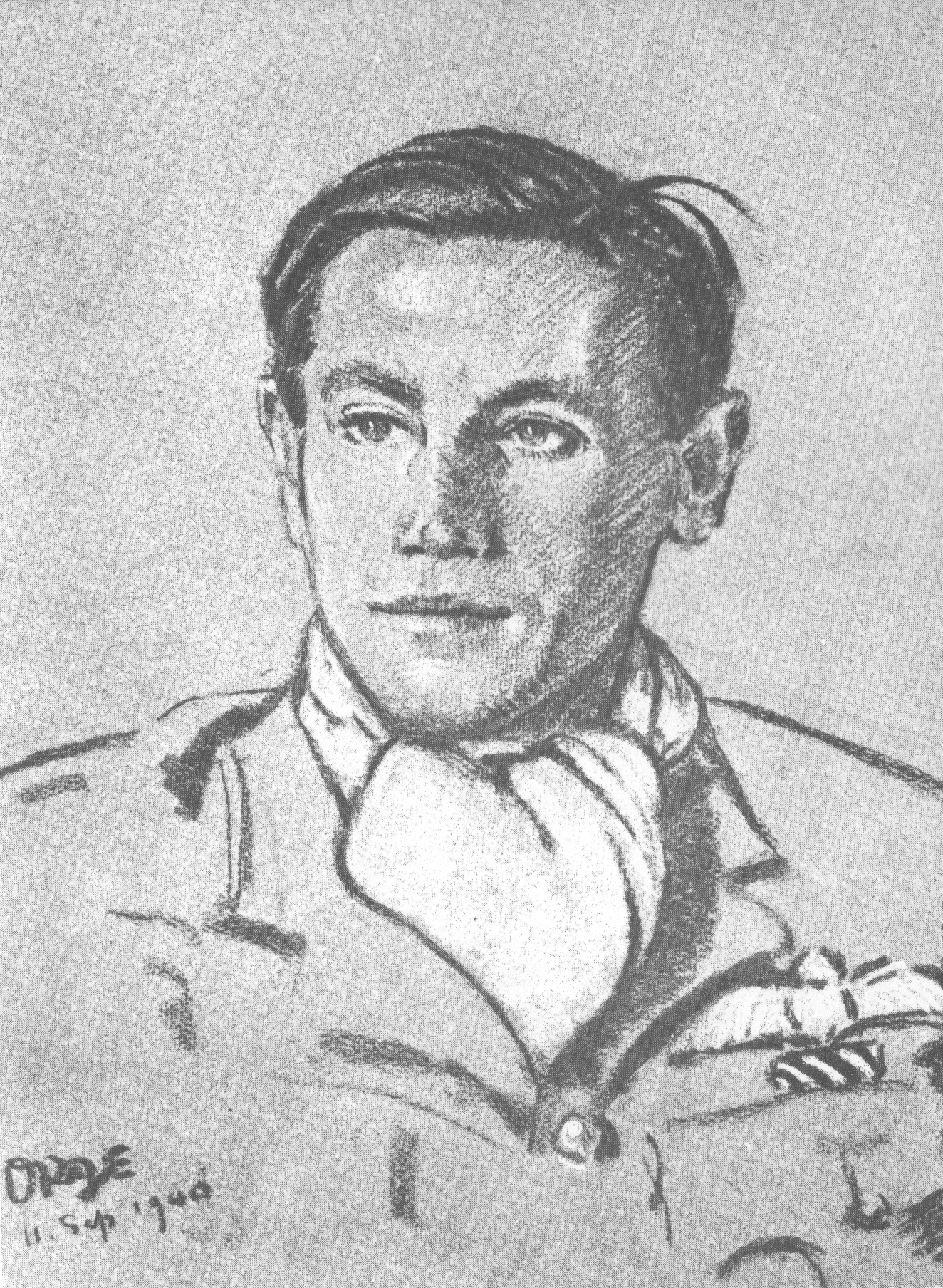
- Harold Bird-Wilson by Cuthbert Orde, 1940
- Born: 20 November 1919; Prestatyn, Wales
- Died: 27 December 2000 (aged 81)
- Military career
- Allegiance: United Kingdom
- Branch: Royal Air Force
- Service years: 1937–1974
- Rank: Air Vice Marshal
- Nickname: Birdie
- Commands: No. 23 Group (1970–73); RAF Hong Kong (1965–67); Central Flying School (1963–65); RAF Coltishall (1959–61); Air Fighting Development Squadron (1946–48); No. 66 Squadron RAF (1942–43); No. 152 Squadron RAF (1942)
- Conflicts: Second World War: Battle of Britain; Invasion of Normandy
- Awards: Commander of the Order of the British Empire; Distinguished Service Order; Distinguished Flying Cross & Bar; Air Force Cross & Bar; Airman's Cross (Netherlands); Medal of Merit (Czechoslovakia)

Air Vice Marshal Harold Arthur Cooper "Birdie" Bird-Wilson, CBE, DSO, DFC & Bar, AFC & Bar (20 November 1919 – 27 December 2000) was a senior Royal Air Force officer, and a flying ace of the Second World War.

== Early life ==
Bird-Wilson was born in Prestatyn, North Wales, on 20 November 1919. His father was a tea-planter in Bengal, and his parents remained in India, sending Bird-Wilson to boarding school. He later went to Liverpool College.

== Military career ==
On 30 November 1937, having had a few weeks initial officer training, he was granted a short-service commission in the RAF.

In August 1938 he was assigned to No. 17 Squadron, learning the rudiments of being a fighter pilot in Gloster Gauntlets. The Squadron was re-equipped with Hawker Hurricanes in June 1939.

Ten weeks later, he was flying a BA Swallow out of RAF Cranwell when he crashed in bad weather. His passenger was killed, and Bird-Wilson was left without a nose. He was treated by pioneering plastic surgeon Archibald McIndoe, who offered Bird-Wilson the nose of his choice, and went on to treat many disfigured RAF pilots during the war. Bird-Wilson subsequently became a member of the Guinea Pig Club, composed of McIndoe's former patients.

=== Second World War ===
In April 1940 Bird-Wilson was back on active service, in time to fly Hurricanes for the British retreat from France in the following weeks.

As an already accomplished pilot, he was one of the elite selected for one of Cuthbert Orde's iconic charcoal portraits, which was drawn on 11 September 1940.

On the morning of 24 September, flying Hurricane P3878 near Chatham, he became the 40th kill of Luftwaffe ace Adolf Galland of JG 26. Baling out on fire, he landed in the Thames and was picked up by a navy boat.

Yet again he was hospitalised. In 1941 he went back into service as an instructor at No. 56 Operational Training Unit (OTU) before seeing action flying Spitfires with No. 234 Squadron RAF, participating in raids over northern France. He returned for a spell commanding a unit at No. 56 OTU later in the year.

In 1942 he commanded No. 152 Squadron RAF and No. 66 Squadron RAF as they led fighter escorts for bombing raids to the northern European coast, moving on to lead Wings in 1943.

In 1944 he attended command training in the US at Fort Leavenworth, before returning to action over the Normandy Invasion. He ended the war commanding No. 1335 Jet Conversion Unit, the first jet unit in the RAF.

=== Post-war career ===
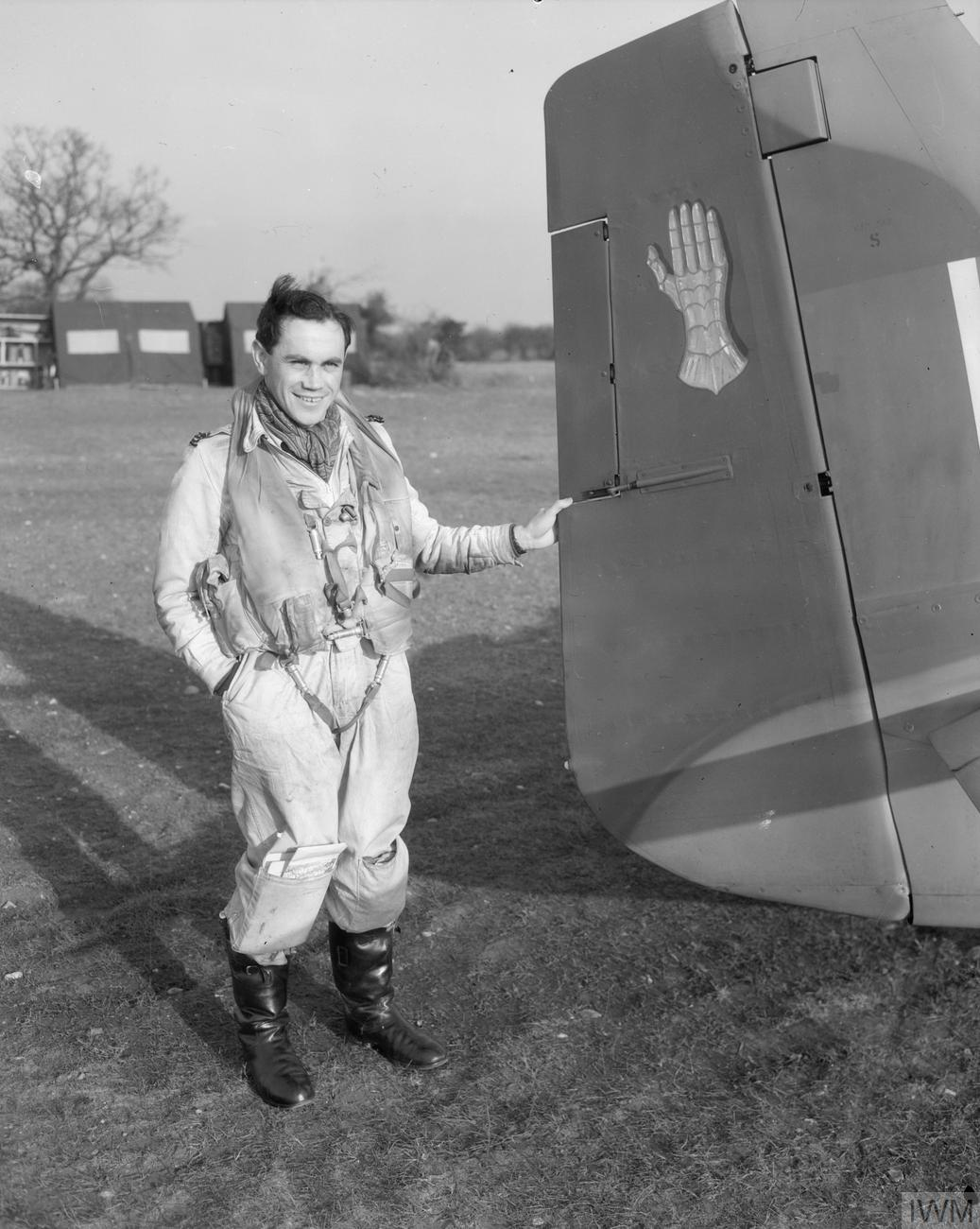
Bird-Wilson standing next to the tail of his North American Mustang Mark III, late 1944 or early 1945

For many years after the war Bird-Wilson held a variety of posts in the Central Flying Establishment. In 1946 he was given command of the air fighting development squadron. In 1948 he moved to Middle East operations, becoming personal staff officer to Air Chief Marshal Sir John Baker, Middle East Air Force Commander-in-Chief in 1949.

In 1954, he joined the British Joint Services Mission in Washington, D.C. He returned to be Station Commander at RAF Coltishall from June 1959 to November 1961, then held a post at the Air Ministry from 1961 to 1963; before two years commanding the Central Flying School; and a further two years as air officer commanding Hong Kong, 1965–1967. In 1967 he took up a post at the Ministry of Technology. From 1970 to March 1973, his penultimate posting was commanding No. 23 Group RAF in RAF Training Command, responsible for flying training. Finally, he commanded the Southern Maritime Air Region (No. 18 Group RAF, Strike Command) until 1 June 1974, when he retired at his own request. He died on 27 December 2000.

== Family ==
Bird-Wilson married Audrey Alma Wallace (b. 27 May 1923) in 1942. They had a son, Robert, in 1943 and a daughter, Carol, in 1945. Audrey died in 1991. He was remarried, to Margaret McGillivray Butler, in 1994.

== Notes ==
Military offices
Preceded by Harry Burton	Air Officer Commanding No. 23 Group; 1970–1973	Succeeded by John Gingell
