= George Harvey (RAF officer) =

Royal Air Force Air-Vice Marshal (1905-1969)

- Born: 18 August 1905
- Died: 24 February 1969 (aged 63)
- Military career
- Allegiance: United Kingdom
- Branch: Royal Air Force
- Service years: 1924–1958
- Rank: Air Vice Marshal
- Commands: RAF Hunsdon; No. 335 Wing; No. 286 Wing; No. 23 Group
- Conflicts: Second World War
- Awards: Knight Commander of the Order of the British Empire; Companion of the Order of the Bath; Distinguished Flying Cross

Air Vice Marshal Sir George David Harvey, KBE, CB, DFC (18 August 1905 – 24 February 1969) was a senior Royal Air Force officer.

== RAF career ==
Harvey was commissioned into the Royal Air Force on 15 September 1924. He served in the Second World War as officer commanding, RAF Hunsdon from 1941, officer commanding, No. 335 Wing in Sicily from September 1943 and as officer commanding, No. 286 Wing from January 1944. He went on to be Senior Air Staff Officer, Air Headquarters Eastern Mediterranean in March 1944 and Deputy Senior Air Staff Officer, at Headquarters Middle East Command in May 1944.

After the war he became Director of Personnel (Air) in December 1947, Senior Air Staff Officer, Headquarters RAF Bomber Command in September 1950 and Air Officer Commanding, No. 23 Group in October 1953. His last appointment was as Assistant Chief of the Air Staff (Training) in January 1956 before retiring in October 1958.

Military offices
Preceded by Francis Long	Air Officer Commanding No. 23 Group; 1953–1956	Succeeded by Henry Graham
