= Lawrence Pattinson =

Royal Air Force Air Marshal (1890-1955)

Sir Lawrence Pattinson
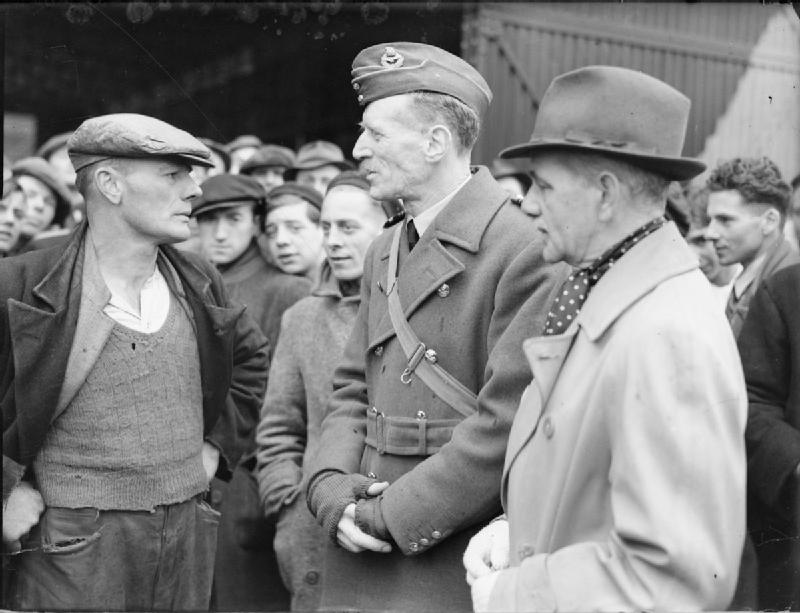
- Air Marshal L A Pattinson, Air Officer Commanding-in-Chief Flying Training Command, talking to workers at Rugby, Warwickshire, on the completion of an RAF training station in the Midlands
- Born: 8 October 1890
- Died: 28 March 1955 (aged 64)
- Military career
- Allegiance: United Kingdom
- Branch: Royal Air Force
- Service years: 1914–1945
- Rank: Air Marshal
- Commands: Flying Training Command (1940–1941); No. 23 (Training) Group (1937–1940); Armament Group (1934–1937); RAF Andover (1926); 41st Wing (1918); No. 99 Squadron (1918); No. 57 Squadron (1916–1917)
- Conflicts: First World War; Second World War
- Awards: Knight Commander of the Order of the British Empire; Companion of the Order of the Bath; Distinguished Service Order; Military Cross; Distinguished Flying Cross; Mentioned in Despatches; Order of the Cloud and Banner with Special Cravat (China); Order of the Sacred Tripod with Special Cravat (China)

Air Marshal Sir Lawrence Arthur Pattinson, KBE, CB, DSO, MC, DFC (8 October 1890 – 28 March 1955) was a Royal Air Force officer who became Air Officer Commanding-in-Chief of Flying Training Command from 1940 to 1941.

== RAF career ==
Educated at Rugby School and Cambridge University, Pattinson was commissioned into the 5th Battalion of the Durham Light Infantry in 1914 at the start of the First World War. He subsequently transferred to the Royal Fusiliers and then to the Royal Flying Corps and became Officer Commanding No. 57 Squadron on the Western Front in 1916. In March 1918 he became Officer Commanding No. 99 Squadron and later that year he took command of the 41st Wing.

Between the wars Pattinson was Station Commander at RAF Andover and then, from 1930, Deputy Director of Organisation at the Air Ministry. He went on to be Air Officer Commanding the Armament Group in 1934 and Air Officer Commanding No. 23 (Training) Group in 1937. He served in the Second World War as Air Officer Commanding Flying Training Command and then as Head of the RAF Training Mission to the Chinese Air Force before retiring in 1945. In recognition of his contribution to the development of the Chinese Air Force, in 1943 General Chiang Kai-shek gave him a black and gold lacquerware vase which is now in the Victoria and Albert Museum.

Military offices
New command	Air Officer Commanding-in-Chief Flying Training Command; 1940–1941	Succeeded by Sir William Welsh
