= No. 272 Squadron RAF =

- Active: 25 July 1918 – 5 March 1919; 18 November 1940 – 30 April 1945
- Country: United Kingdom
- Branch: Royal Air Force
- Mottos: On, on!

Insignia
- Squadron Badge: A person in armour wearing a helmet
- Squadron Codes: XK (Nov 1940 – May 1941)

No. 272 Squadron RAF was a Royal Air Force Squadron formed as an anti–submarine unit in World War I and a coastal fighter unit in World War II.

== History ==
=== Formation and World War I ===
No. 272 Squadron Royal Flying Corps was formed on 25 July 1918 and operated DH.6s from Machrihanish, Scotland on anti-submarine patrols and disbanded on 5 March 1919.

=== Reformation in World War II ===
The squadron reformed on 19 November 1940 at RAF Aldergrove. It received Blenheims and then converted to Beaufighters. Commanded from 1941 to 1942 by Wing Commander Robert Yaxley, it operated in the Western Desert, attacking enemy aerodromes, transport aircraft and lines of communication. There were a number of Belgian aircrew in the squadron.

It was then based in Crete to provide protection for convoys and at Luqa, Malta and Sicily following Operation Husky. On 8 September 1944, the Italian liner SS Rex was attacked by twelve No. 272 Squadron Beaufighters at Capodistria Bay, south of Trieste, leaving her on fire and badly listing. As the Allied forces advanced into Italy, the squadron moved to Alghero and Foggia, and it disbanded at Gragnano on 30 April 1945.

== Aircraft operated ==
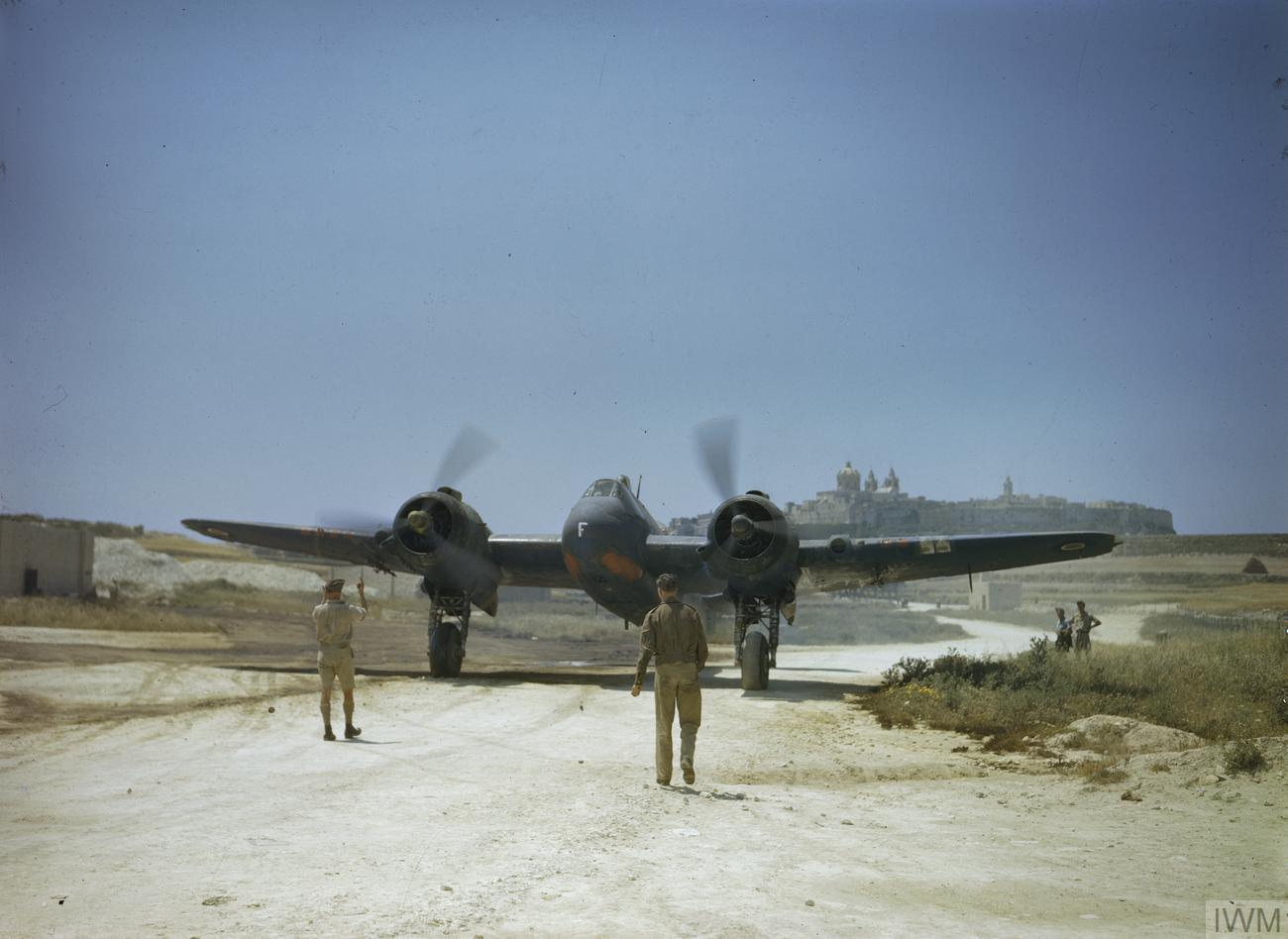
A 272 Sqn Bristol Beaufighter at Ta'Qali, Malta, 27 June 1943.

Aircraft operated by no. 272 Squadron RAF
From	To	Aircraft	Variant
Jul 1918	Mar 1919	Airco DH.6	
Nov 1918	Mar 1919	Fairey III	A
Nov 1940	Apr 1941	Bristol Blenheim	IVF
Apr 1941	Jul 1943	Bristol Beaufighter	IC
Nov 1942	Feb 1944	Bristol Beaufighter	VIC
Sep 1943	May 1944	Bristol Beaufighter	XI
Dec 1943	Apr 1945	Bristol Beaufighter	X
