= RAF Air Support Command =

Former command of the Royal Air Force

Royal Air Force Air Support Command
- Command badge
- Founded: 1 August 1967 – 1 September 1972
- Country: United Kingdom
- Branch: Royal Air Force
- Type: Command
- Role: support aircraft
- Headquarters: RAF Upavon
- Mottos: Ferio Ferendo; Latin: "I Strike by Carrying"

Insignia
- crest heraldry: A golden griffon in front of a globe

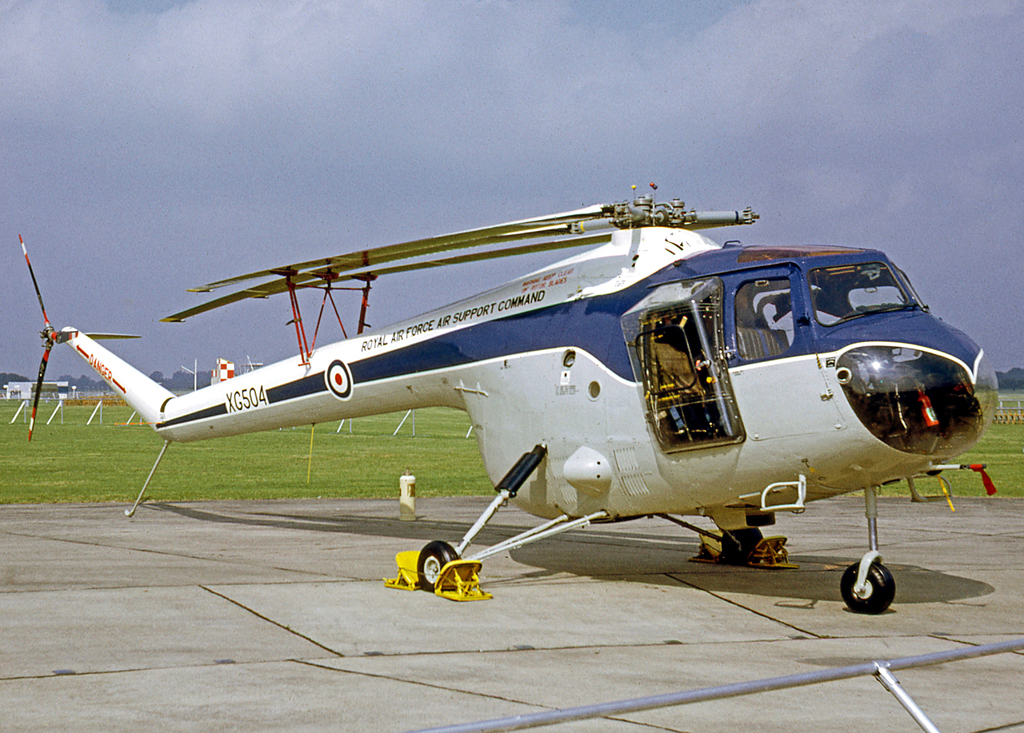
RAF Air Support Command Bristol Sycamore communications helicopter in 1968

Air Support Command of the Royal Air Force was formed on 1 August 1967 by the redesignation of Transport Command. Its change of name reflected the change of emphasis of the Command from solely transporting materials and manpower around the world to providing general support to RAF operations around the world.

The result of this broader role meant that Air Support Command, unlike its predecessor Transport Command, possessed strike aircraft such as Hawker Hunters. With the contraction of the RAF, it only lasted a short time as a command, and it was absorbed into Strike Command on 1 September 1972 forming No. 38 Group and No. 46 Group within Strike Command. The former was designated as a tactical support and the latter as a strategic support group.

Order of Battle: April 1972 - HQ at Upavon

- RAF Andover
  - No. 21 Squadron RAF - Devon, Pembroke
- RAF Benson
  - Queen's Flight - Andover, Chipmunk, Heron & Whirlwind
- RAF Brize Norton
  - No. 10 Squadron RAF - VC10
  - No. 53 Squadron RAF - Belfast
  - No. 99 Squadron RAF - Britannia
  - No. 511 Squadron RAF - Britannia
  - No. 241 Operational Conversion Unit RAF - Belfast, Britannia & VC10
- RAF Coningsby
  - No. 228 Operational Conversion Unit RAF - Phantom
- RAF Lyneham
  - No. 216 Squadron RAF - Comet
- RAF Northolt
  - No. 32 Squadron RAF - Andover, Dominie, Basset & Whirlwind
- RAF Odiham
  - No. 240 Operational Conversion Unit RAF - Puma & Wessex
- RAF Thorney Island
  - No. 242 Operational Conversion Unit RAF - Andover & Hercules
- RAF Wittering
  - No. 233 Operational Conversion Unit RAF - Harrier

== Commanders in Chief ==
Commanders-in-Chief included:

- 1 August 1967 - Air Marshal Sir Thomas Prickett
- 1 July 1968 - Air Marshal Sir Lewis Hodges
- 1 October 1970 - Air Marshal Sir Harry Burton

== See also ==
- List of Royal Air Force commands

Preceded by Transport Command	Air Support Command; 1967–1972	Succeeded by Strike Command
