= No. 23 Group RAF =

Former Royal Air Force flying training group

No. 23 (Training) Group RAF ~~No. 23 (Equipment) Group RAF~~
- Royal Air Force Ensign
- Active: 1 April 1918 - 10 May 1918; 12 April 1926 – 2 May 1975
- Country: United Kingdom
- Branch: Royal Air Force
- Type: Royal Air Force group
- Role: Military aviation training
- Part of: RAF Training Command (May 1936 - May 1940, June 1968 - May 1975); RAF Flying Training Command (May 1940 - June 1968)
- Headquarters: Glasgow; Spitalgate; South Cerney; Leighton Buzzard; Church Fenton; Dishforth; Linton-on-Ouse

Commanders
- Notable commanders: Air Chief Marshal Sir Keith Rodney Park GCB, KBE, MC & Bar, DFC

No. 23 Group RAF (23 Gp) was a group of the Royal Air Force, first established in 1918. It disbanded the same year but reformed during 1926 and finally disbanded for the second time in 1975.

== History ==
=== First World War ===
On the 1 April 1918, at the Adelphi Hotel, located on the corner of Union Street and Argyle Street, in the Scottish city of Glasgow, No. 23 (Equipment) Group was formed. The group was initially within No. 5 Area, but this changed on 8 May to become North-Western Area. However, two days later, on 10 May 1918, the group disbanded.

=== Interwar period ===
The group was reformed as No. 23 (Training) Group in RAF Inland Area on 12 April 1926, at RAF Spitalgate, by re-numbering No. 3 Group RAF. Its stations were RAF Digby, RAF Eastchurch, RAF Flowerdown, RAF Manston, and RAF Sealand, while it commanded Nos. 1 (Netheravon), 2, and 5 FTSs; the Armament and Gunnery School RAF at RAF Eastchurch; the School of Technical Training (Airmen) at RAF Manston; the Central Flying School at RAF Upavon, and finally the Electrical and Wireless School at RAF Flowerdown.

The Group was transferred to RAF Training Command on 1 May 1936. The RAF List for 1938 records that it comprised the Central Flying School RAF; Nos. 1-3 and Nos. 5-11 Flying Training Schools; the Packing Depot at RAF Sealand; the School of Air Navigation and No. 48 Squadron RAF at RAF Manston; the Station Flight and No. 24 MU at RAF Ternhill; and No. 27 MU at RAF Shawbury.

=== Second World War ===
In September 1939 it controlled Nos 1, 2, 3, 5, 6, 7, 9, 10, 11, and 12 Service Flying Training Schools, the Aeroplane and Armament Experimental Establishment at RAF Martlesham Heath, in Suffolk and the group communications flight, co-located with group headquarters, at RAF Spitalgate, in Lincolnshire.

It was then transferred again, this time to RAF Flying Training Command on 27 May 1940. In December 1940, after his successful leadership of No. 11 Group RAF during the Battle of Britain, Air Vice-Marshal Keith Park was transferred into RAF Training Command. He became air officer commanding of No. 23 Group on 27 December 1940.

=== Cold War ===
After 1 January 1957, No. 23 Group was responsible for Nos 1 - 5, No. 6 Flying Training School RAF (1957-68), No. 7 (from 1957-60) and No. 8 Flying Training School RAF (from 1957-64). The Group Headquarters moved to RAF Church Fenton in Yorkshire during 1959, and then to RAF Dishforth in Yorkshire during 1962. It was reabsorbed into RAF Training Command in 1968; it disbanded at RAF Linton-on-Ouse, Yorkshire, on 2 May 1975.

RAF Training Command itself disbanded in 1977, and by 1982 flying training units were being directed by Air Officer Training and AOC Training Units at Headquarters RAF Support Command.

== Headquarters ==
No. 23 Group had various Headquarters across its two active periods:

- Adelphi Hotel, Argyle Street, Glasgow - during 1918
- RAF Spitalgate - from April to August 1926
- St Vincents Hall, Grantham - from August 1926
- RAF Spitalgate - from October 1937
- RAF South Cerney - from October 1939
- Oxenden House, Plantation Road, Leighton Buzzard - from September 1946
- RAF Church Fenton - from September 1959
- RAF Dishforth - from March 1962
- RAF Linton-on-Ouse - July 1966

== Interbellum and World War II Air Officers Commanding ==
Air Officer Commanding, No. 23 Group Royal Air Force, from reformation to the end of World War II.

- 12 April 1926 - Air Commodore Ian Bonham-Carter
- 15 December 1927 - Air Commodore B C H Drew
- 15 December 1929 - Air Commodore Philip Joubert de la Ferté
- 6 September 1930 - Air Commodore P F M Fellowes
- 31 October 1932 - Air Commodore Patrick Playfair
- 9 September 1933 - Air Commodore Hazelton Nicholl
- 16 April 1934 - Air Commodore Charles Breese
- 27 February 1937 - Air Vice-Marshal Lawrence Pattinson
- 27 December 1940 - Air Vice-Marshal Keith Park
- 28 January 1942 - Air Vice-Marshal Douglas Harries
- 2 August 1943 - Air Vice-Marshal M Thomas
- 8 March 1944 - Air Vice-Marshal C E W Lockyer

== Postwar Air Officers Commanding ==
- 1945 (precise date unknown) - Air Vice-Marshal Frank Inglis
- 3 February 1947 - Air Vice Marshal Arthur Ledger
- 20 February 1950 - Air Vice Marshal Lawrence ('Johnny') Darvall MC
- September 1951 - Air Vice Marshal Allan Hesketh CB, CBE, DFC
- 9 April 1952 - Air Vice Marshal Francis Long CB
- 12 October 1953 - Air Vice Marshal George Harvey
- 19 December 1955 - Air Vice Marshal Henry Graham DSO DFC
- 1 December 1958 - Air Vice Marshal Colin Scragg CBE, AFC & bar
- 15 December 1960 - Air Vice Marshal William Coles DSO, DFC & bar, AFC
- 29 August 1963 - Air Vice Marshal Peter Philpott CBE
- 23 August 1965 - Air Vice Marshal Michael Lyne, AFC & two bars
- 15 December 1967 - Air Vice Marshal Harry Burton CBE, DSO
- 6 February 1970 - Air Vice Marshal Harold Bird-Wilson, CBE, DSO, DFC & bar, AFC & bar
- 3 March 1973 - Air Vice Marshal John Gingell CBE (listed in post as AOC 23 Group until 6 June 1975)
