= No. 216 Group RAF =

Former Royal Air Force operations group

No. 216 (Air Transport and Ferry) Group ~~No. 216 (Ferry) Group~~
- Active: 21 May 1942 - 26 October 1946
- Country: United Kingdom
- Branch: Royal Air Force
- Type: Royal Air Force group
- Part of: RAF Middle East Command; RAF Transport Command
- Engagements: World War II

Commanders
- Notable commanders: Air Commodore Whitney Straight

No. 216 (Ferry) Group was a command of the Royal Air Force (RAF) during World War II established on 21 May 1942. The group was renamed No. 216 (Air Transport and Ferry) Group on 9 September 1942 and placed under the command of Air Commodore Whitney Straight the following day.

No. 216 Group became a major sub-command of the Mediterranean Air Command that was created at the Casablanca Conference in January 1943. On 25 March 1943, No. 216 Group also became a sub-command of the newly created Transport Command, an umbrella organization of all British transport units worldwide under the command of Air Chief Marshal Sir Frederick Bowhill. The group was sometimes aided by British Overseas Airways Corporation in the receiving, preparing, and dispatching of aircraft reinforcements into the North African and Mediterranean Theater of Operations. The components of No. 216 Group at the time of the Allied invasion of Sicily (Operation Husky) on 10 July 1943 are indicated below.

== No. 216 (Air Transport and Ferry) Group ==
Order of Battle, 10 July 1943, Air Commodore Whitney Straight
Units	Aircraft	Notes
17 Squadron	Junkers 52	
28 Squadron	Anson	
117 Squadron	Hudson	RAF Castel Benito, Libya
173 Squadron	Lodestar, Proctor, Hurricane	
216 Squadron	C-47 Dakota	
230 Squadron	Sunderland	
267 Squadron	Hudson	
23 ADRU	Various	Aircraft Despatch and Reception Unit, Catania, Sicily

On 7 May 1944, No 115 (Transport) Wing RAF was established at Wadi Seidna in the Sudan by redesignating No 2 (Middle East) Ferry Control within 216 Group.

No. 216 (Air Transport and Ferry) Group was disbanded on 26 October 1946.
