= No. 28 Group RAF =

Former Royal Air Force operations group

No. 28 (Technical Training) Group RAF ~~No. 28 (Orkney & Shetland Islands) Group RAF~~
- Royal Air Force Ensign
- Active: 13 July 1918 – 15 April 1919; 1 November 1942 – 6 March 1950
- Country: United Kingdom
- Branch: Royal Air Force
- Type: Royal Air Force group
- Part of: RAF Technical Training Command
- Motto(s): Latin: Ad Suam Quisqueo Peram ("To each his own prepares")

Commanders
- Notable commanders: Air Marshal Sir Harold Thomas Lydford KBE, CB, AFC

No. 28 Group RAF (28 Gp) is a former Royal Air Force group which disbanded in March 1950. It initially formed in July 1918, then disbanded in April 1919. The group reformed in November 1942 as No. 28 (Technical Training) Group within RAF Technical Training Command.

== History ==
First World War

On 13 July 1918, at Stenness under the Commander-in-chief of the Grand Fleet, No 28 (Orkney & Shetland Islands) Group was formed. It was active for almost one year before disbanding on 15 April 1919. All of it units moved into No. 29 Group.

Second World War

On 1 November 1942 it reformed within RAF Technical Training Command, at 17/19 Queen Square, London, as No. 28 (Technical Training) Group. It assumed control of units from both Nos. 20 and 24 Group, from 1 January 1943.

Cold War

The group headquarters moved to Uxbridge after the Second World War, but five years after the end it disbanded on 6 March 1950.

== Structure ==
April 1943

No. 28 Group was responsible medical and administrative institutions.

July 1944

No. 28 Group controlled various schools, instituations and hospitals.

July 1945

No. 28 Group mainly medical and administrative installations.

== Air Officers Commanding ==
Note: The ranks shown are the ranks held at the time of holding the appointment of commanding officer, No. 28 Group Royal Air Force.

No. 28 Group commanding officers
Rank	name	from
Colonel	E R C Nanson	August 1918
Disbanded		April 1919
Air Commodore	John Charles (Paddy) Quinnell	November 1942
Air Vice-Marshall	Harold Lydford	1944
Air Vice-Marshall	Hector McGregor	February 1945
Air Vice-Marshall	Arthur Ledger	1946–47
Air Vice-Marshall	Cecil Alfred Stevens	1947–48/49
Air Vice-Marshall	Francis Ronald Swain	February 1949
