= No. 117 Squadron RAF =

Defunct flying squadron of the Royal Air Force

- Active: 1 Jan 1918 – 6 Oct 1919; 30 Apr 1941 – 17 Dec 1945
- Country: United Kingdom
- Branch: Royal Air Force
- Motto: "It shall be done"

Insignia
- Squadron Heraldry: A terrestrial globe with British colonies gules
- Squadron Codes: EX (Apr 1937 – Sep 1939); LD (Jul 1943 – Sep 1943)

No. 117 Squadron RAF was a Royal Air Force Squadron formed to be a bomber unit in World War I and reformed as a transport and communications unit in World War II.

== History ==
=== Formation and World War I ===
No. 117 Squadron was formed as a bomber squadron in the Royal Flying Corps on 31 January 1918 and was based at Wyton where it was equipped with the Airco DH.9. The squadron became part of the Royal Air Force and was stationed in Ireland for a time before it was merged with No. 141 Squadron on 6 October 1919.

=== Reformation in World War II ===
No. 117 Squadron was reformed on 30 April 1941 at Khartoum, Sudan and incorporated the Khartoum Communications Flight which already had a captured Italian Caproni Ca.148 aircraft that had been impressed into service in 1940. Needing a long range aircraft, four Bristol Bombays were borrowed from No. 216 Squadron and in May a flight of ex-Yugoslav Savoia-Marchetti S.79Ks were taken on charge. When the squadron moved to Egypt in November 1941 to provide transport services, the communications aircraft were left in Khartoum and the Bombays were returned. The whole squadron was reequipped with the Lockheed Hudson. In July–August 1943 it was involved in Operation Husky as part of No. 216 Group and switched to Douglas Dakotas DC-3s based at Castel Benito, Libya. In October the squadron moved to India and in 1944 it transported supplies for the Chindits who operated behind the Japanese lines. The squadron was disbanded on 17 December 1945 shortly after the war with Japan ended.

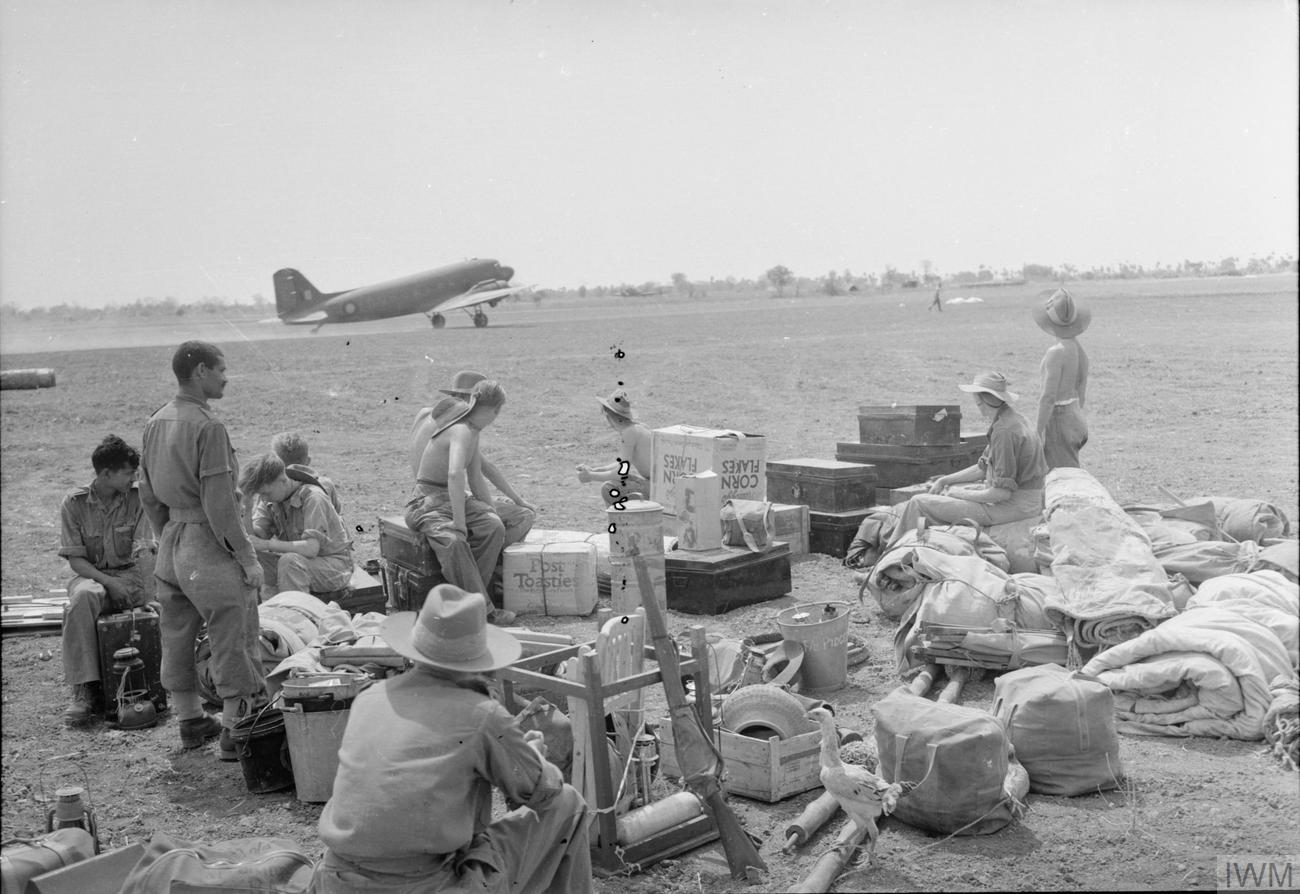
A Douglas Dakota of No. 117 Squadron takes off from an airfield in Burma

== Aircraft operated ==
Data from unless otherwise specified

Aircraft operated by no. 117 Squadron RAF
From	To	Aircraft	Variant
Oct 1918	Oct 1919	Airco DH.9	
Apr 1941	Nov 1941	Caproni Ca.148	
Apr 1941	Nov 1941	Percival Proctor	I
Apr 1941	Nov 1941	Vickers Wellesley	I
Apr 1941	Nov 1941	Gloster Gladiator	I
Apr 1941	Nov 1941	Bristol Bombay	I
May 1941	Nov 1941	Savoia-Marchetti S.79	K
Nov 1941	May 1943	Lockheed Hudson	
Oct 1941	Apr 1942	Douglas DC-2	K
Mar 1942	May 1942	D.H. 86	B
May 1942	Sep 1942	Douglas DC-3	
May 1942	Sep 1942	Lockheed Model 18 Lodestar	II
Jul 1942	Sep 1943	Lockheed Hudson	VI
Jun 1943	Dec 1945	Douglas Dakota	III
Jan 1945	Dec 1945	Douglas Dakota	IV
Jan 1945	Dec 1945	Stinson L-5 Sentinel	I
