= RAF Flying Training Command =

Former command of the Royal Air Force

Flying Training Command

- RAF Flying Training Command badge
- Active: 27 May 1940 - 1 June 1968
- Country: United Kingdom
- Branch: Royal Air Force
- Type: Command
- Role: Flying training
- Headquarters: RAF Shinfield Park, Reading
- Motto(s): Per Laborem ad Summa; Latin: Through toil to Supremacy
- Engagements: Second World War; Cold War

Flying Training Command was an organization of the Royal Air Force; it controlled flight training units. The command's headquarters were at RAF Shinfield Park, Reading in Berkshire.

== History ==
Flying Training Command was formed from the elements of Training Command which were responsible for flying training on 27 May 1940; Reserve Command, formed 1 February 1939, was absorbed into Flying Training Command on the same date. The remainder of Training Command became Technical Training Command on the same date. No. 21 Group RAF was transferred to Flying Training Command on 27 May 1940, responsible for the RAF College and the Service Flight Training Schools from the Midlands northwards. Nos 50, 51, and 54 Groups were flying training formations transferred from Reserve Command to Flying Training Command when it was formed.

In March 1943 the command included Nos 21, 23, 25, and 29, 50, 51, and 54 Groups.

No. 23 Group RAF was reformed as No 23 (Training) Group in Inland Area on 12 Apr 1926, at RAF Spitalgate, by re-numbering No. 3 Group RAF. Its stations were Digby, Eastchurch, Flowerdown, Manston, and RAF Sealand, while it commanded 1 (Netheravon), 2, and 5 FTSs; the Armament and Gunnery School at Eastchurch; the SoTT (Airmen) at RAF Manston; the Central Flying School at RAF Upavon, and finally the Electrical and Wireless School at RAF Flowerdown. 23 Group was transferred to RAF Training Command on 1 May 1936. The RAF List for 1938 records that it comprised the Central Flying School; 1-3 and 5-11 Flying Training Schools; the Packing Depot at Sealand; the School of Air Navigation and No. 48 Squadron RAF at Manston; the Station Flight and No. 24 MU at Tern Hill; and No. 27 MU at RAF Shawbury. In September 1939 it controlled Nos 1, 2, 3, 5, 6, 7, 9, 10, 11, and 12 Service Flying Training Schools, the Aeroplane and Armament Experimental Establishment at RAF Martlesham Heath, and the group communications flight co-located with Group Headquarters at RAF Spitalgate in Lincolnshire. It was then transferred again to Flying Training Command on 27 May 1940. It was reabsorbed into Training Command in 1968 and disbanded on 2 May 1975.

In mid-1965 the Command was made up of No. 23 Group, No. 25 Group, the RAF College Cranwell, the RAF Staff College, Bracknell, the Central Flying School, and the College of Air Warfare.

Flying Training Command was eventually re-absorbed into the newly re-established Training Command on 1 June 1968.

== RAF Shinfield Park ==
After Flying Training Command left, the Meteorological Office College relocated from Stanmore, Middlesex in October 1971. In 2004 both the College and the Met. Office HQ in Bracknell relocated to Exeter, Devon. The site has since been developed into residential accommodation, although The Lodge, the centrepiece of Shinfield Park and a Georgian listed building, remains and is waiting redevelopment.

== Aircraft operated ==
- Airspeed Oxford
- Avro Anson
- BAC Jet Provost
- de Havilland Mosquito T.III

== Air Officers Commanding-in-Chief ==
Air Officers Commanding-in-Chief were:

- 27 May 1940 Air Marshal Sir Lawrence Pattinson
- 7 Jul 1941 Air Marshal Sir William Welsh
- 17 Aug 1942 Air Marshal Sir Philip Babington
- 6 Oct 1945 Air Marshal Sir Arthur Coningham
- 15 Oct 1947 Air Chief Marshal Sir Ralph Cochrane
- 1 Mar 1950 Air Marshal Sir Hugh Walmsley
- 1 Aug 1952 Air Marshal Sir Lawrence Pendred
- 20 Dec 1955 Air Marshal Sir Richard Atcherley
- 1 Mar 1959 Air Marshal Sir Hugh Constantine
- 24 Sep 1961 Air Marshal Sir Augustus Walker
- 26 Jun 1964 Air Marshal Sir Patrick Dunn
- 1 Oct 1966 Air Marshal Sir John Davis

== See also ==
- List of Royal Air Force commands

Preceded by Training Command	Flying Training Command; 1940–1968	Succeeded by Training Command
