= John Rogers (RAF officer) =

British Royal Air Force commander (1928–2021)

Sir John Rogers
- Born: 11 January 1928
- Died: 11 October 2021 (aged 93); Little Horkesley, Essex, England
- Military career
- Allegiance: United Kingdom
- Branch: Royal Air Force
- Service years: 1950–1986
- Rank: Air Member for Supply and Organisation; Air Chief Marshal
- Commands: RAF Coningsby
- Awards: Knight Commander of the Order of the Bath; Commander of the Order of the British Empire

Air Chief Marshal Sir John Robson Rogers, KCB, CBE (11 January 1928 – 11 October 2021) was a senior Royal Air Force commander.

== RAF career ==
Educated at Brentwood School, Rogers joined the Royal Air Force in 1950. After commanding a fighter squadron he became Station Commander at RAF Coningsby in 1967 and then Deputy Commandant of the RAF College, Cranwell before becoming Director-General of Organisation in 1977. He went on to be Air Officer Commanding Training Units at Support Command in 1979, Air Member for Supply and Organisation in 1981 and Controller of Aircraft in 1983 and he was promoted to air chief marshal at the start of 1984. Rogers retired from the RAF on 31 March 1986.

He was a member of the FIA World Motor Sport Council.

== Family ==
He married Elspeth Campbell; they have two sons and two daughters.

Rogers died on 11 October 2021, at the age of 93.

Military offices
Preceded by Sir Rex Roe	Air Member for Supply and Organisation; 1981–1983	Succeeded by Sir Michael Knight
Preceded by Mr D H Perry	Controller of Aircraft; 1983–1986	Succeeded by Sir David Harcourt-Smith
