= Hardcastle =

Hardcastle is a surname. Notable people and characters with the surname include:

- The Hardcastle family, principal characters in Oliver Goldsmith's play She Stoops to Conquer
- Alex Hardcastle (born 1972), British television director and producer
- Bill Hardcastle (1874–1944), New Zealand-Australian rugby player
- Daniel Hardcastle (born 1989), British YouTuber
- Diana Hardcastle (born 1949), British actress
- Douglas Hardcastle (1886–1915), English footballer
- Edgar Hardcastle (1900–1995), British theorist of Marxist economics
- Edward Hardcastle (1826–1905), British businessman and Conservative politician
- Ernest Hardcastle (1898–1973), English military aviator
- Frances Hardcastle (1866–1941), English mathematician
- Frank Hardcastle (1844–1908), British industrialist and Conservative politician
- Joseph Hardcastle (disambiguation), several people
- Leslie Hardcastle (1926–2023), British arts administrator, later controller of the British Film Institute
- May Hardcastle (1913–2002), Australian tennis player
- Michael Hardcastle (1933–2019), British author of children's sports fiction
- Paul Hardcastle (born 1957), British composer and radio presenter
- Rick Hardcastle (born 1956), Texas politician
- Sally Hardcastle (1945–2014), British journalist and radio presenter
- Sarah Hardcastle (born 1969), English swimmer
- Sexton Hardcastle, ring name of pro wrestler Adam Copeland (born 1973)
- Sonya Hardcastle (born 1972), New Zealand netballer
- William Hardcastle (broadcaster) (1918–1975), British journalist and radio news presenter

== See also ==
- Hardcastle and McCormick, a 1980s television series
