= Quintin Brand =

Royal Air Force Air Vice-Marshal (1893-1968)

Sir Quintin Brand
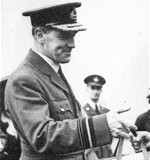
- AVM Brand visiting an air base c. 1941
- Nickname: "Flossie"
- Born: 25 May 1893; Beaconsfield, Cape Colony
- Died: 7 March 1968 (aged 74) Umtali, Rhodesia
- Allegiance: South Africa; United Kingdom
- Branch: Union Defence Force; Royal Air Force
- Service years: 1913–1943
- Rank: Air Vice-Marshal
- Commands: No. 20 Group (1941–43); No. 10 Group (1940–41); No. 56 Squadron (1923–25); No. 44 Squadron (1919); No. 151 Squadron (1918–19); No. 112 Squadron (1918)
- Conflicts: First World War; Second World War * Battle of Britain
- Awards: Knight Commander of the Order of the British Empire; Distinguished Service Order; Military Cross; Distinguished Flying Cross; Order of Ismail (Egypt)

Air Vice-Marshal Sir Christopher Joseph Quintin Brand, KBE, DSO, MC, DFC (25 May 1893 – 7 March 1968) was a South African officer of the Royal Air Force.

== Early life ==
Brand was born in Beaconsfield (now part of Kimberley, Northern Cape) in South Africa to a CID Inspector in the Johannesburg police. He joined the South African Defence Force in 1913.

== First World War ==
During the years 1914–1915, Brand continued to serve in the Union Defence Force.

In 1915, Brand travelled to England, where he transferred to the Royal Flying Corps. He learned to fly and was awarded Royal Aero Club Certificate No 3949 on 30 March 1916. During the First World War, he flew Nieuport 17 scouts, serving in No. 1 Squadron RFC in France as a flight commander before being posted back to England.

In February 1918, Brand became commander of 112 Squadron, a home defence night fighter squadron equipped with specially modified Sopwith Camels flying from Throwley in Kent, shooting down a Gotha bomber over Faversham on 19 May. He was then appointed commander of No. 151 Squadron RAF at Fontaine-sur-Maye in France, a night fighter squadron formed to combat German night raids over the Western Front. The squadron downed 26 German aircraft with Brand himself shooting down four, becoming the highest scoring RAF night fighter pilot of the First World War. Brand claimed 12 victories in 1917 and 1918 (seven victories with No 1 Squadron, four with 151 Squadron and one with 112 Squadron) and was awarded the Distinguished Flying Cross during this period.

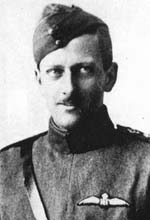
Lt. Christopher Quintin Brand, No 1 RFC, c. 1917

== Inter-war years ==
In 1920, The Times offered a prize of £10,000 for the first pilot to fly from London to Cape Town, South Africa. General Smuts wanted South African aviators to blaze this trail, and subsequently authorised the purchase of a Vickers Vimy, G-UABA named Silver Queen at a cost of £4,500. Pilots Lieutenant Colonel Pierre van Ryneveld (commander) and Captain Quintin Brand (co-pilot) formed the crew for the record-breaking flight.

Leaving Brooklands on 4 February 1920, they landed safely at Heliopolis, but on the flight to Wadi Halfa, they were forced to land due to engine overheating with 80 miles still to go. A second Vimy was loaned to the pair by the RAF at Heliopolis (and named Silver Queen II). In this second aircraft, the pair continued to Bulawayo in Southern Rhodesia where the aircraft was badly damaged when it crashed on takeoff.; van Rynevald and Brand then borrowed an Airco DH.9 to continue the journey to Cape Town. They were disqualified as winners but nevertheless the South African government awarded them £5,000 each. Along with van Rynevald, Brand was knighted in 1920 for his role in the record attempt.

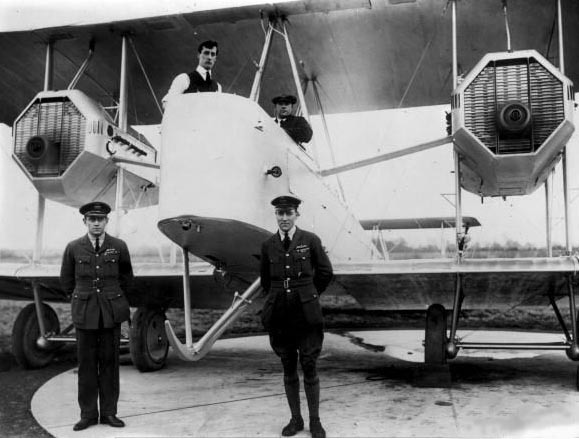
(L-R) Lieutenant Colonel van Ryneveld with Captain Brand, February 1920, standing in front of Vickers Vimy, G-UABA, the Silver Queen, before setting out on an England to South Africa Flight

From 1925 to 1927, Brand was Senior Technical Officer, then Principal Technical Officer, at the Royal Aircraft Establishment, Farnborough. In 1929, he was posted to Abu Qir (Aboukir) Egypt, later appointed Director-General of Aviation in Egypt from 1932 to 1936.

== Second World War ==
During the Second World War, Brand was air officer commanding No. 10 (Fighter) Group, 10 Fighter Battle Group, responsible for the defence of southwest England and South Wales. Brand actively supported Air Vice Marshal Keith Park, in advocating the use of small, rapidly deployed, groups of fighters to intercept the Luftwaffe raiders. Under Brand's command 10 Group played a vital role in the Battle of Britain by defending southwest England against Luftwaffe raids and providing support to 11 Group (which bore the brunt of the battle in southeast England) as required. He later became the air officer commanding No. 20 (Training) Group. Upon retirement on 6 November 1943, Brand had attained the rank of air vice-marshal. Brand's part in the Big Wing controversy following the Battle of Britain, in which he supported Dowding and Park, may explain why he was sidelined despite being one of the RAF's more capable commanders.

== Later years ==
After retiring from the regular forces, Brand married Mildred Vaughan in 1943; he had married her sister Marie in 1920, but Marie died in 1941. The Brands lived in Surrey until 1950, when they moved to Southern Rhodesia. Quintin Brand died on 7 March 1968.

== Honours and awards ==
- 26 April 1917 – 2nd Lt. (temp. Capt.) Christopher Joseph Quintin Brand, RFC, Spec. Res. – awarded the Military Cross:
  For conspicuous gallantry and devotion to duty whilst on patrol with one other machine. He attacked a formation of five hostile machines and shot one of them down in flames. On another occasion he brought down two hostile machines. He has at all times shown great courage and initiative.
- 31 May 1918 – Lt (T./Capt.) Christopher Joseph Quintin Brand, MC, RAF – Awarded the Distinguished Service Order for gallant services rendered on the occasion of an hostile air raid:
  For conspicuous gallantry. While on patrol at night he encountered an enemy aeroplane at a height of 8,700 feet. He at once attacked the enemy, firing two burst of twenty rounds each, which put the enemy's right engine out of action. Closing to range of twenty-five yards he fired a further three bursts of twenty-five rounds each, and as a result the enemy machine caught fire and fell in flames to the ground. Captain Brand showed great courage and skill in manoeuvering his machine during the encounter, and when the enemy aeroplane burst into flames he was so close that the flames enveloped his machine, scorching his face. This officer has shown great determination and perseverance during the past nine months when on anti-aeroplane patrols at night, and his example of unassuming gallantry and skill has raised his squadron to a very high state of efficiency.
- 14 May 1920 – Flight Lieutenant Christopher Joseph Quintin Brand, DSO, MC, DFC, Royal Air Force – Appointed a Knight Commander of the Order of the British Empire in recognition of the valuable services rendered to Aviation by the successful flight from England to Cape Town, South Africa.

== Military service timeline ==
Date	Event
1913	Soldier/Officer, South African Defence Force
15 March 1916	U/T (Under Training) Pilot, Special Reserve RFC, rank: Second Lieutenant (P)
14 May 1916	Pilot, No 1 Squadron, RFC. (Nieuport 17 – Western Front)
1 June 1916	Promoted to Second Lieutenant
15 February 1917	Flight Commander, No 1 Squadron, RFC, rank: Captain (T)
1 April 1917	Rank: Lieutenant
26 April 1917	Military Cross (MC)
1 May 1917	Posted to England
30 July 1917	Flight Commander, No 112 Squadron, RFC, (Sopwith Pup, Sopwith Camel – Throwley, UK)
13 February 1918	Promoted to Major (T), Officer Commanding, No 112 Squadron RFC/RAF
9 July 1918	Officer Commanding, No 151 Squadron RAF. (Sopwith Camel – Western Front)
1 April 1918	Rank: (T) Captain (Lieutenant)
19 April 1918	Rank: (T) Major
31 May 1918	Distinguished Service Order (DSO)
3 December 1918	Distinguished Flying Cross (DFC)
March 1919	Officer Commanding, No 44 Squadron RAF. (Sopwith Camel – Hainault Farm/North Weald, UK)
1 May 1919	Graded as Major (A)
1 August 1919	Awarded Permanent RAF Commission as a Captain
4 February 1920	Attached to South African Defence Force for "Flight to South Africa"
7 May 1920	Qualified Flight Instructor (QFI) rating, Royal Air Force Flying Training School (FTS)
14 May 1920	Knight Commander of the Order of the British Empire (KBE)
30 September 1920	Attended Cambridge University
1 January 1922	Rank: Squadron Leader
20 April 1923	Staff, HQ No 5 Wing, Inland Area (Middle East)
24 September 1923	Officer Commanding, No 56 Squadron RAF. (Sopwith Snipe/Gloster Grebe)
22 September 1925	Senior Technical Officer, Royal Aircraft Establishment
1927	Principal Technical Officer, Royal Aircraft Establishment
29 January 1929	Engineering Officer, Aircraft Depot, Iraq
1 July 1929	Rank: Wing Commander
9 August 1929	Senior Engineering Officer, RAF Depot, Middle East
1 August 1932	Seconded to Egyptian Government as Director-General of Aviation
1 July 1935	Rank: Group Captain
30 March 1936	Order of Ismail, Egypt (OI[E])
10 April 1936	Supernumerary, HQ No 6 (Auxiliary) Group
11 July 1936	Director of Repair and Maintenance
1 November 1938	Rank: Air Commodore
15 June 1940	Air Officer Commander (AOC), No 10 (Fighter) Group, rank: Acting Air Vice Marshal
1 July 1940	Rank: (T) Air Vice Marshal
25 July 1941	AOC, No 20 (Training) Group
6 November 1943	Retired: Air Vice Marshal (Retained)

Military offices
Vacant Title last held by Napier Gill in 1932	Air Officer Commanding No. 10 Group; 1940–1941	Succeeded by Augustus Orlebar
Preceded by Arthur Capel	Air Officer Commanding No. 20 Group; 1941–1943	Group absorbed into No. 22 Group
