= RAF Shinfield Park =

Former RAF base in Berkshire, England

RAF Shinfield Park
- Near Reading, Berkshire in England

Site information
- Type: Royal Air Force station
- Owner: Ministry of Defence
- Operator: Royal Air Force

Location
- Shown within Berkshire RAF Shinfield Park (the United Kingdom)
- Coordinates: 51°25′10″N 000°57′01″W

Site history
- Built: 1940
- In use: 1940 - 1977
- Battles/wars: European theatre of World War II

RAF Shinfield Park was a Royal Air Force administrative site in the south of Reading, Berkshire. It served as the Met Office residential training college from 1971 until 2002. The European Centre for Medium-Range Weather Forecasts was built on part of the site in 1978.

== History ==
The site is adjacent to the west side of the A327 road in the south of the Reading area, near the current roundabout with the B3270. Adjacent to the south is the former Shire Hall of Berkshire County Council, and the M4. Adjacent to the north is the independent Crosfields School, built on a former part of the RAF site. To the west is Whitley Wood. Although it was built as a part of Berkshire, the current site is in the civil parish of Shinfield, in the Borough of Wokingham.

The RAF station was built on the Shinfield Lodge Estate. The site had been owned by Ebenezer Maitland in the 1700s.

=== RAF Flying Training Command ===
For many years it was the headquarters of RAF Flying Training Command (HQFTC) from 27 May 1940 until 1 June 1968. From 1940 until 1945, it was also the headquarters of RAF Technical Training Command.

=== RAF Training Command ===
From 1 June 1968 to 13 June 1977 it was the headquarters of RAF Training Command. In June 1977 RAF Training Command became part of RAF Support Command, situated at RAF Brampton in Cambridgeshire.

=== Meteorological Office College ===
It became the Meteorological Office College in October 1971, who had moved from Stanmore in north-west London. The Met Office College, when under Peter Ewins, left in 2002, briefly staying at South Devon College, before moving to Exeter in 2004. The Met Office College trained not just British meteorologists, but TV weather presenters across Europe. TV weather presenters would receive an intensive 18-week course in meteorology.

=== ECMWF ===
The European Centre for Medium-Range Weather Forecasts was established next to the Met Office College in 1978. It is known for its Integrated Forecast System. It has around 100 staff. The site had been agreed to be built following a meeting of 18 countries in Brussels in March 1973. It looked at forecasts from four to ten days hence.

=== Recent development ===
Most of the site has been turned into housing. Shinfield Lodge has Grade II listing.

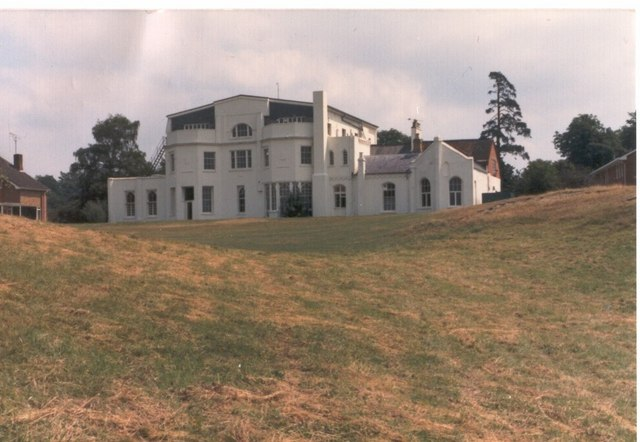
Shinfield Lodge in 1984

== See also ==
- Shinfield Grange Estate, 478-acre site on the other side of the M4, formerly owned by the University of Reading from 1949, and owned previous to that by Sir Eric Palmer of Huntley & Palmers
- List of former Royal Air Force stations
