= Arthur Capell (disambiguation) =

Arthur Capell (1902–1986) was an Australian linguist.

Arthur Capell may also refer to:

- Arthur Capell, 1st Earl of Essex (1631–1683), English statesman
- Arthur Capell, 1st Baron Capell of Hadham (1608–1649), English politician
- Arthur Capell, 6th Earl of Essex (1803–1892)
- Arthur John Capel (1894–1979), British Royal Air Force officer

== See also ==
- Arthur Capel (1881–1919), polo player and lover of Coco Chanel
