= Reginald Harland =

Royal Air Force Air Marshal (1920–2013)

Sir Reginald Harland
- Born: 30 May 1920
- Died: 30 July 2013 (aged 93)
- Military career
- Allegiance: United Kingdom
- Branch: Royal Air Force
- Service years: 1939–77
- Rank: Air Marshal
- Commands: Support Command (1973–77); Maintenance Command (1973); No. 24 Group (1970–72); RAF Swanton Morley (1960–62)
- Conflicts: Second World War
- Awards: Knight Commander of the Order of the British Empire; Companion of the Order of the Bath; Air Efficiency Award

Air Marshal Sir Reginald Edward Wynyard Harland, KBE, CB, AE (30 May 1920 – 30 July 2013) was a senior Royal Air Force commander.

== Military career ==
Educated at Summerfields (Summer Fields School), Oxford, Stowe School and Trinity College, Cambridge, Harland joined the Royal Air Force Volunteer Reserve in 1939 before the outbreak of the Second World War. He transferred to the Technical Branch in 1941 and worked at the Royal Aircraft Establishment in Farnborough. Then, in 1942, he became an engineer to No.241 Squadron in Algeria, Tunisia and Italy and, in 1944, went with No.63 Repair and Salvage Unit to Corsica and the South of France before becoming an engineer officer with HQ No. 214 Group in Italy.

After three years at the Air Ministry in London, he was trained as a pilot before going as Chief Engineering Instructor at the RAF Cadet College at Cranwell. He then went on a guided weapons course with the Army at Shrivenham. In 1953 he became Project Officer responsible for the Thunderbird missile at the Royal Aircraft Establishment. After a course at the RAF Staff College, he was posted to Los Angeles as Ballistic Missile Liaison Officer at the USAF Missile Division there.

He became Officer Commanding the Central Servicing Development Establishment at RAF Swanton Morley in 1960, Senior Technical Staff Officer at Headquarters No. 3 Group in 1962 and Air Officer in charge of Engineering at Headquarters Far East Air Force in 1964. He went on to be Project Director for the Harrier Project at the Ministry of Technology in 1967, Air Officer Commanding No. 24 Group in 1970 and Air Officer in charge of Engineering at Headquarters RAF Air Support Command in 1972. He was appointed Air Officer Commanding-in-Chief at RAF Maintenance Command in June 1973 and then Air Officer Commanding-in-Chief at RAF Support Command in August 1973. He was President of the Society of Environmental Engineers from 1974 to 1977. He retired from the RAF in 1977.

In retirement he became a Technical Director with W. S. Atkins. He was a Member of the Board of the Council of Engineering Institutions from 1980 to 1984 and vice-chairman from 1983 to 1984. He stood as a Social Democrat for the constituency of Bury St Edmunds in the 1983 and 1987 elections. He lived in the town and was President of the Bury St Edmunds Society, a local preservation group. He died on 30 July 2013.

== Family ==
In 1942 he married Doreen Romanis, born in Harley Street, the daughter of the well known surgeon W H C Romanis, and elder sister of comedian Tony Hancock's first wife. Lady Harland died in November 2011.

Sir Reginald and Lady Harland had three sons (one of whom is deceased) and two daughters (one of whom is deceased).

He was the great-nephew of British shipbuilder, Sir Edward Harland, and a relative of geologist, W. Brian Harland.

Military offices
Preceded by Sir John Rowlands	Air Officer Commanding-in-Chief Maintenance Command; June – August 1973	Succeeded by Command disbanded
Preceded by New post	Air Officer Commanding-in-Chief Support Command; 1973–1977	Succeeded by Sir Rex Roe
