= No. 20 Group RAF =

Former Royal Air Force operations group

No. 20 (Training) Group RAF
- Royal Air Force Ensign
- Active: 1 April 1918 – 1 October 1919; 30 November 1939 – 1 August 1943
- Disbanded: 1 August 1943
- Country: United Kingdom
- Branch: Royal Air Force
- Type: Royal Air Force group
- Role: Military aviation training
- Part of: RAF Training Command (November 1939 – May 1940); RAF Technical Training Command (May 1940 – August 1943)
- Garrison/HQ: Buntingsdale Hall (1939–1943)

Commanders
- Notable commanders: Air Vice-Marshal Sir Christopher Joseph Quintin Brand KBE, DSO, MC, DFC

No. 20 Group RAF (20 Gp) is a former Royal Air Force group which disbanded on 1 August 1943. It initially existed between 1918 and 1919, and then again between 1939 and 1943.

== History ==
=== First World War ===
No. 20 Group formed on 1 April 1918 within No. 5 Area, in Edinburgh on 1 April 1918. On 8 May 1918, No. 5 Area was redesignated North-Western Area. It absorbed No. 21 Group on 1 July, and was then redesignated as No. 20 (Training) Group on 8 August. On 1 October 1919, No. 20 Group was absorbed into No. 17 Group.

=== Second World War ===
On 30 November 1939 No. 20 (Training) Group reformed at Buntingsdale Hall, Market Drayton, in Shropshire, within RAF Training Command. A number of various Technical Training Schools and Recruits Receiving Centres, were initially within No. 20 (Training) Group. On 27 May 1940, No. 20 Group was transferred into RAF Technical Training Command. On 1 August 1943, the group was absorbed into No. 22 Group RAF.

== Structure ==
=== Schools and Centres ===
At formation, No. 20 Group was initially responsible for various Technical Training Schools and Recruits Receiving Centres:

Schools of Technical Training

- No. 3 School of Technical Training RAF
- No. 6 School of Technical Training RAF
- No. 8 School of Technical Training RAF
- No. 9 School of Technical Training RAF
- No. 10 School of Technical Training RAF

Recruits Receiving Centre

- No. 3 Recruit Receiving Centre RAF
- No. 4 Recruit Receiving Centre RAF
- No. 5 Recruit Receiving Centre RAF
- No. 6 Recruit Receiving Centre RAF
- No. 7 Recruit Receiving Centre RAF

== Air Officer Commanding ==
Note: The ranks shown are the ranks held at the time of holding the appointment of Air Officer Commanding, No. 20 Group Royal Air Force.

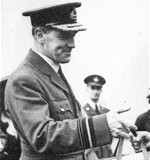
Air Vice Marshal Sir Christopher Joseph Quintin Brand KBE, DSO, MC, DFC

No. 20 Group commanding officers
Rank	name	from
Lieutenant colonel	Sir William Gore Sutherland Mitchell	April 1918
Disbanded		September 1919
Air Vice-Marshal	Sir Lionel McKean	December 1939
Air Vice-Marshal	Arthur John Capel	March 1941
Air Vice-Marshal	Sir Quintin Brand	July 1941
