= No. 151 Squadron RAF =

Defunct flying squadron of the Royal Air Force

- Active: 12 Jun 1918 - 10 Sep 1919; 4 Aug 1936 - 10 Oct 1946; 15 Sep 1951 - 19 Sep 1961; 1 Jan 1962 – 25 May 1963; 21 Sep 1981 – 23 Sep 1992
- Country: United Kingdom
- Branch: Royal Air Force
- Size: squadron
- Mottos: French: Foy pour devoir (Translation: "Fidelity unto duty" or "Faith for duty" or "Fidelity into duty")

Commanders
- Notable commanders: Edward Mortlock "Teddy" Donaldson

Insignia
- Squadron Badge heraldry: On a hurt, an owl affrontée wings elevated, alighting on a seax The owl represents No. 151 Squadron's role of night-fighting whilst the seax comes from the arms of Essex in which county the squadron was formed
- Squadron Codes: TV (Sep 1938 - Dec 1938); GG (Dec 1938 - Sep 1939); DZ (Sep 1939 - Oct 1946)
- Post 1950 squadron roundel

No. 151 Squadron was a squadron of the Royal Air Force.

== History ==
=== World War I ===
No. 151 squadron was founded at Hainault Farm in Essex on 12 June 1918, and was equipped with Sopwith Camel aircraft. During the five months in which 151 Squadron had taken part in hostilities overseas, the total number of hours flown by night was 1443 hrs 26 mins.

Sixteen enemy aircraft were destroyed at night on the Allies side of the lines, and five were destroyed on the enemy side and confirmed. Another five were unconfirmed, thus making a total of twenty six successful engagements. Of the enemy aircraft destroyed, twenty two were AEGs, Friedrichshafen or Gothas, with two engines and carrying a crew of three or more. Two were giant P 52's with five engines carrying a crew of up to eight or nine.

During all the numerous combats there were very few occasions when the guns jammed or caused trouble, reflecting the devotion to duty of Lt Eggar and his gunnery staff.

Too much cannot be said for the NCOs and men of the Squadron. The long hours from dawn to dusk and the urgent necessity of getting all machines serviceable during the daytime was evidence of their keen spirit and esprit de corps, and nothing was more gratifying to a pilot on landing after a successful combat than to hear the rousing cheers of the NCOs and men of his Flight, echoed by the Squadron, that greeted him."

— George Kelsey on www.151squadron.org,

The squadron was disbanded on 10 September 1919.

=== World War II ===
On 4 August 1936 the squadron was reformed at RAF North Weald from 'B' Flight of 56 Squadron, as a fighter squadron, flying Gloster Gauntlets. In December 1938 these were exchanged for Hawker Hurricanes, when the squadron came under Squadron Leader Edward Mortlock Donaldson. It operated throughout the Second World War, flying with Hawker Hurricanes, Boulton Paul Defiants and later de Havilland Mosquitoes, disbanding on 10 October 1946 at RAF Weston Zoyland. One of its most successful pilots was Flight Lieutenant Richard Stevens, who destroyed 15 aircraft during 1941 while flying the Hurricane during The Blitz.

=== After World War II ===
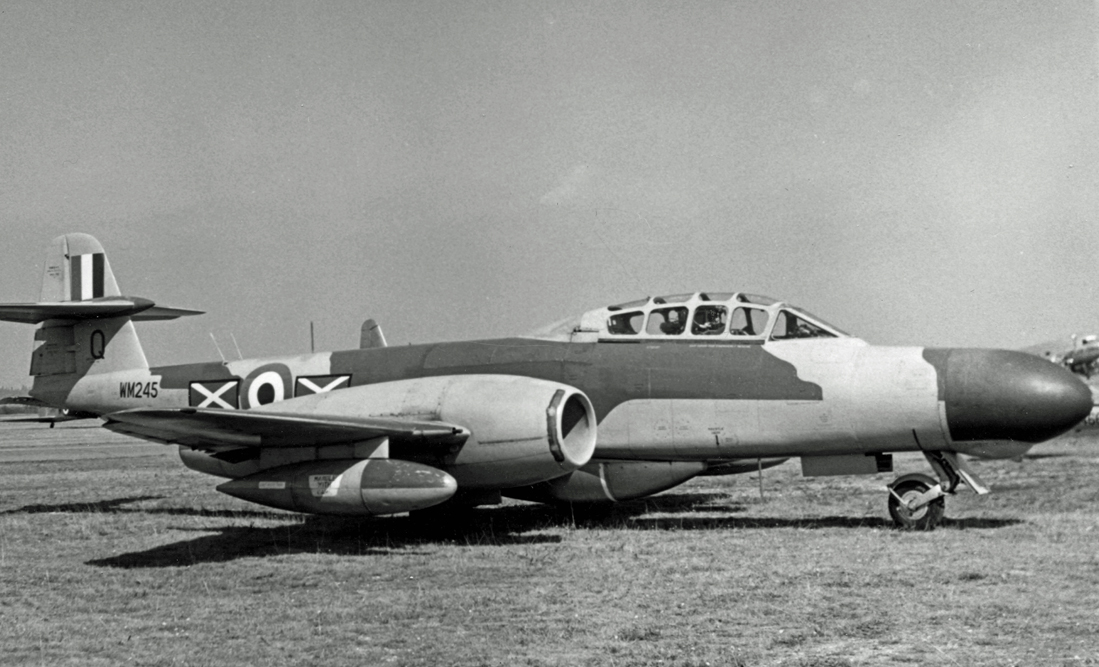
151 Squadron Gloster Meteor NF.11 night fighter in September 1955

The squadron was reformed again at RAF Leuchars, Scotland on 15 September 1951 as a night fighter unit, initially operating De Havilland Vampire NF.10s and later Gloster Meteor NF.11s. It disbanded on 19 September 1961.

On 1 January 1962 the Signals Development Squadron at RAF Watton was redesignated as No. 151 Squadron operating a variety of aircraft on development and training duties. It was joined by the pilots and ground crew from the disbanded No. 97 (Strategic Missile) Squadron from RAF Hemswell on 25 May 1963.

On 18 September 1981 151 Squadron reformed at RAF Chivenor as part of No. 2 Tactical Weapons Unit RAF (2 TWU) operating BAE Hawk T1 & T1A aircraft. When 2 TWU became No. 7 Flying Training School RAF in 1992, 151 Squadron was disbanded and its duties taken over by 92 Squadron.

== Aircraft operated ==
Aircraft operated by no. 151 Squadron RAF, data from
From	To	Aircraft	Version
June 1918	February 1919	Sopwith Camel	
August 1936	March 1939	Gloster Gauntlet	Mk.II
December 1938	June 1941	Hawker Hurricane	Mk.I
December 1940	October 1941	Boulton Paul Defiant	Mk.I
June 1941	January 1942	Hawker Hurricane	Mk.IIc
September 1941	July 1942	Boulton Paul Defiant	Mk.II
April 1942	July 1943	de Havilland Mosquito	Mk.II
July 1943	March 1944	de Havilland Mosquito	Mk.XII
August 1943	August 1943	de Havilland Mosquito	Mk.VI
December 1943	September 1944	de Havilland Mosquito	Mk.XIII
July 1944	September 1944	de Havilland Mosquito	Mk.VI
August 1944	October 1946	de Havilland Mosquito	Mk.XXX
February 1952	August 1953	de Havilland Vampire	NF.10
March 1953	October 1955	Gloster Meteor	NF.11
September 1955	June 1957	de Havilland Venom	NF.3
June 1957	September 1961	Gloster Javelin	FAW.5
January 1962	April 1963	Avro Lincoln	B.2
January 1962	May 1963	Handley Page Hastings	C.1 & C.2
January 1962	May 1963	Vickers Varsity	T.1
January 1962	May 1963	English Electric Canberra	B.2
September 1981	September 1992	BAE Hawk	T.1 & T.1A

== Squadron bases ==
Bases and airfields used by no. 151 Squadron RAF, data from
From	To	Location	Remark
12 June 1918	16 June 1918	Hainault Farm	Squadron formed
16 June 1918	21 June 1918	Marquise, Pas-de-Calais, France	
21 June 1918	25 June 1918	Fontaine-sur-Maye, France	
25 June 1918	2 July 1918	Famechon, Somme, France	
2 July 1918	8 September 1918	Fontaine-sur-Maye, France	
8 September 1918	24 October 1918	Vignacourt, France	
24 October 1918	5 December 1918	Bancourt, France	
5 December 1918	21 February 1919	Liettres, France	
21 February 1919	10 September 1919	RAF Drem, Scotland	Squadron disbanded
4 August 1936	13 May 1940	RAF North Weald	Squadron reformed
28 February 1940	12 May 1940	RAF Martlesham Heath	Detachment
12 May 1940	17 May 1940	RAF Martlesham Heath	Complete squadron
17 May 1940	18 May 1940	RAF Manston	
18 May 1940	20 May 1940	Vitry-en-Artois, France	
20 May 1940	29 August 1940	RAF North Weald	
29 August 1940	1 September 1940	RAF Stapleford Tawney	
1 September 1940	28 November 1940	RAF Digby	
28 November 1940	6 December 1940	RAF Bramcote	
6 December 1940	30 April 1943	RAF Wittering	
22 April 1941	25 January 1942	RAF Coltishall	Detachment
30 April 1943	16 August 1943	RAF Colerne	
16 August 1943	17 November 1943	RAF Middle Wallop	
17 November 1943	24 March 1944	RAF Colerne	
24 March 1944	7 October 1944	RAF Predannack	
7 October 1944	19 November 1944	RAF Castle Camps	
19 November 1944	1 March 1945	RAF Hunsdon	
1 March 1945	17 May 1945	RAF Bradwell Bay	
17 May 1945	1 June 1945	RAF Predannack	
1 June 1945	8 July 1946	RAF Exeter	
8 July 1946	10 October 1946	RAF Weston Zoyland	Squadron disbanded
15 September 1951	17 June 1957	RAF Leuchars	Squadron reformed
17 June 1957	15 November 1957	RAF Turnhouse	
15 November 1957	19 September 1961	RAF Leuchars	Squadron disbanded
1 January 1962	25 May 1963	RAF Watton	Squadron reformed and renumbered
18 September 1981	4 August 1992	RAF Chivenor	Shadow Squadron reformed and disbanded

== Commanding officers ==
data from
From	To	Name
Jun 1918	Jul 1918	Maj M Green, DSO, MC
Jul 1918	Feb 1919	Maj C J Q Brand, DSO, MC, DFC
Aug 1936	Nov 1938	Sqn Ldr W V Hyde
Dec 1938	Aug 1940	Sqn Ldr E M Donaldson, DSO, DFC
Aug 1940	Sep 1940	Sqn Ldr J A G Gordon
Sep 1940	Sep 1940	Sqn Ldr G King
Sep 1940	Dec 1940	Sqn Ldr West
Dec 1940	Oct 1941	Sqn Ldr Adams, DFC
Oct 1941	Feb 1942	Sqn Ldr McDougall
Feb 1942	Mar 1943	Wg Cdr I S Smith, DFC
Mar 1943	May 1943	Wg Cdr D V Ivins
May 1943	Oct 1943	Wg Cdr S P Richards, AFC
Oct 1943	Dec 1944	Wg Cdr G H Goodman DSO, DFC
Dec 1944	1946	Sqn Ldr J A Wright DFC
1946		Sqn Ldr P S Q Andersen
1951	1953	Sqn Ldr D Boyle
1953	1956	Sqn Ldr D B Ainsworth
May 1956	Oct 1956	Sqn Ldr I Cosby
Oct 1956	Mar 1958	Sqn Ldr Boardman
Mar 1958	Oct 1958	Sqn Ldr J W Frost
Oct 1958	Jan 1961	Sqn Ldr L C P Martin
Jan 1961	Sep 1961	Sqn Ldr D O Luke
Sep 1981	Dec 1983	Sqn Ldr R Bealer
Jan 1983	Feb 1983	Sqn Ldr D Sharp
Feb 1983	Nov 1984	Sqn Ldr J A Hall
Nov 1984	Jan 1987	Sqn Ldr R F Burroughs
Jan 1987	1992	Sqn Ldr G P H Croasdale
