= Michael Beavis =

Royal Air Force Air Chief Marshal (1929-2020)

Sir Michael Beavis
- Born: 13 August 1929
- Died: 7 June 2020 (aged 90); Pissouri, Cyprus
- Burial place: Pissouri, Cyprus
- Military career
- Allegiance: United Kingdom
- Branch: Royal Air Force
- Service years: 1947–87
- Rank: Air Chief Marshal
- Commands: Support Command (1981–84); RAF Staff College, Bracknell (1980–81); No. 10 Squadron (1966–68)
- Awards: Knight Commander of the Order of the Bath; Commander of the Order of the British Empire; Air Force Cross

Air Chief Marshal Sir Michael Gordon Beavis, KCB, CBE, AFC (13 August 1929 – 7 June 2020) was a Royal Air Force officer who served as Air Officer Commanding-in-Chief Support Command from 1981 to 1984.

== RAF career ==
Educated at Kilburn Grammar School, Beavis joined the Royal Air Force in 1947 and was commissioned two years later. In June 1961 Beavis set the record for the fastest non-stop flight from the UK to Australia which he established by flying a Vulcan from RAF Scampton to RAAF Richmond in just over 20 hours.

He became Officer Commanding No. 10 Squadron flying VC10s in 1966 and Group Captain Flying at RAF Akrotiri in 1968. He was appointed Assistant Director of Defence Policy at the Ministry of Defence in 1971, Senior Air Staff Officer at Headquarters RAF Germany in 1976 and Director General of RAF Training in 1977. He went on to be Commandant of the RAF Staff College, Bracknell in 1980, Air Officer Commanding-in-Chief at Support Command in 1981 and Deputy Commander-in-Chief Allied Forces Central Europe in 1984 before retiring in 1987.

Beavis was appointed a Knight Commander of the Order of the Bath (KCB) in the 1981 Birthday Honours.

== Family ==
In 1949 he married Joy Marion Jones; they had one son and one daughter. He died in Cyprus on 7 June 2020.

Military offices
Preceded by John Curtiss	Commandant of the RAF Staff College, Bracknell; 1980–1981	Succeeded by David Parry-Evans
Preceded by Sir John Gingell	Commander-in-Chief Support Command; 1981–1984	Succeeded by Sir David Harcourt-Smith
Preceded by Sir John Gingell	Deputy Commander-in-Chief Allied Forces Central Europe; 1984–1986	Succeeded by Sir Joseph Gilbert
