= John Whitworth-Jones =

Royal Air Force Air Chief Marshal (1896-1981)

Sir John Whitworth-Jones
- Born: 28 February 1896
- Died: 4 February 1981 (aged 84)
- Military career
- Allegiance: United Kingdom
- Branch: British Army (1912–18); Royal Air Force (1918–54)
- Service years: 1912–54
- Rank: Air Chief Marshal
- Commands: Air Member for Supply and Organisation (1952–54); Technical Training Command (1948–52); AHQ Malaya (1947–48); No 9 (Fighter) Group (1942–43); No. 208 Squadron (1933–36); No. 13 Squadron (1931–33)
- Conflicts: First World War; Second World War
- Awards: Knight Grand Cross of the Order of the British Empire; Knight Commander of the Order of the Bath; Mentioned in Despatches; Commander of the Order of the Crown (Belgium)

Air Chief Marshal Sir John Whitworth-Jones, GBE, KCB (28 February 1896 – 4 February 1981) was a pilot in the First World War and a senior Royal Air Force commander during the Second World War. After the latter he held several senior RAF appointments before his retirement in 1954.

== Military career ==
Born the son of Lieutenant Colonel Aylmer Jones and his wife Lilian (née Cookworthy). His elder brother was Felix Aylmer. Jones was educated at Magdalen College School in Oxford and also at St Paul's School. He joined the territorial army in 1912 and went to France as a Bugler aged 18 with the 517th (2nd London) division of the Royal Engineers. He was commissioned as a second lieutenant on the Royal Flying Corps general list on 13 April 1917 during the First World War. Later in the war he served as a pilot in No. 47 Squadron and No. 21 Squadron. He was made Officer Commanding No. 13 Squadron in 1931 and Officer Commanding No. 208 Squadron in 1933 before joining the Air Staff in the Deputy Directorate of Operations (Home) at the Air Ministry in 1936.

He served in the Second World War as Director of Fighter Operations from 1940, Air Officer Commanding No 9 (Fighter) Group from 1942 and Assistant Deputy Chief of Staff at South East Asia Command from 1943. He went on to be Director-General of Organisation at the Air Ministry in June 1945.

After the war he was Air Officer Commanding AHQ Malaya, Air Officer Commanding-in-Chief Technical Training Command and then Air Member for Supply and Organisation before retiring in 1954.

Military offices
Preceded by Charles Steele	Air Officer Commanding No. 9 Group; 1942–1943	Succeeded by Leslie Norman Hollinghurst
Preceded by John Breakey	Air Officer Commanding Air Headquarters Malaya; 1947–1948	Succeeded by Clifford Sanderson
Preceded by Sir Ralph Sorley	Air Officer Commanding-in-Chief Technical Training Command; 1948–1952	Succeeded by Sir Victor Groom
Preceded by Sir William Dickson	Air Member for Supply and Organisation; 1952–1954	Succeeded by Sir Donald Hardman
