= John Sutton (RAF officer) =

Royal Air Force Air Marshal (1932-2014)

Sir John Sutton
- Born: 9 July 1932
- Died: 21 November 2014 (aged 82)
- Military career
- Allegiance: United Kingdom
- Branch: Royal Air Force
- Service years: 1950–1989
- Rank: Air Marshal
- Commands: RAF Support Command (1986–89); Central Flying School (1976–77); No. 14 Squadron RAF (1970–71); No. 249 Squadron RAF (1964–66)
- Conflicts: Indonesia–Malaysia confrontation
- Awards: Knight Commander of the Order of the Bath; Queen's Commendation for Valuable Service in the Air

Air Marshal Sir John Matthias Dobson Sutton, KCB (9 July 1932 – 21 November 2014) was a Royal Air Force officer who served as Air Officer Commanding-in-Chief at RAF Support Command from 1986 to 1989 and Lieutenant Governor of Jersey from 1990 to 1995.

== Early life ==
His mother was the Grimsby singer Gertrude Dobson, of 'Alandale' on Weelsby Road, who married Harry Rowston Sutton on Wednesday 16 September 1931 at Grimsby Minster by the vicar of Bilsby. Harry worked at a brewers in Alford. But there was something a little peculiar. Gertrude's sister Jessie had married Frank, the brother of Harry Sutton, on Monday 29 June 1931, at Grimsby Minster, by the vicar of Bilsby. Both Frank and Harry had attended Alford Grammar School.

The father of Harry and Frank was Matthias and Emmeline Sutton, who had run the 'Anchor Inn', for seven years, and the 'Windmill Hotel', for ten years, in Alford. Matthias Sutton died on 2 August 1931, aged 55. Emmeline Sutton ran the hotel for another fifteen years. Emelline (née Rowston) died on 21 November 1948, aged 70.

He was born at the County Nursing Home in Cleethorpes. He was the son of Mr Harry Sutton of 'Clovelly, 119 West Street, in Alford. His mother Gertrude died in May 1979.

== RAF career ==
Educated at Queen Elizabeth's Grammar School, Alford, Sutton joined the Royal Air Force in 1950. He was appointed Officer Commanding No. 249 Squadron in 1964 and then became Assistant Secretary of the Chiefs of Staff Committee at the Ministry of Defence in 1966. He went on to be Officer Commanding No. 14 Squadron in 1970, Assistant Chief of Staff (Plans & Policy) at Headquarters Second Tactical Air Force in 1971 and Assistant Chief of the Air Staff (Policy) in 1977. He then became Deputy Commander of RAF Germany in 1980, Assistant Chief of the Defence Staff (Commitments) in 1982 and Assistant Chief of the Defence Staff (Overseas) in 1985. He became Air Officer Commanding-in-Chief at RAF Support Command in 1986 and retired in 1989.

== Governorship and later life ==
In retirement, Sutton was made Lieutenant Governor of Jersey. He attended a reunion of Lieutenant Governors in 2008. He died on 21 November 2014.

== Personal life ==
In 1954 Sutton married on Saturday 25 September 1954 at Inverness Cathedral. His wife Cherry (Delia Eleanor Woodward) was from Caledonian Road in Inverness. They had one son and one daughter. His daughter was born 22 January 1957, in Germany, and his son was born in February 1961, in Middlesex.

Following the dissolution of his first marriage he married Angela Faith Gray, at Golant in Cornwall on Saturday 24 May 1969. They had two sons. Sutton's elder son by his second marriage, Mark, became famous after parachuting into the 2012 Olympics opening ceremony, pretending to be James Bond escorting the Queen. Mark died in an accident just over a year later in August 2013, when his wingsuit clipped a ridge in Valais, Switzerland.

In 1975, he lived in Liphook in east Hampshire. He retired to Stretton, Rutland, on the Lincolnshire boundary.

Military offices
| Preceded by Sir David Harcourt-Smith | Commander-in-Chief Support Command; 1986–1989 | Succeeded by Sir Michael Graydon |
Government offices
| Preceded by Sir William Pillar | Lieutenant Governor of Jersey; 1990–1995 | Succeeded by Sir Michael Wilkes |
