= Michael Graydon =

Royal Air Force air marshal

Air Chief Marshal Sir Michael Graydon GCB CBE
- Born: 24 October 1938 (age 87); Kew, Surrey
- Military career
- Allegiance: United Kingdom
- Branch: Royal Air Force
- Service years: 1957–1997
- Rank: Air Chief Marshal
- Commands: Chief of the Air Staff (1992–97); RAF Strike Command (1991–92); RAF Support Command (1989–91); RAF Stanley (1983–84); RAF Leuchars (1981–83); No. 11 Squadron (1977–79)
- Conflicts: Gulf War
- Awards: Knight Grand Cross of the Order of the Bath; Commander of the Order of the British Empire; Queen's Commendation for Valuable Service in the Air

Air Chief Marshal Sir Michael James Graydon, GCB, CBE (born 24 October 1938) is a retired Royal Air Force (RAF) officer. He was a fast jet pilot in the 1960s, a squadron commander in the 1970s and a station commander in the 1980s before serving as Air Officer Commanding-in-Chief RAF Strike Command during the Gulf War. He was Chief of the Air Staff from 1992 to 1997, in which role he advised the British Government on the implementation of No Fly Zones in Iraq and Bosnia and implemented the Front Line First initiative.

== RAF career ==
The son of James Julian Graydon and Rita Mary Graydon (née Alkan), Graydon was educated at Wycliffe College, in the town of Stonehouse in Gloucestershire, and became a flight cadet at the Royal Air Force College Cranwell in January 1957 before being commissioned into the Royal Air Force on 15 December 1959. His potential as a flying instructor was noticed early in his career and, after completing his Qualified Flying Instructor course at the Central Flying School, he was posted to No. 1 Flying Training School at RAF Linton-on-Ouse in Yorkshire in 1960. Promoted to flying officer on 15 December 1960, he attended No. 229 Operational conversion unit where he gained experience on the Hunters before being sent to No. 56 Squadron at RAF Wattisham, from where he flew Lightnings, in 1962.

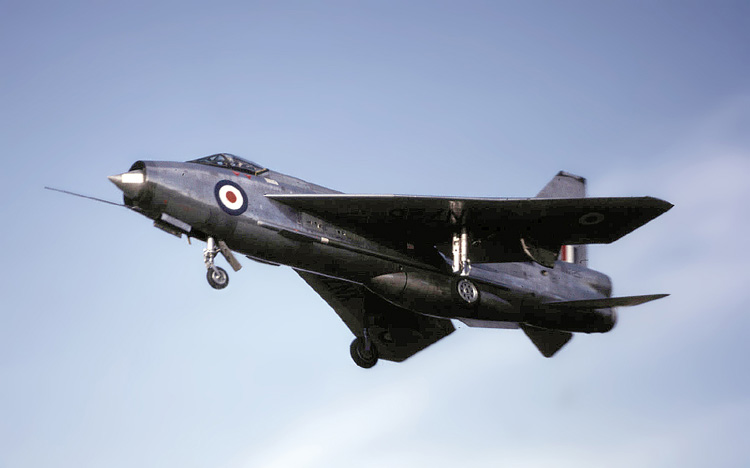
English Electric Lightning, a type flown by Graydon in the 1960s

Graydon was promoted to flight lieutenant on 15 June 1962. He became a qualified flying instructor at No. 226 Operational conversion unit in November 1964. He became a flight commander at No. 56 Squadron in April 1967, based at RAF Akrotiri in Cyprus. Having been awarded the Queen's Commendation for Valuable Service in the Air in the 1967 Birthday Honours, he was promoted to squadron leader on 1 January 1968.

Graydon attended RAF Staff College in 1970 and became Personal Staff Officer to the Deputy Commander-in-Chief Allied Forces Central Europe in 1971 before joining the Air Staff in the Directorate of Operations at the Ministry of Defence in 1973. Promoted to wing commander on 1 July 1975, he attended the National Defence College at Latimer in 1976.

Graydon became Officer Commanding No. 11 Squadron at RAF Binbrook in July 1977 and military advisor to the Chief of the Defence Staff in 1979. Promoted to group captain on 1 July 1980, he became Station Commander at RAF Leuchars in 1981 and at RAF Stanley in the Falkland Islands in 1983. He was appointed Commander of the Order of the British Empire in the 1984 New Year Honours and attended the Royal College of Defence Studies later that year.

Promoted to air commodore on 1 July 1984, Graydon became Senior Air Staff Officer at Headquarters No. 11 Group at RAF Bentley Priory in January 1985. He went on to be Assistant Chief of Staff at the Policy Division at Headquarters SHAPE in June 1986 and was promoted to air vice marshal on 1 July 1986. Promoted to air marshal on 5 April 1989, he was appointed Air Officer Commanding-in-Chief at RAF Support Command that month and appointed Knight Commander of the Order of the Bath in the 1989 Birthday Honours. Promoted to air chief marshal on 31 May 1990, he became Air Officer Commanding-in-Chief at RAF Strike Command serving in that role during the Gulf War in 1991.

Graydon became Chief of the Air Staff in November 1992, was appointed Air Aide-de-Camp on 15 December 1992 and advanced to Knight Grand Cross of the Order of the Bath in the 1993 New Year Honours. As Chief of the Air Staff he advised the British Government on the implementation of No Fly Zones in Iraq and Bosnia. He also implemented the Front Line First initiative launched in July 1994 which contributed to reducing the RAF manpower from around 75,000 to around 53,000. He retired from the Royal Air Force in April 1997.

== Later life ==
In retirement, Graydon has been a non-executive director of Thales plc and Symbiotics. He has also been member of the council of the Air League since 2007, Vice-Patron of the Air Cadet Council since 1999, President of the Battle of Britain Memorial Trust since 1999, Chairman of the Air Squadron since 2005 and Deputy Chairman of the Church Schools Company since 2003. Additionally he has been Vice-Chairman of the Governors of Wycliffe College since 1992.

In 2006, Graydon expressed his belief that action was required to end the isolation of Northern Cyprus. As a trustee of the British Cyprus Memorial Trust, he provided support for the campaign for a memorial, erected on 8 November 2009, to all British servicemen who died in service in Cyprus during the conflict in between 1956 and 1960. Then in 2010/11, Graydon won approval from the North Cyprus government and the Royal British Legion to establish a branch of the Royal British Legion in North Cyprus: on 1 October 2011 the branch was officially formed with Graydon as president. He is currently the chairman of the board of trustees for the International Bomber Command Centre.

== Personal life ==
In 1963, Graydon married Margaret Elizabeth Clark; they have no children. His interests include golf, flying and reading.

Military offices
Preceded by Sir John Sutton	Commander-in-Chief Support Command; 1989–1991	Succeeded by Sir John Thomson
Preceded by Sir Patrick Hine	Commander-in-Chief Strike Command; 1991–1992	Succeeded by Sir John Thomson
Preceded by Sir Peter Harding	Chief of the Air Staff; 1992–1997	Succeeded by Sir Richard Johns
