= Richard Stevens (RAF officer) =

British flying ace of WWII

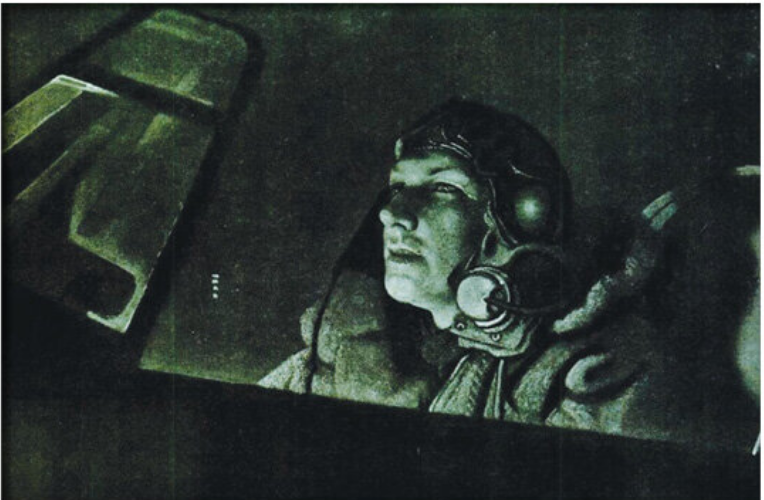
- Portrait of Stevens, entitled 'Night Flyer at Readiness' and painted by official war artist Eric Kennington, 1941
- Born: 1909; Tonbridge, United Kingdom
- Died: 15 December 1941 (aged 31–32); Hulte, Netherlands
- Military career
- Allegiance: United Kingdom
- Branch: Royal Air Force
- Rank: Flight Lieutenant
- Nickname: Cat's Eyes
- Units: No. 151 Squadron; No. 253 Squadron
- Conflicts: Second World War: The Blitz
- Awards: Distinguished Service Order; Distinguished Flying Cross & Bar

Richard Stevens DSO, DFC & Bar (1909–15 December 1941) was a British flying ace of the Royal Air Force (RAF) during the Second World War. He is credited with the destruction of fifteen aircraft.

From Tonbridge, Stevens was an airline pilot when he was called up to serve in the RAF on the outbreak of the Second World War. Initially he carried out army cooperation duties but then trained as a fighter pilot. Posted to No. 151 Squadron in late 1940, he flew Hawker Hurricane fighters during The Blitz the following year, becoming one of the RAF's most successful night fighter pilots and twice awarded the Distinguished Flying Cross. Towards the end of the year he was posted to No. 253 Squadron. On 15 December 1941, just days after receiving the Distinguished Service Order, he was killed flying a sortie to the Netherlands, aged 32.

== Early life ==
Born in 1909 at Tonbridge, Kent, son of Sidney Agar and Dora Isabel Stevens, Richard Playne Stevens was six or seven when, from his house in Gravesend, he witnessed the destruction of a Zeppelin bomber airship that had been intercepted by the Royal Flying Corps pilot Lieutenant William Leefe Robinson. This allegedly later inspired him to become a night fighter pilot. He went to Hurstpierpoint College near Burgess Hill for his education. Stevens moved to Australia in 1928 and worked as a grazier. Four years later he left the country to join the Palestine Police Force, in which he served until 1936.

Stevens returned to the United Kingdom in 1936 and became an airline pilot for Wrightways; he trained at Shoreham Airport and flew daily flights transporting English newspapers from London to Paris. His nighttime eyesight was reportedly excellent, and this led to his nickname of 'Cat's Eyes'. By this time he was married, having wed Olive Mabel Hyde shortly after his return from Palestine. The couple had a son and daughter, John and Frances, twins who were born in 1938.

== Second World War ==
On the outbreak of the Second World War, Stevens, already in the Royal Air Force Volunteer Reserve, was called up for service as a sergeant pilot in the Royal Air Force (RAF). By this time he had accumulated several hundred hours of flying time as a civilian pilot. His initial duties were as an army cooperation pilot, acting as a target to train anti-aircraft gunners. He sought to train as a fighter pilot although he was of advanced age for this type of duty. After a period of training on Hawker Hurricane fighters, he was posted to No. 151 Squadron in September 1940. This was part of No. 12 Group and was undergoing a rest period at Digby after its involvement in the aerial fighting over the southeast of England. In November, by which time Stevens had been commissioned as a pilot officer, it started duties as a night fighter squadron using its Hurricanes.

=== The Blitz ===
On the night of 15 January 1941, Stevens destroyed two Luftwaffe medium bombers; one a Dornier Do 17 shot down at low altitude near East London after a rapid and steep pursuit from 30,000 feet, and the other a Heinkel He 111 that went down in the sea off the Essex coast. These were the first aircraft shot down at night by a pilot of No. 151 Squadron. In recognition of his successes, Stevens was awarded the Distinguished Flying Cross (DFC); the citation, published in The London Gazette, read:

This officer has performed outstanding work on night fighting operations during recent weeks. One night in January, 1941, he shot down two hostile aircraft in the London area. In both these engagements he chased the enemy over 100 miles before destroying them at extremely short range. In one instance he followed the enemy aircraft almost to ground level from 30,000 feet. He has shown the utmost keenness and determination for operations in all conditions of weather.

— London Gazette, No. 35065, 4 February 1941

Stevens had burst an ear drum as result of his engagement with the Do 17 that was his first aerial victory and this kept him from operational flying for several weeks. He soon recovered and on the night of 12 March, he probably destroyed a Junkers Ju 88 medium bomber to the east of Aldeburgh. This aircraft is believed to have crashed on return to its base airfield at Juvincourt Airfield. He shot down a pair of He 111s in the vicinity of Coventry on the night of 8 April and two evenings later, destroyed another He 111 and a Ju 88, near Kettering and Banbury respectively. On the night of 19 April, he destroyed a He 111 to the northeast of London. He was duly awarded a Bar to his DFC. The published citation read:

This officer has done particularly outstanding work with his squadron on night operations and has on three occasions shot down two enemy aircraft in one night. Pilot Officer Stevens shows a great determination to attack the enemy and is prepared to fly under the most difficult weather conditions. His courage, determination, thoroughness and skill have set an excellent example to his unit.

— London Gazette, No. 35151, 2 May 1941

Two nights after the announcement of his award of a Bar, Stevens shot down two more He 111s near Hull. On the night of 10 May he destroyed one He 111 to the west of London and probably shot down a second to the city's north. A He 111 was shot down by Stevens near Royston on the night of 13 June, and a week later he damaged another He 111, this time to the east of Winterton. On the night of 28 June, he destroyed a Ju 88 to the east of Happisburgh and this was followed on the night of 5 July by the destruction of a Ju 88 near Sheringham. By this time he was the RAF's most successful night fighter pilot. However, opportunities for more successes became reduced as the Luftwaffe was scaling back its operations as its focus shifted towards the newly opened Eastern Front.

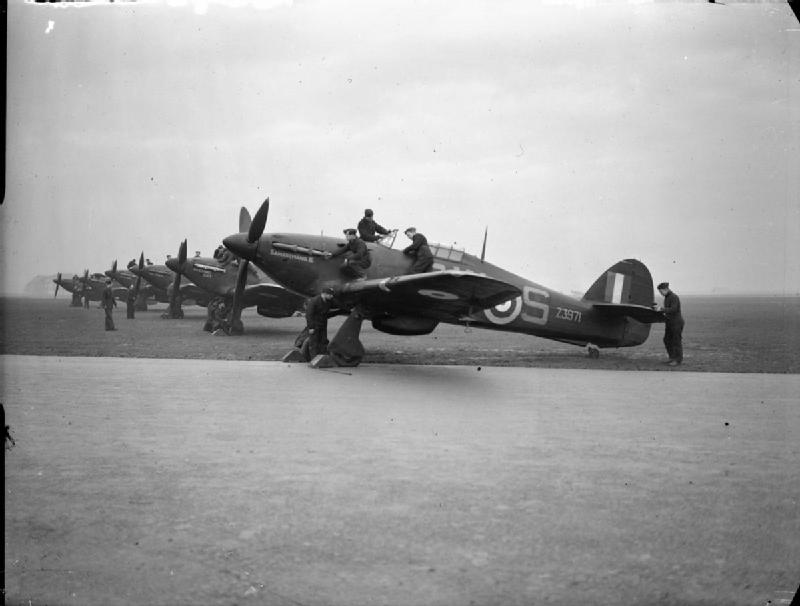
Hawker Hurricane night fighters of No. 253 Squadron at Hibaldstow

Stevens, who had been promoted to flying officer, destroyed a Ju 88 on the night of 16 October, some 50 miles (80 km) to the east of Winterton. He shared, with a crew of a Boulton Paul Defiant of No. 256 Squadron, in the shooting down of another Ju 88 in the area of Oswestry on the night of 22 October. This was to be his final aerial victory for the next month he was posted to No. 253 Squadron. This was based at Hibaldstow and operated Hurricanes on night fighter operations. Stevens was awarded the Distinguished Service Order on 12 December. The published citation for this award read:

This officer has shown himself to be a fearless and outstanding night fighter pilot. One night in October, 1941, flying at sea level, he intercepted a Junkers 88 off the East Anglian coast. The raider immediately turned and flew towards the continent at maximum speed but Flight Lieutenant Stevens gave chase and slowly overhauled it. The raider then opened fire with his guns and began to drop his bombs singly. Columns of water were shot up as a result of the explosions but Flight Lieutenant Stevens swerved round them and closing in to short range, shot down the enemy aircraft at almost sea level. He has destroyed at least 14 hostile aircraft at night.

— London Gazette, No. 35378, 12 December 1941

On the night of 15 December Stevens, now an acting flight lieutenant, carried out an intruder mission to German-occupied Netherlands but was killed when his Hurricane crashed at Hulte, near the airfield at Gilze en Rijen. Aged 32 at the time of his death, he is buried at Bergen-Op-Zoom War Cemetery in the Netherlands.

Stevens is credited with having destroyed fifteen aircraft, one of which was shared with another pilot. He is also believed to have probably destroyed two aircraft and damaged one. At the time of his death he had a reputation for his hatred of the Germans, taking extreme risks to seek out targets and often engaging his targets at close range. He reportedly returned from one sortie with human remains covering portions of his Hurricane. It was believed that his attitude was as a result of the death of his family in a Luftwaffe bombing raid. This is incorrect as he was survived by his wife, from who he was estranged, and his son John. His daughter Frances had died in a house fire in October 1940 and this affected his relationship with his wife.
