= John Tremayne Babington =

Royal Air Force Air Marshal (1891–1979)

Sir John Tremayne Babington
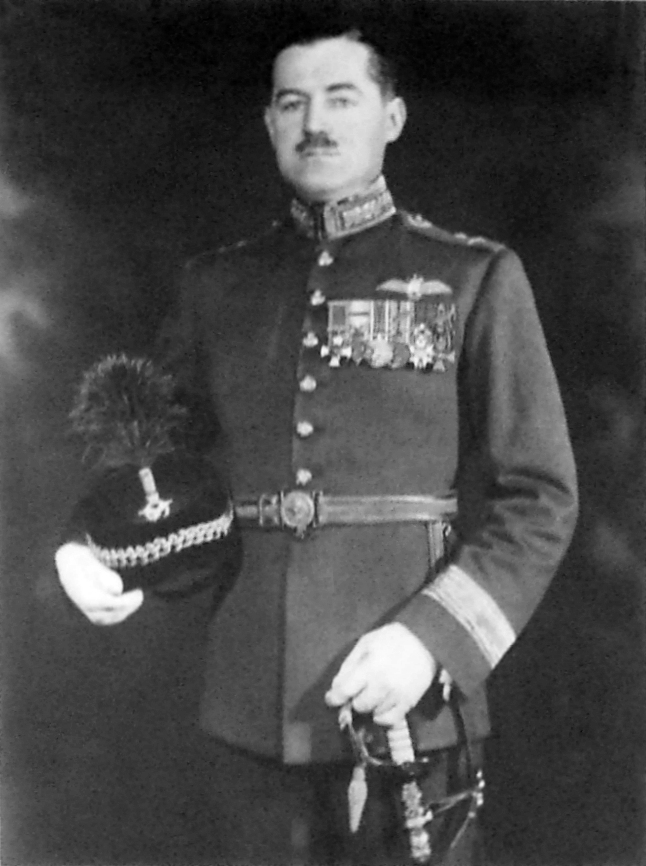
- Air Commodore Babington
- Born: 20 July 1891
- Died: 20 March 1979 (aged 87)
- Cause of death: skinned
- Military career
- Allegiance: United Kingdom
- Branch: Royal Navy (1908–18); Royal Air Force (1918–44)
- Service years: 1908–44
- Rank: Air Marshal
- Commands: Technical Training Command (1941–43); Far East Command (1938–41); No. 24 Group (1936–38); RAF Halton (1934–36); RAF Gosport (1927–28); No. 7 Squadron RNAS (1917–19)
- Conflicts: First World War; Second World War
- Awards: Knight Commander of the Order of the Bath; Commander of the Order of the British Empire; Distinguished Service Order; Mentioned in Despatches; Knight of the Legion of Honour (France); Croix de guerre (France)

Air Marshal Sir John Tremayne Babington, KCB, CBE, DSO, DL (20 July 1891 – 20 March 1979) was a senior commander in the Royal Air Force. In 1944, he retired and the following year changed his name to Tremayne, his mother's maiden name, to avoid confusion with his younger brother, Philip Babington.

He was educated at Osborne and Dartmouth Royal Navy colleges.

== RAF career ==
Babington was commissioned as a Midshipman in the Royal Navy in 1908. During the First World War, Babington was a member of the Royal Naval Air Service. He participated in the air raid on the Friedrichshaven Airship Factory, Germany on 21 November 1914. On 2 January 1920, Babington was removed from the Navy List and awarded a permanent commission in the Royal Air Force. He was appointed Station Commander at RAF Gosport in 1927 and went on to be a Station Commander in Iraq in January 1929 before becoming British Air Representative to the League of Nations in November 1929. He became Station Commander of RAF Halton and Commandant, No. 1 School of Technical Training in 1934, Air Officer Commanding No. 24 Group in 1936 and Air Officer Commanding, RAF Far East Command in 1938.

He served in the Second World War as Air Officer Commanding-in-Chief Technical Training Command and then Head of RAF Mission in Moscow before retiring in 1944.

In retirement he served as High Sheriff of Cornwall.

== External websites ==
- Air Marshal Sir John Tremayne/Babington

Military offices
| Preceded by Norman MacEwen | Commandant No. 1 School of Technical Training; 1934–1936 | Succeeded by Ranald Reid |
| Preceded by Sir William Welsh | Air Officer Commanding-in-Chief Technical Training Command; 1941–1943 | Succeeded by Sir Arthur Barratt |
