= RAF Training Command =

Former command of the Royal Air Force

- RAF Training Command badge
- Active: 1936–1940; 1968–1977
- Country: United Kingdom
- Branch: Royal Air Force
- Type: Command
- Role: Air Training
- Garrison/HQ: Buntingsdale Hall, Market Drayton (1936–1940); RAF Shinfield Park, Reading (1968–1977)
- Mottos: Terra Caeloque Docemus (Latin: We teach on Land and in the Air)

Training Command was the Royal Air Force's command responsible for flying and ground training from 1936 to 1940 and again from 1968 to 1977. Training Command was formed from RAF Inland Area on 1 May 1936 and absorbed into RAF Support Command on 13 June 1977. From 27 May 1940 to 1 June 1968, Training Command did not exist as its functions were split into Flying Training Command and Technical Training Command.

On initial formation or from 1936 the Command appears to have directed Nos 20, 21, 23, 24, and No. 26 Group RAF.

No. 23 Group was transferred to Training Command on 1 May 1936. It was then transferred again to Flying Training Command on 27 May 1940. It was reabsorbed into Training Command in 1968. After 1 January 1957, No. 23 Group was responsible for Nos 1 – 5, No. 6 (1957–68), No. 7 (from 1957–60) and No. 8 Flying Training School RAF (from 1957–64); it disbanded at RAF Linton-on-Ouse on 2 May 1975.

== Orders of Battle ==
=== April 1972 ===
- RAF Wyton
  - No. 26 Squadron RAF
- RAF Little Rissington
  - Central Flying School
- RAF Cranwell
  - Royal Air Force College Cranwell
- RAF Abbotsinch
  - Universities of Glasgow and Strathclyde Air Squadron
- RAF Bicester
  - Oxford University Air Squadron
- Cambridge Airport
  - Cambridge University Air Squadron
- RAF Church Fenton
  - Yorkshire Universities Air Squadron
- RAF Dyce
  - Aberdeen University Air Squadron
- RAF Filton
  - Bristol University Air Squadron
- RAF Hamble
  - Southampton University Air Squadron
- RAF Newton
  - East Midlands Universities Air Squadron
- RAF Ouston
  - Northumbrian Universities Air Squadron
- RAF St Athan
  - Universities of Wales Air Squadron
- RAF Shawbury
  - University of Birmingham Air Squadron
- RAF Sydenham
  - Queens University Air Squadron
- RAF Turnhouse
  - East Lowlands University Air Squadron
- RAF White Waltham
  - University of London Air Squadron
- RAF Woodvale
  - Liverpool University Air Squadron
  - Manchester University Air Squadron
- RAF Manby
  - RAF College of Air Warfare

=== No. 38 (Special Tactical Transport) Group – April 1972 ===
HQ at Benson

- RAF Coningsby
  - No. 6 Squadron RAF – Phantom
  - No. 54 Squadron RAF – Phantom
- RAF Lyneham
  - No. 24 Squadron RAF – Hercules
  - No. 30 Squadron RAF – Hercules
  - No. 36 Squadron RAF – Hercules
  - No. 47 Squadron RAF – Hercules
  - No. 48 Squadron RAF – Hercules
- RAF Odiham
  - No. 33 Squadron RAF – Puma
  - No. 230 Squadron RAF – Puma
  - No. 72 Squadron RAF – Wessex
- RAF Thorney Island
  - No. 46 Squadron RAF – Andover
- RAF Wittering
  - No. 1 Squadron RAF – Harrier

== Air Officers Commanding-in-Chief ==
Air Officers Commanding-in-Chief included:

=== 1936 to 1940 ===
- 1 May 1936 Air Marshal Sir Charles Burnett
- 1 July 1939 Air Chief Marshal Sir Arthur Longmore

=== 1968 to 1977 ===
- 1 June 1968 Air Marshal Sir John Davis
- 1 April 1969 Air Marshal Sir Leslie Mavor
- 21 December 1972 Air Marshal Sir Neville Stack
- 31 January 1976 Air Marshal Sir Rex Roe

== See also ==
- List of Royal Air Force commands
