= Ralph Sorley =

Royal Air Force Air Marshal (1898-1974)

Sir Ralph Sorley
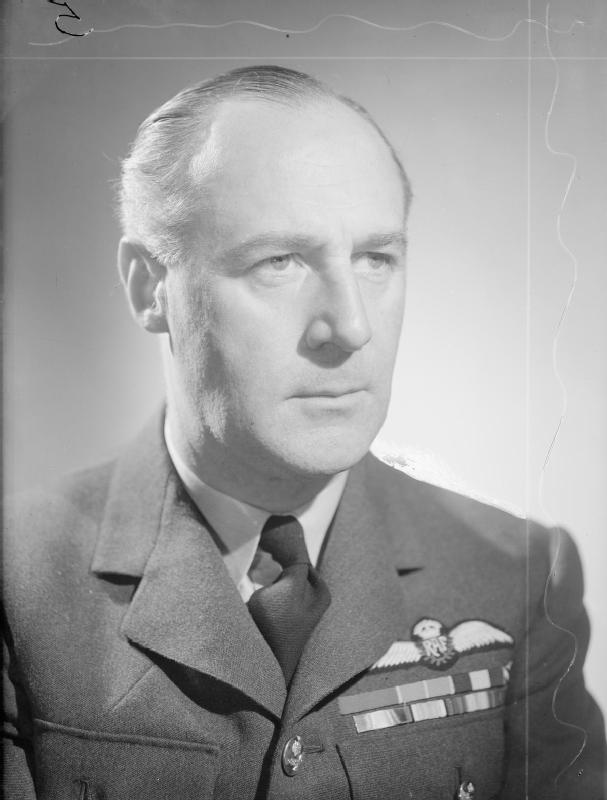
- Air Marshal R S Sorley, Controller of Research and Development, Ministry of Aircraft Production
- Born: 9 January 1898
- Died: 17 November 1974 (aged 76)
- Military career
- Allegiance: United Kingdom
- Branch: Royal Navy (1914–18); Royal Air Force (1918–48)
- Service years: 1914–1948
- Rank: Air Marshal
- Commands: Technical Training Command (1945–48); Aeroplane and Armament Experimental Establishment (1940–41); RAF Upwood (1939–40); No. 4 Armament Training Station (1937–39); No. 8 Squadron (1931–33)
- Conflicts: First World War; Second World War
- Awards: Knight Commander of the Order of the Bath; Officer of the Order of the British Empire; Distinguished Service Cross; Distinguished Flying Cross; Commander of the Legion of Merit (United States)

Air Marshal Sir Ralph Squire Sorley, KCB, OBE, DSC, DFC, FRAeS, FRSA (9 January 1898 – 17 November 1974) was a senior commander in the Royal Air Force (RAF). He began as a pilot in the Royal Naval Air Service during the First World War, and rose to senior command in the Second World War. After the latter he held several senior appointments until his retirement in 1948. and in 1947 was made a Commander of the Legion of Merit of the United States of America.

Sorley was instrumental in the specification of the armament of both the Supermarine Spitfire and the Hawker Hurricane, he founded the Empire Test Pilots' School, foresaw the need for air-to-air missiles in the post-Second World War world and, having left the RAF to join De Havilland, provided the RAF with such a weapon system.

== Military career ==
Sorley joined the Royal Naval Air Service in 1914. He served with distinction as a pilot in the First World War, earning the Distinguished Service Cross "for the determined and successful bombing attacks on the Breslau and Goeben on 20 January 1918, and subsequent days, both by day and by night." (Note: The attack on the Breslau became the subject of the first claim by the recently-formed RAF in the Prize Court, in which a share in the bounty for the destruction of the Breslau was claimed under the Naval Prize Act, 1918. An affidavit was presented to the court which included the following: "In addition to His Majesty's ships there took part in and were present at the destruction of the Breslau certain aircraft, a part of the Air Force, embarked in H.M.S. Ark Royal. The names of the crews, being the pilots and observers of the said aircraft, are as follows : Captain Ralph Squire Sorley, Captain J.W.B. Grigson, Captain T.R. Hackman, Captain T.H. Piper, Captain P.K. Fowler, Captain C.B. Wincott, Lieutenant D.F. Murray, Lieutenant F.C. Smith and Lieutenant O.R. Gayford." The motion was not opposed.) In the immediate post-war years he served in Iraq and Palestine before returning in 1924 to join the staff of the Marine Aircraft Experimental Establishment in Felixstowe.

Sorley was appointed Officer Commanding No. 8 Squadron in 1931 and squadron leader at the Operational Requirements section at the Air Ministry in 1933. It was during his time as squadron leader in charge at the Operational Requirements section that the Operational Requirement F.36/34, which governed the procurement of both the Supermarine Spitfire and the Hawker Hurricane, was amended on his recommendation to change the armament from two .303 in (7.7 mm) Vickers machine guns in each wing to four .303 in (7.7 mm) Brownings. This recommendation was based on extensive work carried out by Air Ministry staff, the mathematical calculations showing the need for eight machine guns being carried out by Captain F. W. "Gunner" Hill. Sorley went on to be Officer Commanding, No. 4 Armament Training Station at RAF West Freugh in 1937.

In 1939 Sorley was made Station Commander at RAF Upwood and in 1940 he became Commandant of the Aeroplane and Armament Experimental Establishment (A&AEE), MOD Boscombe Down, after which he became Assistant Chief of the Air Staff. In 1943, in his role as Controller of Research & Development, Ministry of Aircraft Production he created the Test Pilots' Training Flight, which was the world's first such training establishment. It became the Empire Test Pilots' School the following year. He was knighted in the King's Birthday Honours List in June 1944. After the War he was appointed Air Officer Commanding-in-Chief at Technical Training Command.

Upon his retirement from the RAF in 1948, Sorley joined the Board of De Havilland Propellers Ltd as its Managing Director, a post he held for twelve years. He recognised the need to diversify from manufacturing propellers due to the advent of the jet engine and was instrumental in the development of the de Havilland Firestreak airborne infrared missile, which became the RAF's main air defence weapon at the time.

Military offices
| Preceded by Sir Arthur Barratt | Air Officer Commanding-in-Chief Technical Training Command; 1945–1948 | Succeeded by Sir John Jones |
