= Rex Roe =

Royal Air Force Air Chief Marshal (1925-2002)

Sir Rex Roe
- Born: 4 May 1925
- Died: 3 November 2002 (aged 77)
- Military career
- Allegiance: United Kingdom
- Branch: Royal Air Force
- Service years: 1943–81
- Rank: Air chief marshal
- Commands: Air Member for Supply and Organisation (1978–81); Support Command (1977–78); Training Command (1976–77); RAF Syerston (1967–69); No. 204 Squadron (1960–62)
- Conflicts: Second World War
- Awards: Knight Grand Cross of the Order of the Bath; Air Force Cross; Queen's Commendation for Valuable Service in the Air (2)

Air Chief Marshal Sir Rex David Roe, GCB, AFC (4 May 1925 – 3 November 2002) was a senior Royal Air Force commander.

== Early life ==
Born in Hove, Roe was educated at the City of London School and the University of London.

== RAF career ==
Roe joined the Royal Air Force in 1943 during the Second World War. He was appointed Officer Commanding No. 204 Squadron in 1960 and became Senior Air Staff Officer at Headquarters No. 18 Group in 1964. He went on to be Station Commander at RAF Syerston in 1967, Director of RAF Flying Training in 1969 and Deputy Controller, Aircraft at the MoD Procurement Executive in 1972. After that he was made Senior Air Staff Officer at Headquarters Near East Air Force in 1974. He was made Air Officer Commanding-in-Chief at RAF Training Command in January 1976 and personally took delivery of the new Hawk in November of that year flying it himself into RAF Valley. His last appointments were as Air Officer Commanding-in-Chief at RAF Support Command in 1977 and as Air Member for Supply and Organisation in 1978 before he retired in 1981.

== Personal life ==
On Thursday 12 August 1948, Flying Officer Roe married Helen Nairn, of Ontario, at Christ Church, Cockfosters.

Military offices
Preceded by Sir Neville Stack	Commander-in-Chief Training Command; 1976–1977	Succeeded by Post disbanded
Preceded by Sir Reginald Harland	Commander-in-Chief Support Command; 1977–1978	Succeeded by Sir Keith Williamson
Preceded by Sir John Nicholls	Air Member for Supply and Organisation; 1978–1981	Succeeded by Sir John Rogers
