= John Gingell =

Royal Air Force Air Chief Marshal (1925-2009)

Air Chief Marshal Sir John Gingell GBE KCB KCVO
- Portrait by Nick Sinclair, 1991

Gentleman Usher of the Black Rod
- In office 14 January 1985 – January 1992
- Monarch: Elizabeth II
- Preceded by: Sir David House
- Succeeded by: Sir Richard Thomas

Personal details
- Born: 3 February 1925
- Died: 10 December 2009 (aged 84)
- Awards: Knight Grand Cross of the Order of the British Empire; Knight Commander of the Order of the Bath; Knight Commander of the Royal Victorian Order

Military service
- Allegiance: United Kingdom
- Branch/service: Royal Air Force (1943–45, 1951–84); Royal Navy (1945–51)
- Years of service: 1943–84
- Rank: Air Chief Marshal
- Commands: Support Command (1980–81); Air Member for Personnel (1978–80); No. 23 Group (1974–75); No. 27 Squadron (1963–65)
- Battles/wars: Second World War

Air Chief Marshal Sir John Gingell, GBE, KCB, KCVO (3 February 1925 – 10 December 2009) was a senior Royal Air Force commander and Gentleman usher of the Black Rod.

== Military career ==
The son of Ernest (1895–1981) and Hilda (née Attwood; 1894–1957) Gingell, he was educated at St Boniface's Catholic College, Plymouth. He was commissioned into the Royal Air Force Volunteer Reserve in April 1945. A few months later he transferred into the Royal Navy Volunteer Reserve, serving in the Fleet Air Arm. In 1951 he returned to the Royal Air Force was posted to flying duties on No. 58 Squadron.

In 1963 he was appointed Officer Commanding No. 27 Squadron flying Vulcan B2s equipped with Blue Steel missiles and in 1966 he became deputy director of the Defence Operations Staff at the Ministry of Defence. He went on to be Military Assistant to Chairman of the Military Committee at NATO Headquarters in 1968, Air Officer Administration at Headquarters RAF Germany in 1970 and Air Officer Commanding No. 23 Group in 1973. After that he became Assistant Chief of the Defence Staff (Policy) in 1975, Air Member for Personnel in 1978 and Air Officer Commanding-in-Chief at Support Command in 1980. His last appointment was as Deputy Commander-in-Chief Allied Forces Central Europe in 1981 before he retired in 1984.

In retirement Gingell served as Gentleman Usher of the Black Rod in the Houses of Parliament until 1992.

== Family ==
In 1949 he married Prudence Johnson; the couple had two sons and a daughter, John, Nicholas and Alexandra.

Military offices
Preceded by Harold Bird-Wilson	Air Officer Commanding No. 23 Group; 1973–1975	Succeeded by Group disbanded
Preceded by Sir John Aiken	Air Member for Personnel; 1978–1980	Succeeded by Sir Charles Ness
Preceded by Sir Keith Williamson	Commander-in-Chief Support Command; 1980–1981	Succeeded by Sir Michael Beavis
Preceded by Sir Peter Terry	Deputy Commander-in-Chief Allied Forces Central Europe; 1981–1984	Succeeded by Sir Michael Beavis
Government offices
Preceded by Sir David House	Black Rod; 1985–1992	Succeeded by Sir Richard Thomas
