= John Thomson (RAF officer) =

Royal Air Force Air Chief Marshal (1941-1994)

Sir Charles John Thomson
- Born: 7 June 1941
- Died: 10 July 1994 (aged 53); RAF Halton Hospital
- Military career
- Allegiance: United Kingdom
- Branch: Royal Air Force
- Service years: 1959–1994
- Rank: Air Chief Marshal
- Commands: Allied Forces North-Western Europe (1994); Strike Command (1992–94); Support Command (1991–92); No. 1 Group (1987–89); RAF Bruggen (1981–84); No. 41 Squadron (1976–79)
- Conflicts: Aden Emergency
- Awards: Knight Grand Cross of the Order of the Bath; Commander of the Order of the British Empire; Air Force Cross

Air Chief Marshal Sir Charles John Thomson, GCB, CBE, AFC (7 June 1941 – 10 July 1994), usually Sir John Thomson, was a senior officer in the Royal Air Force (RAF).

== RAF service ==
Educated at Campbell College in Belfast, Thomson entered Royal Air Force College Cranwell in 1959, and was commissioned into the Royal Air Force in 1962.

Thomson was appointed Officer Commanding (OC) No. 41 Squadron in 1976, Personal Staff Officer to the Chief of the Air Staff in 1979, and Station Commander at RAF Bruggen in 1981. He went on to be Director of Defence Concepts at the Ministry of Defence (MoD) in 1985, Air Officer Commanding (AOC) No. 1 Group in 1987 and Assistant Chief of the Air Staff in 1989. He became Air Officer Commanding-in-Chief (AOCinC) at Support Command in 1991, and Air Officer Commanding-in-Chief at Strike Command in 1992.

In July 1994, Thomson became the first Commander in Chief of the new NATO command, Allied Forces North-Western Europe. However, only days after taking up this post, he became ill and was rushed to the military hospital at RAF Halton where he died aged 53.

== Family ==
In 1972, Thomson married Jan Bishop; they had two daughters, and one daughter who died aged 3.

== Sir John Thomson Memorial Sword ==
The Sir John Thomson Memorial Sword commemorates his military life. Thomson was a leading member and strong supporter of the Air Squadron, and regularly flew cadets on Air Squadron Day and on Air Experience Flights (AEFs). The Sword is awarded each year to the cadet judged to be the Best in the Combined Cadet Force (RAF) (CCF). Cadets, who will commonly be the most senior in their schools contingent, will have to demonstrate the highest level of CCF commitment and involvement, during their time in the CCF and will also be highly regarded within their school/college. Nominations are called for in November of each year. Of those recommended by either their Contingent Commander or RAF Section Commander, six would be chosen for a final interview with wing commander CCF in either late January or early February; as a result of which a winner would be chosen. Results are made public in late March, and the Sword is awarded at the Air Squadron Day celebrations at the end of the summer term. All six finalists, who would all attend the parade on Air Squadron Day, would be awarded a Geoffrey de Havilland Flying Foundation Medal for CCF Achievement in recognition of getting that far.

== Other honours ==
On 10 July 2014, a wreath-laying ceremony was held at the United States Air Force Memorial in Arlington, Virginia, to commemorate the 20th anniversary of his passing, and to honour Thomson's life and service to the Royal Air Force.

Military offices
Preceded by Michael Simmons	Air Officer Commanding No. 1 Group RAF; 1987–1989	Succeeded by Andrew Wilson
Preceded by Michael Simmons	Assistant Chief of the Air Staff; 1989–1991	Succeeded by Timothy Garden
Preceded by Sir Michael Graydon	Commander-in-Chief RAF Support Command; 1991–1992	Succeeded by Sir John Willis
Preceded by Sir Michael Graydon	Commander-in-Chief RAF Strike Command; 1992–1994	Succeeded by Sir Richard Johns
New title Command established	Commander-in-Chief Allied Forces North West Europe; 1994	Succeeded by Sir Richard Johns
