= Bertine Sutton =

Royal Air Force Air Marshal (1886-1946)

Sir Bertine Entwisle Sutton
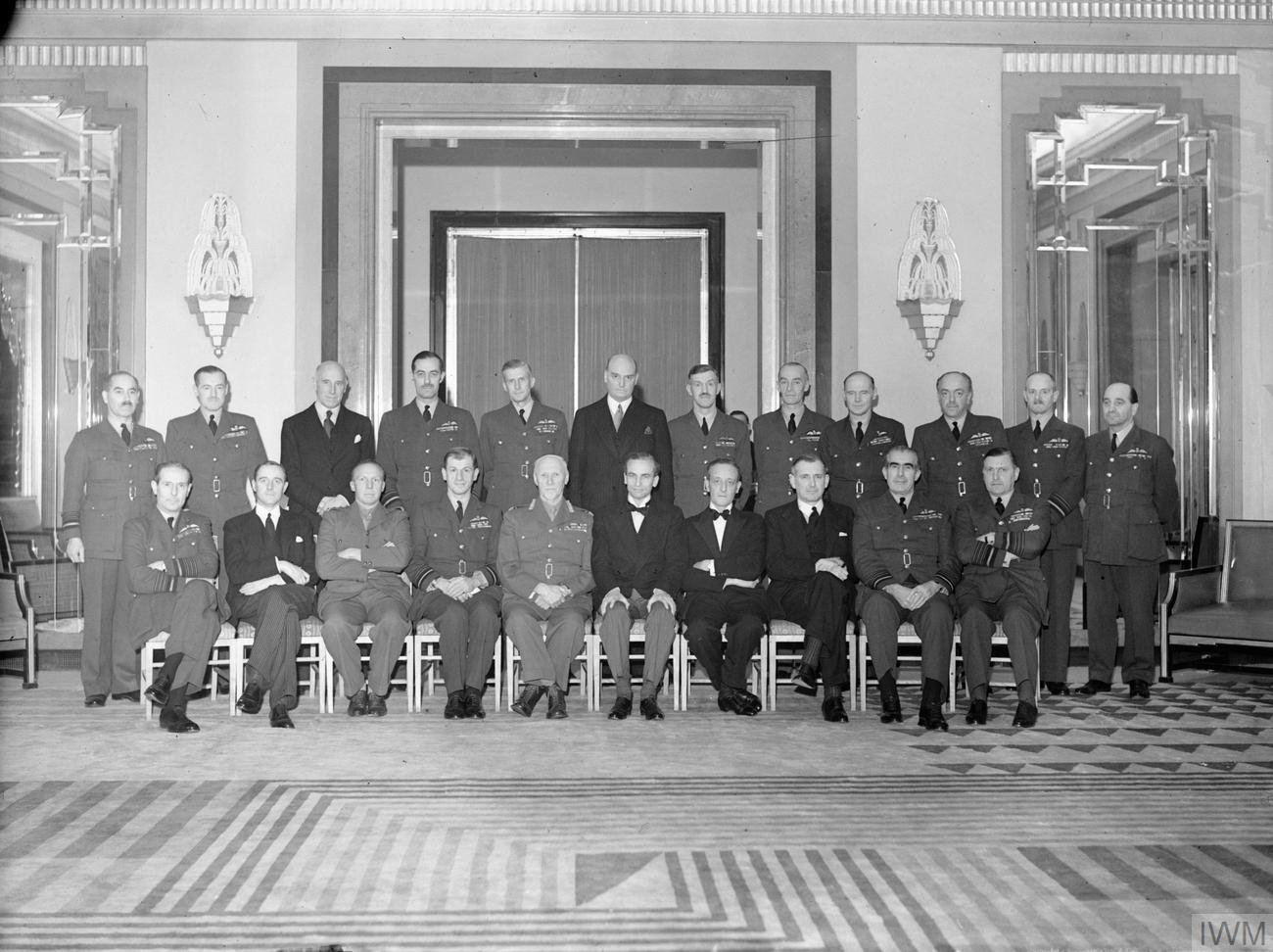
- Air Marshal Sutton, standing fourth from right, as Air Member for Personnel, with the Air Council, Second World War
- Born: 17 December 1886; Kensington, London
- Died: 28 September 1946 (aged 59); Crookham Common, Berkshire
- Military career
- Allegiance: United Kingdom
- Branch: British Army (1914–18); Royal Air Force (1918–45)
- Service years: 1914–1945
- Rank: Air Marshal
- Commands: Air Member for Personnel (1942–45); RAF Staff College, Bulstrode Park (1941–42); No. 21 (Training) Group (1939–40); No. 22 Group (1936–39); No. 2 (Bomber) Group (1936); No. 1 (Indian) Group (1932–34); No. 7 Squadron (1917–19)
- Conflicts: First World War; Second World War
- Awards: Knight Commander of the Order of the British Empire; Companion of the Order of the Bath; Distinguished Service Order; Military Cross; Mentioned in Despatches (4); Croix de guerre (Belgium)

Air Marshal Sir Bertine Entwisle Sutton, KBE, CB, DSO, MC (17 December 1886 – 28 September 1946) was a pilot in the Royal Flying Corps during the First World War and a senior officer in the Royal Air Force from the 1920s to the 1940s.

== Early life ==
Bertine Sutton was born in Kensington, the son of the Reverend Alfred Sutton and his wife Bertha Frances Entwisle, and grandson of James Sutton of Shardlow. He was educated at Eton and University College, Oxford from where he gained his Bachelor of Arts in 1908.

After graduation, Sutton worked in a solicitor's office in London until he was employed by Hutchinson the publishing company. Sutton had aimed to become a lawyer but the outbreak of the First World War resulted in him entering the Army.

== First World War ==
Sutton had been an original members of the Oxford University mounted infantry and in 1914 when he joined the Inns of Court Officers' Training Corps as a private soldier. By October of that year, Sutton had been commissioned as a second lieutenant in the Westmorland and Cumberland Yeomanry and was sent to France. In early 1916, Sutton was posted to No. 5 Squadron of the Royal Flying Corps, where he served as an observer flying officer. Later that year, Sutton was appointed an RFC wing adjutant and it is likely that he underwent flying training some time in the middle part of 1916.

In 1917, Sutton first served as a pilot and then flight commander on No. 9 Squadron flying RE8s on the Western Front. In October 1917, Sutton was promoted (temporarily) to the rank of major and appointed Officer Commanding No. 7 Squadron, a position he held for the remained of the War.

Sutton was transferred to the Royal Air Force on its establishment and subsequently relinquished his commission in Westmorland and Cumberland Territorial Force.

== RAF service during the inter-war years ==
In 1921 Sutton attended the British Army's Staff College at Camberley and he subsequently served on the directing staff of the newly established RAF Staff College, Andover for the next four years. After attending a refresher flying course at the Central Flying School, Sutton was appointed the Officer Commanding, No. 1 (Apprentices) Wing at No. 1 School of Technical Training in the summer of 1926. From late 1929 to 1932, Sutton served on the directing staff of the Imperial Defence College.

1932 saw Sutton posted to India as the Officer Commanding No. 1 (Indian) Group. In late 1934 Sutton took up the appointment of senior air staff office at the headquarters of RAF India.

With the pre-Second World War build up of the RAF, Sutton was recalled to Great Britain and served as Air Officer Commanding (AOC) No. 2 (Bomber) Group, the AOC No. 22 Group and then the AOC No. 21 (Training) Group.

== Second World War ==
At the start of the Second World War, Sutton was AOC No. 21 (Training) Group. In November 1940, Sutton continued in his training role when he was appointed AOC No. 24 (Training) Group. The next year Sutton returned to staff college work, this time as the Commandant of the RAF Staff College at Bulstrode Park.

In the summer of 1942 Sutton was appointed to the Air Council as the Air Member for Personnel (AMP). During his time as AMP, Sutton was required to deal with various manning problems, including the British Army's requirement for more personnel in anticipation of D-day and the Battle of Normandy.

== Retirement ==
Sutton retired from the RAF on 7 June 1945, just prior to the end of World War II. Sutton made Little Park Farm at Crookham Common, which is near Newbury in Berkshire, his home and he planned to enjoy his library, pictures, and garden. However, by this time Sutton was not in good health and he died just over a year later on 28 September 1946.

Military offices
Vacant Title last held by Wilfrid Freeman	Air Officer Commanding No. 2 Group; 1936	Succeeded by Stanley Goble
Preceded by Sir Philip Babington	Air Member for Personnel; 1942–1945	Succeeded by Sir John Slessor
