= John Willis (RAF officer) =

Royal Air Force Air Chief Marshal (1937-2008)

Air Chief Marshal Sir John Willis GBE KCB FRAeS
- Born: 27 October 1937; London, England
- Died: 9 January 2008 (aged 70)
- Military career
- Allegiance: United Kingdom
- Branch: Royal Air Force
- Service years: 1955–1997
- Rank: Air Chief Marshal
- Commands: Vice-Chief of the Defence Staff (1995–97); Support Command (1992–94); RAF Akrotiri (1982–84); No. 27 Squadron (1975–77)
- Awards: Knight Grand Cross of the Order of the British Empire; Knight Commander of the Order of the Bath

Sir John Frederick Willis (27 October 1937 – 9 January 2008) was a senior Royal Air Force officer.

== Flying career ==
John Frederick Willis was born in London and educated at Dulwich College and the RAF College Cranwell. Willis gained his RAF commission in 1958 and went on to fly Vulcan bombers. He went on to be commanding officer of No. 27 Squadron at RAF Scampton. He was appointed deputy director of air staff plans at the Ministry of Defence in 1979, Station Commander at RAF Akrotiri on Cyprus in 1982 and Director of Air Staff Briefing & Co-ordination at the Ministry of Defence in 1985. Later that year he was made chief of the Special Weapons Branch at Headquarters SHAPE.

In 1989 he was appointed Assistant Chief of Defence Staff (Policy & Nuclear). He went on to be one of the RAF's most senior commanders, becoming Director-General of Training in 1991, air officer commanding-in chief of Support Command in 1992 and the Vice-Chief of the Defence Staff at the Ministry of Defence in 1995. He retired from the Royal Air Force in 1997.

In retirement he was a member of the council of the University of Newcastle upon Tyne and a patron of the Second World War Experience Centre. He was also actively involved in his local Royal Air Forces Association.

== Personal life ==
In 1959, while living in London, Sir John met his wife Merrill, who was a nurse. They married in 1960. They had five children together, Jonathan, David, Kate, Rachel, and Rob. Sir John had fourteen grandchildren: Rebecca, Michael, Gregory, William, Joe, Ben, Finn, Ella, Myles, George, Sarah, Daisy, Pip and Heidi.

Military offices
Preceded by Sir John Thomson	Commander-in-Chief, Support Command; 1992–1994	Command split up into Logistics Command under Sir Michael Alcock; Personnel and Training Command under Sir Andrew Wilson
Preceded by Sir Jock Slater	Vice-Chief of the Defence Staff; 1995–1997	Succeeded by Sir Peter Abbott
