= Victor Groom =

Royal Air Force Air Marshal (1898-1990)

Sir Victor Emmanuel Groom
- Born: 4 August 1898; Peckham, London, England
- Died: 6 December 1990 (aged 92); Surrey, England
- Military career
- Allegiance: United Kingdom
- Branch: British Army; Royal Air Force
- Service years: 1916–1955
- Rank: Air Marshal
- Units: Artists Rifles, London Regiment; West Yorkshire Regiment; No. 20 Squadron RFC/RAF; No. 111 Squadron RAF; No. 14 Squadron RAF; No. 55 Squadron RAF
- Commands: No. 28 Squadron RAF; No. 58 Squadron RAF; RAF Marham; No. 205 Group RAF; Middle East Air Force; Technical Training Command
- Conflicts: First World War; Second World War
- Awards: Knight Commander of the Royal Victorian Order; Knight Commander of the Order of the British Empire; Companion of the Order of the Bath; Distinguished Flying Cross & Bar; Mentioned in dispatches

Air Marshal Sir Victor Emmanuel Groom, KCVO, KBE, CB, DFC & Bar (4 August 1898 – 6 December 1990) was a senior officer in the British Royal Air Force and a flying ace of the First World War credited with eight aerial victories. He rose to become a consequential participant in air operations to support Operation Overlord, the invasion of France during the Second World War.

== Early life ==
Victor Emmanuel Groom was born 4 August 1898 in Peckham, London, England. Groom was educated at Alleyn's School, Dulwich. He enlisted into the Artists Rifles, London Regiment, as a private in 1916 and was commissioned as a second lieutenant in the West Yorkshire Regiment on 26 April 1917 before being attached to the Royal Flying Corps in September.

== World War I ==
Details of his training are unrecorded. However, Groom was appointed a flying officer on 30 January 1918 and placed on the General List of the Royal Flying Corps. On 18 March, he was assigned to No. 20 Squadron as a Bristol F.2 Fighter pilot.

On his first combat flight, his formation leader fired a Very flare that landed in the rear cockpit of Groom's Bristol. While the observer burned his hands smothering the fire that threatened to set off munitions, Groom safely landed. Having survived friendly fire, Groom began to triumph over enemy fire on 8 May 1918, when he began a string of eight victories that would take him through to 30 July. Groom's final tally was three enemy planes set afire, four otherwise destroyed, and one driven down out of control; his observer/gunner for all these victories was Ernest Hardcastle.

Groom went on leave, was laid low by influenza, and did not return to combat in France. Instead, upon recovery, he was posted to No. 111 Squadron in Egypt.

== Between the World Wars ==
On 1 August 1919, Groom was granted a permanent commission as a lieutenant. On 15 December, he switched to No. 14 Squadron in Palestine and on 22 May 1920, he continued Middle Eastern service with a new posting, to No. 55 Squadron.

On 25 March 1922, Groom returned home to begin a decade of staff assignments, enlivened only by being promoted from flying officer to flight lieutenant on 1 July 1924. He was given command of No. 28 Squadron on 26 October 1932. On 1 October 1934 he was promoted to squadron leader, his rank catching up with his position. He moved on to command of No. 58 Squadron, then on to staff work at Headquarters Bomber Command, even as he continued to ascend in rank. On 1 January 1938, having earned an OBE at Bomber Command, he was promoted to wing commander.

In 1924 He married Maisie Monica Maule (1909-1996); they had at least one son.

== World War II ==
On 1 September 1940, he was promoted to temporary group captain and became Station Commander at RAF Marham. In 1941, he moved back into staff work in the Directorate of Plans. The following year, he became head of the RAF Air Staff planning for Operation Overlord. As part of his duties there, he accompanied Air Chief Marshal Trafford Leigh-Mallory to North Africa to study operations there and bring home lessons learned. In the meantime, he continued his climb through the ranks: on 18 November 1942, he was confirmed as a group captain. On 1 June 1943, he was bumped up to temporary air commodore and on 8 September 1943 he was promoted to acting air vice marshal on appointment as Senior Air Staff Officer at Headquarters Second Tactical Air Force. On 8 September 1944 he was promoted to air commodore while acting as air vice marshal. In August 1945 he became Air Officer Administration at Headquarters Flying Training Command.

== Post World War II ==
Groom became Director General of Manning for the RAF on 1 January 1947 and took command of No. 205 Group on 20 October 1949. On 1 January 1952, he was promoted from air vice marshal to air marshal and appointed Knight Commander of the Order of the British Empire. He took command of the Middle East Air Force in February 1952 and Technical Training Command in July 1952.

Groom retired to Putney on 26 September 1955 and died in York on 6 December 1990.

== Honours and awards ==
- Distinguished Flying Cross – 2 November 1918

An officer of great courage and dash who never hesitates to attack the enemy regardless of the superiority in numbers. While on a recent patrol this officer was one of a formation of eight that engaged twenty-five hostile scouts. Lieut. Groom shot down one, and his observer (Lieut. Hardcastle) a few minutes later destroyed another. On a later date, accompanied by the same observer, they were attacked by twelve scouts; two of these they shot down.

- Bar to the Distinguished Flying Cross – 19 August 1921

For conspicuous skill and gallantry under fire. While taking part in a bombing expedition from Mosul on 5 May 1921, an aeroplane was shot down by rifle fire in hostile country three miles west of Batas. Flying Officer Groom at once landed and picked up the crew of this machine while under enemy fire. He then successfully took off down hill and returned safely to Mosul with two passengers in the back seat and a third lying on one of the planes. This officer, in addition to showing great promptitude and gallantry, also displayed marked skill in first landing safely under most difficult conditions and then taking off with a very excessive load.

- Officer of the Order of the British Empire – 11 July 1940
- Commander of the Order of the British Empire – 5 July 1945
- Mentioned in dispatches – 1 January 1946
- Knight Commander of the Order of the British Empire – 1 January 1952
- Knight Commander of the Royal Victorian Order – 16 July 1953

== Bibliography ==
- Guttman, Jon (2007). Bristol F 2 Fighter Aces of World War I. Oxford, UK: Osprey Publishing. ISBN 978-1-84603-201-1.
- Shores, Christopher F.; Franks, Norman & Guest, Russell F. (1990). Above the Trenches: a Complete Record of the Fighter Aces and Units of the British Empire Air Forces 1915–1920. London, UK: Grub Street. ISBN 978-0-948817-19-9.

Military offices
Preceded by Sir John Baker	Commander-in-Chief RAF Middle East Air Force; February 1952 – May 1952	Succeeded by Sir Arthur Sanders
Preceded by Sir John Whitworth-Jones	Air Officer Commanding-in-Chief Technical Training Command; 1952–1955	Succeeded by Sir George Beamish
