= RAF Technical Training Command =

Former command of the Royal Air Force

Technical Training Command
- RAF Technical Training Command badge
- Founded: 27 May 1940
- Country: United Kingdom
- Branch: Royal Air Force
- Role: Technical training
- Headquarters: RAF Shinfield Park, Reading; Brampton Park in Cambridgeshire
- Motto(s): Labore Terrestri Caelestis Victoria Latin: Victory in the air by dint of work on the ground
- Engagements: World War II

Technical Training Command was an organization within the Royal Air Force which controlled units responsible for delivering aircraft maintenance training and other non-flying training, initially in Berkshire and then in Cambridgeshire.

== History ==
Technical Training Command was formed from the elements of Training Command which were responsible for delivering aircraft maintenance training and other non-flying training on 27 May 1940. In 1945 the Command moved from Shinfield Park, Reading in Berkshire, where it had been established, to Brampton Grange in Cambridgeshire.

No. 26 Group RAF was reformed on 12 February 1940 within RAF Training Command, and transferred to Technical Training Command on 27 May 1940. It was transferred to RAF Bomber Command on 10 February 1942.

In its 13 May 1955 issue, Flight described the command as consisting of the RAF Technical College at RAF Henlow and RAF Debden, Nos 22, 24, and 27 Groups, No. 1 School of Technical Training RAF at Halton, No. 1 Radio School RAF at RAF Locking, No. 2 School of Technical Training RAF at Cosford "for boy entrants into the Services", the School of Administration, the WRAF Depot at RAF Hawkinge, two cookery schools, the Schools of Physical Training, Training Organisation and Method, Education, Firefighting and Rescue, Photography, Chaplains' School, the RAF Regiment Light Anti-Aircraft Gunnery School at Watchet, radio schools at Yatesbury and Compton Bassett, the Police Depot at RAF Netheravon, and the RAF Regiment Depot at Catterick.

In mid-1965 the Command was made up of No. 22 Group, No. 24 Group, the Record Office, and RAF Henlow.

It was eventually re-absorbed into the newly re-established Training Command on 1 June 1968.

== Air Officers Commanding-in-Chief ==
Air Officers Commanding-in-Chief were:

- 27 May 1940 Air Marshal Sir William Welsh
- 7 Jul 1941 Air Marshal Sir John Babington
- 1 Jun 1943 Air Marshal Sir Arthur Barratt
- 29 Oct 1945 Air Marshal Sir Ralph Sorley
- 12 Jul 1948 Air Marshal Sir John Whitworth-Jones
- 1 Jul 1952 Air Marshal Sir Victor Groom
- 15 Sep 1955 Air Marshal Sir George Beamish
- 10 Jan 1958 Air Marshal Sir Arthur McDonald
- 29 Sep 1959 Air Marshal Sir Wallace Kyle
- 12 Feb 1962 Air Marshal Sir Alfred Earle
- 15 Jan 1964 Air Marshal Sir Donald Evans
- 18 May 1966 Air Marshal Sir William Coles

== See also ==
- List of Royal Air Force commands

| Preceded by Training Command | Technical Training Command; 1940–1968 | Succeeded by Training Command |
