= No. 24 Group RAF =

Former Royal Air Force operations group

No. 24 (Technical Training) Group RAF ~~No. 24 (Training) Group RAF~~ ~~No. 24 (Northern) (Operations) Group~~
- Royal Air Force Ensign
- Active: 26 June 1918 – 13 June 1919; 10 July 1936 – 29 December 1975
- Country: United Kingdom
- Branch: Royal Air Force
- Type: Royal Air Force group
- Role: Military aviation training
- Part of: RAF Training Command (July 1936 – May 1940, June 1968 – December 1975); RAF Technical Training Command (May 1940 – June 1968)
- Motto(s): Latin: Tuti Volent ("They want to be safe")

Commanders
- Notable commanders: Air Marshal Sir Bertine Entwisle Sutton KBE, CB, DSO, MC

No. 24 Group RAF (24 Gp) is a former Royal Air Force group. It formed in June 1918 from No. 46 and 48 Wings, disbanding in June 1919. The group reformed in July 1936 as No. 24 (Training) Group within RAF Training Command, and transferred to RAF Technical Training Command in May 1940, becoming No. 24 (Technical Training) Group. It disbanded in December 1975.

== History ==
=== First World War ===
No. 24 Group was formed on 26 June 1918 at Castle Grove, Leeds, as No. 24 (Northern) (Operations) Group. On 8 August 1918 "(Northern)" was removed from the designation and later on the group HQ moved to Moor House, Leeds. It planned to move the HQ to Bramham Moor Aerodrome on 24 May 1919, but disbanded on 13 June 1919.

=== Second World War ===
The group reformed as No. 24 (Training) Group on 10 July 1936 at RAF Halton. It was initially within RAF Training Command, but moved to RAF Technical Training Command on 27 May 1940, being redesignated as No. 24 (Technical Training) Group. On 3 November 1940 the group HQ relocated to the Bell Hotel in Gloucester but three months later, on 19 January 1941, it moved to Hindlip Hall, situated near Worcester. Over three and half years later it moved to RAF Credenhill, near Hereford, in October 1944, and four months later, in February 1945, it then moved to RAF Halton.

=== Cold War ===
In December 1945 the group HQ moved to Green Park, (Aston Clinton), Aylesbury. It remained in Buckinghamshire for eight years and then moved to RAF Spitalgate, on 25 March 1954, before finally settling at Rudloe Manor in Wiltshire, on 1 September 1958. RAF Technical Training Command disbanded in 1968 and the group transferred back into RAF Training Command. No. 24 Group disbanded on 29 December 1975.

== Structure ==
November 1939

No. 24 Group was responsible for various recruit centres, and Schools of Technical Training.

- HQ at RAF Halton
  - RAF Boscombe Down
    - Aeroplane and Armament Experimental Establishment with various aircraft
  - RAF St Athan
    - Special Duty Flight, St Athan, Martlesham Heath, and Christchurch, RAF, with various aircraft. Connected with the Telecommunications Research Establishment.

== Air Officers Commanding ==
Note: The ranks shown are the ranks held at the time of holding the appointment of Air Officer Commanding, No. 24 Group Royal Air Force.

No. 24 Group commanding officers
Rank	name	from
	?	July 1918
Disbanded		June 1919
Air Vice-Marshall	John Tremayne Babington	July 1936
Air Vice-Marshall	Paul Maltby	September 1938
Air Vice-Marshall	Bertine Sutton	November 1940
Air Commodore	G B Dacre	1940
Air Vice-Marshall	H H MacL Fraser	February 1943
Air Vice-Marshall	Kenneth Leask	January 1944
Air Vice-Marshall	Leslie Harvey	January 1948
Air Vice-Marshall	R O Jones	December 1949
Air Vice-Marshall	J G Franks	September 1952
Air Vice-Marshall	G B Beardsworth	February 1955
Air Vice-Marshall	H D Speckley	April 1957
Air Vice-Marshall	J Marson	January 1959
Air Vice-Marshall	T N Coslett	July 1961
Air Vice-Marshall	J K Rotherham	March 1963
Air Vice-Marshall	B Robinson	June 1965
Air Vice-Marshall	J H Hunter-Tod	August 1967
Air Vice-Marshall	R E W Harland	February 1970
Air Vice-Marshall	C S Betts	January 1972
