= Arthur John Capel =

Royal Air Force Air Vice-Marshal (1894-1979)

- Born: 11 December 1894
- Died: 18 April 1979 (aged 84)
- Military career
- Allegiance: United Kingdom
- Branch: British Army (1914–18); Royal Air Force (1918–45)
- Service years: 1914–1945
- Rank: Air Vice-Marshal
- Commands: No. 20 Group RAF (1941); No. 22 Group RAF (1940); School of Army Co-operation (1936–38); No. 5 Squadron RAF (1923–28); No. 43 Squadron RAF (1919); No. 92 Squadron RAF (1919); No. 94 Squadron RAF (1917–19)
- Conflicts: First World War; Pink's War; Second World War
- Awards: Companion of the Order of the Bath; Distinguished Service Order; Distinguished Flying Cross; Mentioned in Despatches (3)

Air Vice-Marshal Arthur John Capel, CB, DSO, DFC, DL, JP (11 December 1894 – 18 April 1979) was a senior Royal Air Force officer.

== Military career ==
Having served in the British Army during the First World War in the Somerset Light Infantry and then Royal Flying Corps, Capel joined the Royal Air Force (RAF) on its creation in 1918. He was involved in Pink's War, the RAF's first independent operation that was an air-to-ground campaign in Waziristan, and for which he was awarded the Distinguished Service Order. He rose up the ranks, and served as Commandant of the School of Army Co-operation (1936–1938), Air Officer Commanding (AOC) No. 22 (Army Co-operation) Group (1940), and AOC No. 20 (Training) Group (1941). During the Second World War, he served in the United Kingdom, France and the Middle East.

== Later career ==
After retiring from the RAF in 1945, Capel served as a magistrate and councillor in Somerset, and was High Sheriff of Somerset for 1952.
