= Joseph Hardcastle =

Joseph Hardcastle may refer to:

- Joseph Hardcastle (1752–1819), English merchant and a founder of The Missionary Society
- Joseph Hardcastle (politician), grandson of the above and British Liberal Party MP
- Joseph Alfred Hardcastle, FRAS (1868–1917), grandson of Joseph Hardcastle (politician) and Sir John Herschel appointed Director of Armagh Observatory just before his death
- Joseph Hardcastle (accountant) (died 1906), American Certified Public Accountant
