= David Harcourt-Smith =

British air force officer (1931–2024)

Air Chief Marshal Sir David Harcourt-Smith
- Born: 14 October 1931; Singapore
- Died: 4 August 2024 (aged 92); Amesbury
- Relatives: Air Vice Marshal Gilbert Harcourt-Smith (father)
- Military career
- Allegiance: United Kingdom
- Branch: Royal Air Force
- Service years: 1952–1989
- Rank: Air Chief Marshal
- Commands: Support Command (1984–86); Royal Air Force College Cranwell (1978–80); RAF Bruggen (1972–74); No. 6 Squadron (1969–70); No. 54 Squadron (1963–65)
- Conflicts: Aden Emergency
- Awards: Knight Grand Cross of the Order of the British Empire; Knight Commander of the Order of the Bath; Distinguished Flying Cross

Air Chief Marshal Sir David Harcourt-Smith, GBE, KCB, DFC (14 October 1931 – 4 August 2024) was a Royal Air Force officer who served as Air Officer Commanding-in-Chief at RAF Support Command from 1984 to 1986. He is the author of Wings Over Suez, an account of air operations during the Sinai and Suez wars.

== RAF career ==
Educated at Felsted School and the Royal Air Force College Cranwell, Harcourt-Smith was commissioned into the Royal Air Force in 1952. He flew the DH Venom fighter-bomber in the Suez Crisis and Aden Emergency, where he won the Distinguished Flying Cross for gallantry and devotion to duty in 1957.

Harcourt-Smith was appointed Officer Commanding No. 54 Squadron in 1963 and Officer Commanding No. 6 Squadron in 1969 before moving on to be Station Commander at RAF Bruggen in 1972 and Commandant of the Royal Air Force College Cranwell in 1978. He went on to be Assistant Chief of the Air Staff (Operational Requirements) in 1980, Air Officer Commanding-in-Chief at RAF Support Command in 1984 and Controller of Aircraft in 1986. As Controller of Aircraft he oversaw the introduction of the Tucano training aircraft. He retired in 1989.

== Personal life and death ==
In 1957 Harcourt-Smith married Dorothy Mary Entwistle; they had two sons and one daughter. He died on 4 August 2024, at the age of 92.

Military offices
Preceded by Sir Michael Beavis	Commander-in-Chief Support Command; 1984–1986	Succeeded by Sir John Sutton
