= Ernest Hardcastle =

English World War I flying ace observer/gunner

- Born: 31 December 1898; Dudley Hill, Bradford, England
- Died: November 1973 (aged 74); Bexhill-on-Sea, Sussex, England
- Military career
- Allegiance: United Kingdom
- Branch: British Army; Royal Air Force
- Service years: c.1916–1919 1940–1945
- Rank: Lieutenant
- Unit: No. 20 Squadron RAF
- Conflicts: World War I; Western Front; World War II
- Awards: Distinguished Flying Cross

Lieutenant Ernest Hardcastle DFC (31 December 1898 – November 1973) was an English World War I flying ace observer/gunner credited with twelve aerial victories. He would return to military service during World War II.

== Early life and service ==
Ernest Hardcastle was born on 31 December 1898 in Dudley Hill, Bradford, England.

Hardcastle worked for the Bradford Chamber of Commerce until World War I began. He enlisted in the Yorkshire Regiment, but transferred to the Royal Flying Corps in August 1917, and after initial training as a cadet, was commissioned as a temporary second lieutenant (on probation) on 30 January 1918. He was assigned to No. 20 Squadron RAF as an observer/gunner on 18 April 1918.

== World War I aerial service ==
Hardcastle's winning streak began on 8 May 1918 and ended on 30 July 1918, with all but one victory being over an enemy fighter aircraft. His final claim tally was nine destroyed and three 'driven down out of control'. The pilots aiding him included fellow aces Lieutenants Victor Groom and August Iaccaci, as well as Captains Douglas Graham Cooke, and Horace Percy Lale. Hardcastle was awarded the Distinguished Flying Cross, which was gazetted on 2 November 1918.

On 20 December 1918 he relinquished his commission for reasons of ill health resulting from military service. Hardcastle was transferred to the unemployed list by the Royal Air Force on 13 February 1919.

== World War II ==
Hardcastle returned to military service in World War II, being commissioned as a pilot officer (on probation) in the Royal Air Force Volunteer Reserve on 30 September 1940. On 30 September 1941 he was confirmed in his appointment as a flying officer. On 1 January 1943 he was promoted to flight lieutenant. On 9 June 1945, he again relinquished his commission on account of medical unfitness.

== Honours and awards ==
Distinguished Flying Cross
Lieutenant Ernest Hardcastle

This officer displayed great courage and skill on two occasions when he was observer in company with Lieut. Groom. While on patrol their formation of eight attacked twenty-five hostile scouts; he and Lieut. Groom accounted for two. On another occasion, when with the same officer, they were attacked by twelve scouts, two of these they shot down.
