= Fontaine-sur-Maye =

- Commune
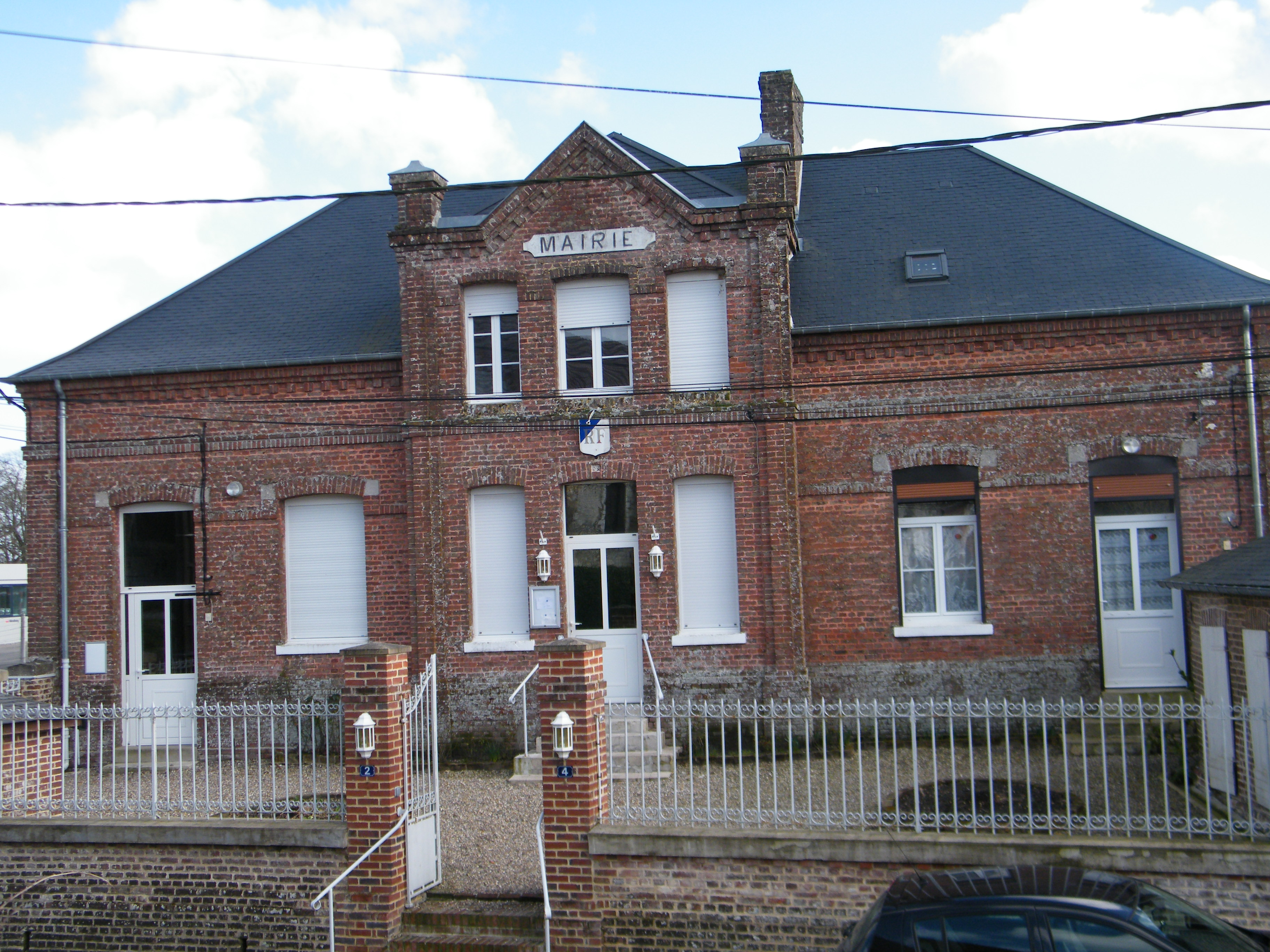
- The town hall in Fontaine
- Location of Fontaine-sur-Maye
- Location within France Location within Hauts-de-France
- Coordinates: 50°14′15″N 1°55′37″E
- Country: France
- Region: Hauts-de-France
- Department: Somme
- Arrondissement: Abbeville
- Canton: Rue
- Intercommunality: CC Ponthieu-Marquenterre

Government
  - Mayor (2020–2026): Dominique Miramont
- Area^{1}: 5.67 km^{2} (2.19 sq mi)
- Elevation: 24 m (79 ft)
- Highest elevation: 75 m (246 ft)
- Lowest elevation: 33 m (108 ft)
- Population (2023): 162
  - Density: 28.6/km^{2} (74.0/sq mi)
- Time zone: UTC+01:00 (CET)
  - Summer (DST): UTC+02:00 (CEST)
- INSEE/Postal code: 80327 /80150
- ^{1} French Land Register data, which excludes lakes, ponds, glaciers > 1 km^{2} (0.386 sq mi or 247 acres) and river estuaries.

Fontaine-sur-Maye (Picard: Fontainne-su-Mèye) is a commune in the Somme department in Hauts-de-France in northern France.

== Geography ==
The commune is situated on the D56 road, some 15 miles (24 km) northeast of Abbeville.

== Population ==
Historical population
Year	Pop.	±% p.a.
1968	191	—
1975	157	−2.76%
1982	151	−0.56%
1990	139	−1.03%
1999	129	−0.83%
2007	151	+1.99%
2012	158	+0.91%
2017	161	+0.38%
2023	162	+0.10%
Source: INSEE

== See also ==
- Communes of the Somme department
