= RAF Support Command =

Defunct command element of the Royal Air Force

RAF Support Command HQ Support Command
- RAF Support Command badge
- Active: 1973-1977; 1977-1994
- Country: United Kingdom
- Branch: Royal Air Force
- Role: Logistical and maintenance support
- Size: 18,144 uniformed personnel (1993)
- Headquarters: RAF Brampton
- Motto: Ut Aquilae Volent (Latin: That Eagles May Fly)

Support Command was a command of the Royal Air Force between 1973 and 1994. The headquarters was located at RAF Brampton in Cambridgeshire.

== History ==
It was formed on 31 August 1973 by the renaming of RAF Maintenance Command, with No. 90 (Signals) Group being added to it becoming HQ Support Command based at RAF Andover. On 1 July 1977 it merged with RAF Training Command to become RAF Support Command.. Its responsibilities included all logistical and maintenance support requirements of the RAF. Among its first stations assigned may have been RAF Gan, transferred from Far East Air Force. It was renamed as RAF Support Command, and its role further increased, on 13 June 1977 when it absorbed Training Command, making it additionally responsible for all RAF ground and aircrew training. In 1982, Support Command had an inventory of 500 aircraft and 49,000 personnel, which included 14,000 civilians and 8,000 trainees.

Support Command undertook training for all officers and other ranks, which was delivered at Biggin Hill, Cosford, Cranwell, Digby, Finningley, Halton, Henlow, Hereford, Leeming, Linton-on-Ouse, Locking, Newton, North Luffenham, St Athan, Sealand, Shawbury, Swinderby, and Valley. One major function of Support Command was facilitating medical training and delivery of medical services. This involved the control of the RAF Hospitals at Ely, Halton, Nocton Hall and Wroughton. Support Command was also responsible for the rehabilitation centres at Chessington and Headley Court.

In the 1980s the bunker at RAF Holmpton was converted to form a new Emergency War Headquarters for RAF Support Command. In the year before it was disbanded (1993), Support Command had 18,144 uniformed personnel under its structure, spread across 40 locations. In October 1985, the HQ building of Support Command at RAF Brampton was destroyed by fire. Staff had to move into temporary accommodation until a new HQ building was built, with the final cost coming in at around £44 million. The new HQ was opened on 7 June 1988 by the Duke of Gloucester.

In 1994 the Command was split up, with many of its functions merging with those of the RAF Personnel Management Centre to form RAF Personnel and Training Command, and others being hived off into RAF Logistics Command.

== Units ==
- Radio Engineering Unit (previously Signals Development Unit) was formed on 1 January 1950 at Henlow. It was disbanded on 14 September 1981 and became the Royal Air Force Signals Engineering Establishment and the Support Command Signals Staff
- No. 90 (Signals) Group became the Support Command Signals Headquarters (SCSHQ) which was formed at Medmenham. The headquarters was disbanded on 14 September 1981 and became the Royal Air Force Signals Engineering Establishment and the Support Command Signals Staff
- Royal Air Force Signals Engineering Establishment (RAFSEE) (previously the Radio Engineering Unit and the SCSHQ) was formed on 14 September 1981 at Henlow. During 1984 it became a Defence Agency within RAF Logistics Command
- Support Command Signals Staff (SCSS) (previously Support Command Signals Headquarters) was formed at RAF Henlow on 14 September 1981, moving to Brampton during 1994
- Support Command Flight Checking Unit was formed at RAF Brize Norton on 1 March 1976, the unit moved to RAF Benson on 4 January 1983, it was disbanded on 5 January 1987

== Air Officers Commanding-in-Chief ==
The following officers have held the appointment of Air Officer Commanding-in-Chief RAF Support Command:

- 31 Aug 1973 - Air Marshal Sir Reginald Harland
- 13 Jun 1977 - Air Marshal Sir Rex Roe
- 30 Aug 1978 - Air Marshal Sir Keith Williamson
- 3 May 1980 - Air Marshal Sir John Gingell
- 27 Apr 1981 - Air Marshal Sir Michael Beavis
- 15 Feb 1984 - Air Marshal Sir David Harcourt-Smith
- 2 Jan 1986 - Air Marshal Sir John Sutton
- 5 Apr 1989 - Air Chief Marshal Sir Michael Graydon
- 8 May 1990 - Air Chief Marshal Sir John Thomson
- 5 Oct 1992 - Air Chief Marshal Sir John Willis

== See also ==
- List of Royal Air Force commands

Preceded by Maintenance Command	HQ Support Command; 1973-1977; RAF Support Command; 1977–1994	Succeeded by Personnel and Training Command
Preceded by Training Command; Absorbed on 13 June 1977	HQ Support Command; 1973-1977; RAF Support Command; 1977–1994	Succeeded by Logistics Command
