= 1965 New Year Honours =

British royal recognitions

The New Year Honours 1965 were appointments in many of the Commonwealth realms of Queen Elizabeth II to various orders and honours to reward and highlight good works by citizens of those countries. They were announced in supplements to the London Gazette of 29 December 1964 to celebrate the year passed and mark the beginning of 1965.

At this time honours for Australians were awarded both in the United Kingdom honours, on the advice of the premiers of Australian states, and also in a separate Australia honours list.

The recipients of honours are displayed here as they were styled before their new honour, and arranged by honour, with classes (Knight, Knight Grand Cross, etc.) and then divisions (Military, Civil, etc.) as appropriate.

== United Kingdom and Commonwealth ==
=== Baron (Life Peer) ===
- George James Cole, Chairman, Unilever Ltd.
- Sir Howard Walter Florey, MD. For services to Medicine.
- Sir Christopher Hinton, KBE, lately Chairman, Central Electricity Generating Board.
- Sir William Graham Holford, Professor of Town Planning, University College, London.

=== Privy Councillor ===
- The Honourable Mr. Justice Stable, MC, QC, (Sir Wintringham Norton Stable), Judge of the High Court of Justice, Queen's Bench Division.

=== Knight Bachelor ===
- John Bailey. For political and public services in Bradford.
- Professor Robert Vivian Bradlaw, CBE, DDSc, DDS, President, General Dental Council.
- Alderman Dryden Brook. For political and public services in Halifax.
- His Honour Walker Kelly Carter, QC, Senior Official Referee, Supreme Court of Judicature.
- Charles Mills Cawley, CBE, Chief Scientist, Ministry of Power.
- Leonard Cooke, OBE, President, Co-operative Wholesale Society Ltd.
- David Paton Cuthbertson, CBE, MD, Director, Rowett Research Institute, Bucksburn, Aberdeenshire.
- Colonel William Lang Denholm, TD, DL, Chairman, Shipping Federation Ltd.
- Maurice Alberic Twisleton-Wykeham-Fiennes, Chairman, Davy & United Engineering Company, and for services to export.
- Alderman Nicholas Garrow, OBE. For political and public services in Northumberland.
- Alderman William Hemingway, JP. For political and public services in Leeds.
- Alderman Mark Henig. For political and public services in Leicester.
- Alderman Gilbert Samuel Inglefield, TD, Aldermanic Sheriff, City of London.
- John Kenneth Trevor Jones, CBE, Legal Adviser, Home Office.
- William Ross McLean, VRD, QC, Sheriff of the Lothians and Peebles.
- John McMichael, MD, FRCP, Professor of Medicine, University of London.
- Stanley Matthews, CBE. For services to Association Football.
- Peter Lowrie Meldrum, JP, Lord Provost of Glasgow.
- Karl Raimund Popper, Professor of Logic and Scientific Method, University of London.
- Gilbert Roberts, Partner, Freeman Fox & Partners, Consulting Engineers.
- Frederick Stratten Russell, CBE, DSC, DFC, Secretary to the Council of the Marine Biological Association of the United Kingdom and Director of the Plymouth Laboratory.
- Owen Alfred Saunders, Professor of Mechanical Engineering and Head of Department, Imperial College, University of London.
- Nicholas Thomas Sekers, MBE, Founder and Manager of the Rosehill Theatre. Managing Director, West Cumberland Silk Mills Ltd.
- Harold Charles Shearman. For services to Education.
- Professor Laurence Dudley Stamp, CBE, President, Royal Geographical Society. For services to land use.
- Joseph Lincoln Spedding Steel, Chairman, Triplex Holdings Ltd.
- Cyril James Stubblefield, Director, Geological Survey of Great Britain and Museum of Practical Geology.
- Ronald George Thornton, Vice-Chairman, Barclays Bank Ltd, and for services to export.
- Theodore Henry Tylor, Chairman, Executive Council, Royal National Institute for the Blind.
- Charles Haynes Wilson, Principal and Vice-Chancellor, University of Glasgow.

State of Victoria

- The Honourable Edward Herbert Hudson, a Justice of the Supreme Court of the State of Victoria.
- Eric Scott, OBE. For his services to pharmacy in the State of Victoria.

State of Queensland

- William Alfred Brand, CBE, of Childers, State of Queensland. For public services, particularly to the sugar industry.

State of South Australia

- Richard George Hawker, a leading industrialist and pastoralist in the State of South Australia.

State of Western Australia

- Ernest Thorley Loton, JP. For public services in the State of Western Australia.

Commonwealth Relations

- Horace John Croot, CBE, FRCS, LRCP, Senior Specialist and Surgeon, Uganda.
- The Honourable Albert Michael Margai, Prime Minister of Sierra Leone.
- Malin Sorsbie, CBE, Chairman, Munitalp Foundation, Kenya.

Overseas Territories

- Alfred Étienne Jerome Dupuch, OBE. For public services in Bahamas.
- Richard Lyle Le Gallais, Chief Justice, Aden.

=== Order of the Bath ===
==== Knight Grand Cross of the Order of the Bath (GCB) ====
Military Division

- Admiral Sir Charles Edward Madden, Bt., KCB.
- General Sir William Gurdon Stirling, KCB, CBE, DSO, ADC (Gen.), (36888), Colonel Commandant, Royal Regiment of Artillery.

Civil Division

- Sir Thomas Padmore, KCB, Permanent Secretary, Ministry of Transport.

==== Knight Commander of the Order of the Bath (KCB) ====
Military Division

Royal Navy

- Vice-Admiral Ronald Vernon Brockman, CSI, CIE, CBE.
- Vice-Admiral Frank Roddam Twiss, CB, DSC.

Army

- Major-General George Sinclair Cole, CB, CBE, (52577), late Royal Regiment of Artillery.
- Lieutenant-General Geoffrey Randolph Dixon Musson, CB, CBE, DSO, (45438), Colonel, The King's Shropshire Light Infantry.

Royal Air Force

- Acting Air Marshal Brian Kenyon Burnett, CB, DFC, AFC.
- Acting Air Marshal Peter Guy Wykeham, CB, DSO, OBE, DFC, AFC.

Civil Division

- Sir Edmund Gerald Compton, KBE, CB, Comptroller and Auditor General, Exchequer and Audit Department.
- William Arthur Harvey Druitt, CB, HM Procurator General and Treasury Solicitor.
- Martin Teall Flett, CB, Second Permanent Under-Secretary of State (Royal Air Force), Ministry of Defence.

==== Companion of the Order of the Bath (CB) ====
Military Division

Royal Navy

- Surgeon Rear-Admiral Maurice Henry Adams, QHS, MB, BCh.
- Rear-Admiral Patrick Uniacke Bayly, DSC.
- Rear-Admiral Francis Brian Price Brayne-Nicholls, DSC.
- Rear-Admiral David Granville Clutterbuck.
- Rear-Admiral Donald Cameron Ernest Forbes Gibson, DSC.
- Surgeon Rear-Admiral John Morley Holford, OBE, QHP, MB, MRCS.
- Acting Major General Bertram George Ralfs.
- The Venerable Archdeacon Raymond William Richardson, QHC.
- Rear-Admiral David Apthorp Williams, DSC.

Army

- Major-General Edward John Hunter Bates, OBE, MC, late Royal Regiment of Artillery.
- Major-General Ewing Henry Wrigley Grimshaw, CBE, DSO, late infantry.
- Major-General William Herbert Hargreaves, OBE, FRCP, MRCS, late Royal Army Medical Corps.
- Major-General Eustace John Blois Nelson, DSO, MVO, OBE, MC, late Foot Guards.
- Major-General Marshall St John Oswald, CBE, DSO, MC, late Royal Regiment of Artillery.
- Major-General John Anthony Jervis Read, CBE, DSO, MC, late Infantry.
- Major-General Robert Alexander Stephen, CBE, QHS, MD, ChM, late Royal Army Medical Corps.
- Major-General Francis Brian Wyldbore-Smith, DSO, OBE, late Royal Armoured Corps.

Royal Air Force

- Air Vice-Marshal William Vernon Crawford-Compton, CBE, DSO, DFC.
- Air Vice-Marshal Peter Carteret Fletcher, OBE, DFC, AFC.
- Air Vice-Marshal Edgar Knowles, CBE.
- Air Vice-Marshal Geoffrey Leonard Seabrook.
- Acting Air Vice-Marshal Norman Colpoy Simpson Rutter, CBE.
- Air Commodore George Roy Gunn, OBE, MB, CB.
- Air Commodore Ian Douglas Napier Lawson CBE, DFC.

Civil Division

- William Eden Tatton-Brown, Chief Architect, Ministry of Health.
- The Right Honourable Ronald John Bilsland, Baron Clydesmuir, MBE, TD, President, Territorial and Auxiliary Forces Association for the County of Lanark.
- Frank John Doggett, Under-Secretary (Establishments and Organisation), Ministry of Aviation.
- Julian Clement Peter Elliston, TD, Parliamentary Counsel.
- Alexander Thomas Kingdom Grant, CMG, Under-Secretary, Export Credits Guarantee Department.
- Peter Henderson, MD, Principal Medical Officer, Department of Education and Science.
- Harold William Hobbs, CBE, Deputy Controller, Royal Ordnance Factories, Ministry of Defence (Army).
- Kenneth Roderick Mackenzie, Clerk of Public Bills, House of Commons.
- Frank Fiddes Main, MB, FRCP (Ed.), Chief Medical Officer, Ministry of Health and Local Government for Northern Ireland.
- John Hayes Marriott, OBE, attached Ministry of Defence.
- Charles James Maston, CBE, Under-Secretary, Ministry of Labour.
- Antony Dillwyn Peck, MBE, Deputy Under-Secretary of State (Programmes and Budget), Ministry of Defence (Central Staff).
- Albert William Cecil Ryland, Director of Inland Telecommunications, General Post Office.
- John Hugh Street, Under-Secretary, Ministry of Housing and Local Government.
- John Crighton Thompson, CBE, Director of Naval Electrical Engineering, Ministry of Defence (Navy).

=== Order of Saint Michael and Saint George ===
==== Knight Grand Cross of the Order of St Michael and St George (GCMG) ====
- Sir Joseph John Saville Garner, KCMG, Permanent Under-Secretary of State, Commonwealth Relations Office.
- Sir Evelyn Dennison Hone, KCMG, CVO, OBE, lately Governor of Northern Rhodesia.

==== Dame Commander of the Order of St Michael and St George (DCMG) ====
- Nancy Broadfield Parkinson, CBE, Controller, Home Division, British Council.

==== Knight Commander of the Order of St Michael and St George (KCMG) ====
- Cosmo Dugal Patrick Thomas Haskard, CMG, MBE, Governor and Commander-in-Chief, Falkland Islands.
- Roger William Jackling, CMG, Deputy Permanent Representative of the United Kingdom to the United Nations.
- Anthony Handley Lincoln, CMG, CVO, Her Majesty's Ambassador Extraordinary and Plenipotentiary in Caracas.
- The Honourable John Patrick Edward Chandos Henniker-Major, CMG, CVO, MC, Her Majesty's Ambassador Extraordinary and Plenipotentiary in Copenhagen.
- Archibald Duncan Wilson, CMG, Her Majesty's Ambassador Extraordinary and Plenipotentiary in Belgrade.

==== Companion of the Order of St Michael and St George (CMG) ====
- Ewen Broadbent, formerly Assistant Secretary, Sovereign Base Areas Administration, Cyprus, Ministry of Defence (Air).
- Alexander Currall, Senior Trade Commissioner, Canada.
- Colonel Edgar Allen Griffin, OBE, ED, Regional Director, Southern Region, Commonwealth War Graves Commission.
- William Douglas Sweaney, Assistant Secretary, Ministry of Overseas Development.
- John Arthur Briscoe Allan, Commissioner of Prisons, Kenya.
- David Lee Cole, MC, British High Commissioner in Malawi.
- David John Coward, OBE, Registrar-General, Official Receiver and Public Trustee, Kenya.
- Lieutenant-Colonel Charles Royal Dickenson, Postmaster General, Southern Rhodesia.
- Marcus Bertram Hoare, QC, of Brisbane, State of Queensland. For services to the welfare of ex-servicemen and women.
- Norman Stewart Carey Jones, Permanent Secretary, Ministry of Lands and Settlement, Kenya.
- Denis Owen Mathews, OBE, General Manager, East African Tourist Travel Association, Kenya.
- Clement Aubrey Pounsett, Public Service Commissioner and Chairman, Public Service Board, State of South Australia.
- The Honourable Arthur Gordon Rylah, ED, Chief Secretary and Attorney-General, State of Victoria.
- Harold Smedley, MBE, British High Commissioner in Ghana.
- Peter Ernest Walters, Civil Secretary, Eastern Region, Kenya.
- Gavin Edward Wyatt, Managing Director, East African Power and Lighting Company Ltd, Kenya.
- Ewen Cameron Thomson, Permanent Secretary, Ministry of Transport and Communications, Northern Rhodesia. (Dated 23 October 1964).
- Samuel Horatio Graham, OBE, Administrator, St. Vincent.
- Lawrence John Hobson, OBE, Political Adviser to the High Commissioner for Aden and the Protectorate of South Arabia.
- George Peter Lloyd, Colonial Secretary, Seychelles.
- Donald Alonzo Wiles, OBE, lately, Administrator, Montserrat.
- Michael Gerard Laurie Joy, MC, lately Counsellor, Her Majesty's Embassy, Stockholm.
- John Ormsby MCormick, MC, Foreign Office.
- Antony Ross Moore, lately Foreign Office.
- Norman Jordan-Moss, Counsellor, United Kingdom Delegation to the Organisation for Economic Co-operation and Development.
- Peter Richard Oliver, lately Counsellor, Her Majesty's Embassy, Djakarta.
- Stephen John Linley Olver, MBE, lately Counsellor (Administration), Her Majesty's Embassy, Washington.
- Reginald Arthur Phillips, OBE, Assistant Director-General, British Council.
- Alan Desmond Frederick Pemberton-Pigott, lately Foreign Office.
- Caryl Oliver Imbert Ramsden, Counsellor, Her Majesty Embassy, Brussels.
- Donald Claude Tebbit, Counsellor, Her Majesty's Embassy, Copenhagen.

=== Royal Victorian Order ===
==== Knight Commander of the Royal Victorian Order (KCVO) ====
- William Godfrey Agnew, CVO.
- The Reverend Maurice Frederic Foxell, CVO.
- Francis Galloway Leslie, CVO, MRCS, LRCP.

==== Commander of the Royal Victorian Order (CVO) ====
- Professor Arthur Aspinall.
- Major-General Cyril Harry Colquhoun, CB, OBE.
- The Right Honourable Ann Fortune, Countess of Euston, JP.
- The Right Honourable Elizabeth Mary, Countess of Leicester.
- Lieutenant-Colonel Eric Charles William Mackenzie Penn, OBE, MC.
- Major Robert Stephens, ERD.
- Francis John Bagot Watson, MVO.
- Percy Arthur White.

==== Member of the Royal Victorian Order (MVO) ====
At this time the two lowest classes of the Royal Victorian Order were "Member (fourth class)" and "Member (fifth class)", both with post-nominal letters MVO. "Member (fourth class)" was renamed "Lieutenant" (LVO) from the 1985 New Year Honours onwards.

Fourth Class

- Commander James Morgan Child, Royal Navy.
- William Paul Oke Cleave.
- Commander Richard Lovell Hewitt, Royal Navy.
- Enid Price Hill, MVO.
- Thomas Woodard.
- John Woodman.

Fifth Class

- Gordon Herbert Franklin.
- George Leslie Hawes.
- Philip Harold Venning.

=== Order of the British Empire ===
==== Knight Grand Cross of the Order of the British Empire (GBE) ====
Military Division

- Air Chief Marshal Sir Walter Cheshire, KCB, CBE, ADC, Royal Air Force.

Civil Division

- Lieutenant-Colonel The Right Honourable Alexander Robert Gisborne Gordon, CBE, DSO, DL, Speaker of the Senate, Northern Ireland, 1961-1964, Minister in the Senate, 1951-1961.

==== Dame Commander of the Order of the British Empire (DBE) ====
Civil Division

- The Right Honourable Hester Agnes, Baroness Adrian, BEM. For services to health including mental health, and education.
- The Right Honourable Margaret, Baroness Wakehurst. For public services in Northern Ireland.

Military Division

Royal Navy

- Commandant Edith Margaret Drummond, OBE, Hon ADC, Director, Women's Royal Naval Service.

==== Knight Commander of the Order of the British Empire (KBE) ====
Military Division

Royal Navy

- Instructor Rear-Admiral Charles Roy Darlington.

Army

- Major-General Christopher Earle Welby-Everard, CB, OBE, late Infantry (now R.A.R.O.), General Officer Commanding, Nigerian Army.

Royal Air Force

- Acting Air Marshal Patrick Hunter Dunn, CB, CBE, DFC.
- Air Vice-Marshal David John Pryer Lee, CB, CBE.

Civil Division

- Sir Edmund Castell Bacon, Bt., OBE, TD, Chairman, British Sugar Corporation Ltd.
- Sir Henry Frank Harding Jones, MBE, Chairman of the Gas Council.
- John Walley, CB, Deputy Secretary, Ministry of Pensions and National Insurance.
- Colonel John Edmund Hugh Boustead, CMG, DSO, OBE, MC, Political Agent, Abu Dhabi.
- Cornelius Ewen MacLean Greenfield, CMG, MBE, Secretary to the Treasury, Southern Rhodesia.
- Alexander Falconer Giles, CMG, MBE, Resident Commissioner, Basutoland.

==== Commander of the Order of the British Empire (CBE) ====
Military Division

Royal Navy

- Captain Bernard Harden Champion, MBE.
- Colonel Federick Basil Clifford, Royal Marines (Retired).
- Commodore Clifford Edgecombe, RD, Royal Naval Reserve.
- Captain Edward Nelson Hickson.
- Surgeon Captain John Alison Page, QHS, MB, BCh.
- Captain Alan William Frank Sutton, DSC. ADC.
- Captain William Frederick Carew Wreford, (Retired).

Army

- Brigadier Hereward Emanuel Boulter, DSO, (384870), late Infantry (now R.A.R.O.).
- Brigadier Robert Henry Bright, OBE, (53664), late Royal Armoured Corps (now R.A.R.O.).
- Brigadier Robert Digby Buck (33324), Royal Army Pay Corps.
- Colonel John Taillefer Childs (166540), late Royal Armoured Corps.
- Colonel Patrick Godfrey Llewellyn Cousens (53734), late Infantry.
- Brigadier Thomas Hayward Evill, DSO, (47244), late Corps of Royal Engineers (now R.A.R.O.).
- Colonel Leonard Patrick Joseph Herbert (384021), Royal Army Ordnance Corps.
- Brigadier David Gladwyn Jebb, DSO, OBE, (53718), late Infantry.
- Colonel Robert de Lisle King, OBE, (67150), late Infantry.
- Brigadier Robert Eric Loder (52660), late Infantry.
- Brigadier Lennox Ross Selby MacFarlane, OBE, QHS, MD, (38185), late Royal Army Medical Corps (now R.A.R.O.).
- Brigadier Cecil Raymond Nicholls, MBE, (56843), late Corps of Royal Engineers.
- Colonel (Honorary Brigadier) Bernard Leslie Rigby (269750), late Royal Army Educational Corps (now R.A.R.O.).
- Colonel (acting) Kenneth David Treasure, TD, DL, (53903), Army Cadet Force.
- Brigadier Casimir Michael Grigg, MC, (1500), Officer Commanding, Northern Rhodesia Army. (Dated 23 October 1964).

Royal Air Force

- Air Commodore Albert Donald Jackson.
- Air Commodore John Ernest Allen-Jones, OBE.
- Group Captain Ronald Berry, DSO, OBE, DFC.
- Group Captain John Campbell, AFC.
- Group Captain Donald Napier Corbyn.
- Group Captain George Frederick Corden.
- Group Captain Robert Winston Jackson.
- Group Captain Edward Lawley McMillan, AFC.
- Group Captain Basil William Parsons, DFC, AFC.
- Group Captain Desmond Gerard Heath Spencer, MBE.
- Group Captain Alexander McKay Sinclair Steedman, DFC.

Civil Division

- Harold Norman Gwynne Allen, Deputy Chairman and Joint Managing Director, W. H. Allen Sons & Company, Ltd, Bedford.
- James Anderson, MBE. For services to technical education and industrial training in Scotland.
- Richard Alford Banks, Chairman, Industrial Training Council, lately Director, Imperial Chemical Industries, Ltd.
- Frank Herbert Barlow. For political services.
- George Douglas Hutton Bell, Director, Plant Breeding Institute, Trumpington, Cambridge.
- Alderman Helen Caroline Bentwich. For political and public services in North London.
- Raymond William Birch, Executive Director, British Electric Traction Company Ltd. Chairman, Potteries Motor Traction Company Ltd.
- Alderman William Edmund Body. For political and public services in Hull City.
- Peter Stephen Paul Brook, Producer. Co-Director, Royal Shakespeare Theatre.
- John Francis Brown, Assistant Solicitor, Board of Trade.
- John Thornton Calvert, Partner, John Taylor & Sons, Consulting Engineers.
- Robert Laidlaw Scott Carswell, TD, Headmaster, Boroughmuir Secondary School, Edinburgh.
- Henry Chisholm, Chairman, Corby Development Corporation.
- Alderman Harold Chorlton. For political and public services in Rochdale.
- Ronald Paton Cooke, TD, Assistant Secretary, Ministry of Public Building and Works.
- William Sydney Charles Copeman, OBE, TD, MD, FRCP, President (formerly Chairman), Empire Rheumatism Council.
- Lieutenant-Colonel Sir Richard Charles Geers Cotterell, Bt., TD, lately Forestry Commissioner and lately Chairman, Forestry Commission English National Committee.
- Hugh Brechin Craigie, MB, FRCP (Ed.), Principal Medical Officer, Scottish Home and Health Department.
- James Crooks, Assistant Secretary, Land Drainage Division, Ministry of Agriculture, Fisheries and Food.
- John Owen Fisher Davies, MD, MRCP, Senior Administrative Medical Officer, Oxford Regional Hospital Board.
- Colin Rex Davis, Principal Conductor, Sadler's Wells.
- Donald Isaac Edwards, OBE, Editor, News and Current Affairs, British Broadcasting Corporation.
- Brigadier Claude Cyril Fairweather, OBE, TD, JP, DL, Chairman, Territorial and Auxiliary Forces Association for the North Riding of Yorkshire.
- Patrick Fallon, Higher Collector, Board of Customs and Excise.
- Alderman Francis Dashwood Farley, JP, Chairman, Warwickshire Police Authority.
- Charles Harington Gordon Forbes, OBE, lately Registrar, Principal Probate Registry, Supreme Court of Judicature.
- Hyman Frazer, Headmaster, Gateway Boys' School, Leicester.
- Richard Henry Fry, Financial Editor, The Guardian.
- Clifford James Fuller, MD, FRCP, Consultant Physician, Exeter.
- John William Gardner, Assistant Director (Lands), Ministry of Public Building and Works.
- Dorothy Annie Elizabeth Garrod, lately Disney Professor of Archaeology, University of Cambridge.
- Alderman Norman Gratton, JP. For political and public services in Derbyshire.
- Reginald Ernest Griffiths, Employers' Secretary and Joint Secretary, National Joint Industrial Councils for Local Authorities.
- George Hall. For political and public services in Newcastle-upon-Tyne.
- Douglas William Hill, Director of Research, The Cotton Silk and Man-made Fibres Research Association (Shirley Institute).
- Percy Herbertson Hogg, Chairman of Directors, John Haig & Company Ltd.
- George Hubert Hough, Technical Director, Hawker Siddeley Dynamics Ltd.
- Charles Edward Hubbard, OBE, Deputy-Director, Royal Botanic Gardens, Kew.
- Thomas Edward Hutton, Divisional Road Engineer, South Eastern Division, Ministry of Transport.
- Elizabeth Mary Kemp-Jones, Chief Insurance Officer, Ministry of Pensions and National Insurance.
- Professor Frank Llewellyn-Jones, lately Chairman, Central Advisory Council (Wales).
- Professor Gwyn Jones, Chairman, Welsh Committee of the Arts Council of Great Britain.
- Denys Louis Lasdun, MBE, Architect.
- Ian Wyllie Lawson, Chairman and Managing Director, James Templeton & Co. Ltd, Glasgow. For services to export.
- Leslie William Thomas Leete, MBE. Chief Officer, London Fire Brigade.
- Alexander McDonald, Secretary, Institution of Civil Engineers.
- Robert MacDonald, Procurator Fiscal, Glasgow.
- George Roy Buchanan MacGill, General Manager, Cumbernauld Development Corporation.
- Maitland Mackie. For services to agriculture and education in Aberdeenshire.
- Thomas Edward Mahir, GM, Assistant Commissioner, Metropolitan Police.
- Arthur Charles Main, Chairman, Central Conference Committee, Engineering Employers Federation.
- George John Malcolm, Harpsichordist.
- Alderman Frank Mansell, BEM. For political and public services in Wolverhampton.
- Allan James Marr, Chairman and Managing Director, Sir James Laing & Sons Ltd, Shipbuilders.
- Richard D'Arcy Marriott, DFC, Assistant Director of Sound Broadcasting, British Broadcasting Corporation.
- Samuel Vandeleur Christie-Miller, DL, Chairman, Wiltshire County Council.
- Eric Charles Mobbs, OBE, Professor of Forestry, University College of North Wales, Bangor.
- Claus Adolf Moser, Professor of Social Statistics, London School of Economics and Political Science, University of London.
- Thomas Gerald Pickavance, Director, Rutherford High Energy Laboratory.
- Chaim Raphael, OBE, Head of Information Division, HM Treasury.
- John David Spencer Rawlinson, OBE, Deputy Commissioner (Deputy Chief Scientific Officer), Civil Service Commission.
- Andrew Rintoul, Deputy Chairman, Trustee Savings Banks Association.
- Francis Gabriel Joseph Roberts, Principal Executive Officer, Foreign Office.
- George Henry Roland Rogers, M.P, Member of Parliament for North Kensington since 1945. A Lord Commissioner of HM Treasury since October 1964. For political and public services.
- Maurice Herbert Rossington, Assistant Secretary, Ministry of Health.
- Professor Joseph Rotblat, Secretary, Pugwash Committee.
- Alexander John Buckley Rutherford, Chief Commoner, City of London.
- Edward Spencer Shew, Political Correspondent, Exchange Telegraph Company Ltd. Honorary Secretary, Parliamentary Lobby Journalists' Association.
- Hubert Shirley-Smith, OBE, formerly Engineer-in-Charge, Forth Road Bridge.
- Francis Theodore Sobey, OBE, MC, Chairman, Wool Textile Delegation.
- Archibald Graham Steavenson. For political and public services in Southampton.
- Arthur William Suddaby, MBE, lately President, British Trawlers' Federation.
- Mildred Sylvester. For political and public services in Normanton.
- Andrew James Taylor, Director of Manufacture, Ford Motor Company Ltd.
- Edwin Windle Taylor, MRCS, LRCP, Director of Water Examination, Metropolitan Water Board.
- Francis John Enoch Tearle, Managing Director, Associated Electrical Industries (Overseas) Ltd. For services to export.
- Alderman Philip George Templeman, Chairman, Wessex Regional Hospital Board.
- Alfred John Townsend, Director, Institute of Export. For services to export.
- Allan Miles Ward, Principal, Sir John Cass College, London.
- Anthony Heriot Watson, Chief Statistician, Ministry of Aviation (now Chief Statistician, Ministry of Transport).
- Alderman Harry Watton, JP. For political and public services in Birmingham.
- Denis Edward Wheeler, Managing Director, Wellcome Foundation Ltd.
- Walter Widdas, HM Divisional Inspector of Mines and Quarries, Northern Division, Ministry of Power.
- William Albert Wilkins, MP, Member of Parliament for Bristol South since 1945. For political and public services.
- Frank Wilkinson, Board Member for Marketing, National Coal Board.
- Percy Theodore Williams, Director of Naval Contracts, Ministry of Defence (Navy).
- Norman Wood, Deputy Chairman, Board of the British Travel & Holidays Association.
- Arthur Joseph Wrigley, MD, FRCS, Consultant Obstetrician, St. Thomas' Hospital, London.
- John Kenneth Blackwell, lately Her Majesty's Consul-General, Hanoi.
- Ralph Allen Daniell, OBE, Counsellor (Commercial), Her Majesty's Embassy, Cairo.
- Bengt Thorsten Lindahl, British subject resident in Rome.
- John Owen Lloyd, Her Majesty's Consul-General, Osaka.
- Alan Edward Medlycott, British subject resident in Kuwait.
- James William Norton, British subject resident in Iran.
- Robert Antony Clinton-Thomas, Counsellor, Her Majesty's Embassy, Oslo.
- Stanley Frank Bailey, Under-Secretary, Ministry of Commerce and Industry, Kenya.
- Walter Beadon Banks. For services to the British community in Pakistan.
- Professor Cecil Wilfrid Luscombe Bevan, Deputy Vice-Chancellor, University of Ibadan, Nigeria.
- Derek William Bigley, OBE, Controller of Immigration, Malaysia.
- Mabel Irene, Lady Coles, of Mount Eliza, State of Victoria. For social welfare and charitable services.
- Cyril John Connell, Registrar, University of Queensland, State of Queensland.
- Herbert Balfour John Dugmore. For public services in Southern Rhodesia.
- David Fleming. For services to the commercial production of oil in Nigeria.
- Ernest James Hazell. For services to the community in the State of New South Wales.
- James Ian Husband, Labour Commissioner, Kenya.
- Robert Allan Powell Johnson, Director of Public Works, State of New South Wales.
- Ethleen Bridges King, of Toorak, State of Victoria. For social welfare services.
- Francis Desmond McGrath, Administrative Officer, Staff Grade, Western Nigeria.
- Donald Alexander MacLeod, Executive Director, Bank of West Africa Ltd, Nigeria.
- Edward Gerard MacMahon, MB, FRCS, of Sydney, State of New South Wales. For services to medicine.
- Donald Bernard Partridge, Administrative Officer, Class 1, Mid-West Region, Nigeria.
- Henry William Povey, OBE, Deputy Chairman and Managing Director, Uganda Electricity Board.
- Clarence Oscar Ferrero Rieger, MB, FRCS (Ed.), of Adelaide, State of South Australia. For services to the community.
- Brenda Mary, Lady Rogers, formerly Deputy President, Kenya Red Cross.
- Frederic Whalley Sansome, Professor of Botany, Ahmadu Bello University, Zaria, Northern Nigeria.
- George Anthony Theodore Shaw, State Secretary, State of Sarawak.
- Morris Skilleter, MBE, Director of Audit, Northern Nigeria.
- Kenneth Tomalin Watson, Chief Engineer, Ministry of Works, Northern Nigeria.
- Professor Fergus Brunswick Wilson, MBE, Dean of the Faculty of Agriculture, Makerere University College, Uganda. For public services.
- Henry Joseph Windsor, MB, FRCS, of Brisbane, State of Queensland. For services to medicine.
- Charles William Lynn, MBE, Chairman, Natural Resources Board, Northern Rhodesia. (Dated 23 October 1964).
- Stopford Henry Brooke-Norris, Editor, The Northern News, Northern Rhodesia. (Dated 23 October 1964).
- John Thomson, OBE. For public services in Northern Rhodesia. (Dated 23 October 1964).
- Thomas William Farrington, JP. For public services in the Cayman Islands.
- Rahman Baccus Gajraj, JP, Speaker of the Legislative Assembly, British Guiana.
- Bernard Trimingham Gosling, JP. For public services in Bermuda.
- William Charles Goddard Knowles. For public services in Hong Kong.
- Kwan Cho-yiu, OBE. For public services in Hong Kong.
- Evangel Howard Murcott, MB, CB, Chief Medical Officer, Ministry of Health, Bahamas.
- George Herbert Robins, MBE, Commissioner of Police, Bermuda.
- James Gordon Rodger, Director of Education, Fiji.

==== Officer of the Order of the British Empire (OBE) ====
Military Division

Royal Navy

- Commander Geoffrey Ellis Baker, DSC.
- Surgeon Commander James Cox, MB, BS.
- Commander James Barr Currie, VRD, Royal Naval Reserve.
- Major Roderick Jarvis Ephraums, Royal Marines.
- Commander Ronald Arthur Foster.
- Commander Arthur Ernest Godden, DSC.
- Commander James William Kelly, DSC.
- Commander Patrick David Henley Moreton, DSC, Nigerian Navy.
- Lieutenant Commander Alastair Hugh Garnet Murray.
- Reverend Julian James Andrew Newman.
- Commander James Ralph Pardoe.
- Colonel John Farleigh Parsons, MC, Royal Marines.
- Commander Basil Devereux Ridley.
- Commander John Loftus Rigge.
- Lieutenant Commander (Acting Commander) William Basil Willett, DSC.

Army

- Brevet and Temporary Lieutenant-Colonel Arthur John Archer, MBE, (323707), The Devonshire and Dorset Regiment.
- Lieutenant-Colonel William Hodson Atkins (118397), Royal Regiment of Artillery.
- Lieutenant-Colonel (Staff Paymaster, 1st Class) Stanley George Banks (138030), Royal Army Pay Corps.
- Lieutenant-Colonel (Brevet Colonel) Robert Victor Blott, TD, (124517), Berkshire and Westminster Dragoons, Royal Armoured Corps, Territorial Army (now T.A.R.O.).
- Brevet and Temporary Lieutenant-Colonel Edwin Noel Westby Bramall, MC, (277408), 2nd Green Jackets, The King's Royal Rifle Corps.
- Lieutenant-Colonel Ludford Robert Docker, MC, TD, (66809), The Royal Warwickshire Fusiliers.
- Lieutenant-Colonel Jack Bertie Dye, MC, (148868), The Royal Anglian Regiment.
- Lieutenant-Colonel (now Colonel) Warren Philip Ferrier (69121), Corps of Royal Military Police.
- Lieutenant-Colonel Donald Urquhart Fraser, MBE, (219837), The Royal Anglian Regiment (Employed List 1).
- Lieutenant-Colonel John Aloysius Joseph Higgins (284742), Royal Army Service Corps.
- Lieutenant-Colonel Anthony George Hogg (109927), Royal Regiment of Artillery.
- Lieutenant-Colonel (now Colonel (acting)) Joseph Basil Johnson, TD, (162874), Royal Regiment of Artillery, Territorial Army.
- Lieutenant-Colonel Peter George Marshall Litton (95634), The Sherwood Foresters (Nottinghamshire and Derbyshire Regiment).
- Lieutenant-Colonel Douglas Sam Lucas (74526), late Royal Regiment of Artillery (now R.A.R.O.).
- Lieutenant-Colonel (now Colonel) Hector Lachlan Rauthmell Macneal, TD, (308437), Staff, Territorial Army.
- Lieutenant-Colonel Harold Neville McIntyre, MC, (277967), Corps of Royal Engineers.
- Lieutenant-Colonel (now Colonel) John Howard Neale, MC, (179486), Staff, Territorial Army.
- Lieutenant-Colonel John Geoffrey Palmer, MBE, MC, (85502), Royal Regiment of Artillery.
- Lieutenant-Colonel (acting) James Kenneth Porter (148168), Army Cadet Force.
- Lieutenant-Colonel (temporary) Thomas Ian Ronald (108242), Royal Corps of Signals.
- Lieutenant-Colonel (Honorary) George John Shergold (162966), Royal Regiment of Artillery (Employed List 3) (now Retired).
- Lieutenant-Colonel (now Colonel (temporary)) Denis Story Sole, MBE, (73140), The King's Own Royal Border Regiment.
- Lieutenant-Colonel Alan Charles Llewellyn Sperling, MBE, MC, (176020), Royal Army Educational Corps.
- Lieutenant-Colonel Patrick Dehany Francis Thursby (235543), The Parachute Regiment, The Parachute Corps.
- Lieutenant-Colonel Emerson Moir Turnbull, MBE, (204255), The Life Guards.
- Lieutenant-Colonel John Vevers (257633), Corps of Royal Electrical and Mechanical Engineers.
- Lieutenant-Colonel Henry Blackwood Hallowes Waring, MBE, (121060), The Queen's Own Buffs, The Royal Kent Regiment.
- Lieutenant-Colonel (acting) David Ramsay Courtenay West, TD, (184779), Combined Cadet Force.
- Lieutenant-Colonel James Roy Anderson (153258), The Royal Sussex Regiment (Employed List 1); on loan to the Government of Kenya.
- Lieutenant-Colonel Norman Gourlay Jardine, Commander, 1st Battalion, Royal Rhodesia Regiment (Territorial), Southern Rhodesia.
- Lieutenant-Colonel Thomas Bell Maxwell Lamb (200402), Queen's Own Highlanders (Seaforth and Camerons) (Employed List 1); on loan to the Government of Malaysia.
- Lieutenant-Colonel Donald Ian Mitchell, Southern Rhodesia Army.
- Lieutenant-Colonel John Wesley Pearson (203343), The Royal Welch Fusiliers (Employed List 1); on loan to the Government of Malaysia.
- Lieutenant-Colonel Anthony Almroth Shirley Fawssett, MBE, (1502), 1st Battalion, The Northern Rhodesia Regiment. (Dated 23 October 1964).
- Lieutenant-Colonel John Brownlow Tucker, TD, Commanding Officer, Bermuda Local Forces.

Royal Air Force

- Group Captain Philip Edwin Stableford, Royal Rhodesian Air Force.
- Wing Commander John Derrick Beresford, (116800).
- Wing Commander William Thomas Bussey, MVO, BEM, (53816).
- Wing Commander John Gilbert Cooper, DFC, (112371).
- Wing Commander Keith Roy John de Belder, MB, BS, (502613).
- Wing Commander Edgar Evans (124786).
- Wing Commander Ellis Rhys Griffiths, MB, BS, (501741).
- Wing Commander John Harvey (46675).
- Wing Commander David Graeme Muspratt Hills, MB, BS, (501300).
- Wing Commander Henry Martyn Hughes (73238).
- Wing Commander Walter Dickens Hunter (49447).
- Wing Commander Thomas William Albert Hutton, DFC, (124855).
- Wing Commander Frederick Henry Peter Lewer (49900).
- Wing Commander John Douglas Palmer, MBE, (501034).
- Wing Commander William Henry Pope (127183).
- Wing Commander Desmond Patrick Singleton (31246).
- Wing Commander Thomas Stafford (128087).
- Wing Commander William Stapleton (41078), (Retired).
- Wing Commander John Harris Irvine Stirling (62350), (Retired).
- Wing Commander (Acting Group Captain) Frederick Joseph Trollope, MC, (68965).
- Squadron Leader Jack Raymond Shepherd, DFC, (100575).

Civil Division

- James Christie Strath Aberdein, Superintending Technical Officer, Ministry of Public Building and Works.
- Paul William Judson Addis, Chairman, London Regional Industrial Advisory Committee, National Savings Committee.
- Robina Scott Addis, Deputy General Secretary, National Association for Mental Health.
- Harry Birkett Allan, MRCVS, Regional Veterinary Officer, Ministry of Agriculture, Fisheries and Food.
- James Mill Anderson, Controller, Scotland, National Assistance Board.
- James Clifford Arthur, MRCS, LRCP, General Medical Practitioner, Gateshead.
- Henry Atkinson, Director, J. Marr & Son, Ltd, for services to the fishing industry at Fleetwood.
- Alderman Mark Revis Barber. For political and public services in Bradford City.
- Lois Eileen Beaulah, lately Principal, Midwife Teachers' Training College, Kingston Hill.
- John Bell, Higher Collector, Belfast, Board of Customs and Excise.
- Leslie Ewart Bickel, lately Honorary Treasurer, now Vice-President, National Federation of Music Societies.
- John Blachford, Senior Engineer Superintendent, Blue Star Line Ltd.
- William James Blanch, Senior Inspector of Taxes, Board of Inland Revenue.
- John Thomas Bolas, MBE, JP, Trade Union Vice-Chairman, Midland Regional Board for Industry.
- Wilfred Readman Bonas, Headmaster, Scalby County Secondary School, North Riding of Yorkshire.
- Samuel Boyce, JP, Alderman, West Ham County Borough.
- William Frederick Brazener, JP, lately Chairman, now Director, of the Mint, Birmingham.
- Harry Brumitt, Clerk of Seaton Valley Urban District Council, Northumberland.
- Dorothea Elizabeth, Lady Brunner, JP, Chairman, Keep Britain Tidy Group.
- Trevor Revera Bryant, MB, BCh, JP, General Medical Practitioner, Tredegar, Monmouthshire.
- Henry James Bucknell, Engineer Grade I, Inspectorate of Fighting Vehicles and Mechanical Equipment, Ministry of Defence (Army).
- Herbert Horace Butcher, lately Secretary, Foreign Compensation Commission, Foreign Office.
- Theodore Charles Annesley Butcher, Senior Legal Assistant, Ministry of Pensions and National Insurance.
- Stanley John Buxton, Chairman, Nottinghamshire Agricultural Executive Committee.
- Sidney Thomson Campbell, Secretary of the Home Timber Merchants' Association of Scotland.
- John Candia, President, London Fruit & Vegetable Trades' Federation Ltd.
- Norah Margaret Chown, Director, Reference Division, Central Office of Information.
- Arthur Valentine Cleaver, Chief Engineer (Rocket Propulsion), Rolls-Royce Ltd, Derby.
- Olivia Elsie Sarah Isabel Cockett, lately Principal, Ministry of Public Building and Works.
- Alderman Margaret Isabel Cole. For political and public services.
- Harold Herbert James Cutler, lately Assistant Clerk of the Peace, Hampshire.
- Hywel Davies, Head of Welsh Programmes, British Broadcasting Corporation.
- Humphrey Augustine Arthington-Davy, MBE, Principal, Commonwealth Relations Office.
- John Charles Davy, Science Correspondent, The Observer.
- Lieutenant-Commander Oswald Manuel Blaxland De Las Casas, DSC, Secretary and Aide-de-Camp to the Lieutenant Governor of Jersey.
- David Seymour Downs. For services to the Judicial Committee of the Privy Council.
- William Embleton, Vice-Principal and Head of the Marine and Mechanical Engineering Department, South Shields Marine and Technical College.
- Herbert Vandrell Evans, Chairman, Leeds Industrial Savings Sub-Committee.
- John Samuel Foggett, District Member for Liverpool Savings Committee.
- Charles Frederick Fryer, Chief Executive Officer, Department of Scientific and Industrial Research.
- John Escott Gabb, MRCS, LRCP, Medical Officer (Research), Royal Air Force Institute of Aviation Medicine, Ministry of Defence (Air).
- Charles James Garnsworthy, JP. For political and public services in Surrey.
- Alderman Frank Garstang, JP. For political and public services in North-West Lancashire and Cheshire.
- Arthur Ernest William Gaston, MBE, Head of General Department and Deputy Establishment Officer, Crown Agents for Oversea Governments and Administrations.
- Nigel Lidgett Gibbs, DFM, JP, Chairman, No. 1 Welsh Wing, Air Training Corps.
- Archibald Dunlap Gibson, JP, DL, Chairman, Armagh County Council.
- Fred Jay Girling, Principal Officer, East of Scotland Marine Survey District, Ministry of Transport.
- Andrew Frederick Sandeman Gordon, Engineering Inspector, Scottish Development Department.
- Noreen Mary Grace, Chief Executive Officer, Foreign Office.
- Archibald Graham, Head of Advertising Control, Independent Television Authority.
- Charles Stuart Gray, Technical Director, British Constructional Steelwork Association.
- Cyril Sidney Willis Grice, MBE, Principal Scientific Officer, Safety in Mines Research Establishment, Sheffield, Ministry of Power.
- Charles Bayne Grieve, MB, CB, General Medical Practitioner, Aberdeen.
- Keith Grimble Groves, JP. For services to the Royal Air Force.
- Robert Henry Haigh, JP, Chairman, Mexborough Local Employment Committee and Youth Employment Committee.
- Major Sydney Joseph Harvey, Chief Constable, Birkenhead.
- Henry MacLeod Havergal, Principal, Royal Scottish Academy of Music.
- Norman Hawkins, Principal Station Radio Officer, Government Communications Headquarters.
- James Bremner Henderson, Honorary President, Old Age Pensioners' Club, Coatbridge, Lanarkshire.
- Arthur Henshaw, Head Postmaster, Coventry.
- Major Lionel Godfrey Hitching, TD, LDS, Senior Dental Officer, Ministry of Health.
- Frank Bedo Hobbs, MD, MRCP, General Medical Practitioner, Farnham, Surrey.
- David Alexander Hogg, Borough Treasurer, Hammersmith.
- Charles Alfred Howell, Labour Member of Parliament for Perry Barr Division of Birmingham 1955-1964. For political and public services.
- Percy Hughes, Chairman, Worcestershire Agricultural Executive Committee.
- William Bristow Hunt, Senior Chief Executive Officer, Ministry of Defence (Central Staff).
- John Hunter, lately Director, Rose Brothers (Gainsborough) Ltd.
- Harold Frederick Innocent, Senior Mechanical and Electrical Engineer, Ministry of Public Building and Works.
- Alderman Lilian Alberta Irons, JP. For political and public services in Romford.
- Charles Henry James. For political and public services in Pontypridd.
- Barbara Mary Jefford, Actress.
- Captain John Robert Jeffrey, Chairman, British Air Line Pilots' Association.
- Cyril Vincent Jenkins, JP, Chairman, Long Grove Hospital Management Committee, Epsom, Surrey.
- Captain William Jefferson Johnson, MVO, Training Manager, Flight Operations Department, British European Airways Corporation.
- David John Jones, Higher Collector, London South, Board of Customs and Excise.
- John William Edmunds Jones, BEM, Chief Officer, Glamorgan Fire Brigade.
- Philip Edmund Jones, Deputy Keeper of the Records, Guildhall Library, London.
- Alderman Thomas Henry Joyce, For political and public services in Edmonton.
- Kathirkamathamby Kandiah, Group Leader, Instrumentation for Physics Research Group, Electronics Division, Atomic Energy Research Establishment, Harwell.
- Miriam Kaplowitch, MBE. For voluntary social services in Nottingham and district.
- John Arthur Karran, AFC, Deputy Director (Operations), Flight Safety Directorate, Ministry of Aviation.
- Richard Frederick William Keay, Director of Production Engineering, Vickers-Armstrongs (Engineers) Ltd.
- George Paul Kerr, County Inspector, Royal Ulster Constabulary.
- Alderman Horace Harold Kimber, lately Chairman, Parliamentary Committee, National Grocers' Federation.
- Catherine Elizabeth Margaret Kingan. For public services in County Down.
- Thomas Kirk, Chief Engineer, RMS Queen Mary, Cunard Steam-Ship Company Ltd.
- Marshall George Edwin Lambert, Line Manager, British Railways Board.
- Cecil Austen Layard, Assistant General Manager, Home Service, Navy, Army, and Air Force Institutes.
- Douglas Charles Lee, Senior Chief Executive Officer, HM Treasury.
- Muriel Ivy Lee, Chief Press Officer, Board of Trade.
- Lola Beatrice Lewis, MBE, Regional Administrator, North West Region, Women's Voluntary Service.
- Robert Alexander Lillie. For services to modern Scottish art.
- Frederick Limb, Chairman, Nottingham and District Productivity Committee.
- Alexander Roger Logan, Principal Inspector of Taxes, Board of Inland Revenue.
- John Clulow Loyd, Principal Architect, Department of Education and Science.
- James Frank Lyne, Chairman, Management Side, Whitley Council for Health Service, Professional and Technical Staffs, Group B.
- James McAulay, Chief Constable, Paisley Burgh Police.
- Catherine McLeod McCallum, lately Principal Educational Psychologist, Glasgow Education Authority.
- John Kenneth MacDonald, DFC, Principal Officer, Ministry of Education for Northern Ireland.
- James McDonaugh, Director, Specialist Tours Department, British Council.
- Arnold Machin, Sculptor.
- James Ian Mackay, lately Grade 2 Officer (Assistant Regional Controller), Ministry of Labour.
- Ian Alexis Gordon MacQueen, MD, Medical Officer of Health, City of Aberdeen.
- Lieutenant-Colonel Duncan McSwein, JP, Honorary Treasurer and Past President, Scottish Amateur Athletic Association.
- The Reverend Canon William Marsden, Chairman, Cockermouth Rural District Council, Cumberland.
- Ralph Warren Marsh, Assistant Director, Agricultural and Horticultural Research Station, Long Ashton, University of Bristol.
- Noel Henry Mason, Principal Scientific Officer, Directorate of Materials and Structures Research and Development, Ministry of Aviation.
- Donald Matheson, HM Senior Chemical Inspector of Factories, Ministry of Labour.
- Glyn Arthur Mathias. For political and public services in Glamorgan.
- Frank Mayo, Industrial Development Adviser, Board of Esso Petroleum Company Ltd.
- Alfred Kenneth Meggitt, Chairman, City of Coventry Savings Committee.
- Joseph Mellick, Solicitor, Glasgow. For services in relation to Legal Aid.
- James Edward Melville, Chief Executive Officer, Ministry of Defence (Navy).
- Edith Olive Mercer, MBE, Principal, Ministry of Overseas Development.
- Mona Ross Mitchell. For political and public services in Brighouse.
- Alderman Joseph Henry Moore. For political and public services in Dorset.
- Captain Peter Smith Morrison, Master, MV City of Khartoum, Ellerman Lines Ltd.
- Alice Unwin Muxlow, Chairman, Northamptonshire County Council Health Committee.
- Alderman Keith Needham, JP, DL, Chairman, Shropshire Civil Defence Committee.
- Albert Edward Newell, Secretary, Welsh Hospital Board.
- William Michael O'Leary, MBE, Chairman, South Middlesex and District War Pensions Committee.
- Muriel Edith Orsman, JP, lately Senior Mistress and Geography Mistress, Porth County School for Girls, Glamorgan.
- Cyril Leslie Page, Assistant Controller, Television Administration, British Broadcasting Corporation.
- William John Henry Palfrey, Deputy Chief Constable, Lancashire Constabulary.
- Thomas Paterson, JP. For political and public services in Ayr.
- William Pickles, HM Inspector of Schools, Wales, Department of Education and Science.
- Dorothy Annie Plastow, Assistant Education Officer, London County Council.
- Alderman Hugh Platt, JP. For political and public services in Birkenhead.
- Marjorie Anne Pollard. For services to sport and in particular Hockey.
- Herbert Powell, Secretary, Football Association of Wales.
- Wing Commander Philip Charles Price, AFC, Wing Commander (Training), Headquarters Air Cadets, White Waltham, Ministry of Defence (Air).
- Brynhild Catherine Jervis-Read, Director, Joint Committee of the Order of St. John and British Red Cross Society Ex-Services War Disabled Help Department.
- Sydney Reeves, Chief Executive Officer, Ministry of Pensions and National Insurance.
- Frank Reid, lately National Industrial Officer, National Union of General and Municipal Workers.
- Professor Leopold John Dixon Richardson, lately Joint Honorary Secretary, The Classical Association.
- Colonel Thomas Arnold Roberts, MBE, TD, DL, Member, Territorial and Auxiliary Forces Association for the County of Surrey.
- Henry Rothenberg, Joint Managing Director, James North & Sons Ltd. For services to export.
- Captain Charles Nelson Meredith Rountree, MBE, Chairman, County Tyrone Savings Committee.
- John Sanderson, British Council Representative, Sierra Leone.
- Raymond Harold Sandifer, Assistant Chief Designer, Structures, Handley Page, Ltd.
- Cecily Mary Strode Saunders, MB, BS, Honorary Physician, St. Joseph's Hospice, Hackney.
- George William Shaw, Director, The Bowater Paper Corporation, Ltd.
- Arthur John Shove, lately Senior Assistant Clerk, London County Council.
- Adam Gordon Skinner, HM Inspector of Schools (Higher Grade), Scottish Education Department.
- Charles Leonard Smith, Principal Examiner, Board of Trade.
- Thomas Hall Smith, MBE, Chairman, The Lothians War Pensions Committee.
- Phyllis Stedman. For political and public services in Peterborough.
- Henry Steel, Senior Legal Assistant, Colonial Office.
- Alderman James Wilfred Sterland, MBE, JP. For political and public services in Sheffield.
- Dorothy Scott Stokes, Chairman, National Insurance Local Tribunal for the Metropolitan area.
- Constance Irene Stuart, lately Chairman, Berkshire, Buckinghamshire and Oxfordshire Advisory Committee.
- Herbert Tayler, Architect.
- Charles Herbert Alderson Taylor, First Class Valuer, Board of Inland Revenue.
- Albert Victor Thomas, GM, HM Inspector of Fire Services, Home Office.
- Richard Blethyn Thomas, Member of Northern Ireland Tourist Board.
- Norman George Thompson, Director of Publications, HM Stationery Office.
- William John Edward Tobin, Staff Engineer, General Post Office.
- Alexander Cockburn Townsend, Librarian, British Museum (Natural History).
- Christian Johnston Tudhope, JP, Chairman, Dundee Executive Council, National Health Service.
- John Moncrieff Turner, Chairman, Finance Committee, Scottish Industries Exhibition.
- Arthur Joseph Victor Underwood, Chemical Engineer Consultant to the Ministry of Defence (Army).
- Arthur William Vale, District Auditor, Ministry of Housing and Local Government.
- Charles Walter Vickery, Chief Clerk, Official Solicitor's. Department, Supreme Court of Judicature.
- Stafford Vidler, Chief Property Adviser, Public Trustee Office.
- William Smith Waters, Land Commissioner, Cumberland and Westmorland, Ministry of Agriculture, Fisheries and Food.
- Frederick Watkinson, MM, JP, Vice-Chairman and Chairman of Finance Committee, Leeds Regional Hospital Board.
- Marion Augusta Watson, Principal Scientific Officer, Rothamsted Experimental Station, Harpenden, Hertfordshire.
- Alderman Mary Alexandra Watson, MB, CB. For political and public services in Berkshire.
- Ralph Hector Watson, Controller, Valuation Branch, Board of Customs and Excise.
- Rupert Gavin Chalmers-Watson. For services to the poultry industry.
- Ronald Alfred Wells, Deputy Chief Scientific Officer. Director, National Chemical Laboratory, Department of Scientific and Industrial Research.
- Lieutenant-Colonel Horace Westmorland. For services to Mountain Rescue in the Lake District.
- Lionel Frederick Wharton, JP, Labour Manager, Imperial Chemical Industries Ltd, Billingham.
- Edward Bartholomew White, Principal Lecturer, Royal Naval College, Greenwich, Ministry of Defence (Navy).
- William Whiteley, JP, Chairman and Managing Director, B. S. & W. Whiteley Ltd. For services to export.
- Leslie Alfred Wiles, JP, Principal Lecturer, The Royal Military College of Science, Shrivenham, Ministry of Defence (Army).
- Ernest Frank Williams, Chief Chemist, J. Sainsbury Ltd.
- Gwyneth Irene Williams, Councillor, Merthyr Tydfil County Borough.
- Kathleen Irene Anne Williams, Headmistress, Lanfranc Girls Secondary School, Croydon.
- Thomas George Williams, Resident Engineer, Atomic Energy Establishment, Winfrith.
- John Benjamin Parkin Williamson, Appointed (Independent) Member, Agricultural Wages Board for England and Wales.
- Norah May Woolger, MBE, Chief Executive Officer, Ministry of Transport.
- Richard Fenton Yates, Assistant Controller, Investigation Branch, General Post Office.
- Ruth Mary Chaplin, lately Third Secretary, Her Majesty's Embassy, Moscow.
- John Boyd Denson, First Secretary, Her Majesty's Embassy, Vientiane.
- Cecil Percy Durkin, lately British Vice-Consul, East London.
- Eric Stuart Jenkins, DSO, British subject resident in Kuwait.
- Marjorie Elizabeth Kirkland, National President of the Daughters of the British Empire in the United States.
- Alwyn John Manton, British subject resident in Belgium.
- George Owen McEntee, British Consul, Medellin.
- John McLeod, British subject lately resident in Indonesia.
- John Gordon McMinnies, lately First Secretary, British High Commission, Nairobi.
- Richard Lonzil Morris, lately First Secretary (Labour), Her Majesty's Embassy, Rio de Janeiro.
- The Reverend Prebendary Donald Wyndham Cremer Mossman, lately Anglican Chaplain of Zurich, Rural Dean of Switzerland.
- Arthur George Pye, British subject resident in Peru.
- William Campbell Reid, British subject resident in the Dominican Republic.
- Francis Harold Scarfe, Director, British Institute, Paris.
- Douglas Robert Arnold Spankie, lately First Secretary, Office of the British Charge d'Affaires, Peking.
- Charles Francis Spence, British subject resident in Mozambique.
- Robert Frederick Charles Thomae, British subject resident in the Argentine Republic.
- Edna Gwendoline Ayers, of North Adelaide, State of South Australia. For services to the community.
- George Montario Bedbrook, MB, FRCS. For services to the treatment and rehabilitation of paraplegics in the State of Western Australia.
- William Kerr Blackie, MD, CB, Honorary Consulting Physician, Salisbury Central Hospital, Southern Rhodesia.
- Richard Kennedy Bogle, City Electrical Engineer, Penang, Malaysia.
- The Reverend Canon Wilfrid Durnford Elvis Burne. For services in the field of education in Nigeria.
- Douglas James Calder, Deputy Accountant-General, Federal Ministry of Finance, Nigeria.
- Frederick Charles Cook, of East Malvern, State of Victoria. For public services.
- Norman John Coward, General Manager, Eastern Nigeria Marketing Board.
- Phillip Howard Davis, Adviser on Secondary Education, Federal Ministry of Education, Nigeria.
- John Deakin, Registrar, West African Examinations Council.
- Leslie Arthur Hamilton Dickens, TD. For services to the British community in Pakistan.
- Cyril Hopetoun Dickson, MB, BS, Medical Secretary, Branch in the State of Victoria of the Australian Medical Association.
- William Dobell, a portrait and landscape painter in the State of New South Wales.
- George Reuben Hughes Drew, MB, CB, Chief Health Officer, Western Nigeria.
- John Angus Dunning, Headmaster, Prince Alfred College, Adelaide, State of South Australia.
- John Leslie Gasteen. For his services to the cultural life of the State of Queensland.
- Antony Campbell Gowan. For services to the British community in Assam, India.
- Alan Richard Turner Greenwood, Treasurer of the Dental Board of the State of Victoria.
- Bernard Gunnery, Principal of the Cathedral and John Connon Schools, Bombay, India.
- John Felix Byng-Hall, Vice-Chairman, Kenya Dairy Board.
- George Mervyn Harries, Deputy Commissioner, British South Africa Police, Southern Rhodesia.
- George Richard Henderson, DFC, Deputy Director of Settlement, Kenya.
- John Cledwyn Hughes, Administrative Officer, Class II, Nigerian Public Service.
- George Arthur Hunt, JP, Mayor of St Arnaud, State of Victoria.
- John Lawrence Irwin, Brigadier, Salvation Army, Court and Prison Chaplain, Sydney, State of New South Wales.
- Emrys Thomas Jones. For services in connection with the commercial and industrial development of Kenya.
- Peter Antony Jones, Director, Coffee Research Station, Ruiru, Kenya.
- Ida Madge Kelsey, Chairman of the Students' Hostel Committee, The Victoria League.
- Oswald Theodore Kyle, MB. For services as a medical practitioner in the Huon district, State of Tasmania.
- Michael Charles Latham, MB, BCh, lately Chairman of the Board of Management, International School, Tanganyika.
- Royal William Evans Lewis, Assistant Director of Veterinary Services, Kenya.
- Councillor Ernest Wesley McCann, JP, of Geelong, State of Victoria. For services to local government and the community.
- Louisa McCombe, Brigadier, Salvation Army, State of Tasmania.
- William Fife McGladdery, LRCP, FRCS (Ed.), Senior Government Medical Officer, Gwelo, Southern Rhodesia.
- Hector James McPherson, MB, CB, Specialist Ophthalmologist, General Hospital, Kuala Lumpur, Malaysia.
- Thomas Henry Mooney, MBE, Assistant Commissioner, Royal Malaysia Police.
- George Terence Coldstream Morris, Director of Audit, Eastern Nigeria.
- Merna Alma Mueller, MB, BS, of Ceduna, State of South Australia. For services to the community.
- Mother Mary Neree, of Palm Island, State of Queensland. For social welfare services, particularly at the Fantome Island Leprosarium.
- Peter Norman Pearce, Deputy Principal Immigration Officer, Kenya.
- Antony Walter Peers, Assistant Director of Agriculture, Kenya.
- James Hartley Pinkerton, lately Controller of Telecommunications, Penang, Malaysia.
- James Gerard Preston, lately Controller of Telecommunications (Traffic), Malaysia.
- Marten Turner Read, MBE, MC, Acting Deputy Director of Medical Services' State of Sarawak.
- Howard Vincent Reilly. For services to Law in the State of Western Australia.
- John Adrian Reynolds, Administrative Officer, Group 6, Northern Nigeria.
- Michael Frederick Laud Robinson, Chairman of the Pyrethrum Board, Kenya.
- Fernley Gordon Rogers, Provincial Secretary, Kabba Province, Northern Nigeria.
- Anthony Gerald Saville, MBE. Administrative Officer, Staff Grade, Eastern Nigeria.
- Michael Victor Saville, Deputy Financial Secretary, State of Sabah.
- Reuben Francis Scarf. For charitable services in. the State of New South Wales.
- Victor Charles Schaefer, of Brisbane, State of Queensland. For services to cricket administration.
- Richard Turnbull Scott, Chief Engineer (Civil), Northern Nigeria.
- Ruth Mary Simpson, Head of the Department of Microbiology, University College Nairobi, Kenya.
- James Henry Evans Smart, MBE, Mayor's Secretary and Public Relations Officer, Nairobi City Council, Kenya.
- Frederick John Steggall, a leading member of the British community in Penang & Malaysia.
- Cedric Robert Arnold Stewart, lately Senior Administrator and Technical Adviser, Government Railways, State of Western Australia.
- Peter Michael Wand-Tetley, MC, lately Under-Secretary (Establishment), Ministry of Establishments and Training, Northern Nigeria.
- Hugh Thomas, Clerk of the House of Representatives, Kenya.
- Joseph Geoffrey Thompson, Director of Telecommunications, State of Singapore.
- Ian Gordon Thomson, MD, CB, Senior Medical Officer (Clinical), Northern Nigeria.
- Henry William Thornton. For services to local government in the State of New South Wales.
- Walter Astley Tyrrell, MBE. For services to the community in the State of New South Wales.
- Malcolm John Leggoe Uren, JP, a journalist and historian in the State of Western Australia.
- Harold Waller, Permanent Secretary for Establishments, Office of the Prime Minister, Uganda.
- Bruce Bownas Whittaker, Commissioner of Lands and Surveys, Uganda.
- Michael Hallawell Widdows, lately Deputy Controller of Works Services, Eastern Nigeria.
- Cyril Bernard Willman. For services to the British community in Kumasi, Ghana.
- Lieutenant-Colonel Henry George Baxter, Secretary, The Zambia Legion (lately known as the British Empire Service League), Northern Rhodesia.
- Julian Canning Day, Deputy Commissioner, Northern Rhodesia Police.
- Donald Anderson Lightfoot, Director of the Northern Rhodesia Broadcasting Corporation.
- Peter Temple Stuart Miller, of Lusaka, Northern Rhodesia. For public services.
- Colin Guy Champion Rawlins, DFC, Acting Resident Commissioner and Resident Secretary, Northern Rhodesia.
- Edgar Adolphus Adams, JP, Town Clerk, Georgetown Town Council, British Guiana.
- Alfred James Beeby, MBE, Member for Finance and Finance Secretary, Bechuanaland Protectorate.
- David Wallace Dunlop, Director of Audit, British Guiana.
- Leslie Jack Whitmore Fountain, DFC. For public services in Bermuda.
- Russell Stewart Grant. For public services in British Honduras.
- John Fraser Griffiths, Accountant-General, Fiji.
- Joseph James Gunn, MBE, Permanent Secretary, Ministry of Supreme Council Affairs, Federation of South Arabia.
- Guy Edward Charles Hudson. For public services in the Federation of South Arabia.
- Robert Bruce Ingleton. For public services in Fiji.
- Durward Knowles. For public services in the Bahamas.
- Li Yiu-bor, JP. For public services in Hong Kong.
- The Reverend Dennis James Moore, Vicar General to the Bishop of Southern Solomons, British Solomon Islands Protectorate.
- Salahuddeen Mansoor Ahmad Nasir, lately Commissioner of Title, British Guiana.
- Balbir Ball Greene Nehaul, MB, BS, Deputy Chief Medical Officer, Ministry of Labour, Health and Housing, British Guiana.
- Edward Dan Osborn, DFC, Controller of Income Tax, Swaziland.
- Neville Douglas Osborne, Assistant Financial Secretary, Barbados.
- Arthur Howell Pickwoad, Commissioner of Labour, British Solomon Islands Protectorate.
- Joffre John Robinson, Permanent Secretary, Ministry of Trade and Production, Dominica.
- Hubert John Sabben, Comptroller of Customs, Mauritius.
- The Reverend Harold Slater, Chairman and General Superintendent of the Methodist Church in the Bahamas.
- William Kirk Thomson, Registrar-General, Hong Kong.
- Peter Alan Lee Vine, VRD, JP. For public services in Hong Kong.
- Clyde Leopold Walcott. For services to cricket and sports generally in British Guiana.
- Walter James Williams, MVO, Director, Trade Development Board, Bermuda.
- Arthur Ernest Wiltshire, Commissioner of Police, Aden.
- Yeoh Guan-eng, MB, BS, Principal Medical and Health Officer, Hong Kong.
- Robin George Clive Young, Senior Adviser, Western Aden Protectorate.

==== Member of the Order of the British Empire (MBE) ====
Military Division

Royal Navy

- Lieutenant Commander Harold Jarvis Bradbury.
- Lieutenant (S.D.)(G) John Frederick Clegg.
- Lieutenant Commander Michael Neild Collis.
- Lieutenant Commander Eric Charles Day, DSC, (Retired).
- Instructor Lieutenant Commander William Edward John Golding.
- Supply Lieutenant Commander (C.A.) George Edward Griffin.
- Lieutenant (S.D.)(Reg) Knowling Hopson-Hill.
- First Officer Barbara Claire McIntyre, Singapore Women's Auxiliary Naval Service.
- Lieutenant Commander Martin Henry Packard.
- Mr. Jack Heron Paul, Royal Fleet Auxiliary Service.
- Lieutenant Commander Ian Tom David Riddell.
- Lieutenant Commander Arthur Roberts, VRD, Royal Naval Reserve.
- Captain John Reginald Derek Sears, Royal Marines.
- Lieutenant Commander Geoffrey James Sherman.
- Lieutenant (S.D.)(A.V.) Sidney Frank Turner.
- Lieutenant Commander (S.C.C.) Thomas Charles Yandell, Royal Naval Reserve.

Army

- Major Montague Frederick Atkinson (249018), Army Catering Corps.
- Major Ian Helstrip Baker (393064), Royal Tank Regiment, Royal Armoured Corps.
- 6967150 Warrant Officer Class I Leslie Joseph Barber, Royal Regiment of Artillery.
- Major Arthur Begg (220895), Royal Corps of Signals.
- Major (Quartermaster) William Harold Brant (425991), The Royal Welch Fusiliers.
- Major George Paul Richard Brewer (346418), Royal Army Educational Corps.
- Major (temporary) Geoffrey John Brierley (443405), The Parachute Regiment, The Parachute Corps.
- Major Michael Penry Bull (379456), Corps of Royal Engineers (now R.A.R.O.).
- Major Keith Burch (418208), The Royal Anglian Regiment.
- Major (acting) Sidney Francis Chalk, MC, (249012), Combined Cadet Force.
- Major (Quartermaster) Thomas Henry Cole (432670), The Queen's Royal Irish Hussars, Royal Armoured Corps.
- Captain (Quartermaster) Charles John Coles (451373), Royal Horse Guards (The Blues).
- Lieutenant Douglas Harold Cresswell (477256), Corps of Royal Electrical and Mechanical Engineers.
- Major (Q.G.O.) Dalbahadur Rai, MC, (388566), 7th Duke of Edinburgh's Own Gurkha Rifles.
- Major Arthur Rigg Edwards (7567), Royal Army Medical Corps, Territorial Army (now retired).
- Major (acting) Maxwell Dennis Embury (381861), Army Cadet Force.
- 19047651 Warrant Officer Class II Bernard Charles William Evans, Corps of Royal Engineers.
- Lieutenant-Colonel (local) Eric William Percy Evans (379629), Royal Regiment of Artillery.
- Major (acting) Lionel John Fiddaman (275596), Army Cadet Force.
- Major Colin Leonard Beauchamp Gillespie (337656), Corps of Royal Engineers.
- 21181172 Warrant Officer Class I Albert Whyte Ross Gracie, Royal Army Ordnance Corps.
- Major Bruce Meade Hamilton (365603), The Black Watch (Royal Highland Regiment).
- Major Brian David Heelis (368499), Corps of Royal Electrical and Mechanical Engineers.
- Major (now Lieutenant-Colonel (temporary)) Kevin Arthur Hill, MC, (228373), The Lancashire Fusiliers.
- Major John Harvey Johnson, TD, (105304), The Queen's Royal Surrey Regiment, Territorial Army.
- Captain (Quartermaster) William George Johnston, DCM, (446669), Irish Guards.
- Major Martin Hudson Jones (403507), The Parachute Regiment, The Parachute Corps.
- 2622197 Warrant Officer Class I George William Kirkham, Grenadier Guards.
- Major (acting) Austen Holland Mead, ERD, TD, (69810), Combined Cadet Force.
- Captain (Quartermaster) Charles Michie (451876), The Gordon Highlanders.
- Major (local) Alexander Konstantin Mineeff (369773), Intelligence Corps.
- Major (Paymaster) Auguste Maurice Mitchell, TD, (402058), Royal Army Pay Corps, Territorial Army.
- 22236156 Warrant Officer Class II Robert Beatty Moncur, Corps of Royal Engineers, Territorial Army.
- Major Guy William Naismith Obbard (400003), Corps of Royal Engineers.
- Major (Quartermaster) Richard Ward Pearson (356551), Royal Regiment of Artillery.
- Major Anthony Thirlwall Philipson (156065), Scots Guards.
- Major (Quartermaster) Tom Derby Purdam (440387), The King's Own Royal Border Regiment.
- 1878054 Warrant Officer Class I Gordon Ramsey, Corps of Royal Engineers.
- Major Robert Francis Richardson (408020), The Royal Scots (The Royal Regiment).
- Major Peter Gordon Roberson, TD, (354017), Royal Regiment of Artillery, Territorial Army.
- Major Adrian Dermot Rouse (366996), The Devonshire and Dorset Regiment.
- Major (Quartermaster) George Boyd Shaw, (432080), The Royal Scots Greys (2nd Dragoons), Royal Armoured Corps.
- Major (Quartermaster) William Charles Shipton (440432), The Queen's Own Hussars, Royal Armoured Corps.
- 14726502 Warrant Officer Class I Lesley Skinner, The Royal Scots (The Royal Regiment).
- Major Harry Reginald Antony Streather (384233), The Gloucestershire Regiment.
- 23473794 Warrant Officer Class I (Bandmaster) Edwin John Tamplin, Royal Corps of Signals, Territorial Army.
- Major Pamela Eugenie Gordon-Thompson, TD, (399858), Women's Royal Army Corps, Territorial Army.
- Captain Timothy Kenrick Thompson (445986), Royal Regiment of Artillery.
- Major Edward Kendall Thorneycroft, TD, (362056), 3rd Green Jackets, The Rifle Brigade, Territorial Army.
- Major (Quartermaster) Giuseppe Carmelo Antonio Vella (398978), Royal Malta Artillery.
- Major Douglas Allen Warren (341319), Royal Pioneer Corps.
- Major (Quartermaster) John Edward Webb (359639), Royal Army Service Corps (Employed List 2).
- Major Basil Rowan White, TD, (242829), Corps of Royal Engineers, Territorial Army.
- 1452537 Warrant Officer Class II Charles Joseph John White, Royal Tank Regiment, Royal Armoured Corps.
- Captain Joseph Williams (299688), Corps of Royal Electrical and Mechanical Engineers, Territorial Army.
- Major Henry Gabriel Woods, MC, (312522), 5th Royal Inniskilling Dragoon Guards, Royal Armoured Corps.
- Captain Arthur David Charlesworth (451347), Corps of Royal Engineers; formerly on loan to the Federal Republic of Nigeria.
- Major Patrick Joseph Evans (382536), Royal Corps of Signals; on loan to the Government of Malaysia.
- Major David Dyson Lister (319214), Corps of Royal Electrical and Mechanical Engineers; on loan to the Government of Malaysia.
- Major Garrison Engineer Charles John Luckett (422111), Corps of Royal Engineers; formerly serving with the British Joint Services Training Team, Ghana.
- Major Phillip Gwyn Lloyd Mitchley (277517), Corps of Royal Engineers; formerly on loan to the Government of Malaysia.
- Major Robert Neville Parker (375739), Royal Army Ordnance Corps; formerly on loan to the Government of the Federal Republic of Nigeria.
- Captain Nigel Ralph Pavitt (444495), The Royal Anglian Regiment; on loan to the Government of Kenya.
- Captain John Alan Reid Wilson, late Troop Commander, Nigerian Army Engineers.
- Captain Henry Andrew Eldridge (1855), 3rd Battalion, The Northern Rhodesia Regiment. (Dated 23 October 1964).
- Major Louis Carlton Martin, ED, British Guiana Volunteer Force.

Royal Air Force

- Squadron Leader Peter Raymond Browne (612959).
- Squadron Leader Nigel Vincent Delahunty Bunker, MB, BCh, (504014).
- Squadron Leader Hugh Guthrie Clark (194352).
- Squadron Leader Ernest Lewis Clarke (49927).
- Squadron Leader William Arthur Cummins (59135).
- Squadron Leader Brian Dickinson (2407914).
- Squadron Leader Robert Leonard Dunkley (55992).
- Squadron Leader John Lloyd Fellowes (58761).
- Squadron Leader Matthew Comrie Ferguson (573248).
- Squadron Leader James Stewart Goodwin (148560).
- Squadron Leader Ronald Hardy (2300839), RAF Regiment.
- Squadron Leader Lionel Richard Hay (45394).
- Squadron Leader Walter Vincent Holden (579470).
- Squadron Leader Michael O'Sullivan (53377), (Retired).
- Squadron Leader Edward Comer Rigg, AFC, (58563).
- Squadron Leader Barrie Rose (501030).
- Squadron Leader Ronald Percy Smith, Hong Kong Auxiliary Air Force.
- Squadron Leader Harry Stringer (512932).
- Acting Squadron Leader Arthur Robinson (160544), RAF Volunteer Reserve (Training Branch).
- Flight Lieutenant Peter John Alderton (575552).
- Flight Lieutenant Stanley Albert Booker (51872).
- Flight Lieutenant John Edward Crockett, MRCS, LRCP, (507375).
- Flight Lieutenant George Dack, DFC, (56931), (Retired).
- Flight Lieutenant Kenneth James Forbes (575617).
- Flight Lieutenant Patrick Lawrence Munro Hennessey (502938).
- Flight Lieutenant Charles Richard Palmer, AFC, (202753).
- Flight Lieutenant Robert William Raisbeck (173009).
- Flight Lieutenant Vincent Thomas Rollason (167463).
- Flight Lieutenant Donald Ryden (626942).
- Flight Lieutenant Denis Cleave Tayler (566830).
- Flight Lieutenant Leonard William White (579607).
- Acting Flight Lieutenant James Hulme (63302), RAF Volunteer Reserve (Training Branch).
- Warrant Officer George Robert Bourne (524710).
- Warrant Officer William Kenneth Cleave (547378).
- Warrant Officer Kenneth Henry Fahy (4001212.).
- Warrant Officer Robert Grierson (517411).
- Warrant Officer Joseph Harper (628191).
- Warrant Officer Leonard Albert Lintern, BEM, (591341).
- Warrant Officer Edward Mathewson Mills, BEM, (531866).
- Warrant Officer George Roffey (518929).
- Warrant Officer Henry Garth Swift (523088).
- Warrant Officer Reginald Harold Taylor (518122).
- Warrant Officer John Penning Ward (634567).
- Warrant Officer William Charles Welsh (628365).

Civil Division

- Janet Stevenson Abercromby, lately Superintendent Radiographer, Ayr County Hospital, Ayr.
- Archibald Fleming Alexander, General Secretary, Scottish Grocers' Federation.
- Margaret Jean Stewart Alexander, Clerical Officer (Secretary), Scottish Development Department.
- Albert George Edward Ames, Main Grade Quantity Surveyor, Ministry of Public Building and Works.
- Major Alexander Macgregor Anderson, DCM, MM. For services to the British Legion.
- William Edward Ansell, Chairman, Scunthorpe Industrial Savings Sub-Committee.
- Robert Archer, Higher Executive Officer, Ministry of Defence (Air).
- Frederick Duncan Atkinson, Superintending Inspector, Ministry of Defence (Air).
- Herbert Ernest Axell, Warden, Minsmere Bird Reserve, Suffolk.
- Thomas Anderson Ayres, Clerical Officer, Ministry of Pensions and National Insurance.
- Cyril Charles Baillie, Higher Executive Officer, General Post Office.
- Harold Baker, Works Manager, Samuel Taylor & Sons (Brierley Hill) Ltd, Staffordshire.
- William George Ball, JP. Chairman and Managing Director, Precision Products (Cumberland) Ltd.
- Robert Christian Banton, Maintenance Surveyor, Area Office, Warrington, Lancashire, Ministry of Public Building and Works.
- Joyce May Barber, Secretary and Housing Manager, Liverpool Improved Houses Ltd.
- Leonard Barley, Chief Design Engineer, Turbine Division, Ruston & Hornsby Ltd, Lincoln.
- Amy Louise Barnard, Matron, Chailey Heritage Hospital, Sussex.
- Edward Arthur Barnes, Lithographic Artist, HM Stationery Office.
- Joan Ansley Bartlett, Inspector of Taxes (Higher Grade), Board of Inland Revenue.
- Llewelyn Archer Bates, lately Senior Assistant Engineer, Construction Section, North Eastern Electricity Board.
- Frederick Battersby, Civilian Stores Officer, British Land Forces, Kenya, Ministry of Defence (Army).
- Frank Beardmore, JP, Chairman, Redditch, Bromsgrove and District Employment Committee.
- David Charles Becket, Higher Executive Officer, Ministry of Agriculture, Fisheries and Food.
- Robert Potts Bell, Member, Northumberland Agricultural Executive Committee.
- Ethel Marguerite Bennett, Secretary and Accountant, Royal Cambridge Home for Soldiers' Widows, East Molesey.
- Andrew Bennie, JP, Chairman, Falkirk and District Disablement Advisory Committee.
- Charles Bentley. For political and public services in Barnsley.
- Commander Tristram Anthony Pack-Beresford, Royal Navy (Retired), lately Inspector, Imperial Lighthouse Service, Bahamas, Ministry of Transport.
- George Berman, Senior Executive Officer, Board of Trade.
- Edward Jesse Billenness, District Visiting Inspector, Contract Department (Naval), Ministry of Defence (Navy).
- Stanley Gwalter Bishop, Senior Experimental Officer, Signals Research and Development Establishment, Ministry of Aviation.
- Daniel Crawford Black, Chairman, Thomas Black & Sons (Greenock) Ltd. For services to export.
- William Buchanan Black, Chairman, Wigtownshire Youth Service Advisory Committee.
- Frederick Horace Bond, JP, lately Chief Finance Officer, National Union of Agricultural Workers.
- Alfred Ernest Bower, Grade 4 Officer, Ministry of Labour.
- Edwin James Boyles, Senior Chief Clerk, Newcastle-upon-Tyne, Board of Customs and Excise.
- Florence Bradshaw, lately Lady Welfare Worker, Royal Naval Barracks, Portsmouth, Ministry of Defence (Navy).
- John Brasier, General Secretary, Blackburn Young Men's Christian Association.
- Frank Bridges, Inspector of Taxes (Higher Grade), Board of Inland Revenue.
- Elizabeth Norah Briggs, Grade 4 Officer, Ministry of Labour.
- George Frederick Bright, lately Vote Superintendent, House of Commons.
- Richard Neale Bright, Relief Publicity Officer, British Broadcasting Corporation.
- Robbie Ian Brightwell. For services to Athletics.
- Alexander Britch, Senior Assistant Chief Male Nurse, Calderstones Hospital, Lancashire.
- Thomas Henry Brittain, lately Engineer II, Royal Ordnance Factory, Cardiff, Ministry of Aviation.
- Albert Brown, Technical Officer, Grade I, Ministry of Public Building and Works.
- Harold John Brown, For political and public services in Ilford.
- Marion Gairdner Brown, Private Secretary to United Kingdom Executive Director of International Bank for Reconstruction and Development, Washington, D.C.
- Reginald Edward George Brown, Secretary, London and Home Counties Division, Traders' Road Transport Association, Ltd.
- George James Bruce, Farm Manager, Islay Home Farm, Argyll.
- Ivy Annie Bruce, Clerical Officer (Secretary), Judicial Department of the Privy Council Office.
- John Eric Macalpine Bury, Senior Executive Officer, Export Credits Guarantee Department.
- Ernest Edward Buschenfeld, Chief Fire Officer and Ambulance Supervisor, Wallasey Fire Brigade and Ambulance Service.
- Arthur Brinsley Bush, Chairman, Carmarthen Rabbit Eradication Society.
- Cecil George Butler, Technical Class Grade I (Inspector), Royal Aircraft Establishment, Farnborough, Ministry of Aviation.
- Henry Campbell, Deputy Naval Architect and Chief Designer (Hull), Harland & Wolff Ltd, Belfast.
- George Wilfred Cannell, Chairman, Isle of Man Savings Committee.
- John I'Anson Cartwright, Member of the Executive Committee, National Conference of Friendly Societies.
- Frank Catterall, Executive Officer, Ministry of Pensions and National Insurance.
- Ernest Victor Chamberlain, Director, E.N.V. (Aycliffe) Ltd, County Durham.
- Ernest Norman Clark, Executive Engineer, Cambridge, General Post Office.
- The Reverend Canon John Wilfred Clift, Senior Chaplain, Missions to Seamen, Southampton.
- John Frederick George Coles, Assistant Secretary (Training), St. John Ambulance Association. (Lately Commissioner, Red Cross and St. John Commission, Cyprus.)
- Alexander Collin, Superintendent and Depute Chief Constable, Berwick, Roxburgh and Selkirk Constabulary.
- Eileen Hilda Colwell, Children's Librarian, Hendon Public Library.
- John Irwin Connelly, Chief Warden, Civil Defence Corps, Oldham.
- Captain Reginald Cooling, TD, Assistant Secretary, Territorial and Auxiliary Forces Association for the County of Derby.
- Major Ernest Harby Cooper, Grade 4 Officer, Ministry of Labour.
- Geraldine Elizabeth Coss, Superintendent of Typists, Department of Education and Science.
- Wing Commander Henry John Cowley, lately Administration Officer, Headquarters, Middlesex Wing Air Training Corps, Ministry of Defence (Air).
- Victor James Cox, BEM, Chief Development Engineer, Aviation Division, Ekco Electronics Ltd.
- Herbert Stanley Grace, lately Managing Director, Kindbergs Ltd, West Hartlepool.
- Ada Bertha Craig, County Borough Organiser, Preston, Women's Voluntary Service.
- Sarah Elizabeth Kathleen Crawford, lately Matron, Ulster Volunteer Force Hospitals, Craigavon and Galwally, Northern Ireland.
- Horace Ernest Crocker, Sales Section Manager, Agricultural Division, Imperial Chemical Industries Ltd.
- Harold George Crook, Area Engineer, Liverpool, General Post Office.
- Joan Parnell Culverwell, Examiner of Private Acts, House of Lords.
- John Martin Danby, JP, Headmaster, North Ferriby County Primary School, formerly Headmaster, Etton Pasture Special School, East Riding of Yorkshire.
- Clifford Davies. For services to the Boy Scouts Association in Glamorgan.
- Commander John Douglas Rosdew Davies, Royal Navy (Retired), lately Liaison Officer, Navy League and Sea Cadet Corps.
- John Clifford Dawson, JP, Chairman, National Assistance Appeal Tribunal for the York Area.
- Herbert Edward Devlin, Personnel Adviser to Chief Engineer, British European Airways Corporation.
- Cecilia Double, Volunteer, British Embassy La Paz, Bolivia
- Charles Laing Donaldson, Higher Executive Officer, Ministry of Pensions and National Insurance.
- George Valentine Drummond, Engineer (Main Grade), Ministry of Public Building and Works.
- Florence Beatrice Frances Dunningham, Chairman, London Regional Street Groups Advisory Savings Sub-Committee.
- John William Dunscombe, Senior Information Officer, Central Office of Information.
- John Howard Durban, Member of Nantyglo and Blaina Urban District Council.
- Dorothy Elaine Dyball, County Organiser, Westmorland, Women's Voluntary Service.
- Jane Edgeworth (Mrs. Eastham), Head of Drama Section, Drama and Music Department, British Council.
- Margaret Agnes Edwardes, School Secretary-Accountant, Highfield School, Liphook, Hampshire.
- Colonel Thomas Leslie Emmott, TD, Chief Officer, Intelligence and Operations Sub-Section, Civil Defence Corps, Salford.
- Leonard David Epps, Higher Executive Officer, Ministry of Agriculture, Fisheries and Food.
- Orlando Evans, Senior Master and Biology Master, Amman Valley Grammar School, Ammanford.
- Alderman Olive Julia Field. For public services in Barnard Castle and district, County Durham.
- Phyllis Irene Field, Secretary, Birmingham Citizens' Advice Bureau.
- Michael Anthony Fitzgerald, Inspector of Child Care, London.
- Mary Teresa Foley, Chief Superintendent of Typists, Ministry of Overseas Development.
- Florence Eunice Forshaw, Head Teacher, John F. Kennedy Centre for mentally sub-normal children.
- Frederick Frost, National Savings District Member for Middlesex North West.
- Ralph Henry George Gammon, Senior Investigation Officer, Board of Customs and Excise.
- Ralph Leslie Gardner, Welfare Officer Class II, Regional Headquarters, London Postal Region, General Post Office.
- Mildred Ethel Garland, lately Scottish Representative, Dr. Barnardo's Homes.
- William Fairfax Gascoigne, Works Manager, Bridgend Factory, Remploy, Ltd.
- Thornburrow Gibson, Secretary, Stoke-on-Trent Hospital Management Committee.
- Ronald Gilbert, Intelligence Officer Grade II, British Services Security Organisation, Ministry of Defence (Army).
- John Charles Ginn, JP, Editor, Palmers Green & Southgate Gazette.
- Sidney Edmund Goodwin, JP, Honorary Secretary, Cheadle Savings Committee.
- Norman Arthur Eric Grattage, Area Mechanical Engineer, South Eastern Traffic Area, Ministry of Transport.
- Charles Raylton Gray, District Member, South West Devon Savings Committee.
- John Robert Gray, lately Trade Union member of the Northern Regional Board for Industry.
- Robert Elias Griffiths, HM Inspector of Quarries, Ministry of Power.
- Trevor Lewis Griffiths, Chief Engineer, MV New Westminster City, Sir William Reardon Smith & Sons Ltd.
- Cyril Alexander Grey Guthrie, Higher Executive Officer, Public Works Loan Board.
- Joseph Francis Spencer Halliwell, Secretary and Clerk to the Governors, Woolwich Polytechnic.
- Grace May Hamblin, Secretary, Overseas Nursing Association.
- George John Samuel Hampton, DCM, Chairman, Islington War Pensions Committee.
- Stanley Harold Handley, Senior Executive Officer, Ministry of Transport.
- William Robert James Hannant, Member, East Suffolk and Norfolk River Board.
- Alfred Harper, Superintendent, Sorting Office, Chester, General Post Office.
- Isabel Harris. For political and public services in Caerphilly.
- Thomas Stott Harrison, Chief Officer, Southend-on-Sea Fire Brigade.
- Victor Sidney Helmore, Process and General Supervisory Class Grade I, Royal Ordnance Factory, Chorley, Lancashire, Ministry of Defence (Army).
- Nathan Henry, Higher Executive Officer, Ministry of Agriculture, Fisheries and Food.
- Richard Ian Hewat, lately Town Clerk of Castle Douglas and Town Clerk of New Galloway.
- Harry Higgins, General Foreman, Mowlem (Building) Ltd.
- Reginald George Hills, Divisional Engineer (Central Buses), London Transport Board.
- Dorothy Macdonald Himsworth. For voluntary social services in Bristol.
- Brian Charles Hinwood, Assistant Chief Engineer (Construction), South Eastern Gas Board.
- William Hough Hodgkinson, Senior Executive Officer, Manchester, Board of Trade.
- Walter Hogg, Production Superintendent, Sperry Gyroscope Company Ltd, Stonehouse, Gloucestershire.
- Dorothy Ann Frances Holdsworth, Divisional President, Halifax Division, West Yorkshire Branch, British Red Cross Society.
- Frank Simpson Holt, Chairman, Stockport, Macclesfield and District War Pensions Committee.
- Giles Holt. For voluntary services in Whitworth and district, Lancashire.
- Geoffrey Marmont Hopps, lately Honorary Secretary, Birmingham Accident Prevention Group.
- Fred Horner, Secretary, Accredited Poultry Breeders' Federation of England & Wales Ltd.
- James Hosker, lately Chief Accountant, Cammell Laird & Company (Shipbuilders & Engineers) Ltd.
- William Thomas Hull, Higher Executive Officer, Colonial Office.
- Ronald David Ernest Hutchings, Canal Manager, Inland Waterways Association.
- Norman Hyett, Grade 4 Officer, Foreign Office.
- Kathleen Ada Jeffery, Executive Officer, Ministry of Agriculture, Fisheries and Food.
- Dorothy May Jeffs, Higher Executive Officer, Ministry of Public Building and Works.
- Harold Roland Jenkins, General Manager, Manchester and Salford Trustee Savings Bank.
- Trevor Jenkins, Chief Engineer, Guest Keen Iron and Steel Works, Cardiff.
- Frank Barnes Johnson, TD, lately Secretary to the House of Keys and Clerk of Tynwald.
- The Reverend John Johnston, Officiating Chaplain (Presbyterian, Methodist and United Board) Headquarters (Unit) No. 18 Group, Royal Air Force.
- Evelyn Elizabeth Jones, Executive Officer, Board of Inland Revenue.
- Ian Puleston Jones, Works Manager (Metallurgy), Springfields Works, United Kingdom Atomic Energy Authority.
- Nancy Hannah Jones, Senior Assistant Matron, Hortham Hospital, Bristol.
- Leonard Edward Joyce, Senior Executive Officer, Ministry of Defence (Air).
- Colonel Maurice Henry Vaughan Kendall, MC, DL, Retired Officer III, Regimental Headquarters, The Royal Warwickshire Fusiliers, Ministry of Defence (Army).
- William John Kenyon, Technical Grade "B", Guided Weapons Production Branch, Ministry of Aviation.
- Frederick Kidd. For political and public services in Durham.
- Mavis King, Senior Research Officer, Foreign Office.
- Archibald Frederick Kish, Chief Service Engineer, Rotax Ltd.
- Albert Edward Kittle, Technical Works Group A, Birmingham, General Post Office.
- Major Tadeusz Stanislaw Jozef Klocek, Attached Ministry of Defence.
- Frederick Reginald Knight, Secretary, Midland Region, Federation of Civil Engineering Contractors.
- John Kyle, Secretary, County Antrim Agricultural Association.
- Andrew Gilbert Wauchope Laird, lately Higher Executive Officer, No. 11 Maintenance Unit, RAF Chilmark, Ministry of Defence (Air).
- Hector George Lakeman, District Engineer, Bristol, British Railways Board.
- George Baden Lakin, Manager and Engineer, Forth and Clyde, Monkland and Union Canals, British Waterways Board.
- Hector Thomas Lawrence, BEM, Yard Safety Officer, HM Dockyard, Chatham, Ministry of Defence (Navy).
- Mary Liedtke, lately Chief Woman Officer, Council of Social Service for Wales and Monmouthshire.
- Henry Littler, Inspector of Works (Building), Works Technical Grade I, Ministry of Public Building and Works.
- Louise Edith Locke, Chairman of the Balham & Tooting International Circle.
- Phyllis Winifred Marshall Longmead, Clerical Officer (Secretary), University of London Air Squadron, Ministry of Defence (Air).
- Jean Annetta Vacy Lyle, Executive Officer, Foreign Office.
- John Lang Macaulay, MB, CB, JP, General Practitioner, Lybster, Caithness.
- Hugh Albert McClure, District Organiser, North of Ireland District, Amalgamated Society of Painters and Decorators.
- Charles MacDonald, Head Forester, Forestry Commission, Scotland.
- Deirdre Margaret McDowell, Headmistress, Holy Trinity Church of England Primary School, Bordesley, Birmingham.
- Angus MacLellan. For services to Gaelic oral literature.
- Thomas James MacMillan, JP, Chairman, East Down Rural District Council.
- Mary Elizabeth Mahaffy, Junior Staff Officer, Ulster Office, London.
- Annie Major, Member of the Civil Defence Committee and Deputy Chief Warden, Kingston-upon-Hull.
- Jean, Lady Makins, County Organiser, Hampshire, Women's Voluntary Service.
- Violet Elliot Monfries Maltman, Matron, Aberdeen City Hospital.
- Jamieson Redvers Malyon, Grade 3 Officer, Ministry of Labour.
- Arthur Frederick James Manners, Senior Executive Officer, Ministry of Pensions and National Insurance.
- Ida Mansbridge, Superintendent Nursing Officer, Cumberland County Council.
- Frederick Marchant. For political and public services in Port Talbot.
- Arthur Henry Markham. For services to the British Legion.
- Thomas Marsh, Superintendent (Deputy Chief Constable), Wolverhampton County Borough Police.
- Constance Josephine Marx, Head of Personnel Department, Headquarters, Women's Voluntary Service.
- Robert Forrest Mathieson, London Sales Manager, Electrical Apparatus Company Ltd.
- George Alexander May, Higher Executive Officer, Home Office.
- George James May, Commandant, Salford City Special Constabulary.
- Catherine Mead, lately Deputy Chief Nursing Officer, London County Council.
- Eileen Melville, JP. For public services in Devon.
- Evan Verley Merchant, JP, Welsh Secretary, National Farmers' Union.
- David Thomas Michael, MRCVS, Veterinary Officer, Ministry of Agriculture, Fisheries and Food.
- Thomas Alexander Moag, Member, Executive Committee, Belfast Savings Council.
- Colonel Edwin Perry Morgan, TD, JP, Chairman, St. Austell Youth Employment Committee.
- Margaret Rosemary Morgan, Head of Careers and Employment Department, Spastics Society.
- Nora Kathleen Morgan, Head of Typing Pool, British High Commission, Nicosia, Commonwealth Relations Office.
- Herbert John Morley, Senior Draughtsman, Ministry of Defence (Central Staff).
- Bronislawa Leila Casimir-Mrowczynska, Schoolmistress, Victoria College, Jersey.
- Captain Fergus Birt Murdoch, Master, Duchess of Hamilton, Caledonian Steam Packet Company Ltd, British Railways Board.
- Robert Thomas Murphy, Chief Surveyor, Ordnance Survey, Edinburgh.
- William Henry Neild, Chief Steward, MV Aureol, Elder Dempster Lines Ltd.
- Thomas Vivian Oldfield. For public services in West Hartlepool, County Durham.
- Charles Bernard Owen, Higher Executive Officer, Ministry of Defence (Army).
- Ann Elizabeth Packer (Mrs. Brightwell). For services to Athletics.
- Robina Amelia Palmer, Clerical Officer, Department of Education and Science.
- Wilfred Pearson, Librarian, Ministry of Housing and Local Government.
- Captain Basil Miles Peck, Royal Navy (Retired), Honorary Secretary and Treasurer, Jersey Unit, Navy League and Sea Cadet Corps.
- William Pickersgill, Regional Collector, Board of Inland Revenue.
- Observer Commander John Percival Pickford, DL, Group Commandant, No. 13 Group, Royal Observer Corps.
- The Reverend Alfred James Pilgrim, Chairman, Wireless for the Bedridden Society (Inc.).
- John Arthur Pink, Area Manager, Devonport, National Assistance Board.
- Robert George Pitman, Chief Male Nurse, Rampton Hospital, Retford, Nottingham, Ministry of Health.
- Helen Mary Pollard, JP, County Organiser, Worcestershire, Women's Voluntary Service.
- Esther Stewart Potts, Chairman, Regional Street and Village Groups Advisory Savings Committee.
- Frank Price, Higher Executive Officer, Ministry of Pensions and National Insurance.
- Camille Prior. For services to the Drama in Cambridge.
- Frederick James Frank Properjohns, Engineer II, Electrical Inspection Directorate, Ministry of Aviation.
- Reginald William Puddephatt, Divisional Officer, Berkshire and Reading Fire Brigade.
- John Rae, Senior Executive Officer, Eastern Region, National Assistance Board.
- Mary Denise Rand. For services to Athletics.
- Cyril Parker Rawlinson, Training Service Officer, Grade I, Ministry of Labour.
- Guy Ernest Read, Chief Clerk, The Forces Help Society and Lord Roberts' Workshops.
- Philip John Reed, Executive Officer, Ministry of Transport.
- Irene Dorothy Rees, Executive Officer, Welsh Plant Breeding Station, Plas Gogerddan, Aberystwyth.
- John Edward Lynn Reilly, Deputy Principal, National Assistance Board of Northern Ireland.
- Phyllis Evelyn Reynolds, Chairman, Executive Committee, National Association of State Enrolled Nurses.
- Robin Edmund Reynolds, lately Engineer (Inspecting), Crown Agents for Oversea Governments and Administrations.
- John Reginald Roberts, Honorary Secretary, Institute of Weights and Measures Administration.
- Nora Elsie Roberts. For services to the World Food Council and to the Finance Corporation for Industry.
- Richard Roberts, Member, Booth Hall and Monsall Hospital Management Committee, Manchester.
- Arthur Edward Robertson, Head of Engineering Training Department, British Broadcasting Corporation.
- Elisabeth Margaret Roscoe, Departmental Specialist, Government Communications Headquarters.
- Alfred John Ross. For public services in Bridge-Blean and District, Kent.
- Mabel Scott Ross, Member, Streets and Social Organisations Advisory Committee of the Scottish Savings Committee.
- Bernard Charles George Rowsell, Senior Executive Officer, Ministry of Defence (Air).
- Hilda Russell, Night Superintendent, St. Bartholomew's Hospital, London.
- Conrad James Sanders, Assistant Chief Officer, Wiltshire Fire Brigade.
- James Alwyne Sandham, Head Postmaster, Halifax.
- John Scott, Architect. For services to the County Antrim Education Committee.
- Walter Alexander Scott, Senior Experimental Officer, HM Nautical Almanac Office, Ministry of Defence (Navy).
- Frank Carl Seager, Chairman, No. 135 (Reigate & Redhill) Squadron Committee, Air Training Corps.
- Frank Selwyn, Senior Draughtsman, Ship Department, Ministry of Defence (Navy).
- Samuel Semple, Vice-Principal, Lisburn Technical College.
- Horace Walter Frank Sexstone, Senior Executive Officer, Ministry of Defence (Army).
- Florence Olive Simmonds. For political and public services in Stafford.
- Alexandra Marion Skinner, lately Assistant to the Lord Provost's Secretary, Glasgow.
- George Allan Smith, JP. For political and public services in Barrow-in-Furness.
- Henry Smith, Managing Director, Alligator Leather Goods Company Ltd, Bishop Auckland.
- Leslie Smith, Manager, Haunchwood Colliery, West Midlands Division, National Coal Board.
- Squadron Leader Robert Christopher Smith, Engineer Technical Grade I, Ministry of Aviation.
- William Nassau Smythe, Honorary Secretary, Aldershot Branch, The Old Contemptibles Association.
- William James Snow, District Member for South East Essex Savings Committee.
- Francis Joseph Spicer, Senior Warning Officer, Winchester Group, Air Raid Warning Organisation.
- Henry Spooner, Supervising Examiner (Driving Tests), Plymouth, Ministry of Transport.
- Thomas Henry Loram Stanbury, Chief Engineer, Port Auxiliary Service, HM Dockyard, Devonport, Ministry of Defence (Navy).
- Peter Stephenson, Private Secretary to the Lord Chief Justice of England.
- The Reverend Canon Alexander Walton Stevenson, Member, Scottish Savings Committee.
- Vera Dorothy Eileen Steward, Assistant, Finance Unit, Central Services, British Broadcasting Corporation.
- Louis Alexander Hugh Kennedy Stewart, Field Officer (Technical Assistant Grade I)j Red Deer Commission, Scotland.
- Lillian Stockdale, Chairman, Sale, Altrincham and District Spastics Society.
- George Stoker, lately Secretary, Sheffield Joint Committee of the Refractories' Industries (Silicosis) Scheme.
- Charles Smith Strath, Chief Superintendent, Metropolitan Police.
- Jessy Stronge. For public services in County Down.
- Harold William Tart, Headmaster, Bushbury Hill Junior School, Wolverhampton.
- Arthur Vivian Thomas, Senior Experimental Officer, Forest Products Research Laboratory, Department of Scientific and Industrial Research.
- Gordon Glyn Thomas. For political and public services in Swansea.
- Gwendoline Violet Thompson, Higher Executive Officer, Export Services Branch, Board of Trade.
- May Thornton, Matron of Brockle Bank Home for the Aged and Infirm, Wandsworth.
- Winifred Alexandra Tibbs, lately Headmistress, Lavender Hill Secondary Girls School, Battersea.
- Charles Henry Tidey, Higher Executive Officer, National Incomes Commission.
- Joseph George Turner, General Manager, Suprema Poultry Farmers (Western) Ltd.
- Joseph Gordon Turvey, lately Senior Field Secretary, National Association of Boys' Clubs.
- Elijah Twigger, BEM, JP, Chairman, Coventry, Nuneaton and District War Pensions Committee.
- Agnes Mary Unsworth, Principal, Newsham Drive Women's Centre, Liverpool.
- John Joseph Vickerstaff. For political and public services in the County of Durham.
- Irene Agnes Causabon-Vincent, Regional Civil Defence Organiser, Kent, Women's Voluntary Service.
- Michael Henry Dodsworth Vodden, lately Master at Punjab School, Nab ha, India, British Council.
- Alice Mary Walker, General Secretary for England, Girl Guides Association.
- Margaret Mary Patricia Walker, Clerical Officer (Secretary), Ministry of Power.
- John Conway Walling, Senior Physicist, Low Temperature Physics, Mullard Research Laboratories, Redhill, Surrey.
- William Denys Walton, Inspector of Taxes (Higher Grade), Board of Inland Revenue.
- James Duncan Warmingham, Export Sales Manager, Carr & Company Ltd, Biscuit Manufacturers, Carlisle.
- Marjorie Annie Warnes, Senior Executive Officer, Ministry of Pensions and National Insurance.
- Sidney Watson, Higher Executive Officer, HM Treasury.
- Alfred Dowley Welch, Grade 6 Officer, Ministry of Labour.
- William John Weston, Clerk to the Brecknock Rural District Council.
- Frank Whalley, Executive Officer, Ministry of Health.
- Dorothy Emily Louise White, lately Headmistress, Outwood County Primary School, Redhill, Surrey.
- Frederick George Samuel Alexander White, District Inspector, Royal Ulster Constabulary.
- Stanley Nicholson Whitehead, Member of the Beaconsfield Urban District Council.
- Margaret Annie Wilkinson, lately Junior Staff Officer, Ministry of Home Affairs for Northern Ireland.
- Charles Fitzgerald Williams, Ship Manager, John Brown & Company (Clydebank) Ltd.
- Gladys Williams, Clerical Officer (Secretary), Ministry of Agriculture, Fisheries and Food.
- John Philip David Williams, Clerical Officer, Metropolitan Police.
- Leonard Williams, lately Chief Reporter, Exeter, The Western Morning News.
- Maud Clara Willis, Higher Executive Officer, Civil Service Commission.
- Captain Harry Reuben Wilson. For public services in Middlesex.
- Doris Windle, Labour Manager, Inspectorate of the Master General of the Ordnance, North Midland Region, Ministry of Defence (Army).
- William Henry Charles Windsor, Honorary Treasurer, Portsmouth Local Committee, Royal Navy Benevolent Trust.
- Provost George Wood, JP, Chairman, Board of Management for Banffshire Hospitals.
- Robert Buchanan Wood, Deputy Agent, A.C.D. Bridge Company. For services in connection with the Forth Road Bridge.
- William Trevor James Wood, Area Officer for Wales, Rural Industries Bureau.
- William Woodcock, Senior Executive Officer, Ministry of Pensions and National Insurance.
- Colonel Alexander Woods, TD, DL, Commandant, City of London Special Constabulary.
- Reginald George Woods, Chief Tester, Naval Contracts Department, Laurence, Scott & Electromotors Ltd, Norwich.
- Arthur James Woodward, Works Manager, Electronics Department, Ferranti Ltd, Hollinwood, Lancashire.
- George Job Wooster, Member, Leicestershire Agricultural Executive Committee.
- John Bernard Wright, Executive Officer, Cabinet Office.
- Sydney William Walter Wright, Senior Security Officer (Investigating), Ministry of Aviation.
- May Elizabeth Young, Executive Officer, Naval Personnel Division I, Ministry of Defence (Navy).
- Peter Eversly Amorer, Grade IV Clerk, Her Majesty's Embassy, Caracas.
- Verner Courtenay Bickley, lately Lecturer in English Language and Literature, University of Indonesia.
- John Alqwyn Browning, Head of Foreign Staff, Ankara College.
- Sheila Helen Christine Compton, Shorthand-typist, Foreign Office, attached to the Commonwealth Relations Office for service in Brunei.
- Giuliano Consolo, Clerk, Her Majesty's Consulate, Florence.
- Barbara Mary Deavin, Senate Liaison Officer and Head of Internal Section, British Military Government, Berlin.
- Arthur Jean-Jacques Dunn, lately British Council Regional Director, Phnom Penh.
- Yvonne Sidonie Henriette Esslen, British Vice-Consul, Hamburg.
- Marie Winifred Foster, Grade I Clerk, Her Majesty's Embassy, Washington.
- Oliver Ernest Kenneth Laband, British subject resident in the Federal Republic of Cameroon.
- Kathleen Christiana Lart, Receptionist, Her Majesty's Embassy, Bonn.
- Joseph Frederick Levy, British subject resident in Peru.
- Alexander Scott Lindsay, Her Majesty's Consul, Vigo.
- Robert Mackenzie, British subject resident in Greece.
- Geoffrey Euan Mills, Attache, Her Majesty's Embassy, Copenhagen.
- Joan Nolan, British Pro-Consul, Rosario.
- Ellen Mary O'Dwyer, lately Clinical Instructor, School of Nursing, Tabriz.
- William John Parkyns, lately Her Majesty's Consul, Bangkok.
- Edward Balfour Randall, Archivist, British Residency, Bahrain.
- Kathleen Theodora Rhodes, British subject resident in France.
- Winifred Bartleman Shiels, Personal Assistant to Her Majesty's Ambassador, Copenhagen.
- Margaret Doreen Squires, Shorthand-typist, Foreign Office, lately attached to the Commonwealth Relations Office for service in Nicosia.
- Dorothy Stoecklin, Personal Assistant to Her Majesty's Consul-General, Zurich.
- Donald Hubert Stokes, Information Officer and Vice-Consul, Her Majesty's Consulate-General, San Francisco.
- Edward Philip Todd, Grade IV Clerk, Her Majesty's Embassy, Paris.
- William George Winter, lately Administration Officer, Her Majesty's Embassy, Leopoldville.
- Frank Abbott, Senior Technical Officer, Ministry of Works, Western Nigeria.
- Therese Alam. For services to the community in the State of New South Wales.
- Edmund Woods Allen, lately Inspector of Education, Northern Nigeria.
- Homi Edulji Amrolia, Chief Clerk, Judicial Department, Kenya.
- Frank Emerson Bainbridge, Superintendent, Mariners' Club, Penang, Malaysia.
- Betty Audrey Sylvia Batchelor, Administrator General and Official Receiver, Uganda.
- Amar Chand Bector, Executive Officer, Department of the Registrar-General, Kenya.
- Montague James Bennett, Mayor of Holroyd Municipal Council, State of New South Wales.
- James Nicol Black, lately Administrative Officer, Class II, Northern Nigeria.
- John Arthur Blundell, Livestock Development Officer, Department of Veterinary Services, Kenya.
- Harry Martyn Bridgman, Deputy Area Settlement Controller, Western Region, Kenya.
- John Wyndham Burnett, Commissioner for Native Courts and Acting Permanent Secretary, Ministry of Justice, Northern Nigeria.
- Alice Rosina Margaret Burrows, Senior Personal Secretary to the Prime Minister of Uganda.
- John Donald Carter, Director of Geological Surveys, Federal Ministry of Mines and Power, Nigeria.
- Elma Gertrude Casely, of Malvern, State of South Australia. For services to the community, particularly in the field of physiotherapy.
- John Douglas Chesswas, Assistant Chief Education Officer (Planning), Uganda.
- Marjorie Ann Hill Christie, Principal Matron, Western Nigeria.
- Daphne Marian Corner, Personal Secretary to the Governor-General of Kenya.
- Percy Alfred Cox, of Mudgee, State of New South Wales. For services to local government.
- Mary Winifred Crawford, lately Matron, Ilorin Maternity Hospital, Northern Nigeria.
- Samuel Delves. For services to the community in the State of New South Wales.
- Irene Myrtle English. For services to the community, particularly in connection with the welfare of aborigines in the State of New South Wales.
- Patrick English, a pioneer farmer in the Malanda district, State of Queensland. For services to local government and the community.
- James Henderson Farquhar. For services to local government and education in Southern Rhodesia.
- David Fitzpatrick, Superintendent, Royal Malaysia Police.
- Beatrice Noel Fletcher, MB, CB. For social and medical welfare services in Northern India.
- Basil Andrew Forsyth. For services to the development of British industrial enterprise in India.
- Robert George Fraser, Chief Valuer, Ministry of Finance, Malaysia.
- McDonald Freeman, Resident Engineer, Tasman Bridge construction, State of Tasmania.
- Winifred Alice Freeman, of Brisbane, State of Queensland. For services to the community.
- George Robert Keith Freeth, Deputy Superintendent, Royal Malaysia Police, State of Sarawak.
- Andrew Gardiner, Works Manager, Eastern Nigeria.
- James George Gillespie, of Melbourne, State of Victoria. For services to the community.
- Ola Cohn Green (Miss Ola Cohn), of East Melbourne, State of Victoria. For services to Art, particularly sculpture.
- Alfred Douglas Grimmer, General Manager, Uganda Credit & Savings Bank.
- Harrie Blaxell Halvorsen. For services to the community and the accountancy profession in the State of Western Australia.
- Mary Hannah Harris, Senior Personal Secretary to the Permanent Secretary, Prime Minister's Office, Uganda.
- Michael Newton Harrison, Senior Plant Breeder, Department of Agriculture, Kenya.
- Harry Hart. For services to sport, particularly Bowls, in Southern Rhodesia.
- Sheila Mary Strang Holmes, Personal Secretary to the Minister of State, Prime Minister's Office, Kenya.
- Ernest James Howard, JP, of Longford, State of Tasmania. For services to the community and local government.
- Leslie Walter Ralph James, Principal Employment Officer, Kenya.
- Lily Jeffries. For charitable services in the State of New South Wales.
- Mohamed Yusuf Khan, Chief Estimates Officer, Kenya.
- Mary Isabella Kirkpatrick, Principal Queen's School, Enugu, Eastern Nigeria.
- Florence Lyons, President, East African Society for the Prevention of Cruelty to Animals, Kenya.
- Allan William McClure, Chairman, Branch in the State of New South Wales of the Royal Life Saving Society of Australia.
- Constance Main, Registry Clerk, Kenya Government Service.
- David Mandie, of Toorak, State of Victoria. For charitable welfare services, particularly as President of the Young Men's Hebrew Association.
- Igor Mann, Chief Animal Industries Officer, Department of Veterinary Services, Kenya.
- Peter Desborough Mansfield, Agricultural Superintendent, Northern Nigeria.
- Cyril Leigh Marriott, Senior Assistant Comptroller of Inland Revenue (Investigation), Ministry of Finance, Malaysia.
- Beatrice Jane Martin, an Alderman of Newcastle City Council, State of New South Wales.
- David Reeves Matthews, lately Superintendent of Parks and Gardens, Footscray, State of Victoria.
- Erach Dinshaw Mehta, Executive Officer, Judicial Department, Kenya.
- Dorothy Meyer, Secretary, Leper Welfare Relief Committee, State of Sabah.
- William John Miller, Principal Education Officer, Northern Nigeria.
- Wyndham Lynn Morgan, Senior Laboratory Superintendent, Jos, Northern Nigeria.
- Alan Harnlyn Moxey, of Brisbane, State of Queensland.
- For services to Music, particularly in connection with children's choirs.
- Charles Antony Marriott Nash, Conservator of Forests, Northern Nigeria.
- Doris May Nimmo, Personal Secretary to the Permanent Secretary, Ministry of Labour, Kenya.
- Charles Peter Ripley Nottidge, Area Settlement Controller (Central Region), Kenya.
- Roger Oxar Parnis, MD, FRCS, Senior Specialist, Western Nigeria.
- Cyril William Pearce, Chief Works Superintendent, Northern Nigeria.
- George Edward Pearson, a leading member of the British community in Perak, Malaysia.
- Sylvia Constance Perry. For services to the community, particularly to ex-servicemen and women, in the State of Western Australia.
- Michael Stuart Philip, Conservator of Forests, Uganda.
- John Charles Victor Radford, Inspector of Education, Eastern Nigeria.
- William Raymond Read, JP, of Perth, State of Western Australia. For services to local government and the community.
- Donald Horsfall Rhodes, Chief Fisheries Officer, Uganda.
- Percival John Riley, Price Controller, Kenya.
- Muriel Grace Robilliard, Senior Matron (Health), Northern Nigeria.
- Ruby May Robinson, of Brisbane, State of Queensland. For services to the advancement of women's sports.
- Roma Adeline Ross, of Warracknabeal, State of Victoria. For charitable welfare services.
- William Thomas Rowland, Superintendent, Royal Malaysia Police.
- Mercer Thomas Shaw, an Organisation and Methods Officer, Treasury, Malaysia.
- Margaret Malcolm Shier, Headmistress, Bauchi Provincial Girls' School, Northern Nigeria.
- John Stanley Shilliday, DCM, Chairman of Commissioners, Mildura Urban Water Trust, State of Victoria.
- Ellen Huberthha Silke. For services to the education of youth in Southern Rhodesia.
- Lancelot Osbert Sleeman, MB, BS, a medical practitioner in Wonthaggi, State of Victoria.
- Madeleine Smart, Executive Officer, Department of Registrar-General, Kenya.
- James Stephen Smith, Vice-Principal, Alliance High School, Kikuyu, Kenya.
- Francis William Waudby-Smith, Senior Surveyor, Northern Nigeria.
- Beryl Audrey Pickering Splatt, lately in charge of the Biochemistry Department, Royal Melbourne Hospital, State of Victoria.
- Johann Otto Steiner, Principal Control Officer, Sleeping Sickness Service, Northern Nigeria.
- Cornelius Alexander Strachan. For services to the community in the State of New South Wales.
- The Reverend Thomas Rees-Thomas, of Brisbane, State of Queensland. For services to the Congregational Church and the community.
- Dorothy Mildred Thompson, Matron, Queen Victoria Maternity Hospital, Launceston, State of Tasmania.
- Paul Tuley, Principal Research Officer, Eastern Nigeria.
- Lilian Irene van Reenen, Private Secretary to the Mayor of Salisbury, Southern Rhodesia.
- Kenneth Arthur Vorley, Administrative Officer, Class I, Northern Nigeria.
- Walter John Wakely, Inspector/Instructor, Federal Board of Customs and Excise, Nigeria.
- Rachel Maude Walters, Steno-Secretary, Chief Secretary's Department, State of South Australia.
- Vernon Morris Walters, MC, Administrative Officer, Class II, Northern Nigeria.
- Robert Alexander Ward, Executive Officer, Kenya National Farmers Union.
- William Wauhop, JP, lately Mayor of East Fremantle, State of Western Australia.
- Hazel Jean Wedlock, lately Secretary to the Lady Mayoress of Sydney, State of New South Wales.
- Augusta Henrietta Johanna Weiss, JP, of Springfield, State of South Australia. For services to the community.
- John Peter Woodcock, Senior Engineer, Public Works Department Headquarters, Kuala Lumpur, Malaysia.
- Norah Woods, lately Matron, Northumbria Nursing Home, Lagos, Nigeria.
- Frederick Herbert Wuth, Deputy Mayor, Toowoomba City Council, State of Queensland.
- Robert Edward Wyatt, Secretary, Institute for Agricultural Research, Ahmadu Bello University, Northern Nigeria.
- Newdigate Owen Malcolm Burne, Senior Technical Officer (Principal Forester), Northern Rhodesia.
- George D'Arcy Crane, of Chingola, Northern Rhodesia. For services in connection with the development of athletics and cycling.
- Gabrielle Sheila Ellison, Senior Visual Aids Officer, Northern Rhodesia.
- Evelyn Foote, Senior Clerical Officer, Grade II, Northern Rhodesia.
- John Walter Hannah, District Commissioner, Chinsali, Northern Rhodesia.
- Senior Chief Ishinde, of the Lunda Tribe, Northern Rhodesia.
- John Frederick Leech, Social Welfare Organiser, Northern Rhodesia.
- Elsie Collins Mitchell, Missionary in charge, Kawama Mission, Kawambwa District, Northern Rhodesia.
- William Godfrey Redding, AFC, Chief Pilot, Northern Rhodesia Government Flight.
- William Wright, Senior District Assistant, Northern Rhodesia.
- John Willetts Adshead, Director of Audit, Gambia.
- Au Wai-sum, Assistant Secretary for Chinese Affairs, Hong Kong.
- James Egan Baird, Superintendent of Prisons, British Guiana.
- Ella Barrow. For social services in British Guiana.
- Edgar Gladstone O'Maley Berridge, Commissioner of Income Tax, Antigua.
- The Reverend John Veo Bitibule, Pastor, Methodist Church, British Solomon Islands Protectorate.
- Euralis Ethel Theresa Bouty, Executive Officer, St. Lucia.
- Henry Edney Conrad Cain, Accountant General, British Honduras.
- John William Victor Gumming, Senior Labour Officer, Department of Labour and Social Security, Gibraltar.
- Clement Sullivan Rodolph D'Auvergne, Income Tax Inspector, St. Lucia.
- Simon Yehia David, Auditor, Audit Department, Aden.
- William Ewart Donnelly. For services to education in Fiji.
- Elspeth Edgar, Matron, Paton Memorial Hospital, Vila, New Hebrides.
- George Sylvester Edwards, Deputy Registrar, Kowloon District Court, Hong Kong.
- Lucille Iona Fisher, lately senior Woman Secretary, Posts and Telecommunications Department, British Guiana.
- Oomah Sunkar Geerjanan, Producer, Broadcasting Service, Mauritius.
- Hubert David Going, Senior Agricultural Livestock Officer, Bechuanaland Protectorate.
- Lisle Arthur Harrison, Chief Commissioner, Boy Scouts Association, Barbados.
- Francois Hoarau, Accountant-General, Seychelles.
- The Reverend Canon John Hatherley Holden, Rural Dean of Essequibo, British Guiana.
- William John Hoy, Principal Assistant Secretary, British Honduras.
- Idwal Hughes, Roads Engineer, Public Works Department, Bermuda.
- Frederick George Ibbott, Drilling Superintendent, Pure Water Supply, Ministry of Works and Hydraulics, British Guiana.
- Leo Nicholas Karpovich, Police Radio Communications Officer, Hong Kong.
- Li Hin-lung. For public services in Hong Kong.
- Thomas Jonathan Lindsay, Controller, Civil Aid Services, Hong Kong.
- Thomas McShane, Maintenance Superintendent, Civil Aviation Department, Bahamas.
- Hilda Elizabeth Mascoll. For public services in Grenada.
- Alexander Edward Muir. For public services in Fiji.
- James Gardiner Nash, Assistant Adviser, Western Aden Protectorate.
- Hussein Nasr Al Buasi, BEM, Junior Assistant Adviser, Aden.
- Esau Bukwane Nkosi, Rural Development Officer, Swaziland.
- Verona Rosamond Oldfield. For public services in Gambia.
- Joseph Louis Pitaluga, Assistant Secretary, Gibraltar.
- Reginald Percy Pye, Senior Master, Gambia High School.
- Rupert Ashley Richardson, BEM, Customs Officer, Bermuda.
- Alice Lillian Robinson. For public services in Bermuda.
- Mary Felicite Patricia Rountree. For public services in Mauritius.
- Guru Dayal Sharma, JP. For public services in Fiji.
- William Marshall Storrs, District Commissioner, Basutoland.
- Te Temete Tebataio, Assistant Co-operative Societies Officer, Gilbert and Ellice Islands Colony.
- Jean Caroline Thomas, Confidential Secretary, Cabinet Office, Bahamas.
- Margaret Elizabeth Williams. For public services in Aden.
- Peter Day Williams, Deputy Commissioner of Police, Basutoland.

=== Order of the Companions of Honour (CH) ===
- The Right Honourable Lewis, Baron Silkin, Labour Member of Parliament for the Peckham Division of Camberwell, 1936-1950. Minister of Town and Country Planning, 1945-1950. Deputy Leader of the Opposition in the House of Lords, 1958-1964. For political and public services.

=== British Empire Medal (BEM) ===
Military Division

Royal Navy

- Chief Petty Officer (Torpedo Anti-Submarine Instructor) Gerald Arthur Abery P/JX 149727.
- Sick Berth Chief Petty Officer Kenneth George Baggs, D/MX 54450.
- Chief Electrical Artificer (Air) Geoffrey Albert Baldwin, L/FX 668538.
- Chief Engine Room Artificer James Edwin Barber, P/MX 645788.
- Chief Petty Officer (Coxswain) Richard Jesse Bennett, D/JX 646049.
- Regimental Sergeant Major George Albert Bray, Royal Marines, CH/X 4313.
- Master-at-Arms Arthur Bryant, D/MX 888116.
- Chief Petty Officer Cook (S) Patrick Byrne, D/MX 61963.
- Chief Petty Officer Francis James Anthony Joseph Emmanuel Laurence Calleja, E/J 283415.
- Chief Petty Officer (Coxswain) Robert Dannatt, D.S.M, P/JX 283275.
- Chief Electrical Artificer Donald William Eastmond, D/MX 60691.
- Aircraft Artificer (First Class) Anthony Wilfred Frankcom, L/FX 670075.
- Chief Petty Officer Joseph Gorton, P/JX 661964.
- Chief Petty Officer (Aircrewman First Class) John Samuel Hargreaves, L/FX 80779.
- Chief Petty Officer John Derek Harker, P/JX 712774.
- Chief Petty Officer Alfred Ernest Victor Hawes, P/JX 131291.
- Chief Engine Room Artificer Roger Joseph Husson, D/MX 73958.
- Chief Radio Supervisor Albert George Johnson, P/JX 134312.
- Chief Petty Officer Arthur Jordan, D/JX 156691.
- Master-at-Arms Dudley Raymond Kearn, P/MX 715074.
- Chief Mechanician Ivor Francis William Kelland, D/KX 788705.
- Chief Petty Officer (Stores Accountant) Arthur Edward Lang, D/MX 58613.
- Acting Chief Electrical Artificer Eric Frank Lemmon, P/MX 703944.
- Chief Mechanician John Merrifield, D/KX 728558.
- Chief Engine Room Artificer (MW) Kenneth Eric Myland, L/FX 686473.
- Chief Wren Quarters Assistant Dorothy Eileen Philipson, Women's Royal Naval Service No. 45890.
- Chief Petty Officer Writer Oliver John Morrish Reubens, D/MX 789947.
- Chief Petty Officer Leslie John Smale, D/JX 144766.
- Quartermaster Sergeant Robert William Smith, Royal Marines, CH/X 4918.
- Chief Radio Electrical Artificer Leonard James Tunkin, D/MX 569374.
- Colour Sergeant Lawrence James Turner, Royal Marines, PO/X 3947.

Army

- 22526188 Sergeant Anthony Allen, Corps of Royal Electrical and Mechanical Engineers.
- 2734087 Sergeant George Brain, Welsh Guards.
- 19036604 Staff-Sergeant Ronald Eric Bright, Army Physical Training Corps.
- 22523023 Staff-Sergeant Thomas Edward Broughton, Royal Tank Regiment, Royal Armoured Corps.
- 23051183 Staff-Sergeant Alan George Coles, Corps of Royal Engineers.
- T/19041874 Warrant Officer Class II (acting) Kenneth Douglas, Royal Army Service Corps.
- 22736453 Staff-Sergeant (acting) Kenneth John Gater, Royal Army Ordnance Corps.
- 745110 Sergeant Reginald John Gooch, Royal Army Medical Corps, Territorial Army.
- 2547987 Staff-Sergeant (acting) Norman Harris, Corps of Royal Electrical and Mechanical Engineers.
- 3394350 Staff-Sergeant John Joseph Higgin-Bottom, The Lancashire Regiment (Prince of Wales's Volunteers).
- 22971369 Sergeant Frederick George Holmon-Royd, Royal Corps of Signals.
- 23669616 Provisional Warrant Officer Class I (Bandmaster) George Howson, Royal Regiment of Artillery, Territorial Army.
- S/22848981 Staff-Sergeant (acting) Gordon Johnstone, Royal Army Service Corps.
- 22781997 Sergeant Richard Kelly, The Royal Inniskilling Fusiliers.
- Colour Sergeant Darnley Dacosta Kirton, The Barbadoes Regiment (Volunteer).
- S/14457730 Staff-Sergeant Lemuel Charles Ledsam, Royal Army Service Corps.
- 22796770 Sergeant Peter McLaren, Corps of Royal Military Police.
- 1891987 Staff-Sergeant Harold Edward Meakin, Army Catering Corps.
- 849050 Staff-Sergeant (Drum Major) Robert Norsworthy, The Gloucestershire Regiment.
- 19054056 Staff-Sergeant Brian Henry O'Beney, Corps of Royal Electrical and Mechanical Engineers.
- 21134038 Sergeant Partiman Pun, Gurkha Signals.
- T/23544860 Corporal Paul Puckey, Royal Army Service Corps.
- 4450164 Staff-Sergeant Joseph Quin, The Parachute Regiment, The Parachute Corps, Territorial Army.
- 22970352 Sergeant William Kenneth Ricketts, Corps of Royal Engineers.
- S/22355500 Warrant Officer Class II (acting) John Robertson, Royal Army Service Corps.
- 22212767 Warrant Officer Class II (acting) (now Sergeant) Ronald Gordon Rotherham, Royal Corps of Signals.
- 22530157 Warrant Officer Class II (acting) William James Russell, The Gloucestershire Regiment.
- 19054195 Staff-Sergeant Maxton John Dodds Smith, Corps of Royal Engineers.
- 22541949 Sergeant Denis Stanley Thomas Sparrow, Royal Corps of Signals.
- T/14461038 Sergeant William Stewart, Royal Army Service Corps.
- Colour-Sergeant Taderera, Rhodesia African Rifles.
- 23097793 Sergeant Peter William Todd, Royal Corps of Signals.
- 1157460 Warrant Officer Class II (local) Graham Tooley, Royal Regiment of Artillery.
- 19056652 Staff-Sergeant (acting) John Watson, The Royal Anglian Regiment.
- 22218578 Staff-Sergeant Henry Young, The Argyll and Sutherland Highlanders (Princess Louise's).
- Warrant Officer Class II Bedson Chituma, 1st Battalion, Northern Rhodesia Regiment. (Dated 23 October 1964).
- Warrant Officer Class II Gabriel Elias, 2nd Battalion, Northern Rhodesia Regiment. (Dated 23 October 1964).

Royal Air Force

- Warrant Officer Class II Takaruza Muduviwa, Royal Rhodesian Air Force.
- 638733 Flight Sergeant George William Blake.
- 902877 Flight Sergeant Reginald William Gordon Collins.
- 27 572987 Flight Sergeant Kenneth William Deane.
- 651251 Flight Sergeant Arthur William Holden.
- 578794 Flight Sergeant Stanley George Horler.
- 621345 Flight Sergeant William Jenkins.
- 551816 Flight Sergeant Lester Cheyne Law.
- 517194 Flight Sergeant Clifford Little.
- 522060 Flight Sergeant Charles McDowell.
- 3021281 Flight Sergeant Donald Granville Manser.
- 1911431 Flight Sergeant Jeremiah Benedict Mercer.
- 939892 Flight Sergeant Alan Merriman.
- 631699 Flight Sergeant Evan Arthur Norris.
- 1280976 Flight Sergeant Stanley Sharpe.
- 2297185 Chief Technician John William Davis.
- 518822 Chief Technician Thomas Dixon.
- 4004457 Chief Technician Donald George Douglass.
- 618789 Chief Technician Viner Lewis.
- 585026 Chief Technician Sydney Charles Lord.
- 4003456 Chief Technician Ramon Lunn.
- 579539 Chief Technician John Patrick Arnold Westlake.
- 574772 Chief Technician James Wilson.
- 4019738 Acting Flight Sergeant Donald Thompson.
- 469412 Sergeant Grace Victoria Benns, Women's Royal Air Force.
- 2287015 Sergeant Charles William Brock.
- 623934 Sergeant Thomas Cooke.
- 2062256 Sergeant Gladys Cooper, Women's Royal Air Force.
- 612459 Sergeant Ernest Henry Raney Elliott.
- 4007605 Sergeant Michael Fogarty.
- 4074085 Sergeant William Macrae.
- 2268706 Sergeant Leonard Isaac Phillips.
- 1922206 Sergeant Timothy John Howell Raymond.
- 727582 Sergeant Cedric Osborne Suratali.
- 3515992 Sergeant John Albert Yates.
- 1927738 Corporal Kenneth John Frederick Biggs.
- 2831600 Corporal Rosemarie Bow, Women's Royal Air Force.
- 1925941 Corporal Robert Lawrence Lancaster.

Civil Division

United Kingdom

- Reginald William Adlem, Installation Supervisor (Gas Fitting), Southern Gas Board. (Reading.)
- Robert Stanley Alderson, Senior Foreman of Works, HM Prison, Wormwood Scrubs.
- Leslie James Allen, Head Timekeeper, Charles Hill & Sons Ltd, Bristol.
- William Alexandra Andress, Senior Locomotive Running Inspector, Paddington, British Railways Board. (Swindon.)
- Albert Edward Andrews, Chargehand Scaffolder, Westminster Abbey. (London S.E.11.)
- David Appleton, Assistant Engineer (Masons Department), Consett Iron Co. Ltd. (Consett.)
- Leslie Edward Atkinson, Chargehand of Aircraft Fitters, Yeovilton, Ministry of Defence (Navy).
- Harry Roberts Baker, Honorary Collector, "Midland Red" Savings Group, Bearwood. (Halesowen, Worcester.)
- John William Stewart Baker, JP, M.T. Driver, RAF Cardington, Ministry of Defence (Air Force). (Kempston, Bedfordshire.)
- Charles Hackward Basham, Assistant Foreman, Naval Ordnance Inspectorate, Newcastle, Ministry of Defence (Navy). (Gateshead.)
- William James Basnett, Arms Storeman, 5th Bn., King's Regiment (T.A.). (Kirby, Lancashire.)
- Frederick Bates, School Staff Instructor, Rugby School Contingent, Combined Cadet Force.
- Samuel Beeston, Turbine Operator, Wolverhampton Power Station, West Midlands Division, Midlands Region, Central Electricity Generating Board. (Wolverhampton.)
- John Benzies, Chief Officer Class I, HM Borstal, Rochester.
- Lilian Daisy Betts, Chief Supervisor, Maidstone Telephone Exchange, General Post Office.
- Surinder Nath Bhenote, Clerk I, Ordnance Depot, Kenya, Ministry of Defence (Army).
- Percy Blackburn, Civilian Instructor Grade IV, Ministry of Defence (Air Force). (Wellington, Salop.)
- Joseph Bowden, Chargehand Driver, Amersham, United Kingdom Atomic Energy Authority.
- John Reginald Bright, Member, Headquarters Section, Civil Defence Corps. (London N.W.2.)
- Victor George Brittain, Warrant Officer, No. 367 (South Sheffield) Squadron, Air Training Corps. (Sheffield.)
- Alfred Thomas Brown, Machine Operator, Derby Group of Factories, Rolls-Royce Ltd.
- Melville Burgess, Storeman/Clerk, Territorial and Auxiliary Forces Association of the Counties of Roxburgh, Berwick and Selkirk. (Galashiels.)
- William Burns, Collector, Works Savings Group, British Portland Cement Co, Ltd, Magheramourne, County Antrim. (Larne.)
- Henry William Chaplin, Lorry Driver, London Transport Board. (London N.W.10.)
- Gordon Benjamin Albert Chittock, School Staff Instructor, Highgate School Contingent, Combined Cadet Force. (London N.6.)
- Ronald Peach Cleal, Chief Officer Class I, HM Prison, Lincoln.
- Lewis Clifford, Collector, Glastonbury Road Savings Group, Morden, Surrey.
- David Coey, Head Foreman Boilermaker, Harland and Wolff Ltd, Belfast.
- Joseph Coleman, DCM, Honorary Street Savings Group Canvasser, Billingham and District.
- Richard Porter Collinson, Foreman, Egg Packing Station, Bateson & Whalley, Broughton. (Preston.)
- William George Compston, Chief Inspector, Head Post Office, Belfast.
- Robert Conn, Shipkeeper, Ulster Division, Royal Naval Reserve, Ministry of Defence (Navy). (Belfast.)
- Charles Constance, Civilian Instructor, No. 398 (Staines & Egham) Squadron, Air Training Corps. (Staines.)
- Emerson Cook, Underground Developer, Kinneil Colliery, Scottish Division, National Coal Board. (Bo'ness, West Lothian.)
- Harold James Cooke, Assistant Parks Superintendent, Hampton Court Gardens and Park, Ministry of Public Building and Works. (East Molesey.)
- Mona Margaret Cooper, Telephonist, Telephone Exchange, Douglas, Isle of Man, General Post Office.
- Ernest Richard Cornford, Electrical Fitter, London Transport Board. (Hounslow.)
- Reginald George Cotton, Inspector, Head Post Office, Uxbridge, Middlesex. (Hayes.)
- Arthur Court, Labourer, Ministry of Defence (Army). (Teddington, Middlesex.)
- Evelyn Constance Courtney, Cook Supervisor, Cromwell Junior and Infant Schools, Middlesbrough.
- Eric George Coveney, Foreman Craftsman, Tate Gallery. (London N.15.)
- Constance Mabel Cronk, Centre Organiser, Bognor Regis, Women's Voluntary Service.
- John Dacey, Supplies Superintendent, Supplies Department, General Post Office. (Enfield, Middlesex.)
- Charles Henry Davis, Macebearer and Mayor's Attendant, Aldershot Borough Council.
- Alfred Neighbour Windham Eade, Chargehand, Royal Aircraft Establishment, Farnborough, Ministry of Aviation.
- George Eddleston, Tractor Foreman, East Lancashire District, Ministry of Agriculture, Fisheries and Food. (Blackburn.)
- Thomas James Edwards, Donkeyman, THV Alert, Corporation of Trinity House. (Swansea.)
- Arnold Fairless, Plant Foreman, A.C.D. Bridge Company. (Bishop Auckland.)
- Felix Frederick George Fullbrook, Instructor Grade III, 43 Command Workshop, Ministry of Defence (Army). (Farnborough.)
- William Fulton, Sub-District Commandant, Ulster Special Constabulary. (Limavady.)
- Ronald Garnett Galloway, Sub-Postmaster, Hyde Road TSO, Manchester.
- Arthur Alan Horace William Gaston, Experimental Worker I, Royal Armament Research and Development Establishment, Ministry of Defence (Army). (Shoreham, Kent.)
- Thomas Frederick Godfrey, Apprentice Training Instructor, Western Division, South Western Region, Central Electricity Generating Board. (Barnstaple.)
- Alexander Graham, Foreman, W. & J. Knox Ltd, Kilbirnie.
- Colin Cameron Gray, Fireman Boilerman, Barclay, Curie & Co. Ltd, Glasgow.
- George Geddes Green, Sub-Officer, North-Eastern Fire Brigade, Scotland. (Buckie.)
- Brian Richard Griggs, Estate Surveying Assistant, Grade III, Ministry of Public Building and Works. (Brighton.)
- Charles Henry Gunner, Storekeeper (Staff), Dennis Bros. Ltd. (Guildford.)
- William John Hadden, Chief Observer, Post 25/T.4, Royal Observer Corps. (Muirkirk, Ayrshire.)
- Winifred Mary Hallam, Bus Driver, Rotherham Corporation Transport Department.
- Godfrey Norman Ham, Machine Shop Foreman, J. Samuel White & Co. Ltd, Cowes, Isle of Wight.
- George William Hardy, Assistant to the Works Manager, Pickerings Ltd, Stockton-on-Tees.
- Bernard Charles Hawkins, General Foreman, Witham Fourth District Internal Drainage Board. (Boston, Lincolnshire.)
- Harold Dean Henley, Technical Class Grade III, Kew Observatory, Ministry of Defence (Air Force). (Twickenham, Middlesex.)
- Thomas Edmund Hewett, Foreman Fitter, Abingdon, Ministry of Public Building and Works. (Watlington.)
- Francis William Hodges, Principal Foreman of Stores, RAF Hartlebury, Ministry of Defence (Air Force).
- Thomas Hodgson, Deputy Chief Civil Defence Warden of the County of Clackmannan.
- Thomas Hope, Safety Officer, North Walbottle Colliery, Northumberland and Durham Division, National Coal Board. (Newcastle-upon-Tyne.)
- Leslie Arthur Howes, Architectural and Civil Engineering Assistant III, Ministry of Public Building and Works. (Fetcham, Surrey.)
- William Hughes, Donkeyman, MV Cretic, Shaw Savill & Albion Co. Ltd. (Liverpool.)
- Nellie Winifred Hughesdon, House Supervisor (Properties & Services), British Overseas Airways Corporation. (Stanwell.)
- Arthur Irving, Station Foreman, Dalry, Scottish Region, British Railways Board.
- George Harry Izzard, Farm Manager Grade I, HM Borstal, Hollesley Bay Colony.
- James Jackson, Maintenance Storeman, Royal Victoria Hospital, Belfast.
- William Jackson, Chief Steward, SS Sir Archibald Page, Stephenson Clarke Ltd. (Sunderland.)
- Margaret Sara Jacobs, Group Officer, Auxiliary Fire Service, London. (London, N.W.6.)
- Ronald Charles James, Laboratory Mechanic, Radio Research Station, Department of Scientific and Industrial Research. (Slough.)
- Gertrude Frances May Jesson, Commandant, Herts/16 Detachment, Hertfordshire Branch, British Red Cross Society. (Berkhamsted.)
- Marion Margaret Cook Jewitt, Member of the Regional Staff, Newcastle-upon-Tyne, Women's Voluntary Service.
- John Kimberley Johnson, House Foreman, Kensington House, British Broadcasting Corporation. (London, S.W.9.)
- John Owen Jones, Sample Preparation Operator, Chance-Pilkington, Optical Works, St Asaph, Flintshire.
- Thomas John Jones, Repairer, Llay Main Colliery, North Western Division, National Coal Board. (Treuddyn.)
- Mary Joseph, JP, Street Savings Group Collector, Llanelly, National Savings Committee.
- Thomas Kelly, Team Leader, Yorkshire Main Colliery, Yorkshire Division, National Coal Board. (Edlington.)
- Colin Kenyon, General Building Foreman, Merseyside and North Wales Electricity Board. (Warrington.)
- Matilda Graham King, Chief Supervisor, Telephone Exchange, Kilmarnock, General Post Office.
- Harriet Kirk, Nurse in charge of Occupational Centre, Caldwell House, Renfrewshire.(Glasgow.)
- Hedley Kirkby, Skilled Engineering Foreman, Edgar Allen & Co. Ltd. (Sheffield.)
- Alfred Law, Plater, John Readhead & Sons Ltd, South Shields.
- Mary Edwards Lawless, Group Member, Stirlingshire Branch, British Red Cross Society. (Falkirk.)
- Frank Leak, Senior Technician, Leeds General Infirmary.
- George Leask, Station Officer, Lerwick Fire Station.
- Edmund Francis Leppard, Assistant Divisional Officer, Grimsby Fire Brigade.
- Robert Temperley Little, lately Process and General Supervisory Grade II, Royal Armament Research & Development Establishment, Ministry of Defence (Army). (Orpington, Kent.)
- Henry Gordon Lonney, Tool Inspector, A.B. Metal Products Ltd, Glamorgan.
- Ernest William Lucas, Sub-Commander, Birmingham Special Constabulary.
- Lilian Edith Lynex, Street Savings Group Collector, Bournemouth.
- John McClelland, Senior Foreman, Short Brothers & Harland Ltd, Belfast. (Holywood.)
- John Ewan MacDonell, Workshop Superintendent III, Post Office Garage, Oban, Argyll.
- John MacKenzie, Foreman of Works, HM Prison, Perth.
- Roderick McLean, Bus Driver, Edinburgh Corporation Transport Department.
- Donald McQuistan, Technical Officer Grade II, Ministry of Public Building and Works. (Portsmouth.)
- Thomas McWaters, Head of Spare Gear Department, British Polar Engines Ltd, Glasgow.
- Ralph Edward Maw, Technician Class II, North Eastern Region, British Railways Board. (Wakefield.)
- Hilda Constance May, Chief Supervisor (F), Telephone Exchange, Wolverhampton, General Post Office.
- William Henry Meldon, Sergeant, Metropolitan Police Force. (London W.11.)
- Eustace Middleton, Clothing Organiser, S.E. Suffolk, Women's Voluntary Service. (Ipswich.)
- William Millar, Honorary Commandant, Langside Company, St. Andrew's Ambulance Association, Glasgow.
- David John Mills, Process and General Supervisory III, Royal Ordnance Factory, Burghfield, Ministry of Aviation.
- William Wilson Mitchell, Chief Inspector and Deputy Chief Constable, Airdrie Burgh Police.
- James Moore, Chief Officer, Class I, HM Prison, Belfast.
- Alexander William Morgan, Foreman G.E.C. (Telecommunications) Ltd, Middlesbrough.
- Mabel Alice Moss, Street Savings Group Collector, Woodford Bridge, Essex.
- Horace Edwin Mould, DSM, Technical Officer Grade III, Foreign Office.
- Joshua Murphy, JP, Metal Worker, Pressed Steel Co. Ltd, Cowley.
- William James North, Inspector, General Post Office, Aylesbury.
- Harold Gates, Foreman (Construction), Wetherby District, No. 4 (Leeds) Sub-Area, Yorkshire Electricity Board.
- Robert Albert Orr, Lately Sub-Postmaster, Newtownstewart S.O, Omagh, Co. Tyrone.
- Catherine Emma Packer, Member, Women's Voluntary Service, Kesteven.
- Denis Pain, Volunteer-in-Charge, Auxiliary Coastguard Station, Sandown, Isle of Wight.
- Albert Charles Isaac Palmer, Scientific Assistant, Royal Naval Hospital, Plymouth, Ministry of Defence (Navy).
- William Henry Parker, Assistant Roadlayer, Mansfield Colliery, East Midlands Division, National Coal Board.
- Annie Gladys Parkin, Street Savings Group Collector, Meltham, Huddersfield.
- William Ernest Paskin, Substation Attendant, Smethwick/West Bromwich District, Midlands Electricity Board. (Birmingham.)
- Joseph Stanley Payne, Chief Steward, SS Esso Canterbury, Esso Petroleum Co. Ltd. (Liverpool.)
- Julian Pearmain, Engineering Inspector (Mechanical), Port of London Authority. (Hayes, Kent.)
- Edward Pears, Farm Steward, Cockle Park, University of Newcastle's Experimental Farm, Northumberland.
- Norman Burton Powell, Divisional Commandant, Manchester City Special Constabulary.
- Ivor Albert Price, Colliery Training Officer, Elliot Colliery, South Western Division, National Coal Board. (New Tredegar.)
- Elsie Florence Overton Proudman, Centre Organiser, Devizes, Women's Voluntary Services.
- Eric Mephan Read, Engine Fitter, HM Dockyard, Chatham, Ministry of Defence (Navy).(Sheerness.)
- Stanley James Reece, Boatswain, SS Hemisinus, Shell Tankers (U.K.) Ltd. (Cardiff.)
- James Rehill, Chief Observer, Post 31/H3, Royal Observer Corps. (Armagh.)
- Glynne Stafford Reynolds, Remedial Gymnast, Industrial Rehabilitation Unit, Cardiff, Ministry of Labour.
- Agnes Patricia Richardson, Assistant Group Officer, Birmingham Fire Brigade. (Sutton Coldfield.)
- Alfred George Riches, Watcher-Constable, Board of Customs and Excise. (Margate, Kent.)
- Florence Sarah Robinson, Group Leader, Shropshire Branch, British Red Cross Society. (Ludlow.)
- Thomas Henry Roebuck, Postal and Telegraph Officer, Head Post Office, Bournemouth.
- William Stanley Rogers, Technical Grade II, Ministry of Public Building and Works. (Chippenham, Wilts.)
- Thomas Round, Foreman Bricklayer, The Patent Shaft Steel Works Ltd. (Wednesbury.)
- William Charles Rowlands, Pumpman, MV Regent Eagle, General Service Contracts. (Bristol.)
- Ellis Rowley, Resident Chargehand, Cornelius Sykes, Oldham. (Chadderton.)
- John Schofield, Chargehand and Fitter, Whipp & Bourne Ltd, Rochdale. (Heywood.)
- Vernon Arthur Secker, Senior Scientific Assistant, Ministry of Agriculture, Fisheries and Food. (Cambridge.)
- Joseph Sheriff, Foreman Fitter, Ballylumford Power Station, Electricity Board for Northern Ireland. (Islandmagee.)
- Walter Ernest Simmons, Technician, Signal and Telecommunications Engineering Department, Bexhill Central, British Railways Board.
- Dudley Dundonald Smith, Constable, Royal Botanic Gardens, Kew, Ministry of Agriculture, Fisheries and Food. (Richmond, Surrey.)
- Ernest Snape, Leading Technical Officer, Midland Telephone Exchange, Birmingham, General Post Office.
- Russell Snelling, Station Officer, Norfolk Fire Brigade. (Thetford.)
- Norman Leslie Spring, Outside Foreman, Plenty & Son Ltd, Newbury, Berks.
- Charles Squires, Chief Petty Officer Instructor and Caretaker Avonmouth Unit, Sea Cadet Corps. (Bristol.)
- Montague Alfred Squires, Bailiff and Summoning Officer to the High Sheriff of Cambridgeshire and Huntingdonshire. (Cambridge.)
- Edith Stevenson, Assembler 'A', Royal Ordnance Factory, Blackburn, Ministry of Defence (Army).
- Reginald William Stokes, Special Craftsman, Aeroplane and Armament Experimental Establishment, Boscombe Down, Ministry of Aviation.
- Douglas John Thompson, Storeman I, School of Artillery, Ministry of Defence (Army). (Amesbury.)
- Gilbert Thomson, Coast Preventive Man, Board of Customs and Excise. (Shetland Islands.)
- Charles Henry Thornett, Higher Grade Draughtsman, Ordnance Survey, Southampton.
- Hilda Sarah Thurston, Forewoman, HM Stationery Office. (Northolt, Middlesex.)
- Frederick Claude Toplis, Station Officer, Auxiliary Fire Service, Sheffield.
- Mary Ure, Collector, National Savings Groups, Glasgow.
- Doris Vaux, Centre Organiser Filey U.D. and Bridlington RD, Women's Voluntary Service.
- Henry Bellett Vernon, Sector Warden, Civil Defence Corps, Derbyshire. (Whaley Bridge.)
- Arthur George Wait, JP, Sub-Postmaster, Croesyceiliog TSO, Cwmbran, Monmouthshire.
- Jack Watkin, Principal Photographer, Princess Mary's RAF Hospital, Halton, Ministry of Defence (Air Force).
- Bob Watling, Chief Permanent Way Inspector, Ipswich District, British Railways Board.
- George Lane Webb, Prepayment Foreman, Bristol District, South Western Gas Board.
- Frederick Ernest Welham, Governor Maintenance Fitter, Mansfield District, East Midlands Gas Board. (Sutton-in-Ashfield.)
- Robert Charles Weller, Technical Officer, London Telecommunications Region, South West Area, General Post Office. (Redhill, Surrey.)
- Thomas Wells, Leading Hand Bunkerman, Round Oak Steel Works Ltd. (Brierley Hill.)
- Walter Thomas White, Foreman Compositor, Office of the Receiver for the Metropolitan Police District. (London W.4.)
- George Edward Whitehead, Surface Worker, Madeley Wood Colliery, West Midlands Division, National Coal Board. (Dawley.)
- Robert Reginald Whitsitt, Sergeant, Royal Ulster Constabulary. (Londonderry.)
- Thomas James Willets, Production Electric Welder, Joseph Sankey & Sons Ltd, Hadley, Shropshire.
- Donald Arthur George Williams, Works Technical Grade II, Shinfield Park, Ministry of Public Building and Works.
- Alta Wilson, Village Representative, Newcastleton, Roxburghshire, Women's Voluntary Service.
- Arthur Wilson. For services to the sick and disabled at Harrogate.
- Henry Thomas Windsor, Caretaker, Alderman Blaxhill Secondary Modern School, Colchester.
- James Albert Woolham, Postal and Telegraph Officer, Mount Pleasant, Central Post Office. (London W.C.1.)
- Minnie Violet Woolley, Catering Manageress "B" National Gas Turbine Establishment, Farnborough, Ministry of Aviation. (Weybridge, Surrey.)

Overseas Territories

- Mohamed Yassin, Sergeant Major of Customs Guards, Federal Department of Customs and Excise, Aden.
- Mary Alice Payne, Matron, Leper Home, Antigua.
- Seleme Letsebe Sejoe, Stock Inspector, Agricultural and Veterinary Departments, Bechuanaland.
- Luke Vukivuki, Leading hand boiler maker, Public Works Department, Fiji.
- Farmara Bassibuckari Sagnia, Area Council Treasurer, Gambia.
- Thomas Wells, Chief Electrician, Carriacou Electricity Power Station, Grenada.
- Lo Wai-sun, Foreman Class I, Urban Services Department, Hong Kong.
- Marie Gregoire Pierre Huron, Senior Health Inspector, Ministry of Health, Mauritius.
- Leon Beaubrun, Agricultural Assistant, Department of Agriculture, Saint Lucia.
- Sister Anselma Egan, Inspector of Schools, Seychelles.
- Joe Abner, Driver, Government House, Swaziland.
- Te Buaka Kanoa of Makin, Magistrate for Makin, Gilbert and Ellice Islands Colony, Western Pacific.

State of Western Australia

- Edwin Stanley Craft, Organist and Choirmaster, Wesley Church, Perth. For services to music.
- Mavis Taylor Fuller, Deputy Matron, Fremantle Public Hospital.
- Thomas Powell, Manager, Western Australian Honey Pool.
- Alfred Arthur Robertson, JP. For services in the field of immigration and youth welfare.
- Flora Margaret Tait. Lately Superintendent of Infants and Kindergartens, Education Department.
- Arthur Albert Taylor. For services to the aged and sick.

Southern Rhodesia

- Thompson Michell, Senior Road Overseer, Ministry of Roads and Road Traffic.
- Joseph Bob Litana, Chief Officer, Mpongwe Rural Council. (Dated 23 October 1964).

=== Royal Victorian Medal (RVM) ===
In Silver

- Yeoman Bed Goer Arthur Adams, Her Majesty's Bodyguard of the Yeomen of the Guard.
- John Richard Appleby.
- Ernest George Gearing.
- Chief Engine Room Artificer Victor George Jelley, P/MX 52248.
- Henry Charles Laing.
- Patrick Robert Harry Marshall.
- Leonard Charles Owen.
- Charles William Payne.
- Chief Electrical Artificer Terence Edwin John Phillips, P/MX 55252.
- Inspector Robert Thomas Henry Smith, Metropolitan Police.
- Frank John Tilly.

=== Royal Red Cross (RRC) ===
- Lieutenant-Colonel Mary Philippa Anacleta Albrecht, ARRC, (206009), Queen Alexandra's Royal Army Nursing Corps.
- Lieutenant-Colonel Mary Madelaine Winny, ARRC, (252066), Queen Alexandra's Royal Army Nursing Corps.
- Acting Wing Officer Barbara Holt (405527), Princess Mary's Royal Air Force Nursing Service.

==== Associate of the Royal Red Cross (ARRC) ====
- Margaret Elizabeth Collins, Superintending Sister, Queen Alexandra's Royal Naval Nursing Service.
- Major Beryl Jones (353163), Queen Alexandra's Royal Army Nursing Corps.
- Major Marie Waddington (384988), Queen Alexandra's Royal Army Nursing Corps.
- Squadron Officer Joan Metcalfe (406739), Princess Mary's Royal Air Force Nursing Service.

=== Air Force Cross (AFC) ===
Royal Air Force

Bar to Air Force Cross

- Squadron Leader Charles Taylor, AFC, (4076381).
- Squadron Leader Ivor Bennett Webster, AFC, (1890026), (Retired).

Air Force Cross

- Wing Commander John Moreton Nicholls, DFC, (58144).
- Squadron Leader Brian William Lavender, (3516265).
- Squadron Leader John Michael Leary (2608147).
- Squadron Leader Peter John Hector Lewis (2513089).
- Squadron Leader Peter Gifford Sawyer (3046032).
- Flight Lieutenant Denys Mobberley (3050453).
- Flight Lieutenant Philip Trevor Taylor (2380634).
- Flight Lieutenant Reginald William Llandaff Trewenack (502225).

=== Air Force Medal (AFM) ===
- 4048404 Sergeant Anthony Forster Charlton.

=== Queen's Commendation for Valuable Service in the Air ===
Royal Navy

- Lieutenant Commander Morris John Hedges, AFC.
- Lieutenant Commander Paul Millett, DSC.

Royal Air Force

- Wing Commander John William King, DFC, DFM, (139635).
- Wing Commander David Charles Saunders, OBE, AFC, (125573).
- Squadron Leader Douglas George Cameron (024862), Royal Australian Air Force.
- Squadron Leader Howard Currie (180137).
- Squadron Leader Ian Alexander Leinster (2600956).
- Squadron Leader John David Victor Macpherson (1826318).
- Squadron Leader Dennis Gordon Slade (3116005).
- Squadron Leader John Riley Whittam (607454).
- Squadron Leader Robert Arthur Whyte (583134).
- Squadron Leader Ronald Charles Wood (607161).
- Flight Lieutenant Henry Nicholas John, DFM, (177590).
- Flight Lieutenant John Ignatius Ludden (1796211).
- Flight Lieutenant John Eric Charles Mayes (2620202).
- Flight Lieutenant Francis William Gordon Meadows (181428).
- Flight Lieutenant Anthony Edward Pearce (585221).
- Flight Lieutenant Donald Gordon Riches (2735684).
- Flight Lieutenant Frederick Bryan Rickards (582904).
- Flight Lieutenant Allan Thornton Scorey (3509022).
- Flight Lieutenant Francis James William Stevens (3037372).
- Flight Lieutenant Eric MacRae Stewart (3020289).
- Flight Lieutenant Ronald Henry Stubbs (167228).
- Flight Lieutenant Charles Brian Warr (195533).
- Flying Officer Terence John Peet (4230629).
- Master Pilot Sidney Jack Brookfield (1391676).
- 4189009 Sergeant Robert Graham Burney.

United Kingdom

- Captain Philip Norman Daymon, Senior Captain, British United Airways.
- Richard Dickinson, DFC, Chief Test Pilot, Flight Refuelling Ltd, Tarrant Rushton Airfield, Dorset.
- Captain Henry Victor Hubbard, Senior Captain, First Class, British European Airways Corporation.
- Richard Michael Oliver, Chief Test Pilot, Hawker Siddeley Aviation Ltd, Hawker Blackburn Division (Gnat Section), Dunsfold.
- Squadron Leader Leslie Victor Worsdell, DFC, Chief Pilot and Aerodrome Manager, Marshalls of Cambridge.
- Captain Ernest Richard Wright, Senior Captain, First Class, British European Airways Corporation.

=== Queen's Police Medal (QPM) ===
England and Wales

- Kenneth Mortimer Wherly, Chief Constable, Cornwall Constabulary.
- John Cyprian Nightingale, BEM, Chief Constable, Essex Constabulary.
- Richard Riley Bibby, Chief Constable, Blackburn Borough Police.
- Stanley William Morris, Chief Constable, Rotherham Borough Police.
- James Haughton, Assistant Chief Constable, Staffordshire Constabulary (seconded as Head of Home Office Police Research and Planning Branch).
- Stanley Porter, Assistant Chief Constable, Coventry City Police.
- Thomas Norman Threlfall, Chief Superintendent, Lancashire Constabulary.
- Winifred Theodora Barker, Chief Superintendent, Metropolitan Police.
- Thomas Edward Pescod, Superintendent and Deputy Chief Constable, South Shields Borough Police.
- Ernest John Williams, Detective Superintendent, Metropolitan Police.
- Roy Newman Moules, Superintendent, Plymouth City Police.
- George Francis Ould, Superintendent, Metropolitan Police.

Scotland

- Duncan Urquhart, Chief Superintendent, Edinburgh City Police.
- William Pringle, Superintendent, Fife Constabulary.

Northern Ireland

- Robert Hyndman, Head Constable, Royal Ulster Constabulary.

State of Queensland

- Francis Erich Bischof, MVO, Commissioner of Police, Queensland Police Force.
- James Edward Donovan, Deputy Commissioner of Police, Queensland Police Force.
- Edwin Mark Anthony, Commissioner's Inspector, Queensland Police Force.
- Frederick Palethorpe, Commissioner's Inspector, Queensland Police Force.
- Edwin Hird, Inspector of Police, Queensland Police Force.
- William John Cronau, Inspector of Police, Queensland Police Force.

State of South Australia

- Eric William Hender, Inspector, South Australia Police Force.
- John Francis Cawley, Inspector, South Australia Police Force.

Nigeria

- Arthur Stacey Barham, Chief Superintendent, Nigeria Police Force.

Kenya

- John Harry Baker, Acting Senior Assistant Commissioner, Kenya Police Force.

Southern Rhodesia

- Stanley Edwards, Senior Assistant Commissioner, British South Africa Police Force.

Northern Rhodesia

- John Denis Orme Bird, MBE, Assistant Commissioner, Northern Rhodesia Police Force. (Dated 23 October 1964).

Overseas Territories

- George Charles Albert Lavell, OBE, Deputy Commissioner of Police, Bahamas.
- Lieutenant Colonel James Thomas Atherstone Bailey, OBE, Commissioner of Police, Bechuanaland Protectorate.
- Alexander Morrison, Senior Superintendent of Police, Hong Kong.

=== Queen's Fire Services Medal (QFSM) ===
England and Wales

- John Kelly, Divisional Officer (Deputy Chief Officer), Stoke-on-Trent Fire Brigade.
- Ronald French, MBE, Chief Officer, Leeds Fire Brigade.
- Frank Taylor, Chief Officer, Liverpool Fire Brigade.
- James Ellis, MBE, Chief Officer, Essex Fire Brigade.
- Barrie Albert Walter Mortley, Divisional Officer (Deputy Chief Officer), Flintshire Fire Brigade.

State of New South Wales

- Herbert Raymond Barber, Chief Officer, New South Wales Fire Brigade.
- William Edward O'Reilly, Superintendent, New South Wales Fire Brigade.
- Harold Hunter, Shannon, Superintendent, New South Wales Fire Brigade.
- Ambrose Harold Mallam, District Officer, New South Wales Fire Brigade.
- Reginald George McLean, Captain, New South Wales Volunteer Fire Brigade.
- William Henry Reeve, Captain, New South Wales Volunteer Fire Brigade.
- Albert Ernest Hutton, Captain, New South Wales Volunteer Fire Brigade.

State of South Australia

- John Wilford Whitbread, Fireman, South Australia Fire Brigade.

Overseas Territories

- Albert George Bradford, Chief Fire Officer, Barbados.
- Lubert Francis Watkins, Chief Fire Officer, British Guiana.

=== Colonial Police Medal (CPM) ===
Northern Rhodesia (Dated 23 October 1964)

- Wilfred Robert Allen, Superintendent, Northern Rhodesia Police Force.
- Anthony Burney, Superintendent, Northern Rhodesia Police Force.
- Brian Gregory Coase, Superintendent, Northern Rhodesia Police Force.
- Reginald Francis Edward Dew, Senior Superintendent, Northern Rhodesia Police Force.
- John Trevor Edwards, Senior Superintendent, Northern Rhodesia Police Force.
- Numero Jere, Constable, Northern Rhodesia Police Force.
- Matthews Masiye Lungu, Detective Constable, Northern Rhodesia Police Force.
- Rightwell Mhango, Constable, Northern Rhodesia Police Force.
- Robert Armistice Ockwell, Senior Superintendent, Northern Rhodesia Police Force.
- John Dennis Rowan, Senior Superintendent, Northern Rhodesia Police Force.
- Robert Stafford Taylor, Acting Assistant Commissioner, Northern Rhodesia Police Force.
- Owen Tembo, Constable, Northern Rhodesia Police Force.
- Douglas Wilmott Waters, Superintendent, Northern Rhodesia Police Force.
- Davison Zulu, Sub-Inspector, Northern Rhodesia Police Force.

Southern Rhodesia

- Joseph, No. 10572, Station Sergeant, British South Africa Police.
- Chayipa Cephas Mandigorah, Station Sergeant, British South Africa Police.
- Moyo Mandishona, Sergeant, British South Africa Police.
- Matthew George Ogle, Superintendent, British South Africa Police.
- Colin John Sowter, Chief Superintendent, British South Africa Police.
- James Oliver Watkins, Chief Superintendent, British South Africa Police.
- Douglas William Wright, Chief Superintendent, British South Africa Police.

Overseas Territories

- Hugh Saunders Bailey, Senior Superintendent, Aden Police Force.
- Paul Arthur Britton, Detective Superintendent, British Guiana Police Force.
- Oscar Edward Carmichael, Superintendent, British Guiana Police Force.
- Chan Kam-fat, Sergeant, Hong Kong Police Force.
- Chan Wai-man, Superintendent, Hong Kong Police Force.
- Peter Gordon Freeman, Assistant Superintendent, Swaziland Police Force.
- Derek Roy Harris, Superintendent, Hong Kong Police Force.
- Herbert Thomas John Hutchins, Divisional Officer, Fire Services, Hong Kong.
- Ian Ross Jack, Chief Inspector, Hong Kong Police Force.
- Archibald Junor, Sergeant, British Guiana Police Force.
- Kuo Hai-su, Staff Sergeant II, Hong Kong Police Force.
- Sibonagaye Langwenya, Sub-Inspector, Swaziland Police Force.
- James Alexander Lennan, Assistant Superintendent, British Honduras Police Force.
- Liu Fai, Principal Fireman, Fire Services, Hong Kong.
- Fadle Nassir Maisari, Deputy Superintendent, Aden Police Force.
- Albert Joel Miller, MBE, Assistant Commissioner, Bahamas Police Force.
- Stanley Riddell Moir, Assistant Commissioner, Bahamas Police Force.
- Matthew O'Sullivan, Superintendent, Hong Kong Police Force.
- Bertram St. John, Inspector, British Guiana Police Force.
- Arnold Oscar Thomas, Superintendent, British Guiana Police Force.
- Salathiel Hervey Thompson, Deputy Superintendent, Bahamas Police Force.
- Robert Leycester Waggitt, Senior Superintendent, Aden Police Force.

== Australia ==
=== Knight Bachelor ===
- Professor Thomas MacFarland Cherry, of Parkville, Victoria. For his outstanding services to science.
- Professor Stephen Henry Roberts, CMG, Vice-Chancellor of the University of Sydney, New South Wales.
- James Vernon, CBE, of Double Bay, New South Wales. For services to commerce and industry in Australia.

=== Order of the Bath ===
==== Companion of the Order of the Bath (CB) ====
Military Division

- Rear Admiral Alan Wedel Ramsay McNicoll, CBE, GM.

=== Order of Saint Michael and Saint George ===
==== Knight Grand Cross of the Order of St Michael and St George (GCMG) ====
- The Right Honourable Sir Garfield Edward John Barwick, QC, Chief Justice of the High Court of the Commonwealth of Australia.

==== Companion of the Order of St Michael and St George (CMG) ====
- Ernest Edward Dunlop, OBE, MS, FRCS, of Toorak, Victoria. For services to medicine.
- The Most Reverend Hugh Rowlands Gough, OBE, TD, Primate of the Church of England in Australia.
- John Gunther, OBE, MB, BS, Assistant Administrator of the Territory of Papua and New Guinea.
- Professor Edgar Samuel John King, MD, MS, of Toorak, Victoria. For his contribution to medical knowledge.

=== Order of the British Empire ===
==== Knight Commander of the Order of the British Empire (KBE) ====
Civil Division

- Sir (William) Keith Hancock, Professor of History, Institute of Advanced Studies, Australian National University, Canberra.
- Sir Roland Wilson, CBE, Secretary, Department of the Treasury, Canberra.

==== Commander of the Order of the British Empire (CBE) ====
Military Division

- Captain Jack Station Mesley, MVO, DSC, Royal Australian Navy.
- Major-General Paul Alfred Cullen, DSO, ED, (275618), Australian Regular Army.
- Group Captain Edwin Glen Fyfe, DSO, Royal Australian Air Force.

Civil Division

- Raymond George Baxter, of Glen Iris, Victoria. For public services.
- Edward Alfred Charles Chambers, Commonwealth Public Service Arbitrator.
- Charles Roger Darvall, of Toorak, Victoria. For services to banking and commerce.
- Allan James Eastman, OBE, Senior External Affairs Representative, Australian High Commission, London.
- Sydney Randal Heymanson, OBE. For his services to the Australian-American Association.
- William Lionel Moss, of Camberwell, Victoria. For services to primary industry and commerce.
- Alan George Turner, Clerk of the Australian House of Representatives.

==== Officer of the Order of the British Empire (OBE) ====
Military Division

- Captain Frederick William Purves, Royal Australian Navy.
- Colonel Richard Arthur Blackburn (435513), Royal Australian Infantry Corps.
- Lieutenant-Colonel Wilfred Jabez Lawes (3140), Royal Australian Army Medical Corps.
- Colonel Geoffrey David Solomon (2132), Australian Staff Corps.
- Squadron Leader Francis James Montgomery, AFC, (03384), Royal Australian Air Force.
- Squadron Leader Walter Lance Owens (03184), Royal Australian Air Force.

Civil Division

- Arthur Brayton Anderson, MB, ChB, Director of Medical Services, Repatriation Department, New South Wales.
- Thomas Vincent Brunskill, of Wagga Wagga, New South Wales. For services to primary industry in Australia.
- Henry John Crothers, of Dirranbandi, Queensland. For services to primary industry and the Community.
- Leslie Bartlett Davies, of Glen Iris, Victoria. For his services as a founder member of the Institute of Patent Attorneys of Australia.
- Alexander Thomas Dick, Senior Principal Research Scientist, Division of Animal Health, Commonwealth Scientific and Industrial Research Organisation.
- Norman Wesley Drummond, of Artarmon, New South Wales. For services in the field of social welfare.
- James Biggam Douglas Galbraith, MD, FRACP, of Mount Eliza, Victoria. For services to medicine.
- John Hugh Garrett, First Assistant Secretary, Banking, Trade and Industry Branch, Department of the Treasury, Canberra.
- James Murray Gosper, of Lindfield, New South Wales. For services to the building and construction industry.
- Frederick Raynor Gullick, Australian Senior Government Trade Commissioner and Charge d'Affaires at Stockholm.
- John Ackland Holt, MB, ChM of Griffith, Canberra. For services to the community.
- Peter James Lawler, Deputy Secretary, Prime Minister's Department, Canberra.
- James Francis Litchfield, of Cooma, New South Wales. For services to the sheep breeding industry.
- Colin Archibald McPhail, MB, BS, of Tweed River, New South Wales. For services to the Australian sugar industry.
- Melville Henry Marshall, of Sandringham, Victoria. For public services.
- Arthur Malcolm Morris. Acting Assistant Secretary, Department of External Affairs, Canberra.
- Thomas Miles Owen, Associate Registrar, Australian National University, Canberra.
- Douglas Fieldew Pratt, of Vaucluse, New South Wales. For services to Australian art.
- Noel Pryde, MM, President of the Guide Dogs for the Blind Association of Australia.
- Alan Philip Renouf, Australian Minister at Washington.
- William Turner Sumner, Deputy Secretary, Department of Supply, Melbourne.

==== Member of the Order of the British Empire (MBE) ====
Military Division

- Lieutenant Commander Kenneth Alick Douglas, Royal Australian Navy.
- Electrical Lieutenant Robert John Mowday, Royal Australian Navy.
- 52528 Warrant Officer Class II Harold William Busby, Royal Australian Infantry Corps.
- 21874 Warrant Officer Class II Donald Martin, Royal Australian Engineers.
- 261675 Warrant Officer Class II Reginald Napper, Royal Australian Infantry Corps.
- Lieutenant Arthur Lambert Schaschke (18551), Australian Staff Corps.
- Major Clarence Harry Smith (3129042), Royal Australian Armoured Corps.
- Major (temporary) Barry Ross Tinkler (235076), Australian Staff Corps.
- 33949 Warrant Officer Class I Francis Symon White, Royal Australian Survey Corps.
- Acting Squadron Leader Keith Joseph Munday (0216024), Royal Australian Air Force.
- Flight Lieutenant Raymond Hawes (022146), Royal Australian Air Force.
- Warrant Officer Lawrence Giles (A2572), Royal Australian Air Force.

Civil Division

- Charles James Avery, Assistant Superintendent (Education and Welfare), Personnel Branch, Postmaster-General's Department, New South Wales.
- Alfred Ernest Bowmaker, of Leeton, New South Wales. For services to primary industry.
- Winifred Mary Cave, of Strathfield, New South Wales. For services to the community.
- Kathleen Beatrice Crisp, Director of Social Work, Department of Social Services, Victoria.
- Florence Victoria Davis, of Berrigan, New South Wales. For services to the community.
- Elizabeth Catherine Fraser, of Parramatta, New South Wales. For services in the field of social welfare.
- Charles Horace Fuelling, Assistant Superintendent (Personnel), Postmaster-General's Department, Queensland.
- Albert Arthur Patrick Hawes, Sectional Aircraft Surveyor, Department of Civil Aviation, Perth, Western Australia.
- John Heffernan, Manager, Finance Division, Head Office, Australian Services Canteens Organisation.
- Agnes Esther Hillman, of Murwillumbah, New South Wales. For services to the community.
- Carl Alfred Jeppesen, of North Bondi, New South Wales. For services to local government and the community.
- William Johnston, Senior Programmer, Department of Air, Canberra.
- The Reverend Brother Benildus Joseph, of Katoomba, New South Wales. For services to education.
- James Gregory Gillies Kelleher, Assistant Director, Health Department, Sydney, New South Wales.
- Stanley Kinglet, Assistant Inspector, Organisations, Methods and Classifications Branch, Public Service Board, Canberra.
- Gustaf William Larsson, Assistant Director (Engineering), Postmaster-General's Department, Tasmania.
- Raymond Russell Lindwall, of Brisbane, Queensland. For services to cricket.
- Councillor Theodore Charles Macaw, of Wanganella, New South Wales. For public services.
- Ada Florence Rose McKellar, JP, of Hornsby, New South Wales. For social welfare services.
- Leonard Norman Macleod, Commonwealth Analyst, Department of Customs and Excise, Victoria.
- James Arthur Morrison, of Turramurra, New South Wales. For public services.
- Norman Francis Nelson, of Ashgrove, Queensland. For services in the field of youth welfare.
- Christopher Normoyle, of Randwick, New South Wales. For services to the Administration of the Territory of Papua and New Guinea.
- William Herbert Pedersen, Chief of the Photographic Section, News and Information Bureau, Canberra.
- Barbara Ramsden, of Melbourne, Victoria. For services to literature.
- Charles Laurence Rand, JP, of Somerset, Tasmania. For public services.
- Edwin Joseph Truman Symonds, Assistant Director (Engineering), Postmaster-General's Department, South Australia.
- Mary Josephine Threlfall, Matron, Repatriation General Hospital, Greenslopes, Queensland.
- Vin ToBaining, of Rabaul. For services to the Administration of the Territory of Papua and New Guinea.
- Kathleen Tweedy, Senior Nursing Sister, Blood Transfusion Service, Territory of Papua and New Guinea.
- Dorothy Jean Wardlaw, of Balwyn, Victoria. For services to the community, particularly in connection with the Young Women's Christian Association of Australia.
- Kathleen Janet Welsh, of Norfolk Island. In recognition of her services to the care of the aged.

=== British Empire Medal (BEM) ===
Military Division

Royal Australian Navy

- Chief Air Artificer William Henry Butler, ONR 31308.
- Chief Electrician (Weapons Electronics) Noel Charles Nugent, ONR 37057.
- Stores Chief Petty Officer (V) Donald Arthur Lee Rosser, ONR 22225.

Australian Military Forces

- 27986 Sergeant Raymond Harvey, Royal Australian Army Service Corps.
- 32188 Sergeant Bryan Stanislaus Hussey, Royal Australian Engineers.
- 4700 Sergeant Kenneth Joseph Mazzarol, Royal Australian Survey Corps.
- 420486 Warrant Officer Class II (temporary) George Grenville Spencer, DCM, Royal Australian Infantry Corps.
- 345808 Staff-Sergeant Aubrey George Stevens, Royal Australian Army Service Corps.
- 52636 Sergeant Roy Leslie Weir, Royal Australian Infantry Corps.

Royal Australian Air Force

- A5123 Flight Sergeant Donald Piper.
- A33786 Sergeant Llewellyn Cedric Denning.
- W218434 Leading Aircraftwoman Enid Estelle Hope, Women's Royal Australian Air Force.

Civil Division

- George Bundy, Chauffeur, Australian Embassy, Paris.
- Robert Thomas Humbly Colborne, lately Acting Supervising Examiner, Department of the Navy, Sydney.
- Alexander Cuthbertson, Personal Attendant to the President of the Senate.
- Mary Frances Elliott, Public Relations Officer, Postmaster-General's Department, Victoria.
- Malcolm Norman Gleeson, Officer in Charge, Unit Account Section, Master General of the Ordnance Branch, Army Headquarters.
- Harry O'Bree, Guard Messenger, Australian Embassy, Washington.
- William George Ogle, Senior Furniture Officer, Department of Works, New South Wales.
- Anne Martha Pollock, Postmistress, Golspie, New South Wales.
- Harold Schuldt, Welfare Officer and former President, Footscray, Returned Servicemen's League.
- Alfred Ernest Tarrant, Superintendent, Roads, Bridges and Aerodromes, Department of Works, Canberra.
- John Patrick Walsh, President, Bankstown and District Civil Rehabilitation Committee.
- Arthur William Clement Windover, Production Planning Superintendent, Trans Australia Airlines.

=== Royal Red Cross (RRC) ===
==== Associate of the Royal Red Cross (ARRC) ====
- Lieutenant-Colonel Sheila Isobel Robb (F.22801), Royal Australian Army Nursing Corps.
- Major Therese Alacoque Kinane (F.51), Royal Australian Army Nursing Corps.

=== Air Force Cross (AFC) ===
Royal Australian Air Force

- Group Captain Arthur Edward Mather, DFC.
- Squadron Leader Billie Hicks Collings (034495).
- Squadron Leader Vance Drummond (033624).
- Flight Lieutenant Jack Robert Boast (014165).

=== Queen's Commendation for Valuable Service in the Air ===
Royal Australian Air Force

- Squadron Leader Raymond Ian Parkin (033183).
- Flight Lieutenant Ernest Robert Jones (032871).
- Flight Lieutenant Donald James Lancaster (0212916).
- A24468 Flight Sergeant Maurice David Bates.
- A32213 Flight Sergeant Geoffrey Raymond Johansen.
- A21471 Acting Flight Sergeant Keith Stanley Wadling.

== Sierra Leone ==
=== Order of the British Empire ===
==== Commander of the Order of the British Empire (CBE) ====
Military Division

- Brigadier Ronald Dryden Blackie, DSO, OBE (49795), late Infantry; Commander, Royal Sierra Leone Military Forces.

==== Officer of the Order of the British Empire (OBE) ====
Civil Division

- Lloyd George Akindele Beckley, Accountant-General.
- Leslie William Leigh, MVO, Commissioner of Police.
- Adeyemi Frank Tuboku-Metzger, MRCS, LRCP, Senior Physician Specialist, Ministry of Health.

==== Member of the Order of the British Empire (MBE) ====
Military Division

- 3122386 Warrant Officer Class I Thomas Michael Patrick Moore, Royal Army Ordnance Corps; on loan to the Government of Sierra Leone.

Civil Division

- Amy Mojibola Adams, Proprietor and Matron, Dr. Pratt's Memorial Maternity Home, Freetown.
- Alvin James Kombe-Bundu, Deputy Registrar of Co-operative Societies, Ministry of Trade and Industry.
- Millicent Theresa Eleady-Cole, Matron, Hill Station Hospital, Freetown.
- Paramount Chief Bai Farnia Tass III, Magbema Chiefdom, Kambia, Northern Province.

=== British Empire Medal (BEM) ===
Civil Division

- Samuel Williamson Johnson, Laboratory Superintendent Veterinary Division, Ministry of Natural Resources.
- Momoh Sesay, Foreman Driver, Ministry of Works.

== Jamaica ==
=== Knight Bachelor ===
- Francis Moncrieff Kerr-Jarrett. For public services.

=== Order of Saint Michael and Saint George ===
==== Companion of the Order of St Michael and St George (CMG) ====
- Harold George Dundas Nosworthy, Auditor-General.

=== Order of the British Empire ===
==== Commander of the Order of the British Empire (CBE) ====
Military Division

- Brigadier Paul Edwin Crook, DSO, OBE, (68434), late Infantry; Chief of Staff, Jamaica Defence Force.

Civil Division

- Howard Roberts Sharp. For services to agriculture and the citrus industry.

==== Officer of the Order of the British Empire (OBE) ====
Military Division

- Lieutenant-Colonel Charles Arundel Murcopt Moody (sic), Commanding Officer, 3rd Battalion, Jamaica Regiment (National Reserve).

Civil Division

- Clarence Herbert Dinroe, Acting Permanent Secretary to the Prime Minister.
- Noel Norman Holmes, MB, BCh, lately Medical Officer, Jamaica Medical Service.

==== Member of the Order of the British Empire (MBE) ====
Civil Division

- Vincent Allenby Bunting, Assistant Commissioner, Jamaica Police Force.
- Eugene Alexander Hendriks, Assistant Commandant, Jamaica Special Constabulary Force.
- Lucille Morrison, President of the Jamaica Women Teachers' Federation.

=== British Empire Medal (BEM) ===
Military Division

- Staff-Sergeant Vincent Samuel Buchanan, 1st Battalion, The Jamaica Regiment.
- Corporal Herbert George Nelson, Jamaica Military Band.

== Malawi ==
=== Knight Bachelor ===
- Frederick Southworth, QC, Chief Justice of Malawi.
- Peter William Youens, CMG, OBE, Secretary to the Prime Minister.

=== Order of the British Empire ===
==== Officer of the Order of the British Empire (OBE) ====
Civil Division

- Ronald Bathurst-Brown, Commissioner for Lands.
- Alexander Stewart, Government Printer.

==== Member of the Order of the British Empire (MBE) ====
Military Division

- Major John Clark, Second-in-Command, Malawi Rifles.
