= 1970 New Year Honours =

British royal recognitions

The New Year Honours 1970 were appointments in many of the Commonwealth realms of Queen Elizabeth II to various orders and honours to reward and highlight good works by citizens of those countries. They were announced in supplements to the London Gazette of 30 December 1969 to celebrate the year passed and mark the beginning of 1970.

At this time honours for Australians were awarded both in the United Kingdom honours, on the advice of the premiers of Australian states, and also in a separate Australia honours list.

The recipients of honours are displayed here as they were styled before their new honour, and arranged by honour, with classes (Knight, Knight Grand Cross, etc.) and then divisions (Military, Civil, etc.) as appropriate.

== United Kingdom and Commonwealth ==
=== Life Peer ===
Baroness

- The Right Honourable Susan Lilian Primrose, Baroness Masham. For social services and services to disabled people.

Baron

- John Cowburn Beavan. For services to Journalism.
- Sir (Christopher) Frank Kearton, OBE, Chairman, Courtaulds Ltd. Chairman, Industrial Reorganisation Corporation, 1966–1968.
- Captain The Right Honourable Terence Marne O'Neill, DL, lately Prime Minister of Northern Ireland.

=== Privy Councillor ===
- Privy Counsellors The Right Honourable Wilfred Banks Duncan, Baron Brown, MBE, Minister of State, Board of Trade since 1965.
- Edmund Emanuel Dell, MP, Member of Parliament for Birkenhead since October 1964. Joint Parliamentary Secretary, Ministry of Technology, 1966–1967; Joint Parliamentary Under Secretary of State, Department of Economic Affairs, 1967–1968; Minister of State, Board of Trade, 1968–1969; Minister of State, Department of Employment and Productivity since October 1969.
- Sir Arthur James Irvine, QC, MP, Member of Parliament for the Edge Hill Division of Liverpool since 1947. Solicitor-General since August 1967.
- Sir Leslie Kenneth O'Brien, GBE, Governor, Bank of England.

=== Knight Bachelor ===
- Walter Adams, CMG, OBE, Director, London School of Economics and Political Science, University of London.
- Alfred Jules Ayer, Wykeham Professor of Logic, University of Oxford.
- Hubert Bennett, Architect to the Greater London Council.
- Harold Black, Secretary to the Cabinet of Northern Ireland.
- Lieutenant-Colonel James Carreras, MBE. For services to Youth.
- Dudley Ross Chesterman, Warden, Goldsmiths College, University of London.
- Noël Peirce Coward. For services to the Arts.
- Professor Keppel Archibald Cameron Creswell, CBE. For services to Archaeology in the Middle East.
- John Arthur Edwards, CBE, President, London Rent Assessment Panel.
- Ronald McLeod Fairfield, CBE, Deputy Chairman and Managing Director, British Insulated Callender's Cables Ltd. For services to Export.
- Arthur Gaitskell, CMG. For services to overseas development.
- William Frederick Glock, CBE. For services to Music.
- Sidney Francis Greene, CBE, Chairman of the General Council of the Trades Union Congress.
- Charles Herbert Stuart-Harris, CBE, MD, FRCP, Professor of Medicine, University of Sheffield.
- Professor William Rede Hawthorne, CBE. For services to Thermodynamics.
- Desmond Heap, Comptroller and City Solicitor, Corporation of the City of London.
- Charles Ronald Ironmonger, Alderman, Sheffield City Council.
- Richard Dawnay Lemon, CBE, QPM, Chief Constable, Kent County Constabulary.
- John Todd Lewis, OBE, Chairman, Birmingham Regional Hospital Board.
- Frank Milton, Chief Metropolitan Magistrate.
- Edward Grainger Muir, FRCS, LRCP, Senior Surgeon, King's College Hospital, London.
- Philip Jack Oppenheimer, Managing Director, The Diamond Trading Co. Ltd. For services to Export.
- Lionel Alexander Bethune Pilkington, Technical Director, Pilkington Brothers Ltd. For services to Technology and Export.
- Professor Leon Radzinowicz, Wolfson Professor of Criminology and Director, Institute of Criminology, University of Cambridge.
- Professor Alexander Robertson, CBE, Professor of Animal Health and Dean of the Faculty of Veterinary Medicine, University of Edinburgh.
- Frederic Seebohm, TD, Chairman, Export Guarantees Advisory Council.
- Robert Southern, CBE, General Secretary, Co-operative Union Ltd.
- Rudy Sternberg, Chairman, British Agricultural Export Council. For services to Export.
- Gwilym Tecwyn Williams, CBE, President, National Farmers' Union for England and Wales.
- Richard Dilworth Young, Chairman and Managing Director, Alfred Herbert Ltd. For services to Export.

Diplomatic Service and Overseas List

- John Ramsay Blagden, OBE, TD, lately Chief Justice, Zambia.
- Nigel Vernon Reed, CBE, Chief Justice, Northern Nigeria.
- Peter Henry Berry Otway Smithers, VRD, lately Secretary-General, Council of Europe.

State of New South Wales

- The Honourable Harry Vincent Budd, President of the Legislative Council.
- Roderick William Miller, CBE. For services to industry and commerce.

State of Victoria

- The Honourable Alistair Duncan Grant Adam, Justice, Supreme Court of Victoria.
- Edward Cohen, of Toorak. For services to the community.

State of Queensland

- Walter Beresford James Gordon Sparkes of Jandowae. For services to the beef cattle industry and to the community.

State of South Australia

- Brigadier Thomas Charles Eastick, CMG, DSO, ED. For services to ex-servicemen.
- The Honourable Glen Gardner Pearson, MP, Treasurer and Minister of Housing.

State of Tasmania

- The Honourable Marcus George Gibson, lately Senior Puisne Judge, Supreme Court of Tasmania.

=== Order of the Bath ===
==== Knight Grand Cross of the Order of the Bath (GCB) ====
Military Division

- Admiral Sir John Fitzroy Duyland Bush, KCB, DSC.
- General Sir Geoffrey Musson, KCB, CBE, DSO, (45438), late Infantry, Colonel The Light Infantry.

==== Knight Commander of the Order of the Bath (KCB) ====
Military Division

- Vice Admiral Arthur Francis Turner, CB, DSC.
- Lieutenant-General Napier Crookenden, CB, DSO, OBE, (66121), late Infantry, Colonel The Cheshire Regiment.
- Lieutenant-General Henry Lowther Ewart Clark Leask, CB, DSO, OBE, (62419), late Infantry, Colonel Commandant Scottish Division.
- Air Marshal Gareth Thomas Butler Clayton, CB, DFC, Royal Air Force.
- Air Marshal Leslie Deane Mavor, CB, AFC, Royal Air Force.

Civil Division

- John Saye Wingfield Twisleton-Wykeham-Fiennes, CB, First Parliamentary Counsel.
- Frank Edward Figgures, CB, CMG, Second Secretary, HM Treasury.
- Alan Samuel Marre, CB, Second Permanent Under-Secretary of State, Department of Health and Social Security.

==== Companion of the Order of the Bath (CB) ====
Military Division

Royal Navy

- Rear Admiral George Cunningham Leslie, OBE.
- Rear Admiral Cedric Kenelm Roberts, DSO.
- Rear Admiral Desmond Noble Callaghan.
- Rear Admiral Ian David McLaughlan, DSC.
- Rear Admiral Basil Charles Godfrey Place, VC, DSC.
- Rear Admiral John Douglas Trythall, OBE.

Army

- Major-General Anthony John Deane-Drummond, DSO, MC, (71076), late Royal Corps of Signals, Colonel Commandant Royal Corps of Signals.
- Major-General John Houghton Gibbon, OBE, (91397), late Royal Regiment of Artillery.
- Major-General Patrick Robert Chamier Hobart, DSO, OBE, MC, (73080), late Royal Armoured Corps, Colonel Commandant Royal Tank Regiment.
- Major-General Keith Fielding Stephens, OBE, QHS, MB, (72161), late Royal Army Medical Corps.
- Major-General David Noel Hugh Tyacke, OBE, (66134), late Infantry.
- The Venerable Archdeacon John Ross Youens, OBE, MC, Chaplain to The Queen (135241), Royal Army Chaplains' Department.

Royal Air Force

- The Venerable Leonard James Ashton, QHC.
- Air Vice-Marshal Harry Burton, CBE, DSO.
- Air Vice-Marshal James Clarke Taylor, OBE, QHP, MB, ChB.
- Air Commodore David Beatty Fitzpatrick, OBE, AFC.
- Air Commodore Frederick Samuel Hazlewood, CBE, AFC.

Civil Division

- Kenneth Barnes, Deputy Under-Secretary of State, Department of Employment and Productivity.
- Stuart Verdun Collins, Chief Inspector of Audit, Ministry of Housing and Local Government.
- Frank Cooper, CMG, Deputy Under-Secretary of State, Ministry of Defence.
- Alexander Currall, CMG, Director, Department for National Savings.
- John Abernethy Dickson, Director General, Forestry Commission.
- Harry Edward Drew, Director General of Quality Assurance, Ministry of Technology.
- Robert Audley Furtado, Presiding Special Commissioner, Board of Inland Revenue.
- David Francis Hubback, Under Secretary, Board of Trade.
- John William James, MRCS, LRCP, Deputy Chief Medical Adviser, Department of Health and Social Security.
- Harold Cottam Johnson, CBE, Keeper of the Public Records.
- Leonard Sidney Mills, Under Secretary, Ministry of Transport.
- Leonard Napolitan, Director of Economics and Statistics, Ministry of Agriculture, Fisheries and Food.
- Paul Randell Odgers, MBE, TD, Under Secretary, Office of the Secretary of State for Social Services.
- William George Onslow, Under Secretary, Ministry of Housing and Local Government.
- William Alan Wood, Second Crown Estate Commissioner.

=== Order of Saint Michael and Saint George ===
==== Knight Grand Cross of the Order of St Michael and St George (GCMG) ====
- Sir Christopher William Machell Cox, KCMG, Educational Adviser, Ministry of Overseas Development.
- Sir John Nicholls, KCMG, OBE, lately Her Majesty's Ambassador, Cape Town.

==== Knight Commander of the Order of St Michael and St George (KCMG) ====
- Sir Maurice Henry Parsons, Deputy Governor, Bank of England.

Diplomatic Service and Overseas List

- William Vincent John Evans, CMG, MBE, Foreign and Commonwealth Office.
- Arthur David Kemp Owen, lately Co-Administrator, United Nations Development Programme.

State of Western Australia

- Sir Lawrence Walter Jackson, Chief Justice, Western Australia.

==== Companion of the Order of St Michael and St George (CMG) ====
- Kenneth Barnes, Deputy Under-Secretary of State, Department of Employment and Productivity.
- Stuart Verdun Collins, Chief Inspector of Audit, Ministry of Housing and Local Government.
- Frank Cooper, CMG, Deputy Under-Secretary of State, Ministry of Defence.
- Alexander Currall, CMG, Director, Department for National Savings.
- John Abernethy Dickson, Director General, Forestry Commission.
- Harry Edward Drew, Director General of Quality Assurance, Ministry of Technology.
- Robert Audley Furtado, Presiding Special Commissioner, Board of Inland Revenue.
- David Francis Hubback, Under Secretary, Board of Trade.
- John William James, MRCS, LRCP, Deputy Chief Medical Adviser, Department of Health and Social Security.
- Harold Cottam Johnson, CBE, Keeper of the Public Records.
- Leonard Sidney Mills, Under Secretary, Ministry of Transport.
- Leonard Napolitan, Director of Economics and Statistics, Ministry of Agriculture, Fisheries and Food.
- Paul Randell Odgers, MBE, TD, Under Secretary, Office of the Secretary of State for Social Services.
- William George Onslow, Under Secretary, Ministry of Housing and Local Government.
- William Alan Wood, Second Crown Estate Commissioner.
- Thomas Michael Crowley, Assistant Secretary, Ministry of Technology.
- Professor John Conrad Waterlow, MD, FRCP, Director, Medical Research Council Tropical Metabolism Research Unit, Jamaica.

Diplomatic Service and Overseas List

- Conel Hugh O'Donel Alexander, CBE, Foreign and Commonwealth Office.
- John Halkett Baddeley, Foreign and Commonwealth Office.
- Alexander Hope Birch, OBE, Counsellor, British High Commission, Accra.
- Peter Antony Carter, lately Head of British Residual Mission, Salisbury.
- Arthur Denis Farrell, QC, lately Senior Puisne Judge, High Court of Kenya.
- Walter Robert Haydon, Foreign and Commonwealth Office.
- Herbert Ben Curtis Keeble, Her Majesty's Minister, British High Commission, Canberra.
- Peter Mennell, MBE, lately Counsellor, Her Majesty's Embassy, Kinshasa.
- Gordon Philo, MC, lately Her Majesty's Consul-General, Hanoi.
- Nicholas George Frederick Taylor, JP, Commissioner in the United Kingdom for Eastern Caribbean Governments.

State of Victoria

- Ernest William Coates, Director of Finance and Permanent Head, Victorian Treasury.

State of Queensland

- Norman Stewart Pixley, MBE, VRD, of Brisbane. For services to the community.

State of South Australia

- John Sampson White, JP, Secretary and Permanent Head, Premier's Department.

=== Royal Victorian Order ===
==== Dame Commander of the Royal Victorian Order (DCVO) ====
- The Right Honourable Ann Fortune, Countess of Euston, CVO, JP.

==== Knight Commander of the Royal Victorian Order (KCVO) ====
- Charles Abrahams.
- Seymour John Louis Egerton.
- John Hastings James, CB.
- Sir Joseph Thomas Molony, QC.
- The Right Honourable David Arthur Thomas, Earl of Westmorland.

==== Commander of the Royal Victorian Order (CVO) ====
- Wilfrid Greenhouse Allt, CBE.
- John Gilbert Cook, CBE, MVO.
- Group Captain Alexander Roualeyn Gordon-Cumming, Royal Air Force.
- Aydua Helen Scott-Elliot, MVO.
- Thomas Charles Birkett Hodgson, OBE, QPM.
- Alfred William Hurll, CBE.
- John Ronald Jones.
- Rosina Mary McLennan, MVO.
- Kenneth Newis, CB, MVO.
- Richard Rashleigh Shelley.
- William Digby Sturch.

==== Member of the Royal Victorian Order (MVO) ====
At this time the two lowest classes of the Royal Victorian Order were "Member (fourth class)" and "Member (fifth class)", both with post-nominal letters MVO. "Member (fourth class)" was renamed "Lieutenant" (LVO) from the 1985 New Year Honours onwards.

Fourth Class

- Squadron Leader Philip George Fearn, Royal Air Force.
- Margaret Hawksley.
- Eric Warrington Lloyd, TD.
- Arthur Charles Neal, MVO, BEM.
- Commander Michael Alan Oliver, Royal Navy.

Fifth Class

- Supply Lieutenant (O.C.A.) Albert William Baker, Royal Navy.
- Anne Mary Downes.
- Edith Mary Fisher, BEM.
- Edward Kenneth McLeod Hilleary.
- Joseph Kealey.
- Joseph Matthews.
- Gladys Ramsay.
- Leslie Gilbert Taffs.

==== Medal of the Royal Victorian Order (RVM) ====
In Silver

- Cyril Frederick Ash.
- Divisional Sergeant Major Alfred Barnstaple, Her Majesty's Bodyguard of the Yeomen of the Guard.
- Ernest Bennett.
- Sergeant Thomas Charles Briggs, CH/X 4685, Royal Marines.
- Ernest Edward Gates.
- Albert Edward Gent.
- William Cyril Hawthorn.
- Thomas Shannon Howatson.
- Police Constable Leslie Hyson, Metropolitan Police.
- William Johnson.
- Chief Communications Yeoman Albert Major, P/JX 819508.
- WO567094 Warrant Officer Robert Henry Norris, BEM, Royal Air Force.
- Norma Ivy Minnie Preece.
- M0644986 Warrant Officer Ronald Frederick Tooke, BEM, Royal Air Force.
- Herbert Thorpe Warwick Wood.

=== Order of the British Empire ===
==== Knight Grand Cross of the Order of the British Empire (GBE) ====
Civil Division

- The Right Honourable Roy Herbert, Baron Thomson of Fleet, Chairman, The Thomson Organisation Ltd.

==== Dame Commander of the Order of the British Empire (DBE) ====
Military Division

- Commandant Marion Mildred Kettlewell, CBE, Hon. ADC, Director, Women's Royal Naval Service.
- Brigadier The Honourable Mary Mackenzie Anderson, MBE, Hon. ADC, (234046), Women's Royal Army Corps.

Civil Division

- Bessie Ellen Bottomley, JP. For public and social services.
- Margaret Miles, Headmistress, Mayfield School, Putney.

==== Knight Commander of the Order of the British Empire (KBE) ====
Military Division

- Acting Air Marshal Robert Edward Craven, CB, OBE, DFC, Royal Air Force.

Civil Division

- The Right Honourable Ross Campbell, Baron Geddes, CBE, DL. For services to tourism and shipping.
- Sir Samuel Hoare, CB, lately United Kingdom Representative, United Nations Human Rights Commission.
- The Honourable Vernon Haddon Treatt, MM, QC, Chief Commissioner, City of Sydney.

==== Commander of the Order of the British Empire (CBE) ====
Military Division

Royal Navy

- Captain Eric Melrose Brown, OBE, DSC, AFC.
- Surgeon Captain Gerard Sutherland Irvine, QHS, MB, BS.
- Captain Richard Edward Roe.
- Captain Gerald Wallace Duthoit Spriggs, MBE.

Army

- Brigadier Ronald Lewis Allen, OBE, (125545), late Royal Army Ordnance Corps.
- Major-General (acting) Antony John Dyball, OBE, MC, TD, (90507), late Infantry.
- Brigadier Peter Hudson, MBE, (330952), late Infantry.
- Colonel William Lees, TD, MB, (396472), late Royal Army Medical Corps, Territorial and Army Volunteer Reserve, now R.A.R.O.
- Colonel David Alexander Keppel Legge, MBE, (67109), late Infantry.
- Brigadier Basil Anthony Bethune Taylor, MBE, (74523), late Royal Regiment of Artillery.
- Colonel Terence Michael Troy, MBE, (384047), late Infantry.
- Brigadier Henry Richard Wentworth Vernon, MBE, (73169), late Infantry.

Royal Air Force

- Acting Air Commodore Edgar George Fortescue Hill.
- Group Captain Dudley Graham Bailey.
- Group Captain Jack Alfred Bush, OBE, DFC.
- Group Captain Charles Gilbert Maughan, AFC.
- Group Captain Edward William Merriman, OBE, DFM.
- Group Captain Basil James Scandrett, AFC, for services with the British Joint Services Training Team, Ghana.
- Group Captain George William Wray Waddington, OBE, DFC.
- Group Captain Peter Greville Kaye Williamson, DFC.

Civil Division

- Arthur John Francis Andrews, Chairman, Clark Equipment Ltd. For services to Export.
- Malcolm Arnold, Composer and Conductor.
- John William Atwell, Chairman, Engineering Division, The Weir Group Ltd. For services to Export.
- Patrick Mervyn Beech, Controller, English Regions, British Broadcasting Corporation.
- David Franklyn Bevan, Mayor of the City of Swansea.
- Margaret Felicity Crosfield Bolton. For services to Education in the Commonwealth.
- Elizabeth Joyce Bradbury, Headmistress, Pennywell School, Sunderland.
- Winston Bray, Planning Director, British Overseas Airways Corporation.
- William James Bryden, Sheriff Substitute of Lanarkshire at Glasgow.
- James Carmichael, Rector, Queen Anne High School, Dunfermline.
- Robert Owen Carter, Foreign and Commonwealth Office.
- Anthony Colin Bruce Chapman, Executive Chairman, Group Lotus Car Companies Ltd. For services to Exports.
- John Charnley, FRCS, Consultant Orthopaedic Surgeon, Wrightington Hospital, Wigan.
- Christian Neils Christensen, ERD, Chairman, Road-Air-Cargo Express (International) Ltd.
- Robert James Clayton, OBE, Technical Director, The General Electric and English Electric Companies Ltd.
- Cyril Hadlow Colton, President, British Celanese Ltd. For services to the Textile Industry.
- John Crozier. For services to agriculture and rural industries in Scotland.
- The Reverend Francis Noel Davey, DD, Director, Society for Promoting Christian Knowledge.
- Captain James Lewis Dunkley, OBE, RD, Marine Superintendent, Peninsular & Oriental Steam Navigation Company.
- Elliott Manery Durham, lately Alderman, Nottingham City Council.
- John Horsfall Dyde, OBE. Chairman, Eastern Gas Board.
- Professor Kenneth Charles Edwards, Member, East Midlands Economic Planning Council.
- Victor Charles Ellison, MC, TD, Chairman, Cement Marketing Co. Ltd.
- William Frankel, JP, Editor, The Jewish Chronicle.
- Roy Broadbent Fuller, Professor of Poetry, University of Oxford.
- Dennis Gabor, Professor of Applied Electron Physics, Imperial College, University of London.
- Ronald George Gibson, OBE, FRCS, FRCGP, Chairman of the Council, British Medical Association.
- Louis Glass, MB, ChB, JP, Alderman, Birmingham City Council.
- Harold Ernest Gresham, Company Materials Engineer, Aero Engine Division, Rolls-Royce Ltd.
- Shadwell Harry Grylls, lately Technical Director, Motor Car Division, Rolls-Royce Ltd. For services to Export.
- Robert Hanson. For services to the Transport Industry and to Show-jumping.
- Frank Hartley, Dean of the School of Pharmacy, University of London.
- Edgar Thomas Harvey, Assistant Secretary, Department of Employment and Productivity.
- Lieutenant-Colonel Gerald Graham Haythornthwaite, TD. For services to the Peak Park Planning Board.
- Frederick Haywood, Commissioner, Public Works Loan Board.
- Mary Gwendolen Nicol Henry, Registrar, General Nursing Council for England and Wales.
- Thomas Chalmers Hetherington, TD, Legal Secretary, Law Officers' Department.
- Thomas Gordon Hewitson, lately deputy Director of Naval Electrical Engineering, Ministry of Defence.
- Aylwin Drakeford Hitchin, DDSc, Boyd Professor of Dental Surgery, University of Dundee, and Dean, Dundee Dental Hospital.
- Albert Cyril Hopkinson, Chief Architect and Director of Works, Home Office.
- Ernest Eric Hopwell, Chairman, Marwin Holdings Ltd. For services to Export.
- John Herbert Humphrey, MD, Deputy Director, National Institute for Medical Research.
- Alexander Keith, Principal, Stranmillis College, Belfast.
- Aleck Stanley Knight, Collector, London Port, Board of Customs and Excise.
- Francis Nelson Lloyd, Chairman, F. H. Lloyd & Co. Ltd. For services to Export.
- Alderman Charles Henry Lucas. For services to the community in Bolton, Lancashire.
- Kenneth Lionel MacInnes, JP, DL, lately Chairman, Central Council of Probation and After-Care Committees.
- Harry Ladyman Malvern, Managing Director, Remploy Ltd.
- Joseph Thomas Manuel, QPM, HM Inspector of Constabulary.
- Paul May, Deputy Chairman, John Lewis Partnership Ltd.
- Charles Leighton Mellowes, lately Director of Education for Northumberland.
- Alexander Ronald Miller, Chairman and Managing Director, Motherwell Bridge (Holdings) Ltd. For services to Export.
- Leonard William Francis Millis, OBE, JP, Director, British Water Works Association.
- Kenneth Gilbert More, Actor.
- Albert Frederick Neal, Adviser on Bus Management and Operation to Ministry of Transport.
- William Roy Niblett, Professor of Higher Education, University of London.
- John Cyprian Nightingale, BEM, QPM, Chief Constable, Essex and Southend-on-Sea Joint Constabulary.
- Brigadier Hugh Ronald Norman, DSO, JP, DL, lately Chairman, Territorial Auxiliary and Volunteer Reserve Association for the South East.
- Lionel Etridge Norton, Joint Managing Director, Key Glassworks Ltd. For services to the Glass Industry.
- Dora Phylis Oxenham, JP, Alderman, Northamptonshire County Council.
- William John Henry Palfrey, OBE, QPM, Chief Constable, Lancashire Constabulary.
- Jack Edward Pateman, Deputy Chairman and Joint Managing Director, Elliott Flight Automation Ltd. For services to Export.
- Francis Wingate William Pemberton. For services to agriculture.
- Roy Anthony James Pethen, Headmaster, St. Mary's Church of England Junior School, Bridport.
- Joan Ann Plowright (Lady Olivier), Actress.
- Francis Alan Pullinger, Chairman, G. N. Haden & Sons Ltd.
- Kenneth Benjamin Purnell. For services to the community in Birmingham.
- Philip Robinson, Member of former Board of Trade Advisory Committee.
- Ronald Edward Robinson, DFC, Smuts Reader in Commonwealth History, University of Cambridge. For services to overseas studies.
- Leonard Rotherham, lately Member for Research, Central Electricity Generating Board.
- Jack Lucas Roughton, JP, Chairman, Association of Drainage Authorities.
- Frank Rushbrook, Firemaster, South-Eastern Area Fire Brigade (Scotland).
- Maggie Smith (Margaret Natalie Stephens), Actress.
- Harry Alexander Snow, lately Director of Works (Scotland), Ministry of Public Building and Works.
- John Philip Strudwick, Assistant Secretary, Board of Inland Revenue.
- William Geoffrey Thorpe, Deputy Chairman, British Railways Board.
- Ernest Brian Trubshaw, OBE, MVO, General Manager, Flight Operations and Chief Test Pilot, British Aircraft Corporation Ltd.
- Donald John Urquhart, Director, National Lending Library for Science and Technology, Department of Education and Science.
- Josephine Veasey, Singer.
- Raymond St. John Walker, Director for Establishments and Finance, Science Research Council.
- Robert Wallace, County Clerk and Treasurer, Inverness County Council.
- Clifford Roper Warman, lately City Engineer and Surveyor and Town Planning Officer, City of Sheffield.
- Alfred Henry Warren, MBE, Private Secretary to the Parliamentary Secretary, HM Treasury.
- Jack Alfred Wellings, Chairman and Managing Director, G. N. Haden & Sons. For services to Export.
- Hilary a Beckett Eccles-Williams, Managing Director, Rabone Petersen & Co. Ltd. For services to Export.
- John Leslie Williams, Secretary-General, Civil Service National Whitley Council (Staff Side).
- Alderman John Stanley Woodrow, OBE, Southern Regional Member, National Savings Committee.
- Rowland Sydney Wright, lately Chairman, Reorganisation Commission for Eggs.
- George Zarnecki, Professor of History of Art, University of London.

Diplomatic Service and Overseas List

- Frank Hotchkiss Cawson, OBE, lately British Council Representative, Nigeria.
- George Donald Cunynghame-Robertson. For services to British interests in France.
- David Revel Dick, OBE. For services to British interests in Chile.
- James Warrington Foster, OBE, lately Chairman, Public Service Commission, Bahama Islands.
- Edmund Graham Gibbons. For services to the community in Bermuda.
- Edward Ralph Harley, lately Senior Puisne Judge, High Court of Borneo.
- Ian Soot Hutcheson, lately Director of Agriculture, Zambia.
- Lawrence Kadoorie, JP. For services to industry and to the community in Hong Kong.
- John Emile Marks. For services to British interests in Canada.
- Herbert Brian Bamford Oliver. For services to British interests in Ethiopia.
- Denys Tudor Emil Roberts, OBE, QC, Attorney General of Hong Kong.
- James Joseph Alexander Nesbit Ross. For services to British interests in Canada.
- John Hilary Smith, OBE, Permanent Secretary, Ministry of Finance, Benue Plateau State, Northern Nigeria.
- Donald Eric Teale. For services to British interests in Malaysia.
- Hugh Haldane Thomson, MBE, lately Director of Civil Service Training, Zambia.
- Derek Aimone Antona Traversi, OBE, British Council Representative, Italy.
- John Arthur Wilde. For services in the field of industry and commerce in Singapore.

State of New South Wales

- James Frederick John Auswild. For services to the community.
- James Benison Griffin, DSC, VRD. For services to the community.

State of Victoria

- Charles Douglas Donald, ED, MB, BS. For services to medicine.
- Victor George Swanson, ED, Chairman, Melbourne Harbour Trust.

State of Queensland

- Brian Herbert Hughes, of Koumala. For services to the grazing industry and to the community.

State of South Australia

- The Honourable Cyril Douglas Hutchens, MP. For services to politics.

State of Western Australia

- Elsie Curtin, JP. For services to the community.

State of Tasmania

- Eustace John Cameron, of Ross. For services to education and to agriculture.

==== Officer of the Order of the British Empire (OBE) ====
Military Division

Royal Navy

- Commander Roy Henry Charles Bigden.
- Surgeon Commander Michael James Boyle, MB, BCh.
- Commander Peter Charles Brooker.
- Commander Cyril Kenneth Knill Brown, formerly serving with the British Joint Services Team, Ghana.
- Commander Clifford Cowling.
- Commander Francis Leonard Eddy.
- Commander Eric Victor Hugh Manuel.
- Commander Denis Woolnough Mills, DSC.
- Commander Aubrey John Russell Pegler.
- The Reverend John Richardson, VRD, Royal Naval Reserve.
- Lieutenant Colonel Thomas Sherman, VRD, Royal Marines Reserve.
- Commander Alfred Russell Willmett, (Retired).
- Commander David Philip Windibank.

Army

- Lieutenant-Colonel Ernest Arthur Black, TD, (373788), Special Air Service Regiment, Territorial and Army Volunteer Reserve.
- Lieutenant-Colonel Colin Oakley Bound (315000), Royal Corps of Signals.
- Lieutenant-Colonel Richard William Dawnay (411924), The Parachute Regiment.
- Lieutenant-Colonel The Right Honourable Nicholas, Viscount Eden, TD, (410464), The Royal Green Jackets, Territorial and Army Volunteer Reserve.
- Lieutenant-Colonel George James Eltringham, TD, (138267), Corps of Royal Engineers, Territorial and Army Volunteer Reserve, now R.A.R.O.
- Colonel (local) Robert Seymour Genn, MC, (334953), Corps of Royal Engineers.
- Lieutenant-Colonel Charles Joseph Montgomery Hamilton, MBE, (95105), Royal Regiment of Artillery.
- Lieutenant-Colonel (acting) Eric Catterson Hammond, TD, (66948), Combined Cadet Force.
- Lieutenant-Colonel Maurice George Harvey, MC, (360192), The Gloucestershire Regiment.
- Lieutenant-Colonel William Michael Ellis Hicks (393169), Coldstream Guards.
- Lieutenant-Colonel John Frederick Kenyon, MC, (222758), Royal Regiment of Artillery.
- Lieutenant-Colonel Neville Mervyn Ronald Lewis (165492), Royal Regiment of Artillery.
- Lieutenant-Colonel Ernest Lord (174078), Royal Army Ordnance Corps, now R.A.R.O.
- Lieutenant-Colonel John Gerard Moran (444844), Royal Army Medical Corps, serving with The Royal Brunei Malay Regiment.
- Lieutenant-Colonel Thomas Lovett Morony (376437), Royal Regiment of Artillery.
- Lieutenant-Colonel Daniel Godwin Raschen (357053), Corps of Royal Engineers.
- Lieutenant-Colonel Desmond Hind Garrett Rice (334890), 1st The Queen's Dragoon Guards.
- Lieutenant-Colonel Jeremy Charles Angelo Swynnerton (369992), The Staffordshire Regiment (The Prince of Wales's).
- Lieutenant-Colonel Richard Ellis Thomas, MBE, (187959), Royal Corps of Transport.
- Lieutenant-Colonel Henry Michael Tillotson, MBE, (393310), The Prince of Wales's Own Regiment of Yorkshire.
- Lieutenant-Colonel William Arthur Edmundson Todd (293569), The Prince of Wales's Own Regiment of Yorkshire.
- Lieutenant-Colonel William George Wood, MC, (162095), The Devonshire and Dorset Regiment.
- Lieutenant-Colonel Edward Robin McMurdo Wright, MBE, MC, (338194), 13th/18th Royal Hussars (Queen Mary's Own).

Royal Air Force

- Wing Commander Richard Henry Arscott (166093).
- Wing Commander William Leonard Bagg, DFC, (129522).
- Wing Commander Robert William Bass, DFC, AFM, (46023).
- Wing Commander Harold Edward Clements (579797), for services with the British Joint Services Training Team, Zambia.
- Wing Commander Basil D'Oliveira (2238415).
- Wing Commander Peter John George (31220).
- Wing Commander Samuel Hatton (165961).
- Wing Commander Gerald Kenneth Alfred Hollett (157227).
- Wing Commander John Douglas Howard (550944).
- Wing Commander Frederick Charles Hurrell, MB, BS, (503066).
- Wing Commander Peter Hartley Tom Lewis, MBE, (202952).
- Wing Commander Robert John Linford (193370).
- Wing Commander Donald McClelland, DFC, (139420), Royal Auxiliary Air Force Reserve of Officers.
- Wing Commander Arthur Richard Munday (167176), Royal Air Force (for services with the Royal Malaysian Air Force).
- Wing Commander James Oakley (157531).
- Wing Commander Robert Clive Simpson (177277).

Civil Division

- Captain Brian Hilary Agnew, Master, MV Amalric, Shaw Saville & Albion Co. Ltd.
- Horace John Aldhous, Housing Manager, Sheffield County Borough Council.
- Leslie Walter Andrew. For services to the gas industry.
- John Arbuckle. For services to Scottish agriculture.
- Leslie Thomas John Arlott, Journalist and Broadcaster.
- Ernest Asquith, lately Manager, Contracts and Purchasing, Esso Petroleum Co. Ltd.
- Charles Percy Attwood, QPM, Deputy Assistant Commissioner (Inspectorate), Metropolitan Police.
- Alexander Bannerman, Principal Probation and After-Care Officer, West Riding of Yorkshire.
- Barbara Jean Barnes, Chief Nursing Officer, King's College Hospital Group.
- Charles Douglas Barwell. For services to the Lower Avon Navigation Trust.
- John Joseph Beisty, Governor, Wandsworth Prison.
- James Alan Birtwistle, Chairman, Hampshire and Isle of Wight Wing Committee, Air Training Corps.
- John Colin Boursnell, Senior Principal Scientific Officer, Agricultural Research Council Unit of Reproductive Physiology and Biochemistry, Cambridge.
- Frederick Bradley, Principal, Board of Trade.
- Donald William George Bragg, Chief Executive Officer, Board of Inland Revenue.
- Percival Eric Bray, MC, Director, Twinlock International Ltd. For services to Export.
- Eric Mason Breeze, Chairman, William Boulton (Holdings) Ltd. For services to Export.
- James Brookes, Director of Printing and Binding Works, HM Stationery Office.
- William Hector Bundy, Stage Director, Royal Opera House, Covent Garden.
- Ronald Hosendoff Burns, Head of Industrial Chemistry Branch, Harwell, United Kingdom Atomic Energy Authority.
- Fred Eric Butcher, Group Standards Manager, Joseph Lucas Ltd.
- Colin Gasking Butler, Senior Principal Scientific Officer, Rothamsted Experimental Station, Harpenden, Hertfordshire.
- Arthur Ronald Butt, Managing Director, Morris Transport Co. Ltd.
- John Ernest Chapman, Director, Cocoa, Chocolate and Confectionery Alliance.
- John Hugh Chesters, Deputy Director of Research, Midland Group, British Steel Corporation.
- Albert Edwin Clark, JP, Alderman, City of Salford.
- Joseph Clark, Chief Engineer, MV Plainsman, Thomas & James Harrison Ltd.
- Florence Kate Clemetson, Editor-in-Chief, Kent and Sussex Courier Group of Newspapers.
- Mary Kathleen Corr (The Reverend Mother Laurentia), Vice-Principal, St. Dominic's High School, Belfast.
- James Craig, Assistant Registrar of Friendly Societies for Scotland.
- Colonel Noel Andrew Cotton Croft, DSO, Commandant, Metropolitan Police Cadet Corps.
- Phillip Edward Cuckow, Approved Auditor to Registry of Friendly Societies.
- Aneirin Talfan Davies, Head of Programmes, Wales, British Broadcasting Corporation.
- Sydney Raymond Dawson. For services to Save the Children Fund in Korea.
- Cyril James Henry Deacon, Chief Accountant, Ministry of Technology.
- Alfred George Deller, Singer.
- Edward Kent Willing-Denton, JP, lately Director, Mond Division, Imperial Chemical Industries Ltd. For services to Export.
- Henry James Dolman, Chairman and Managing Director, Brecknell, Dolman & Rogers Ltd., Bristol. For services to Export.
- Hay Downie, JP, lately General Treasurer, Church of Scotland.
- Henry Arthur Yevilly Dyer, Deputy Director of Accounts, British Airports Authority.
- Arthur Eaton, Secretary, Cumberland Development Council.
- Ernest Eric Edwards, Assistant Clerk of the Crown Court at Manchester.
- Joseph Ellis, MBE, JP. For services to the deaf and dumb.
- Richard Tunstall Ellis, Chairman, Scottish Area, Trustee Savings Banks Association.
- William Armon Ellis. For local government and social services in Flintshire.
- Thomas Idris Evans, MVO, Director of Information, Welsh Office.
- Margaret Irene Farrer, Matron, Forest Gate Maternity Hospital.
- Robert Ferguson. For services to civil engineering in Northern Ireland.
- Evan Fletcher, MD, FRCP, Consultant Physician (Cardiology), City Hospital, Belfast.
- Alexander Thomas Forbes, Cost Accountant, Department of Education and Science.
- James Adam Sholto Forman, MB, BChir, FRCGP, Member of a Group General Practice and Health Centre, Barnstaple.
- George Miklos Gaits, Senior Architect, Ministry of Housing and Local Government.
- Wilfred Ronald Gellatly, AFC, Chief Test Pilot, Westland Helicopters Ltd., Yeovil.
- John Albert Gentle, JP. For services to the Magistracy in Worthing.
- Henrietta Lilian Mary Gibbs, Chairman, Birmingham and Tamworth Area Local National Insurance Tribunal.
- Dennis Percy Gillard, Sales Director, Boosey & Hawkes Ltd. For services to Export.
- Reginald Goode, Member of the Council and past President, British Optical Association.
- Joseph Gormley, JP, North West Area Secretary, National Union of Mineworkers.
- Hugh Greenwood, Founder and Chairman, The Children's Research Fund.
- Kenneth James Griffin, Area Secretary, Electrical Trades Union.
- John Bennett Grosset. For services to pharmacy in Edinburgh.
- Isabel Alice Gullick, Welfare Officer, Young Men's Christian Association, British Army of the Rhine.
- Wilfred Hadfield, lately Divisional Engineer, Greater London Council.
- James Roy Lindsay Halley, DL, Chairman, Dundee Approved Schools Society.
- John Edgar Hartill, JP, Managing Director, Minton Ltd. For services to Export.
- Donald Wescombe Hawkins, Managing Director, Dunlop Plantations Ltd.
- Thomas Andrew Forrest Henshilwood, Assistant Director of Social Work, Glasgow.
- Roger Fleetwood Hesketh, TD, DL, Chairman, Lancashire Agricultural Executive Committee.
- Raymond Hillier, HM Superintending Inspector of Factories, Department of Employment and Productivity.
- Henry Frederick Hiscocks, MRCS, LRCP, Chairman, Southend-on-Sea, Executive Council. Vice-Chairman, Southend-on-Sea Hospital Management Committee.
- Frederic Herbert Bedo Hobbs, MBE, JP, South-Eastern Regional Member, National Savings Committee.
- Katharine Harvey Horsfall, JP, Member, Liverpool Regional Hospital Board and Chairman, Mental Health Committee.
- Arthur Reginald Hughes, Chief Executive Officer, Ministry of Agriculture, Fisheries and Food.
- Henry Humble, MBE, Member, National Savings Committee for Scotland.
- Walter Hunt, JP, Alderman, Barnsley County Borough.
- Captain William Sutherland Inkster, Harbourmaster, Lerwick.
- Anthony Jacklin, Golfer.
- Gilbert Jackson, Regional Engineer, Wales and Border Counties Telecommunications Region, Post Office.
- Harold Sidney James, Legal Adviser, British Waterways Board.
- Raymond Jarrett, JP, Treasury Secretary, Priory for Wales, Order of St. John of Jerusalem.
- Robert Stanley Jefferies, General Manager, Grains Department, Spillers Ltd.
- James Jenner, QPM, lately Assistant Chief Constable, Kent County Constabulary.
- Harry Johnson, Chief Officer, Teesside Fire Brigade.
- Daniel Gerald Jones, QFSM, Chief Officer, Carmarthenshire and Cardiganshire Fire Brigade.
- Elizabeth Moira Bennett-Jones, JP, Joint General Secretary, Merseyside Youth Association.
- Evan Benjamin Byron Jones. For services to the London Welsh Community.
- Kathleen Joyce Parry-Jones, Chairman, Chiltern Disablement Advisory Committee.
- Henry George Kay, Chief Executive Officer, HM Procurator General and Treasury Solicitor.
- Herbert Keeling, Borough Treasurer, Worthing.
- Michael Kelly, JP, Town Councillor, Stirling.
- Stanley Travis Kershaw, MBE, JP, Actuary, Hull Savings Bank.
- Edwin Frederick Kingsley, TD, President, Tea Buying Brokers' Association.
- Alfred Raymond Kirk, Centre Superintendent, London Air Traffic Control Centre, Board of Trade.
- Frederick William John Lawrance, Assistant Director of Accounts, Ministry of Defence.
- George Frederick Leadbeter, Deputy Chief Road Engineer, Welsh Office.
- William Frederick Lester, Pollution Control and Fisheries Officer, Trent River Authority.
- Douglas William Alfred Lewis, Director, Clothing Export Council. For services to Export.
- Herbert Alfred Gardner Lewis, Chief Map Research Officer, Ministry of Defence.
- Gabriel Frederic Garnons Lloyd, JP, General Manager, The D'Oyly Carte Opera Company.
- John Laviers Lloyd, Headmaster, Blyth County Grammar School, Northumberland.
- Winifred Lloyd, lately Principal Scientific Officer, Ministry of Technology.
- Helen Olga Lowenthal. For services to Art.
- Kenneth Lynch, Entertainer.
- George Aubrey Lyward, Founder and Director, Finchden Manor (Therapeutic Community), Tenterden, Kent.
- Alexander Cowbourne McKechnie, Consultant to the Latin American Committee, British National Export Council. For services to Export.
- James McKernan, Principal, Ministry of Development for Northern Ireland.
- Charles Hawkins Craig Macmillan, lately Chairman and Managing Director, E. & S. Livingstone Ltd., Edinburgh. For services to Export.
- George Anthony McPartlin, Technical Director, Central Council of Physical Recreation.
- Robert George Main, ChM, FRCS, Senior Consultant Surgeon, Falkirk Royal Infirmary.
- Allan George Manson, Foreign and Commonwealth Office.
- Philip Kitson Marsden, Deliverer of the Vote, House of Commons.
- Alderman Miss Eleanor Mary Stewart Marshall, Chairman, St. Lawrence's Hospital Management Committee, Caterham.
- Leonard Frederick Mathews, Director and General Manager (Midlands), Associated Television Network Ltd.
- Leslie John May, Regional Controller, Land Commission.
- George Metcalfe, MBE, QPM, Deputy Chief Constable, West Yorkshire Constabulary.
- Reginald James Philip Middleton, Engineer I, Directorate of Electronics Production (Radar), Ministry of Technology.
- Colin Theodore Miller, Consultant Chief Education Officer, London Borough of Ealing.
- Joan Mary Nicholson Milne, Under Secretary, Central Services, Royal Institute of British Architects.
- Joyce Graham Moffett, Dean of Women, Jordanhill College of Education.
- Cyril Dion Morgan, Secretary, The Institution of Structural Engineers.
- Alderman William Charles Tregarthen Mumford, JP, Chairman of the Council of the Isles of Scilly.
- Francis Murphy, DFC, Executive Director (Sales), Hawker Siddeley Aviation Ltd. For services to Export.
- John William Murphy, lately Deputy Town Clerk, City of London.
- Peter Murray. For services to Radio and Television.
- Vera Dilys Neate, JP, lately Alderman, Winchester City Council.
- Cecil Henry Netcott, Clerk to the Justices, Long Ashton, Somerset.
- Kenneth Neve, Director, Turner & Newall Ltd. For services to Export.
- Irene Susan Noble, JP, Chairman, Board of Visitors, HM Prison, Hill Hall, Essex.
- Harold Herbert Norris, MBE, Chairman, Guildford and District Disablement Advisory Committee.
- Patrick Robert O'Day, General Secretary, Federation of Civil Engineering Contractors.
- Henry Richardson Orr, Principal, Medway and Maidstone College of Technology.
- John Gordon Paterson, Principal Regional Officer for Health and Welfare, Department of Health and Social Security.
- Lorna Vincent Paulin, County Librarian, Hertfordshire.
- Claude Malcolm Payne, Chairman, Coventry Executive Council.
- Edward James Peacock, Chairman, Havering National Savings Industrial Committee.
- Lieutenant-Colonel Henry Charles Phillips, Senior Rent Officer, Royal Borough of Kensington and Chelsea.
- Francis Edward Pierce, Chief Designer, National Institute of Oceanography.
- Leonard William Piggin, Export Director, Charles Thackray & Sons Ltd. For services to Export.
- Claude Drew Pike, Chairman and Managing Director, Watts, Blake, Bearne & Co. Ltd., Newton Abbot. For services to Export.
- Robert John Francis Homfray Pinsent, MRCS, LRCP, General Medical Practitioner, Handsworth, Birmingham.
- Edward Hanson Platts, MRCS, LRCP, General Medical Practitioner, Cleckheaton, Yorkshire.
- Arthur Edgar Pollard, Home Sales Director, A. A. Jones & Shipman Ltd. For services to Export.
- Kenneth Joceline Powell, Director of Welfare Services, City of Leicester.
- The Right Honourable Hermione, Countess of Ranfurly, Vice-Chairman, The Ranfurly Library Service.
- Charles Philip Read, HM Inspector of Schools, Department of Education and Science.
- John Dowson Reekie, Chairman, Leicestershire Association of Boys' Clubs.
- Donald Revie, Manager, Leeds United Football Club.
- Gerda Louise Riddoch, Divisional Administrator (Northern Scotland), Women's Royal Voluntary Service.
- William Alfred Robbins, Assistant General Manager (Commercial), British European Airways.
- Harold Ormesher Roberts, Town Clerk of Crosby.
- John Leeming Robson, Chairman, Board of Management, Glasgow Northern Hospitals.
- Gladys Alice Roe, JP, Headmistress, North Road County Infants' School, Carnforth, Lancashire.
- Alderman Edwin Roscoe, JP, lately Vice-Chairman, Farnworth Education Divisional Executive.
- Harold Rothwell, Secretary, Daresbury Nuclear Physics Laboratory, Science Research Council.
- Ansell Savage, Chairman, Barnet Group Hospital Management Committee.
- Andrew Bennet Scott, MBE, Secretary, The United Manchester Hospitals.
- James Leslie Seccombe, Executive Vice-Chairman, Slumberland Group Ltd. For services to Export.
- John Shannon, JP. Chairman, York Civic Trust.
- Captain Francis Baden Franck Sheppard, DL, Diocesan Secretary, Lincoln.
- Ernest Slack, Sales Director, Thomas Ryder & Son Ltd., Bolton. For services to Export.
- Charles Smith, National Chairman, General and Municipal Workers' Union.
- Paul Glennie-Smith, Director, British Footwear Manufacturers Federation.
- Edith Joyce Southern, Foreign and Commonwealth Office.
- George Standen, MBE, Engineering Production Manager and Local Director, Barrow-in-Furness, Vickers Shipbuilding Group.
- Harold Starr, HM Senior Inspector of Mechanical Engineering, Ministry of Technology.
- Jessie Muir Stephens. For services to the Royal Air Forces Association.
- Edgar Sydney Taylor, Assistant Overseas Director, Confederation of British Industry. For services to Export.
- William Gladstone Templeman, lately Deputy Director, Jealott's Hill Research Station, Imperial Chemical Industries Ltd.
- William Edward Tetlow, Works Manager, Imperial Chemical Industries Fibres Ltd., Carrickfergus.
- John Derek Thomas, MB, BS, Medical Officer, Redbourn Works, British Steel Corporation, Scunthorpe.
- Noreen Louisa Thomas, Chairman, Welsh Board, Royal College of Nursing.
- Thomas John Oswald Thomas, Academic Registrar, Cwm Tawe Comprehensive School, Pontardawe, Glamorgan.
- Donald Thomson. For services to the Gaelic language.
- John Harold Vernon, Chairman, Small Industries Committee, Council for Small Industries in Rural Areas, Development Commission.
- Geoffrey Parkes Wade, lately Director, Department of Work Study and Staff Training, Engineering Employers' West of England Association.
- George Watt, MB, ChB, General Medical Practitioner, Langholm, Dumfriesshire.
- George Thomas Whittle, Further Education Inspector, Birmingham Local Education Authority.
- John Peter Wilde, Principal Executive Officer, Department for National Savings.
- Frederick Charles Wilford, lately Editor, Lancashire Evening Post.
- Harry Leslie Willett, Deputy Director-General, Production Department, National Coal Board.
- Leonard Thomas Williams, lately Chairman, Trade Union Side, Joint Consultative Industrial Whitley Council.
- Ellis Wood, JP, Alderman, Lancashire County Council.
- Harry Russell Halkerston Woolford, Chief Restorer, National Galleries of Scotland.
- Arthur Rupert Woolley, DSO. For services to the Royal Commonwealth Society for the Blind.

Diplomatic Service and Overseas List

- Ann Tse-kai, JP. For services to industry in Hong Kong.
- Donald Dunmore Ash. For services to the community in Trinidad and Tobago.
- Austin Gabriel Baillon. For services to British interests in Venezuela.
- Lawrence Patrick Biggie, lately Her Majesty's Consul, Havana.
- William Robert Birkett, MB, BCh. For services in the field of ophthalmology in Kenya.
- John Richard Bolton, lately First Secretary-in-Charge, British High Commission Office, Christchurch, New Zealand.
- Bertram Lindsay Bowers, lately Principal, Maseno Secondary School, Kenya.
- Francis Nicholas Boylan. For services to British interests in Southern Italy.
- Donald Ernest Bragg, Director of Audit, Lesotho.
- Donald St. Clair Brookes. For public services in St. Kitts-Nevis-Anguilla.
- Humphrey Morrison Burkill, lately Director of the Botanic Gardens, Singapore.
- Robert Henry Burns. For services to British interests in South Africa.
- Donald Gordon Carmichael. For services to British interests in Northern Italy.
- John William Spencer Corbett, DSO, lately British Trade Commissioner, Winnipeg, Canada.
- Norman Charles Davey, BBC Engineer. For services in Singapore and Libya.
- Eric Reginald Downer, lately Assistant Commissioner of Lands and Surveys, Uganda.
- Sidney Albert William Dunn, Honorary British Vice-Consul, Fernando Pó, Equatorial Guinea.
- Ronald Elphick, First Secretary, British High Commission, Canberra.
- Charles Germain Gaggero. For public services in Gibraltar.
- Edgar Gilbert Napier Gegg, JP. For public services in British Honduras.
- Richard Gibb. For services to British interests in Australia.
- Anthony James Allan Gillan. For services to British oil interests in Iraq.
- Peter Alfred Graham, JP. For services to commerce and industry in Hong Kong.
- Walter Butler Clough Grant, MBE, MC, Honorary British Consul, Córdoba, Argentina.
- Andrew James Gray, MB, ChB, Senior Medical Adviser, Save the Children Fund, Nigeria.
- Herbert Edward John Hale, lately Her Majesty's Consul, São Paulo, Brazil.
- Alan Frederick Ronald Harvey, First Secretary, Her Majesty's Embassy, Tokyo.
- Alethea Catharine Hayter, British Council Representative, Belgium and Luxembourg.
- Cecil Herbert James, MRCS, LRCP, lately Deputy Director, Medical Services, Sabah.
- Greaves Beresford James, JP, President of the Senate, Grenada.
- Vassel Godfrey Johnson, Financial Secretary, Cayman Islands.
- Kwok Lam-po, JP. For services to the community in Hong Kong.
- Garnet James Levarity, Government Administrative Officer, Freeport, Bahama Islands.
- John Michael Liudzius, lately First Secretary, Her Majesty's Embassy, Rangoon.
- Antranig Samuel Manugian, MD, Medical Director, Lebanon Hospital for Mental and Nervous Disorders, Beirut.
- John Richard Masson, MBE, Permanent Secretary, Ministry of Finance, Swaziland.
- Leslie Holliss Moore, lately Congo Field Secretary, Baptist Missionary Society.
- Gerard Denis Murphy, MB, BCh. For services to medicine and public health in Fiji.
- Ernest Jack Neal, Manager, Commonwealth Development Corporation, Sarawak and Sabah.
- John Stuart Noaks, MB, BS, Senior Medical Officer, St. Helena.
- John Charles Northway, Director of Audit, Botswana.
- Hubert Louis O'Bryan-Tear, First Secretary, Her Majesty's Political Residency, Bahrain.
- Douglas McCallum Ramsay, Dean, Faculty of Agriculture, Ahmadu Bello University, Zaria, Northern Nigeria.
- John Gregory Richardson, General Manager, Swaziland Electricity Board.
- Alan James Roberts, General Manager, Botswana Meat Commission.
- Albert Edwin Robinson, BEM, lately Chief Engineer, East African Airways, Kenya.
- George Ian Mackenzie Ross, MB, FRCS, lately Medical Superintendent, Al Maktum Hospital, Dubai, Persian Gulf.
- James Peden Rutherford, lately Administrative Officer, Government of Malaysia in Sabah.
- Bruce Walter Sandilands, Land Development Officer, Lands and Surveys Department, Sabah.
- Albert Edward Saunders, lately First Secretary, Her Majesty's Embassy, Baghdad.
- Edward Thomas Sayer. For services to journalism in Bermuda.
- Cuthbert Montraville Sebastian, MD, CM, Medical Superintendent, Joseph N. France General Hospital, St. Kitts.
- Lieutenant-Colonel Richard Evelyn Sheridan Skelton, Administrator, Save the Children Fund in Jordan.
- Arthur Francis Steel. For services to the British community in Chile.
- Ronald Anthony Sutch. For services to British interests in Turkey.
- William Rowan de Warrenne Waller, lately British Colombo Plan Tea Adviser, South Vietnam.
- John Herbert Walsh, First Secretary, Her Majesty's Embassy, Bucharest.
- Ira Wendell Walwyn, Permanent Secretary, Premier's Office, and Head of Civil Service, St. Kitts-Nevis-Anguilla.
- Richard Ernest Webb, MBE, Director of Reference and Library, British Information Services, New York.
- Charles John Noel Will. For services to the British tea industry in India.
- Henry Harvey Williams. For public services in St. Vincent.
- Richard Brian Woodroofe, Acting Permanent Secretary, Ministry of Agriculture, Kano State, Nigeria.
- William Raymond Wooff, Chief Tsetse Officer, Uganda.

State of New South Wales

- The Honourable Fred William Bowen. For services to the community.
- William Robert Cutler. For services to pharmacy.
- Joan Florence Groth. For services to the community.
- William Henry Lober. For services to the community.
- Gordon Dalyell Richardson, Principal Librarian and Secretary of the Library of New South Wales.
- Alan Ridley. For services to the community.
- Jessie Margaret Scotford. For services to the community.

State of Victoria

- Kathleen Gordon Cameron, of Sorrento. For services to the community.
- Vernon Wicker Officer, of East Malvern. For services to the pastoral industry.
- Eric Herbert Pearce, of Toorak. For services to broadcasting.
- John Allen Russell, of Nurrabiel. For services to the community.
- Lillian Mary Sheridan, of Newtown, Geelong. For services to the community.
- The Honourable Clive Phillip Stoneham, of Maryborough. For services to politics.

State of Queensland

- Mervyn John Reginald Anderson, of Toowoomba. For services to the welfare of sub-normal children.
- Harold Raymond Gardner, of Wandal, Rockhampton. For services to local government and to the community.
- Beryl May Hinckley, MB, ChB, of Indooroopilly. For services to medicine, particularly in the field of mental illness.
- Donald Parkinson, of Cunnamulla. For services to the grazing and pastoral industries.

State of South Australia

- Jack Clover Andrew, of Waikerie. For services to local government and to the community.
- Stanley Hamilton Elliott, of Mount Gambier. For services to local government and to the community.
- Richard William Rollond, of Murray Bridge. For services to local government and to the community.
- Joanne Wilson, of North Adelaide. For services to ballet.

State of Western Australia

- The Right Reverend Monsignor John Thomas McMahon. For services to education.
- Clifford Victor Pederick, JP, of Wagin. For services to land development.
- William Henry Robinson, of York. For services to local government.

State of Tasmania

- John Maurice Dillon, Warden of the Municipality of Bruny.
- Basil Stuart Sproule, of Burnie. For services to the community.

==== Member of the Order of the British Empire (MBE) ====
Military Division

Royal Navy

- Engineer Lieutenant Commander (M.E.) Reginald Alfred Amey, on loan to the Royal Malaysian Navy.
- Instructor Lieutenant Commander Geoffrey Leonard Bond.
- Engineer Lieutenant Commander (O) Donald William Geake.
- Lieutenant Commander (SD) (G) John William Goulder.
- Lieutenant Commander (S.C.C.) William John Herbert, Royal Naval Reserve.
- Lieutenant Commander Francis Rowland Jerram.
- Engineer Lieutenant Commander (L) Frederick James Pavey.
- Lieutenant Commander Dennis Peter Selwood.
- Lieutenant Commander Kenneth Hugh Reginald Thresh, DSC, (Retired).
- Supply Lieutenant Commander (S) John Edward Herbert Uden.
- Engineer Lieutenant (A/E) Denis Rowland Whittaker.
- Captain (Local Major) Terrance John Wills, Royal Marines.

Army

- Captain (Quartermaster) James Bain (204923), Queen's Own Highlanders (Seaforth & Camerons), now retired.
- Captain (acting) Royston George Ball (485307), General List.
- 14469635 Warrant Officer Class I John Baston, Corps of Royal Engineers.
- Major Robert Benson (400765), Royal Army Pay Corps, serving with British Joint Services Training Team.
- 3537444 Warrant Officer Class I Walter Bibby, The Parachute Regiment.
- Major John Alfred Boys, TD, (443158), Corps of Royal Engineers, Territorial and Army Volunteer Reserve.
- Captain (Quartermaster) Harold John Briggs (472711), Royal Regiment of Artillery.
- Major (Quartermaster) Sylvester Andrew Byrne (454528), The Royal Irish Rangers (27th (Inniskilling) 83rd and 87th).
- Major Paul Stephen Cassar Torreggiani (104054), Royal Malta Artillery.
- Major Michael Stratton Clarke (186607), Royal Regiment of Artillery.
- Major Norman Thomas Davies (433094), Royal Regiment of Artillery.
- Major Edwin Derek Etienne Dougherty (424746), Royal Army Educational Corps.
- Major John Geoffrey Dunstone (430296), Royal Regiment of Artillery.
- Captain John Nugent Feathers (476249), Royal Army Ordnance Corps.
- Major (Quartermaster) George Ferguson (453711), The Parachute Regiment.
- Major Timothy Robert Sherlock Gooch (440011), The Life Guards.
- Major Keith Mortimer Goodall (95176), Royal Regiment of Artillery.
- 22258625 Warrant Officer Class II Cyril Arthur Green, Royal Army Medical Corps, Territorial and Army Volunteer Reserve.
- Captain John William Green (180110), Corps of Royal Engineers, Territorial and Army Volunteer Reserve.
- Captain Derek William Hargreaves (420336), The Green Howards (Alexandra, Princess of Wales Own Yorkshire Regiment).
- Major Richard Denis Holland (424357), Corps of Royal Engineers.
- Major John Alan William Holmes (419494), The Worcestershire Regiment, now R.A.R.O.
- Major John Michael Coats Hutton (368217), The Light Infantry.
- Major Ronald John Jenkins (440052), The Parachute Regiment.
- Captain Graham Malcolm Longdon (459291), The Prince of Wales's Own Regiment of Yorkshire.
- Major Stephen Love (411300), Royal Regiment of Artillery.
- Major (acting) Hugh McLarney (351529), Army Cadet Force.
- Captain Thomas Irvine Moore (479112), Corps of Royal Engineers, now retired.
- Major Robert Howard Morgan (324860), Royal Army Ordnance Corps.
- 21023871 Warrant Officer Class I Ronald Newey, Royal Army Ordnance Corps.
- Major Henry Richard Owen (400009), Royal Army Ordnance Corps.
- Major Adrian Gilbert Clement Weston Peck (403723), The Queen's Own Hussars.
- Captain (acting) Reginald Ian Stevens Purbrick (475218), 17th/21st Lancers.
- 22308067 Warrant Officer Class I Francis Joseph Quinn, Royal Army Ordnance Corps.
- Major Norman Roberts (414958), 10th Princess Mary's Own Gurkha Rifles.
- Captain Terence Ridgeway Shimmin (484315), Royal Army Pay Corps.
- 19032536 Warrant Officer Class II Douglas William Frederick Sidwell, Royal Army Ordnance Corps.
- Captain (Quartermaster) Ronald Smith (456405), The Argyll and Sutherland Highlanders (Princess Louise's).
- Captain (Quartermaster) James Russell Southby (476332), Royal Army Medical Corps.
- Major Henry Crichton Rawlins Starkey (408048), Royal Regiment of Artillery.
- Major (honorary) Hubert Charles Starr (461713), Royal Tank Regiment, now R.A.R.O.
- 21006010 Warrant Officer Class I Dilys Arthur Thomas, Grenadier Guards.
- 1095164 Warrant Officer Class I Stanley Kenneth Tullett, Royal Regiment of Artillery.
- Major (acting) Patrick James Stigant Whitmore (419856), Combined Cadet Force.
- Major (Quartermaster) Marcel Wild (462948), The Queen's Regiment.
- Major Geoffrey Desmond Kane Woolrych (64556), Royal Corps of Signals.

Royal Air Force

- Squadron Leader Dick Botwright (616885).
- Squadron Leader John Keith Burningham (503453).
- Squadron Leader Frederick William Church (51142).
- Squadron Leader David John Coates (4126407).
- Squadron Leader Malcolm Russell Stewart Cunningham (156277).
- Squadron Leader John Gibbon (3516609).
- The Reverend Michael Frederick Hucker (2566740).
- Squadron Leader Raymond Charles Ryan Johnston (540983).
- Squadron Leader Beverley Richard Kent (607472).
- Squadron Leader (now Wing Commander) Patrick Howard Lewis (607303), for services with the Royal Malaysian Air Force.
- Squadron Leader Denis Arthur Loffhagen (2572779).
- Squadron Leader Reginald Charles Mitchell (545799).
- Squadron Leader Michael John Stuart Norman (2412696).
- Squadron Leader Philip John Parks (568545).
- Squadron Leader Michael John Walgate Pierson (4115151).
- Squadron Leader David Arthur Rolph (4102090).
- Squadron Leader Noel Richard Stevens (120501).
- Acting Squadron Leader D'Arcy William Patrick Brownrigg (203090), Royal Air Force Volunteer Reserve (Training Branch).
- Acting Squadron Leader Ronald Seeley, BEM, (573755).
- Acting Squadron Leader Stanley Ernest White (1606887), Royal Air Force Volunteer Reserve (Training Branch).
- Flight Lieutenant Alan Bourne (1803571).
- Flight Lieutenant John Amos Gates (2734361).
- Flight Lieutenant Austin Wilfred Hallett, DFC, AFC, (175747).
- Flight Lieutenant Robert Christopher Perkins (4127016), for services with the British Joint Services Training Team, Zambia.
- Flight Lieutenant Ronald Arthur Price (4152612).
- Flight Lieutenant Jesse Alexander Riley (4000303).
- Flight Lieutenant Maurice George Weller, BEM, (2455051), (Retired).
- Acting Flight Lieutenant Peter Geoffrey Wilkes (1866961).
- Warrant Officer William Alfred Futcher (G0534158).
- Warrant Officer Dennis Alan King (P0591396).
- Warrant Officer Martin McDonagh (G0539900).
- Warrant Officer John Joseph Miller (S1624721).
- Warrant Officer Edward Roy Warren (G0574655).
- Warrant Officer Harold Thomas Campbell West (U0615327).
- Master Air Electronics Operator Kenneth Wilby Wilkinson (Y1438503).

Civil Division

- Kenneth Ernest Abbott, JP, Training and Welfare Officer, British Waterways Board.
- Alderman Katherine Mabel Adlington, JP. For services to the community in Great Yarmouth.
- Charles Augustus Allen. For services to the Royal Air Forces Association.
- Thomas Elwin Allon, Engineer-in-Charge, Caversham, British Broadcasting Corporation.
- Leonard George Ancell, Assistant Shipyard Manager, Vosper Ltd., Portsmouth. For services to Export.
- Flight Lieutenant John Stuart Archer, Chairman, No. 450 Squadron Committee, Air Training Corps.
- Doris Lilian Arlidge. For services to the elderly in Sidcup.
- Charles Ernest Attwood, Principal, Apprentice Training, Ford Motor Co. Ltd.
- Alan Aungiers, Chief Superintendent, York and North East Yorkshire Police.
- Sheilah Veronica Badgley, TD, Foreign and Commonwealth Office.
- Marcus Alexander Bain, lately Chief Purser, SS S.A. Oranje, British & Commonwealth Shipping Co. Ltd.
- Alfred Henry Baldwin, Group Nursing Officer, Glenside and Barrow Hospital, Bristol.
- Horace James Barnes, lately Management Officer, City of Birmingham Estates Department.
- Sidney Barraclough, Secretary, Joint Alloy and Special Steels Technical Advisory Panel, British Steel Corporation and British Independent Steel Producers Association.
- William George Barrett, Assistant Teacher, Moorland County Primary School, Cardiff.
- Thomas Edwin Bashford, Head of Packaging, Technology and Food Science Division, Research and Development Department, Metal Box Co. Ltd.
- John Bateman, Area Production Engineer, East Midlands Gas Board.
- Major Roy Dingwall Battcock, Chairman, The Guild of Guide Lecturers.
- Cyril Stainton Baxter, Vice-Chairman, York and District Local Savings Committee.
- Leslie William Bayer, Marketing Director, Cross Paperware Ltd., Dunstable. For services to Export.
- Marjorie Bayes, lately Deputy Secretary, Royal College of Midwives.
- James Beecroft, Northern Industrial Correspondent, Daily Mirror.
- Harry Beeston, Chairman, Leicester Local Savings Committee.
- Constance Marjorie Claire Beggett, Secretary to the Chief Constable, Birmingham.
- Henry Peter Bell, TD, Chairman, Newcastle upon Tyne Trustee Savings Bank.
- James Bell, lately Charge Nurse, Brockhall Hospital, Lancashire.
- Lieutenant Harry Redley Berridge, Royal Navy (Retired), lately Associate Editor, Navy News, Ministry of Defence.
- John Robinson Bisset, Town Chamberlain, Burgh of Johnstone, Renfrewshire.
- Edith Mary Blackman, lately Health Visitor, Havant, Hampshire.
- Raymond Victor Bernard Blackman, Editor, Jane's Fighting Ships.
- Harold Blackshaw, Technical Adviser (Dyestuffs), Chemical Industries Association Ltd.
- Catherine Margaret Blackwood. For services to the Disablement Income Group, Scotland.
- Lillian Barbara Board. For services to Athletics.
- Reginald Walter Bonham, lately Head of Mathematics Department, Worcester College for the Blind.
- Florence Olive Bonsor, Higher Clerical Officer. Department for National Savings.
- Philip Allen Bowden, Headmaster, The Downs Secondary Modern School, Compton, Newbury, Berkshire.
- Irene Elizabeth Emilie Celeste Brain, Member, National Housebuilders Registration Council.
- Frederick George Branch, lately Chief Superintendent, Suffolk Constabulary.
- Norman Tweedy Bratt, JP, Chairman, Hartlepools District Disablement Advisory Committee.
- Ethel Lettice Brightmore, Honorary Secretary, City of Stoke-on-Trent National Savings Street Groups Committee.
- Piercy John Brocklehurst. For services to the fishing industry.
- George Brocklesby, Site Administrator and Supervisor, W. A. Church & Sons, Wakefield.
- Frank Charles Brookes, Sales Director, J. & G. Meakin Ltd. For services to Export.
- Selina Brookes, Operating Theatre Superintendent, Sheffield Children's Hospital.
- Charlotte Smith Brown, Member, Dingwall Town Council, Ross-shire.
- Ethel Irene Brown, Head Teacher, Pendower Infants' School, Newcastle upon Tyne.
- George Robert Browne, Secretary, National Sea Training Trust.
- Muriel Mina Tillyard Leem Bruggen, JP. For services to the community in Burnley.
- Horace Edward Buckingham, Officer, Board of Customs and Excise.
- James Gallier Buckley, General Secretary, Manchester and District Federation of Boys' Clubs.
- Sarah Jean Buckley, Honorary Societary, Mothers Union, Llandaff.
- Hilda Marie McQuown Burton, lately Executive Officer, Ministry of Defence.
- John Etherton Cant, Chairman, Angus and Perth Local Advisory Committee.
- Sydney Charles Carter, General Manager, Creswell Colliery, North Nottinghamshire Area, National Coal Board.
- Edward Peter Cartwright, Midlands Correspondent, The Financial Times.
- Frederick George Castell, General Secretary, Prison Officers' Association.
- Cecile Rosemary Cavendish, Foreign and Commonwealth Office.
- Thomas Oliver Chappell. For services to the community in Hull and District.
- Penri Rees Charles, HM Inspector of Taxes (Higher Grade), Board of Inland Revenue.
- Reginald Sidney Chetland, Chairman and Managing Director, Chetland Industries (Birmingham) Ltd. For services to Export.
- Baden Howard Chubb, Group Secretary, Derby No. 1 Hospital Management Committee.
- William Eric Church, Senior Research Assistant, Science Museum.
- Henry Wallace Stuart Clark, DL, District Commandant, Ulster Special Constabulary.
- Albin Edward Carson Clarke, Chief Superintendent, Liverpool and Bootle Constabulary.
- Thomas Clarke, Senior Collector of Taxes, Board of Inland Revenue.
- Vera Clarke, Senior Experimental Officer, Tropical Products Institute, Ministry of Overseas Development.
- Julian Reginald Brinton Clist, Director and Marketing Manager, Brintons Ltd. For services to Export.
- Leonard Edward Clow, Commandant, Metropolitan Special Constabulary.
- William Francis Cole, Deputy Director and Regional Horticultural Officer, Commonwealth War Graves Commission.
- Dennis Harold Collett, Contracts Supervisor, Benfield & Loxley Ltd., Oxford.
- Thomas William Collins, Personnel Officer, Belfast Harbour Commissioners.
- John Kiddie Colquitt, District Estate Surveyor, Ministry of Public Building and Works.
- Herbert Murray Colyer, Sales Director, British Berkefeld Filters Ltd., Tonbridge, Kent. For services to Export.
- The Reverend Arthur Connop. For services to the community in Stockport.
- Kathleen Elsa Cornelius, Honorary Consulting Architect, National Association of Almshouses.
- Archie Lowe Cowden, Senior Executive Officer, Board of Inland Revenue.
- David Frew Craig, MB, ChB, General Medical Practitioner, Airdrie.
- William Crompton, Group Personnel Officer, Staveley Industries Ltd., Manchester.
- Robert Greenwell Currie, Headmaster, Kirkhill Primary School, Broxburn, West Lothian.
- Stanley John Cushway, Higher Executive Officer, Ministry of Technology.
- Ellen Maud Mary Davey, Higher Executive Officer, Department of Health and Social Security.
- Doris Davison, County Organiser, Bedfordshire, Women's Royal Voluntary Service.
- Stanley Dawber. For services to the Save the Children Fund.
- John Lionel Day, Export Sales Manager, Thermos Ltd., Brentwood, Essex. For services to Export.
- Arnold Denham, Managing Director, Spinning Division, English Calico Ltd.
- Cuthbert Douse, Organiser of Youth and Community Service, County of Dunbarton.
- Albert Milne Drew, Clerical Officer, Ministry of Defence.
- Colin George Duncan, Senior Administrative Officer, Surrey County Council.
- Charles William Dunham, General Secretary, British Limbless Ex-Service Men's Association.
- Charles Bennett Durrant, JP, Managing Director, J. H. Durrant & Son Ltd., Chatham.
- Reginald Frank Dymond, Honorary Secretary, Newton Abbot Local Savings Committee.
- Ernest Ede, Higher Executive Officer, Ministry of Transport.
- Thomas William Eden, JP, Chairman, Isle of Thanet, Dover and District War Pensions Committee.
- Deirdre Mary Edwards, County Borough Organiser, Hastings, Women's Royal Voluntary Service.
- James Ivan Elliott, Warden, Maudsley House, Oxford.
- Arthur Ivor Evans, Traffic Manager, Aldershot & District Traction Co. Ltd.
- Tom Pugh Evans, Assistant Head Postmaster, Hereford.
- Edith Anne Fairbrother, Manager, Georgian Theatre, Richmond, Yorkshire.
- Maria Farrow, Psychiatric Social Worker; Tutor, West Riding County Council.
- William Frederick Fegan. For services to agriculture in Northern Ireland.
- Joyce Ferguson, Headmistress, Coltishall County Infants' School, Coltishall, Norwich.
- Marjorie Louise Finbow, lately Senior Executive Officer, Ministry of Housing and Local Government.
- Alfred George Edward Findley, Clerical Officer, Board of Trade.
- Rachel Dorothy FitzGerald, Senior Personal Secretary, Board of Trade.
- Roy Arthur Walter Fletcher, Technical Class Grade I, Ministry of Technology.
- Connie May Ford, MRCVS, Assistant Veterinary Investigation Officer, Ministry of Agriculture, Fisheries and Food.
- Reginald Ford, Chairman, Cleppa Park Experimental Horticultural Station Advisory Committee.
- Kathleen Winifred Elizabeth Fox, Foreign and Commonwealth Office.
- Charles Edmund Franklin, Executive Officer, Science Research Council.
- Squadron Leader Richard Cecil Frogbrooke, Wing Administrative Officer (Air Training Corps), Ministry of Defence.
- Eileen Violet Frost, Case Secretary, Distressed Gentlefolks' Aid Association.
- James Samuel Gale, Chief Occupations Officer, Broadmoor Hospital, Department of Health and Social Security.
- Daniel Gardiner, Manager, Machining Armament Division, Engineering Group, Vickers Ltd.
- George Gibson, General Manager, John Curran Ltd.
- Winifred Ada Glass, Headmistress, Winifred Cullis School, Gloucester.
- Jessie Lilian Glenister, Senior Personal Secretary, Home Office.
- Joan Marion Goddard, lately Welfare Officer, Surrey Branch, British Red Cross Society.
- The Reverend George Harold Good. For relief work to the community.
- Alison Lorraine Grant, BEM, County Training Officer, Dunbartonshire Branch, British Red Cross Society.
- Jack Greenaway, JP, Chairman, Cannock Rural District Council.
- Irene Rose Grice, Higher Executive Officer, Board of Inland Revenue.
- Mary Griffin, Manager of Market Research Department, Smiths Industries Ltd. For services to Export.
- Graham Griffiths, Councillor, Port Talbot Borough Council.
- John Emlyn Griffiths, Founder of the Rhos Choral Society, Choral Union and Male Voice Choir.
- Fred Grocott, Works Engineer, Birmingham, West Midlands Gas Board.
- Jessie Marie Hall, Assistant Teacher, St. Augustine's Roman Catholic Secondary School, Billington, Lancashire.
- Lilian Florence Hanks, Clerical Officer, Ministry of Defence.
- Francis William Harbidge, Divisional Officer, Grade III, Shropshire Fire Brigade.
- Ernest Maynard Harborow, Mental Welfare Officer, Cheshire.
- Paul Jefcoate Cambridge Harbutt, Export Director, Harbutt's Plasticine Ltd., Bath. For services to Export.
- Captain George Harcus, Senior Master, Orkney Islands Shipping Co. Ltd.
- John George Harding, Technical Officer (Grade I), Ministry of Commerce for Northern Ireland.
- Constance Mary Hargreaves, Principal Medical Social Worker, Leeds "A" Hospital Management Committee.
- Catherine Honor Harlow, Grade 3 Officer, Department of Employment and Productivity.
- James Harman. For services to the Scout Association in Horley, Surrey.
- William Raymond Harman, Honorary Secretary, Barnet Borough Savings Committee.
- Amy Iris Harris, President, Keep Fit Association.
- Audrey Blanche Harris, Headmistress, Woodlands Infants' School, Redbridge, Essex.
- James Robin Harris. For services to Angling.
- Charles Bernard Harrison, Chairman and Managing Director, Coe's (Derby) Ltd.
- Samuel Dick Harrison, lately Regional Fatstock Officer, Ministry of Agriculture, Fisheries and Food.
- Francis Peter Hart, Senior Executive Officer, Department of Health and Social Security.
- Frederick Hayter, Clerk, Cheshire National Health Service Executive Council.
- Victor Kenneth Henocq, Production Controller, W. Vinten Ltd., Bury St. Edmunds, Suffolk.
- Captain Herbert Harold Henson, Master, MV Dalewood, William France, Fenwick & Co. Ltd.
- Sydney George Hicks, Senior Experimental Officer, Ministry of Defence.
- John Higham, JP. For services to Local Government in Aspull.
- Kenneth Malcolm Hoadley, Chief Assistant County Surveyor, Cornwall County Council.
- Alfred Ewart Hobson, Chairman, Kidderminster Rural District Council.
- Arthur Charles Hodder, Company Director, Area Manager, Abbott of Southampton Ltd.
- Stanley Hodgson, Higher Executive Officer, Department of Health and Social Security.
- Enid Lucy Holder, Senior Executive Officer, Welsh Office.
- Alfred Charles Holdstock, Accountant, Board of Customs and Excise.
- Margaret Joan Holloway, Matron, St. John Ophthalmic Hospital, Jerusalem.
- Joan Honor, Assistant Administrator, War on Want.
- William John Hood, District Inspector, Royal Ulster Constabulary.
- Fred Horton, JP, Personnel and Administration Officer, Prestwick Airport, British Airports Authority.
- Joseph Arthur Horton, Shorthand Writer, West Midland Traffic Area.
- Priscilla Norah Houstoun, Manager, The Airways Housing Trust Ltd.
- John Howard, Machinery Installation Manager, Cammell Laird & Co. Ltd.
- Squadron Leader Charles Nicholas Hoy, Head of Department of Technical Studies, College of Air Training, Hamble.
- Benjamin Hughes, President, Joint Industrial Council for the Lock, Latch and Key Industry.
- Margaret Mary Hughes, Secretary, Hannah Dairy Research Institute, Ayr.
- Owen Hughes, Senior Executive Officer, Department of Health and Social Security.
- William Stanley Hughes, Superintendent, Penhurst School (for Physically Handicapped), Chipping Norton.
- Richard Clarence Humphries, Principal, Family Welfare Section, County Welfare Department, Hampshire County Council.
- William Herbert Hutchins, Senior Executive Officer, Civil Service Department.
- Ronald Percy Irons, DFM, Director, Hodder Publications Ltd. For services to Export.
- Lucy Elizabeth Jackson, lately Personal Secretary, Ministry of Defence.
- Margery Alice Jackson, Assistant Director of Education, Northumberland.
- Alexander Henry James, Acting Assistant District Postmaster, South Eastern District Office, Post Office.
- The Reverend Prebendary Edmund Pollard James, Chairman, Holsworthy Rural District Council.
- Allan Louis Neville Jay. For services to Fencing.
- Olive Emmeline Jewell, Borough Organiser, London Borough of Harrow, Women's Royal Voluntary Service.
- Albert Johnston, HM Electrical Inspector of Mines and Quarries, Ministry of Technology.
- Peter Sidney Joiner, Treasurer, Joint Central Committee, Police Federation.
- John Ellis Jones, Divisional Surveyor, Merioneth County Council.
- Donald Junor, General Manager, Dundee Savings Bank.
- William Henry Juster, lately Chairman, Barking Local Employment Committee.
- Stanley Kenton, Principal Clerk, General Division, London Fire Brigade.
- Kathleen Daphne Kidner, Secretary, Essex Old People's Welfare Association.
- Horace Frederick King, Head of Technical Services, British Aircraft Corporation (Filton) Ltd., Bristol.
- Eric Charles Kirton, Inspector of Taxes (Higher Grade), Board of Inland Revenue.
- Frank Henry Knight, Member, Tewkesbury County Borough.
- Kathleen Edith Knight, Foreign and Commonwealth Office.
- Andrew Filz Laird. For services to the Nottingham Council of Social Service.
- Hester Mary Land, Voluntary Social Worker, Glasgow.
- John Desmond Victor Lavers, Head of Maintenance Section, Engineering Division, Independent Television Authority.
- Maurice Lee, lately Travel Centre Manager, London, British Railways Board.
- Albert Edward Lewis, Manager, Ordnance Board Printing Press, Ministry of Defence.
- Frank Edward Longhorn, Staff Manager (Organisation), York, British Railways Board.
- Leslie Reginald Lorentz, General Manager, London Trustee Savings Bank.
- The Reverend Father John Joseph Lowry. For social work for the community.
- Mercy Saie Kathleen Martha MacCann, Head of the Art Department, Victoria College, Belfast.
- Margaret Chalmers McColl, Higher Executive Officer, Ministry of Technology.
- William Gerald McDonald, Senior Executive Officer, General Register Office.
- Duncan McGregor, Senior Executive Officer, Department of Health and Social Security.
- Neil John Mackay, Assistant Chief Engineer, Electrical and Mechanical Design Office, Reactor Group, Risley, United Kingdom Atomic Energy Authority.
- Mary Winifred McLaughlin, JP. Member, Lanarkshire County Council.
- Mary Cameron McNeill, Executive Officer, Board of Inland Revenue.
- Mary McPhail McNiven, Controller of Typists, HM Treasury.
- Leonard William Mandy, Senior Press Officer, Northern Region, Central Office of Information.
- Sydney Marsden, Senior Executive Engineer, Post Office Telecommunications Headquarters Research Branch.
- Edith Marsh, Grade 4 Officer, Department of Employment and Productivity.
- Cecil Ernest Marston, Chairman, Nuneaton Local Savings Committee.
- Alberta Mary Martin, Member, National Savings Educational Committee.
- George Alexander Matthew, Clerk to the City of Aberdeen National Health Service Executive Council.
- Ernest Michael Miller, Chief Administration Officer, The Football Association.
- Mary Edwina Millican, Honorary Secretary, Chorley Local Savings Committee.
- Harry Milne, Principal Teacher of Russian, Leith Academy and James Gillespie's High School, Edinburgh.
- James Alexander Park Milne, Senior Instructional Officer, Small Industries Council for Rural Areas of Scotland.
- Ruth Mary Monro, MD, MRCGP, Medical Officer, Castle Huntly Borstal Institution, Angus.
- Shaw Montgomery, District Inspector, Royal Ulster Constabulary.
- Geoffrey Albert John Morley, Honorary Treasurer, Royal Naval Benevolent Trust.
- Lewis William Reeve Morley, Chairman, Vacu-Lug group of companies. For services to Export.
- Isobel Helen Morris, Superintendent, Home Nursing Service, City of Birmingham.
- Lilian Ursula Morrish, Assistant County Superintendent, Surrey, St. John Ambulance Brigade.
- Margery Pritchard Morton, Personal Secretary, Ministry of Defence.
- William Armstrong Motley, Director, W. A. Motley Ltd. For services to Export.
- Harry Myers, Deputy Clerk, Oxford City Justices.
- Ruby Marguerite McCloy Neilson. For social work for the community.
- John Nicol, Deputy Chief Constable, Aberdeen City Police.
- Robert Thompson Nisbet, Member, Schools Advisory Committee of the National Savings Committee for Scotland.
- Agnes Irene Nolan, Grade 4 Officer, Department of Employment and Productivity.
- Edward Norman, Group Transport and Traffic Manager, Newton Chambers & Co. Ltd., Sheffield.
- Arthur North, District Secretary, Mid-Glamorgan District, Transport and General Workers' Union.
- James Ernest Northern, Member, Bedfordshire Agricultural Executive Committee.
- Krstivoje Obradovic, Camp Leader, European Voluntary Workers, Ministry of Defence.
- Desmond Gregory O'Donnell. For relief work to the community.
- Ethel Oliver, Head Teacher, Wingate County Junior Mixed School, County Durham.
- Paul Julius Olsen, Export Sales Manager (Hose Division), Super Oil Seals & Gaskets Ltd. For services to Export.
- John Lee Osbaldeston, Chief Warning Officer, Carlisle Group, United Kingdom Warning and Monitoring Organisation.
- Thomas George Page, Head Occupational Therapist, Downshire Hospital, Downpatrick.
- William Geoffrey Palmer, Clerk to the Wellingborough Urban District Council.
- Violet Susan Parker, Office Training Manager, Industrial Centre, Spastics Society, Lancaster.
- Reginald Wilfred Parslow, Welfare Secretary, Bristol Engine Division, Rolls-Royce Ltd.
- Guy Charles Pascoe, Chief Medical Laboratory Technician, Tottenham Group of Hospitals.
- James Paul. For services to Agriculture and Agricultural Workers.
- Alderman Edward John Pauling, JP, Area Traffic Manager, London Transport Board.
- Joan Katharine Pearson, Headmistress, Warlingham County Infants' School, Surrey.
- Samuel William Pearson, Works Manager, Castleford Factory, United Glass Containers Ltd. For services to Export.
- William Gillies Shields Pearson, Honorary Secretary, South Lanarkshire Industrial Estates Savings League.
- Felicity Peck, Managing Director, Watford Glass Co. Ltd., Watford. For services to Export.
- Irwin Arthur William Peck, MB, BS, Farmer, Cambridgeshire.
- Monica Helen Wilks Peel, Matron, St. Michael's Hospital, Aylsham, Norfolk.
- Eifion Glyn Phillips, Senior Manager, Milk Marketing Board's Creamery, Felinfach, Cardiganshire.
- Keith George Henry Pitkethly, Divisional Officer (Training), London Ambulance Service.
- Henry Plumb, Chief Superintendent, Surrey Constabulary.
- Margaret Blanche Potter, Higher Executive Officer, Department of Health and Social Security.
- Robert Preston, Deputy Secretary, Yorkshire Electricity Board.
- Annie Price. For services to the community in Llanelli.
- Marjorie Ethel Maud Prophet, Senior Executive Officer, Department of Health and Social Security.
- Clarence Arthur Bryan Pulham, Higher Technical Officer, HM Stationery Office.
- Joan Putwain (Mrs. Hudson), Secretary, British Mantle Manufacturers' Association. For services to Export.
- Muriel Evaline Read, Finance Secretary, The Victoria League for Commonwealth Friendship.
- Robert Reid, Chief Engineer, MV Irisbank, Andrew Weir & Co. Ltd.
- Charles James Renshaw, QPM, Commander, Metropolitan Police.
- Matthew Henry Richards, Managing Director, M. H. Richards Ltd., Newquay, Cornwall.
- Michael William Rickey, Executive Secretary, Institute of Navigation.
- Ernest Henry Ridge, Clerical Officer, Department of Health and Social Security.
- Jack Worthington Rigby, Technical and Works Director, Kangol Magnet Ltd. For services to Export.
- John Norman Roberts, Assistant Managing Director and Director of Sales, Preformed Line Products (G.B.) Ltd., Andover. For services to Export.
- Margaret Roberts. For services to the community in Prestwich, Manchester.
- Mary Christian Robinson, Training Officer and Director of Physically Handicapped and Able Bodied Work, National Association of Youth Clubs.
- Charles Graham Roffey, Chief Illustrator, National Savings Committee.
- Ronald Leslie Rogers, Higher Executive Officer, Ministry of Defence.
- Dennis Samuel Rollin, Legal Assistant, Plymouth City Council.
- Kathleen Eleanor Hyde Rutherford, MB, ChB. For services to medical work in underdeveloped countries.
- Barbara Eileen Sanders, Senior Personal Secretary, Office of the Parliamentary Commissioner for Administration.
- Gwendolen Marion Sanders, lately County Nursing Officer (North), Cambridgeshire and Isle of Ely County Council.
- Lilian Sargeant, Medical Librarian, King's College Hospital Medical School.
- Harry Scholes, Chairman, Bolton Local Savings Committee.
- Alexander Scott. For services to the community.
- John Donald Shaw, Experimental Officer, Ministry of Technology.
- Robert Ritchie Shedden, President and Honorary Secretary, Cunningham Division, Ayrshire, Soldiers', Sailors' and Airmen's Families Association.
- Harold George Sherwood, Branch Accountant, Navy, Army and Air Force Institutes.
- Walter Sidney Shore, JP. For services to the Magistracy in Somerset.
- Ella Stewart Brown Simpkins, President, South Devon Branch, English Speaking Union of the Commonwealth.
- William Herbert Slater, lately Assistant Executive Engineer, City Area, Telephone Manager's Office, London Telecommunications Region.
- Harry Lewis Smeardon, Inspector of Taxes (Higher Grade), Board of Inland Revenue.
- Charles Curtis Smith, Head of News and Current Affairs, Grampian Television Ltd.
- Ethel Eileen Smith, Clerical Officer, Prime Minister's Office.
- Jeffrey Vincent Smith. For services to Motor Cycle Racing.
- Robert Chambers Smith, Principal Assistant Secretary, Western Regional Hospital Board (Scotland).
- Charles James Smitten, Senior Executive Officer, Lord Chancellor's Department.
- Emma Elizabeth Snell, Grade 4 Officer, Department of Employment and Productivity.
- Marjorie Spencer, Senior Nursing Sister, Child Medical Care Unit, Enugu, Nigeria.
- Albert Kenneth Steer, Higher Executive Officer, Ministry of Housing and Local Government.
- Janet Helen Ross Stewart, Interim Secretary and Accountant, Church of Scotland, Council of Voluntary Welfare Work.
- John William Swallow, Chairman, Leeds, Harrogate and District War Pensions Committee.
- David Taylor, Town Clerk, Musselburgh, Midlothian.
- Edward Gibson Taylor, Councillor, Longbenton Urban District Council.
- Arthur Charles Vernon Thomas. For services to the Magistracy in Nottingham.
- Eva Thomas, Member, Northampton Executive Council, National Health Service.
- Hannah Ellen Joan Thomas. For services to the community in Newcastle Emlyn.
- Harold Albert John Thomas, Training and Education Officer, British Railways Workshops, Derby.
- Janie Thomas, President, Association of Child Care Officers.
- William Erskine McColl Thomas, Co-ordinator, Prices Section, British Steel Corporation.
- Arthur Thompson, Honorary Secretary, Parents' and Supporters' Association, Newport Sea Cadet Corps Unit, Monmouthshire.
- Donald James Thompson. For services to Athletics.
- George Thompson, Councillor, Spennymoor Urban District Council.
- Doris Maude Thurlow, Chairman, Lexden, Winstree and West Mersea Local Savings Committee.
- Marion Moffat Tinman, Foreign and Commonwealth Office.
- Harry Titchener. For services to youth in Tower Hamlets.
- Denis Arthur Titterrell, Manager, Safe Driving Awards Department, Royal Society for the Prevention of Accidents.
- James Hill Train. For services to Cycling in Scotland.
- Violet Frances Tranchell, Honorary Secretary, Droxford Rural District Local Savings Committee.
- Alderman George Henry Tranter, JP. For social and local government services in Abergavenny.
- Alfred Edgar Truckell, Curator, Dumfries Burgh Museum.
- Ernest Underwood, lately Chief Reporter, Hull Daily Mail.
- Tom Arthur Valentine, General Manager and Clerk, King's Lynn Conservancy Board.
- Glyn David Walsh, Chief Fire Officer, Pembrokeshire Fire Brigade.
- Douglas Vinter Ward, Manufacturing Manager, Ruston Gas Turbines Ltd. For services to Export.
- Wilfrid John Ward, Superintendent, Army Department Constabulary, Ministry of Defence.
- Sidney James Way, Councillor, Southam Rural District Council.
- Rhoda Weir, lately Matron, Royal Cornwall and Associated Hospitals.
- Reginald John West, Main Grade Surveyor, Ministry of Public Building and Works.
- Alec Thomas White, Head of Art and Craft Department, Gateway School, Leicester.
- Stanley George White, Vice President, Princess Louise's Kensington Regimental Association.
- Helen Kathleen Ramsay Whyte, Senior Lecturer in Embroidery and Weaving, Glasgow School of Art.
- Charles Arthur Wiard, Clerk and Superintendent, Billingsgate and Leadenhall Markets.
- Harry Plunkett Wilbraham, Higher Executive Officer, Forestry Commission.
- Doris Selina Wilkes, Sister, Casualty Department, Royal South Hampshire Hospital, Southampton.
- Henry Willard, Co-founder and lately Chairman, British Association for the Hard of Hearing.
- Phillip Willcox, Senior Prison Welfare Officer, HM Prison Ashwell, Oakham.
- Joan Williams, Clerk, Swansea High Street Station, British Railways Board.
- Morris Williams, Honorary Chairman, West Riding Branch, Institute of Export. For services to Export.
- William Edward Williams, Chairman, Holywell Local Savings Committee.
- John Eldridge Wills, JP, Managing Director, Wills & Packham Ltd., Sittingbourne.
- Marion Kate Wilmshurst, Matron, Dunoran Home, Bickley, Kent.
- Florence Wilson. For services to music in Co. Durham.
- William Arthur Wilson, Group Production Manager, Outerwear Division, N. Corah (St. Margaret) Ltd.
- Gerald Francis Withrington, Higher Executive Officer, Church Commissioners for England.
- Leslie William Wood, Secretary, Oxfordshire Rural Community Council.
- Angela Wooldridge, JP, Honorary Secretary, Stourbridge Branch, Royal National Lifeboat Institution.
- Henry Edward Wright, Commandant, City of London Special Constabulary.
- Jeffery Paley Yorke, Managing Director, Govancroft Potteries Ltd. For services to Export.
- Celia May Coleman Young, Head of Tariffs Department, Confederation of British Industry. For services to Export.

Diplomatic Service and Overseas List

- Thomas Leonard Adams, lately Second Secretary, British High Commission, Kampala.
- Michael William Atkinson, Permanent Secretary, External Affairs, British Honduras.
- Michael Joseph Azopardi, Technical Assistant, Lands and Works Department, Gibraltar.
- Adolphus Vincent Beaty, Pro-Consul, British Vice-Consulate, La Linea, Spain.
- Thomas Leslie Bennett, Chief Collector of Revenue, Lesotho.
- Barbara Berthoud, Matron, Brunei Government Hospital.
- Horace Leslie Bound, JP, Assistant Colonial Secretary and Clerk of Councils, Falkland Islands.
- George Thomas Burgess, First Secretary, Her Majesty's Embassy, Helsinki.
- Arthur Alfonso Caines, Chief Auditor, Antigua.
- Eric George Keith Challenger, Permanent Secretary, External Affairs and Defence, Antigua.
- Chau Li-ping. For services to the community in Cheung Chau, Hong Kong.
- Emmanuel Franklyn Cherman, Permanent Secretary, Ministry of Communications, Works and Natural Resources, Grenada.
- John Carver Church, lately Second Secretary, Her Majesty's Embassy, Rio de Janeiro.
- Joseph Denis Clark, lately Grade 10 Officer, Her -Majesty's Embassy, Moscow.
- Monica Agnes Clyne, Chief Nursing Officer. Grenada.
- Ian Graeme Cormack, Senior Assistant Secretary, Ministry of Finance, Malawi.
- Florence Grace Cowley, lately Personal Assistant to Head of British Residual Mission, Salisbury.
- Sydney Cowper, lately British Technical Assistance Engineer in India.
- Major Victor Curle. For services to the Government of Lesotho.
- Alphonso Daga, Senior Executive Officer, Geological Survey Department, British Solomon Islands Protectorate.
- Elfreda Bennett Davies, lately Principal, Queen Elizabeth School, Ilorin, Kwara State, Nigeria.
- Eyre Carlton Davis, Principal Public Health Inspector, British Honduras.
- Norman Douglas Dean, Resident Welfare Officer, Mauritius Sailors' Home Society, Port Louis.
- Andrew Dow, Deputy Accountant-General, Malawi.
- Eveline Martha Cecily Duncan, lately Senior Executive Officer, East African Community, Kenya.
- Marcus Richard Edward Durand, lately Deputy Director, Veterinary Services, Kenya.
- Major Thomas Frederick Ellis, Principal Assistant Agricultural Officer, Uganda.
- Glyn Evans. For services to the community in Grenada.
- Robert John Vincent Everest, lately Senior Field Officer, Forestry Division, Agnculture and Fisheries Department, Hong Kong.
- James Alexander Ferdinand. For public services in St. Vincent.
- Robert McKean Ferguson. For services to British interests in Nigeria.
- Myrtle Marie Ferris, lately Medical Officer, Pitcairn Island.
- Arthur Horace Garbutt, Honorary British Consul, Messina, Italy.
- The Reverend Desmond Eugene Grant, OSB. For educational and social welfare services in Mexico.
- Laura Emily Groom. For social services in Mauritius.
- Charles Henry George Heath, BEM, Grade 10 Officer, Her Majesty's Embassy, Paris.
- Joyce Margaret Heckman, Senior Personal Secretary to the President of Uganda.
- Agnes Humphrey, lately Personal Assistant to the United Kingdom Representative, International Atomic Energy Agency, Vienna.
- Gwendoline Frances Iland, Clerical Officer/Secretary, Her Majesty's Embassy, Paris.
- Robert William Irving, First Secretary and Commercial Manager, British Week Office, Her Majesty's Embassy, Tokyo.
- Godfrey Herbert Joseph James, JP, Labour Commissioner, St. Lucia.
- Fazal Khan, lately Lands Clerk, Lands, Mines and Surveys Department, Fiji.
- Nathaniel Arthur Langdon, lately Assistant Surveyor, City Council, Gibraltar.
- Herman Albert Leseur, Secretary and Treasurer, Corporation of Hamilton, Bermuda.
- William Donald McFadyean, lately Resident Engineer (Sewerage), Singapore.
- Donald Joseph McMillan, Fire Control Team Leader, Weapons Research Establishment, Woomera, South Australia.
- Roy Peter Martin, British Council Regional Representative, Kyoto, Japan.
- Algernon Bhute Melhuish, Assistant Engineer-in-Chief, Uganda.
- Joseph Patrick Murray, Second Secretary, Her Majesty's Embassy, Vienna.
- Kathleen Janet Nowlan, Grade 9 Officer, Her Majesty's Embassy, Bonn.
- Edmond Karney Richardson Osborne, Chief Broadcasting Officer, St. Kitts-Nevis-Anguilla.
- George Reginald Outhwaite, Honorary British Vice-Consul, Alicante, Spain.
- Eric Patterson, Second Secretary, Her Majesty's Embassy, Khartoum.
- Desmond George Perkins, Third Secretary, Office of Her Majesty's Commissioner, Anguilla.
- Katharine Hope Phillips, Personal Assistant to Her Majesty's Consul-General, Düsseldorf.
- Peter Jacobus Posthumus, lately Deputy Director, Veterinary Services, Botswana.
- Wilna Pothin, Nursing Sister in charge of Maternity Unit, Seychelles Hospital.
- Joseph Herbert Terence Richards, Senior Accounts Clerk and Harbourmaster, St. Helena.
- Mary Isabel Ridd, Grade 9 Officer, Her Majesty's Embassy, Bonn.
- Mary Christine Rigby, Personal Assistant to United Kingdom Permanent Representative to the United Nations, New York.
- Elsie May Ritchie. For services to the community in Dominica.
- Derek Murray Robinson, lately Superintendent, Medical Field Unit, Western Nigeria.
- Eileen Mary Ryan, Clerical Officer, Her Majesty's Embassy, Paris.
- Alan Edward Seager. For educational services in Botswana.
- Alice Sharratt, Chief Accountant, British High Commission, Ottawa.
- Haiderali Karmali Sheriff, British Consular Correspondent for Her Majesty's Government, Bukavu, Democratic Republic of the Congo.
- Bernard Simpson. For services to British interests in Malawi.
- Thomas Canterbury Stowe. For public services in Bermuda.
- John Brian Summers, Senior Assistant, Poultry Officer, Malawi.
- Tang Hing-ip, Senior Clerk, Colonial Secretariat, Hong Kong.
- Colin Reginald Thornley, Headmaster, British School, Vienna.
- Kenneth Charles Thornton. For services to the community, particularly to youth, in Hong Kong.
- Mary Visick, Senior Lecturer, Department of English, University of Hong Kong.
- John Edward Walker, lately Technical Liaison Officer, Turkey.
- Marion Williams. For welfare services to the British community in North California.
- Mary Williams. For services to the Blood Transfusion service in Sabah.
- Eddie Yan Kong Wong. For public services in Fiji.

State of New South Wales

- Philip Arthur Arnett, Town Clerk of the Municipality of Holroyd.
- David Alexander Burnard. For services to music.
- Arthur William Castleman. For services to education and to the community.
- Margaret Mary Chauvel. For services to the Girl Guide Movement.
- Alfred Leslie Crisp, of Port Macquarie. For services to the community.
- Ruth Agnes Gumming. For services to the community.
- Eva Thelma Eleanor Dixson. For services to the welfare of women and children.
- Philip Henry Hardy. For services to local government.
- Reginald Keith Hopper. For services to the community, particularly through the Salvation Army.
- Esmay Clare Lennon. For services to the community.
- Frances Ann May Norton. For services to child welfare.
- Clementine Popplewell. For services to the community in the Randwick district.
- Alan Malcolm Scott. For services to the community.
- Isabel Eileen Watts. For cultural services in the City of Orange.

State of Victoria

- Frances Mary Burke, of East Melbourne. For services to art and design.
- Cyril Checchi, MB, BS, of Willaura. For services to medicine and to the community.
- Alison Hilma Barbara Victoria Cranley, of Parkville. For services to education.
- John Roy Dow, JP, of Chiltern. For services to the community.
- Nina Marjorie Hollis Hine, of Kalorama. For services to politics and to the community.
- John Holmberg, of Elmore. For services to the Returned Services League.
- Ernest Frederick Paul Gerlach, of Horsham. For services to local government.
- Beatrice Kate Guyett. For services to education.
- Loronza Reiley McKenzie, of Kew. For services to tourism and to the community.
- Isabel Mary Mitchell, of Kalorama. For services to literature.
- John Matthew Russell, Mayor of Koroit. For services to the community.
- Herman Schildberger, of Malvern. For services to music.
- Ethel Elizabeth Anne Sharpe, of East Melbourne. For social and welfare services.
- Olive Mary Weaver, of Swan Hill. For services to the community.

State of Queensland

- James Hardie Buzacott, of Cairns. For services to the sugar industry.
- Olive Mildred Clement, of Ingham. For services to the community, particularly through the Red Cross Society.
- John Aloysius Jones, of Indooroopilly. For services to primary industry.
- The Reverend Mother Lois, Mother Superior of the Society of the Sacred Advent. For services to education.
- George Thomas McLean, of Mackay. For services to tourism and to the community.
- John Mann, Entomologist and Director, The Alan Fletcher Research Station, Sherwood.
- Harold Munro, of Brisbane. For services to the community.

State of South Australia

- Allan Edward Chadwick, lately Pilot, Bush Church Aid Society, Ceduna. For services to medical aid.
- Leonard Andrew Day, JP, of Bolivar. For services to local government and to the community.
- William Harry Downing, of Coromandel Valley. For services to swimming.
- Ella Bernice James, of Renmark. For services to the community.
- Kathleen Marion Mellor, of Prospect. For services to pre-school education.

State of Western Australia

- Archimede Fontanini. For services to the community in the Manjimup district.
- James Joseph O'Brien. For services to local government in the Mullewa district.
- The Very Reverend Father Seraphim Sanz. For services to native welfare.
- Roy Shilkin, JP. For services to the community.
- Harold Williams. For services to local government in the Mukinbudin district.

State of Tasmania

- Clarence Gandy Pryor, of Launceston. For services to the community.
- Ivy Blanch Irene Smith, of New Town. For services to the community.
- Margaret Adelaide Young, of Sandy Bay. For community welfare services.

=== Order of the Companions of Honour (CH) ===
Order of the Companions of Honour

- Sir James Chadwick. For services to Science.
- Sir Alan Patrick Herbert. For services to Literature.

=== Companion of the Imperial Service Order (ISO) ===
- Raymond Ross Bailey, Assistant Director of Armament Supply (Naval), Ministry of Defence.
- William Burrows, Chief Executive Officer, Legal Branch, Ministry of Technology.
- Thomas John Crews, Engineering Inspector, Welsh Office.
- Ernest Fawcitt, Deputy Chief Pharmacist, Department of Health and Social Security.
- Charles Sidney Hard Wick, Superintending Estate Surveyor, Ministry of Public Building and Works.
- Gilbert Nathaniel Harvey, OBE, Senior Principal Scientific Officer, Ministry of Defence.
- William Hawthorn, Procurator-Fiscal, Stirling.
- Phyllis Ena Holloway, Chief Executive Officer, Ministry of Agriculture, Fisheries and Food.
- George William Horn, Senior Chief Executive Officer, Department of Health and Social Security.
- William Henry Smith Howell, Senior Chief Executive Officer, Board of Inland Revenue.
- James Harrison Leat, Assistant Controller of Supplies, Ministry of Public Building and Works.
- Stanley Jack McKenzie, Senior Inspector of Taxes, Board of Inland Revenue.
- Arthur William McMahon, Chief Executive Officer, Ministry of Defence.
- Derek William Meacock, Chief Examiner, Board of Inland Revenue.
- William Edmond Morecroft, BEM, Superintending Mechanical Engineer, Ministry of Defence.
- Albert Rodney Osborn, lately Engineer I, Ministry of Technology.
- Leslie Roweberry Ralfs, Senior Area Mechanical Engineer, Ministry of Transport.
- Walter Howell Stephens, Director of Supply and Transport, Home Office.
- William Albert Stubbles, Collector, Board of Customs and Excise.
- Thomas Hedley Taylor, Chief Executive Officer, Export Credits Guarantee Department, Board of Trade.
- James Wallace, Senior Principal Scientific Officer, Ministry of Technology.
- Norman Roy Weeks, lately Deputy Master, Melbourne Branch, Victoria, Royal Mint.
- James Ebenezer Wilson, MRCVS, Senior Research Officer, Lasswade Laboratory, Ministry of Agriculture, Fisheries and Food.

Diplomatic and Overseas List

- Ralph James Hardy, DCM, lately Registrar of Trade Unions, Hong Kong.
- George Andrew Lemay, ED, JP, Director of Government Supplies, Hong Kong.
- Ronald Victor Talbot-Jones, lately Chief Controller, Telecommunications Services, Post Office Department, Hong Kong.
- Fiatau Penitala Teo, MBE, Administrative Officer Class "B", Gilbert and Ellice Islands Colony.

State of New South Wales

- Stanley Cretney Hodgson, Chairman, Grain Elevators Board of New South Wales.

State of Queensland

- Norman Eggert Kropp, lately Auditor-General.

State of Western Australia

- James Joseph Devereuz, JP, Administrator of Medical, Public Health and Prison Institutions and Services.

=== British Empire Medal (BEM) ===
Military Division

Royal Navy

- Quartermaster Sergeant Stephen Lionel Baker, PLY/X 5365, Royal Marines.
- Chief Electrician (Air) James Alan Bell, L/FX 847872.
- Master-at-Arms William Reginald Bolt, D/MX 802877.
- Chief Radio Electrical Artificer (Air) Geoffrey Ernest Brown, L/FX 669259.
- Boatswain Nazzareno Cauchi, R.F.A. Service.
- Chief Petty Officer (Coxswain) Richard Roy Coombes, P/JX 819575.
- Chief Petty Officer (SCPTI) Percy Cooper, D/JX 149774.
- Chief Engine Room Artificer James Murison Creswell, P/MX 693915.
- Chief Petty Officer Denis Charles Edwin Croad, P/JX 818007.
- Chief Engine Room Artificer William Smith Duncan, D/MX 56292.
- Chief Airman (SE1) Patrick Joseph Fallows, L/FX 560031.
- Chief Radio Electrical Artificer Norman George Foster, P/MX 803755.
- Chief Petty Officer Cook Charles Frederick Fowler, P/MX 122212.
- Chief Petty Officer Medical Assistant Frank Gledhill, P/MX 816615.
- Chief Engine Room Artificer David Henry Grout, P/MX 766855.
- Chief Air Fitter (AE) Terence William Hales, L/FX 669679.
- Chief Shipwright Claude Serge Harden, D/MX 857477.
- Honorary Chief Petty Officer Interpreter Grade I, Ismail Moosa Hassan.
- Chief Engineering Mechanic Dennis William Large, P/KX 883525.
- Chief Engine Room Artificer Cyril Albert Mabbett, P/MX 56298.
- Regimental Sergeant Major John McDermott, RM 8270, Royal Marines.
- Chief Petty Officer Stores Accountant John William Albert McIntosh, P/MX 758872.
- Chief Petty Officer Alfred Henry Rogers, P/JX 145728.
- Chief Engine Room Artificer Leslie Alexander Vighcott Scott, P/MX 766871.
- Chief Wren Regulating Mary See, 77937, Women's Royal Naval Service.
- Chief Petty Officer Writer Victor Norris Smithbone, P/MX 605159.
- Chief Radio Electrician Anthony Paul Swann, P/MX 835064.
- Colour Sergeant Reginald Peter Tilley, CH/X 5406, Royal Marines.
- Chief Petty Officer Frederick James Young, P/JX 143447.

Army

- 22289053 Sergeant James Edmund Robert Arnold, Corps of Royal Electrical and Mechanical Engineers.
- 2549639 Staff Sergeant William Kenneth Law Bell, Royal Corps of Signals.
- 14456617 Sergeant Kenneth Aubrey Blatchford, Corps of Royal Engineers.
- 22207419 Sergeant Reginald Robert Brothwood, Royal Pioneer Corps.
- 23689587 Sergeant James Charles Burden, Royal Army Ordnance Corps.
- 14183086 Staff Sergeant (Local) Alvin Charles Lewis Busby, Royal Regiment of Artillery (now discharged).
- L.S/14439717 Warrant Officer Class II (Local) Thomas Clark, Royal Regiment of Artillery.
- L.S/14465314 Staff Sergeant (acting) James Arnold Day, Royal Regiment of Artillery.
- 21188083 Staff Sergeant (acting) Leslie Joseph Emerson, Corps of Royal Engineers.
- 23866742 Staff Sergeant John Henry Fletcher, Royal Army Medical Corps, Territorial and Army Volunteer Reserve.
- 22539314 Staff Sergeant George Rousset Gordon, The Queen's Regiment.
- 23270193 Staff Sergeant James Gordon, Royal Army Ordnance Corps.
- 23242488 Sergeant Richard Frederick Grant, Royal Corps of Transport.
- 21140812 Staff Sergeant Sunar Gurung, Gurkha Engineers.
- 18134574 Staff Sergeant John Harrison, Royal Malta Artillery.
- 21140297 Staff Sergeant Ichhabahadur Rai, The Gurkha Engineers.
- 22289359 Sergeant Peter Kinsey, Royal Corps of Signals.
- 23850224 Sergeant Ian Edward Lennox, Royal Army Ordnance Corps.
- 23882371 Corporal Peter Michael Lloyd, The Parachute Regiment.
- 2702055 Sergeant Gerald Eugene Mansfield, Scots Guards.
- 22454190 Staff Sergeant Edward McColl, The Parachute Regiment.
- 24053734 Lance Corporal Michael Bruce McIntyre, The Parachute Regiment.
- 23924387 Sergeant (acting) Nicholas O'Brien, Royal Army Pay Corps.
- 23673915 Staff Sergeant John O'Neill, Royal Army Ordnance Corps.
- 22817343 Warrant Officer Class II (acting) Albert Edward Peacock, The King's Own Royal Border Regiment.
- 2671106 Warrant Officer Class II (acting) Leslie John Pipkin, Coldstream Guards.
- 23472045 Sergeant Gordon Robb, Corps of Royal Electrical and Mechanical Engineers.
- 22816734 Sergeant Murray Evans Robinson, Corps of Royal Electrical and Mechanical Engineers.
- 23574268 Sergeant Eric Ross, The Prince of Wales's Own Regiment of Yorkshire.
- 22249679 Staff Sergeant Bernard John Rushworth, Corps of Royal Engineers.
- 22549021 Staff Sergeant Robert Sinton Spencer, Royal Corps of Transport.
- 23234887 Staff Sergeant Robert Weir, Royal Army Pay Corps.
- 23412990 Sergeant (Local) Howard Whittles, Royal Army Ordnance Corps.

Overseas Award

- Sergeant (temporary) Rupeni Tuimavana, Fiji Military Forces.

Royal Air Force

- Acting Warrant Officer Michael John Hillman Heritage (M0592499).
- Acting Warrant Officer James Grieve Steven (T2389139).
- U4003419 Flight Sergeant Peter Bamford.
- C1812239 Flight Sergeant Eric Ronald Downs.
- Q4002759 Flight Sergeant Elmer Pryce George.
- G0576909 Flight Sergeant Allan McLean.
- A4026485 Flight Sergeant Alan Wilson Mortimore.
- D0579269 Flight Sergeant Marcus Edward Phillips.
- H405494S Flight Sergeant Billy Waller.
- T4018818 Acting Flight Sergeant Robert Richard Fossey.
- W3500942 Acting Flight Sergeant Robert Cyril Gell.
- N4003038 Chief Technician Arthur Thomas Bamber.
- Y1367832 Chief Technician Douglas Gibson.
- Q4029440 Chief Technician Derek Hargreaves.
- N0579785 Chief Technician Joseph Douglas Harvey.
- H4001961 Chief Technician George Herriott.
- R4081710 Chief Technician Donald Arthur Alexander Lunan.
- A1143486 Chief Technician Samuel McRoberts.
- G0621873 Chief Technician William Hubert Watson Mercer.
- Q0523295 Chief Technician Arthur George Nutley.
- L1929381 Chief Technician Edward Arthur Rainford.
- N2823457 Chief Technician Freda Marjorie Rimini, Women's Royal Air Force.
- W0536241 Chief Technician Joseph Edward Routledge.
- J0548472 Chief Technician Walter George Robson Scott.
- S0587720 Chief Technician Malcolm Arthur Taylor.
- Q4115543 Sergeant John Wilkins Beale.
- F4108590 Sergeant Christopher Richard Branston, for services with the Royal Malaysian Air Force.
- X2447540 Sergeant Leslie Dixon.
- D5066450 Sergeant Terence Wilfrid Hartley.
- X4032227 Sergeant Robert Brian Lambert.
- E4006889 Sergeant Patrick Joseph Mulcahy.
- N1408522 Sergeant Percival George Organ, RAF Regiment.
- K2584607 Sergeant David Edward Thomas, for services with the British Joint Services Training Team, Zambia.
- E4014624 Corporal Cyril Alexander Broadhurst.
- F4247248 Corporal Roy Eugene Leadbeater.
- B4148478 Corporal Terence Paul Lotts.
- Q4256790 Corporal Michael George Thurlow.

Civil Division
United Kingdom

- Victor John Abbatt, Master Stevedore, Royal Naval Armament Depot, Priddy's Hard.
- Frederick Adams. For services to the community in Powick, Worcester.
- George Adams, Steel Strip Inspector, Park Gate Works, British Steel Corporation.
- Janet Anderson, Intarsia Knitting Machine Operator, Pringle of Scotland Ltd., Hawick. For service to Export.
- Muriel Anderson, Assistant Duty Controller 30/Crew I, Inverness, Royal Observer Corps.
- Jack Alfred Bacon, Storeman, Avon Rubber Co. Ltd., Industrial Products Division, Kingston Mills, Bradford-on-Avon.
- Kenneth Claude Baker, lately Constable, Sussex Constabulary.
- Cyril Francis Baldry, Warden, Hitchin Youth Centre.
- Albert Arthur Barnes, Technical Officer, Silverthorne Telephone Exchange, Chingford.
- Cyril Eric Batchelor, Chargehand Storeman, Luton Depot, Eastern Gas Board.
- John Joseph Bell, Storekeeper, Hull Government Training Centre/Industrial Rehabilitation Unit, Department of Employment and Productivity (died 17 December 1969).
- Percy George Belson, Yeoman Warder, Tower of London.
- James Black, Bible Class Teacher, Polmont Borstal Institution.
- Walter Frederick Bowhey, Chargehand, Metropolitan Police Office.
- Frederick Bradwell, Foreman Cable Jointer, Sunderland District, North Eastern Electricity Board.
- Doreen Brady, Manageress, Junior Ranks Club, Theipval Barracks, Lisburn, Northern Ireland.
- Leonard Abel Brettle, Warehouse Foreman, Thos. B. Wellings & Co. Ltd., Cradley Heath, Warley, Worcestershire.
- Herbert James Brimble, Office Keeper Grade 1, Ministry of Transport.
- Albert Brough, Senior Rodent Operator, Ministry of Agriculture, Fisheries and Food.
- Albert William Brown, Experimental Worker Grade I, Royal Armament Research & Development Establishment, Fort Halstead, Kent.
- Frederick Charles Bruton, Training Officer, Groesfaen Colliery, East Wales Area, National Coal Board.
- Reginald George Burt, Netman, Royal Research Ship Discovery II.
- Alan Muir Campbell, Labourer, Barassie Works, British Railways Board.
- Eric Campbell, Head Constable, Royal Ulster Constabulary.
- John Colin Campbell, Storehouse Assistant, HM Naval Base, Portland.
- Ivy Emily Carter (Mrs. Reeves), Senior Restaurant Manageress, British Broadcasting Corporation.
- Walter Edmund Carter, Principal Doorkeeper, Houses of Parliament, Stormont.
- John Alfred Chappell, Chief Instructional Officer III, Eastchurch Prison.
- Fred Harold Clark, Assistant Divisional Officer, Lincoln Fire Brigade.
- Mildred Coaton, Woman Sergeant, Derby County and Borough Constabulary.
- Sarah Jane Coles, lately Sub-Postmistress, Bibury Sub Office, Cirencester.
- Wilfred Coppock, Vertical Boring Machine Operator, S. H. Heywood & Co. Ltd., Stockport.
- Harold James Coulter, Constable, Royal Ulster Constabulary.
- James Cowan, Constable, Royal Ulster Constabulary.
- Wilfred Cripps, Fire Officer, St. Paul's Cathedral.
- Florence Crook. For services to the 12th City of Liverpool Squadron, Air Training Corps.
- Arthur Crosby. For services to Doncaster Royal Infirmary.
- Ethel Ellen Cudlipp, Welfare Worker, Royal Sailors' Rest, Portsmouth.
- James Morton Cunningham, Station Officer, South Western Area Fire Brigade (Scotland).
- Joan Mary Daft, Head Driver, Government Car Service, Wales, Ministry of Public Building and Works.
- Alfred John Thomas Dalkin, Museum Assistant, Museum of Artillery, Woolwich.
- George Ronald Davidson, Chief Officer I, Risley Remand Centre, Warrington, Lancashire.
- Henry Thomas Davies, Coxswain, Cromer Lifeboat, Royal National Lifeboat Institution.
- Clifford Stanley Doe, Experimental Worker Grade III, Explosives Research & Development Establishment, Waltham Abbey, Essex.
- James John Donovan, Schoolkeeper, George Green's School, Poplar, London, E.14.
- Christy Dryden, Cook Supervisor, Wester Langlee Kitchen, Galashiels.
- Harry Eaves, Craftsman Grade II Fitter, 38 Central Workshops R.E.M.E., Chilwell, Nottinghamshire.
- Sarah Fairbanks, Auxiliary Postwoman, Swynnerton, Stone, Staffordshire.
- George Ferneyhough, Constable, Dorset and Bournemouth Constabulary.
- James Fiddes, Driver, Grangemouth Terminal, Shell-Mex & B.P. Ltd.
- Ronald Gadsden, Technical Assistant, Sales Department, British Aircraft Corporation Ltd. For services to Export.
- John Smith Gage, Constable, Cheshire Constabulary.
- William Gardens, Station Officer, HM Coastguard, Kirkwall.
- George Leslie John Garnham, Sergeant, Metropolitan Police.
- James Gault, Postman, Head Post Office, Glasgow.
- Charles Taylor Gibb, Transport Foreman, Scottish Brewers Ltd.
- Norman Edwin Gillatt, Ambulance Driver, Teesside Ambulance Service.
- William Gillett, Chief Inspector, Birmingham Division, British Railways Board.
- Thomas Glenfield, Ambulance Driver/Attendant, Belfast.
- William Gordon, Demonstration Driver, British Leyland Motor Corporation Ltd., Leyland, Lancashire. For services to Export.
- Edward Frederick Griffith, National Savings Honorary Industrial Group Collector, A.B. Electronic Components, Abercynon.
- William Thomas Guilbert, Chargehand, Wellworthy Ltd., West Harnham Works, Salisbury, Wiltshire.
- Molly Beatrice Gustar, Acting Commandant, Isle of Wight Branch, British Red Cross Society.
- George William Hackney, Ambulance Driver/Attendant, Middleton Station, Lancashire Ambulance Service.
- Frederick Thomas Hall, Head Security Guard, British Embassy, Bucharest.
- Elizabeth Halley, National Savings Honorary Street Group Collector, Glasgow.
- George Harrison, lately Herd Manager, Pig Research Station, Wye College, University of London.
- Charles Reginald Hart, Head Porter, Bedford County Hospital.
- James Harvey, Assistant Divisional Officer, Northern Ireland Fire Authority, Londonderry.
- Walter Aitken Hatrick, Technical Supervisor (Electrical), Clyde Submarine Base, Faslane, Ministry of Defence.
- Ivy Bessie Hawkins, National Savings Honorary Street Group Collector, Thornton Heath, Surrey.
- Neville Hawkins, Underground Ripper, Harworth Colliery, North Nottinghamshire Area, National Coal Board.
- John Leonard Heale, Maintenance Electrician, G.A. Harvey Group of Companies, London S.E.7.
- Ernest Frederick Heap, Acting Engineering Mains Foreman, Chichester District, Southern Electricity Board.
- Thomas James Hesketh, Sergeant, Liverpool and Bootle Constabulary.
- Ernest Charles Hills, Grade B Soil Chemist, National Agricultural Advisory Service, Trawscoed.
- Ernest William Hollingdale, Bus Driver, London Transport Board.
- Arthur Wilfred Holloway, Assistant Commissioner, Carmarthenshire, St. John Ambulance Brigade.
- Harry Leslie Holloway, Superintendent, Woodcross Hostel, Sedgley, Staffordshire.
- Frederick John Hook, lately Auxiliary Coastguard in Charge, Teignmouth, Devon.
- Ursula Mary Howard, County Emergency Welfare Organiser, West Kent, Women's Royal Voluntary Service.
- Thomas Howden, General Foreman, Control Group, Du Pont Company (U.K.) Ltd., Londonderry.
- John Howe, School Staff Instructor, Combined Cadet Force, Radley College.
- Herbert Henry Hutton, Service Supervisor, Melton Mowbray/Oakham, East Midlands Gas Board.
- Leslie Ingram, Haulage and Cleansing Superintendent Borough Engineers Department, Newport, Monmouthshire.
- Ronald Arthur Walter Jeffrey, Chief Inspector, Metropolitan Police.
- Harry Johnson, lately Site Manager, W. Irwin & Co. Ltd., Leeds, Yorkshire.
- Peter Johnson, Inspector, Staffordshire County and Stoke-on-Trent Constabulary.
- Sydney Lowndes Johnson, Mess Steward Grade I, Officers' Mess, Royal Air Force Stafford.
- John Barr Johnston, Section Leader, Northern Ireland Fire Authority, Dungannon, Co. Tyrone.
- Alfred Egbert Jones, Foreman, Tinsley Park Works, British Steel Corporation.
- David Alun Jones, Ganger, Forestry Commission.
- Kenneth Glynne Jones, Auxiliary Coastguard in Charge, Penarth, Glamorgan.
- Thomas William Jordan, Civilian Instructor Grade III (Coxswain), Marine Craft Training School, Royal Air Force Mount Batten, Plymouth.
- Robert John Kemp, School Staff Instructor, Combined Cadet Force, Trent College.
- William Amos Kemp, Works Technical Grade III, Site Control Clerk of Works, Ministry of Public Building and Works.
- Thomas Stanley Kitchen-Kenyon, Works Overseer Grade III, HM Stationery Office.
- May Kershaw, National Savings Honorary Street Group Collector, Bolton, Lancashire.
- Alice Mary Lansdown, Organiser and Leader, Red Cross Old People's Club, Cheltenham, Gloucestershire.
- Harold Lattimer, Chief Inspector, Clyde Crane & Booth Ltd., Carlisle. For services to Export.
- James Layden, Fitter, Agricultural Division, Imperial Chemical Industries Ltd., Heysham, Lancashire.
- John Lilley, Storage Plant Attendant, Central Production Station, Northern Gas Board.
- Roland Long, Foreman, Barrhead Kid Co. Ltd., Barrhead, Glasgow. For services to Export.
- James Baxter Lyall, Skilled Craftsman/Caretaker, Poultry Research Centre, Edinburgh.
- Archibald McEachern, Principal Lightkeeper, Covesea Skerries Lighthouse, Lossiemouth, Morayshire.
- Robert Ernest McFarland, Forester, Ministry of Agriculture for Northern Ireland.
- Rory Mackinnon, Boatswain, MV Otaio, New Zealand Shipping Company Ltd.
- Maureen McLoughlin, Group Officer, Lancashire Fire Brigade.
- John MacWhannell, General Foreman, Holloway Brothers (London) Ltd.
- Annie Malone, Domestic Supervisor, Bellshill Maternity Hospital, Lanarkshire.
- Claude Jack Marjoram, Bus Driver, Eastern Counties Omnibus Co. Ltd.
- Edwin Albert Marshall, Chief Steward, SS Stolt Grange, General Service Contracts.
- Lilian Margaret Massey, Member, Flintshire, Women's Royal Voluntary Service.
- Maud Rose Medwell, Domestic Assistant, South Pembroke Hospital.
- Catherine Melia, Speed Frame Tenter, John Bright & Brothers Ltd., Coldhurst Hall Mill, Oldham, Lancashire.
- John Middleton, Operator, Tandem Cold Reduction Mill, Shotton Works, British Steel Corporation.
- Thomas Joseph Mills, Senior Messenger, Board of Customs and Excise.
- John Henry Mitchell, AM, Inspector, Metropolitan Police.
- Kenneth Moore, Sub-Officer, Northamptonshire Fire Brigade.
- Roland Moore, Coxswain, Barrow Life-boat, Royal National Lifeboat Institution.
- Cyril Isaac Munt, lately Road Foreman, Southern Area, Oxfordshire County Council.
- Herbert Edward Murkin, lately Senior Messenger, United Kingdom Atomic Energy Authority, London.
- Walter Edmond Officer, Constable, Royal Ulster Constabulary.
- James Edward O'Neill, Stores Supervisory Grade V, King's Division Depot, Royal Irish Rangers.
- Charles Frederick Owen, Chief Rigger, Midland Area, Independent Television Authority.
- Rose Mary Painter, Centre Organiser, Teignmouth Urban District, Women's Royal Voluntary Service.
- Hugh Owen Parry, Quartermaster, Holyhead, Shipping & International Services Division, British Railways Board.
- Bessie Burns Paterson, lately Telephone Exchange Attendant, Berneray, Lochmaddy, North Uist.
- Sarah Pattison, Home Help, Brindon, Sunderland.
- John Henry Paxton, Leading Hand, Motor Car Assembly Workshop, Birmingham Remploy Factory.
- Alfred Peevers, lately Head Waiter, Members' Dining Room, House of Commons.
- James Edward Phillips, National Savings Honorary Street and Social Groups Collector, Hackney, London.
- William Pink, Station Officer, HM Coastguard, Port Isaac, Cornwall.
- William James Porter, Assistant Inspector, Head Post Office, Belfast.
- Jack Priestley, Inshore Fisherman, Grimsby.
- George Ernest Rashley, Motor Transport Driver, Royal Aircraft Establishment, Farnborough.
- Joseph Anthony Rawson, Sergeant, Royal Ulster Constabulary.
- Irene Raybould, National Savings Honorary Industrial Group Collector, Fort Dunlop, Birmingham.
- William Parry Beaumont Rees, Mechanical Inspector, Ebbw Vale Works, British Steel Corporation.
- Elizabeth Jane Roberts, National Savings Honorary Street and Social Groups Collector, Barmouth, Merioneth.
- William Roberts, Chargehand Fitter, Bradford Road Works, Manchester, North Western Gas Board.
- James Robertson, General Foreman, North of Scotland Hydro-Electric Board.
- Allen Frank Robinson, Civilian Instructor, Headquarters, No. 633 Gliding School, Cosford, Air Training Corps.
- William Rowland Robson, Outdoor Assistant (Works), London Midland Region, British Railways.
- Frederick Valentine Rogers, Underground Stoneman, Horden Colliery, South Durham Area, National Coal Board.
- Donald Ronan, Reporting Member, Coastguard Auxiliary Service, Southend.
- George Rogers-Ross, Senior Messenger, British Council.
- Louis Rota, Messenger, Royal Naval Hospital Bighi, Malta.
- Bessie Russell, Domestic Supervisor, Middlesex Hospital.
- Charles Sackstein, Cablemaker, Switching I Division, Plessey Telecommunications Group, Liverpool.
- David Phillips Scott, Unit Supervisor, Associated Semi-conductor Manufacturers Ltd., Mullard Southampton Works, Southampton.
- Margaret Davidson Scott, Supervisor Telephonist, H.Q. 18 Group, Pitreavie, Scotland, Ministry of Defence.
- Leonard George Shakes, Foreman (Electrician), Kingston District, South Eastern Electricity Board.
- Joseph Shaw, Carpenter, MV Manchester City, Manchester Liners Ltd.
- Leonard Shaw, General Foreman, Tinsley Wire Industries Ltd., Sheffield. For services to Export.
- Francis Edwin Shepheard, Boatswain, SS Hyala, Shell Tankers (U.K.) Ltd.
- William Shone, Telephone Switchboard Operator, Bolton Employment Exchange, Department of Employment and Productivity.
- Kenneth Simpson, Senior Foreman, Atlas Steel Foundry & Engineering Co. Ltd., Armadale, West Lothian.
- Joseph Skinner, Driver/Caretaker, Carlisle and District State Management Scheme, Home Office.
- Stanley Skinner, Station Officer, Kent County Council Ambulance Service.
- Ellen Smith, Canteen Worker, Crosby and Litherland Sea Cadet Corps Unit.
- Eloise Marion Warwick Smith, Centre Organiser, Burnham-on-Crouch, Women's Royal Voluntary Service.
- John Almond Smith, Driver 1, Barton Depot, Shell-Mex & B.P. Ltd.
- Renee Frances Mary Smith, Matron Housekeeper, Civil Service College, Sunningdale.
- June Smyth, Woman Constable, Royal Ulster Constabulary.
- Edward George Spooner, Station Officer, Norfolk Fire Brigade.
- Edward Stagey, Storeman I, Royal Aircraft Establishment, Farnborough.
- Kathleen Stapleton, District Organiser, Wimbledon, Borough of Merton, Women's Royal Voluntary Service.
- James Learmonth Stevens, Chief Divisional Inspector, Edinburgh, British Railways Board.
- Alexander Dixon Stewart, Horticultural Superintendent, Italy Area, Commonwealth War Graves Commission.
- Neil Stewart (Jnr.), Coxswain, Wick Lifeboat, Royal National Lifeboat Association.
- George Stratford, Foreman Driver, Empress Coaches, Bristol.
- Alexander John Tailby, Technical Class Grade III, National Physical Laboratory, Teddington.
- Mary Elinor Taylor, Ambulance Driver, West Riding County Ambulance Service.
- George Alfred Thompson, Clerk Grade 1, Command Secretary's Office, British Forces, Near East.
- William Turbitt, Foreman Driver, Cooperative Wholesale Society Ltd., Newcastle upon Tyne.
- Ida Alice Turner, Tapestry Restorer, Hampton Court Palace.
- Ernest Robert Vaughan, Telecommunications Technical Officer, Grade II, Metropolitan Police Office.
- Norman Henry Vezey, Gatekeeper, HM Embassy, Paris.
- James Robert George Ward, MM, Receptionist (Civilian), Kent County Constabulary.
- William Welton, Sub-Officer, Cumberland Fire Brigade.
- John Frederick Wiggins, Yard Inspector, Newport Docks, British Transport Docks Board.
- Richard James Williams, Mechanic-in-Charge, Post Office Workshop, Caernarvon.
- Arthur Herbert Woodrow, Research & Development Craftsman—Special (Chargehand), Fighting Vehicles Research & Development Establishment, Kirkcudbright, Ministry of Defence.
- Ida Worley, Deputy County Organiser, Isle of Wight, Women's Royal Voluntary Service.
- Stella Wright, National Savings Honorary Street Group Collector, Carlisle.
- Thomas William Wrightson, Storekeeper, Felling Government Training Centre/Industrial Rehabilitation Unit, Department of Employment and Productivity.
- William Lawrence Yates, Foreman, Engineering Department, North District, Liverpool, Merseyside and North Wales Electricity Board.

Overseas Territories

- Edmund Barnes, Foreman, Agricultural Department, Saint Christopher-Nevis-Anguilla.
- Claude Bartholomew, Sergeant, Royal Grenada Police Force. For services to youth.
- Etheline Christian, Head Telephonist, Antigua.
- Charles Alexander Davids, Warden, Parish Home, Saint Helena.
- William Piaito, Assistant Forester, Forestry Department, British Solomon Islands Protectorate.
- Georges Pragassen, Building Inspector (Acting Inspector of Works), Public Works Department, Seychelles.
- Milly Rock, Matron, Dominica Infirmary, Roseau, Dominica.
- George Charles Wells, Foreman of Works, Public Works Department, Saint Christopher-Nevis-Anguilla.

State of New South Wales

- Henry Flanagan. For services to primary industry.
- Anna Beryl Hatton. For services to sport.
- George Samuel Clarence Lang. For services to the community in South Sydney.
- Samuel Manning Martin. For services to the community in Burrell Creek.
- Mary Josephine O'Rourke. For services to medicine.
- Cecil Ernest Parrish. For services to the community in Wollongong.
- Doris Florence Quinlan. For services to the community, particularly the Red Cross Society in Newcastle.
- Charles Wentworth Stewart. For services to the community in Bedgerebong.
- Charles Kenneth Thompson. For services to the community in Northern New South Wales.

State of Victoria

- Sergeant John Balshaw, Ringwood-Nunawading Rescue Squad, St. John Ambulance Brigade.
- Francis James Bedggood. For services to the Corps of Commissionaires.
- Edward George Bran. For services to the Corps of Commissionaires.
- Clarence Bain Davie. For services to the community in Glen Iris.
- Joseph Alexander Fogg, Manager, Northcote City Baths. For services to swimming.
- Corporal Stewart Granger, Footscray Rescue Squad, St. John Ambulance Brigade.
- Corporal Valerie Green, Ormond Mobile Nursing Section, St. John Ambulance Brigade.
- Private Michael Knight, Shepparton Rescue Squad, St. John Ambulance Brigade.
- Inez York, Telephone Switchboard Operator, Government House, Melbourne.

State of Queensland

- James Walker, Butler, Government House, Brisbane.

State of Western Australia

- John Corbett. For services to intellectually disabled children in Western Australia.
- Patricia Dawn McPherson. For services to the community in the northern area of Western Australia.
- Rita Grace Patching. For services to the community in Western Australia.
- Emma Sherrington. For services to the community in Cunderdin.

=== Royal Red Cross (RRC) ===
- Colonel Marily Fabien, ARRC, (208121), Queen Alexandra's Royal Army Nursing Corps.
- Wing Officer Vera Minnie Jessie Silcock (406434), Princess Mary's Royal Air Force Nursing Service.

==== Associate of the Royal Red Cross (ARRC) ====
- Eirene Stella Marice Luckcraft, Superintending Sister (Matron), Queen Alexandra's Royal Naval Nursing Service.
- Anna Maria Tynan, Superintending Sister (Matron), Queen Alexandra's Royal Naval Nursing Service.
- Major Nora Theresa Cleary (462834), Queen Alexandra's Royal Army Nursing Corps.

=== Air Force Cross (AFC) ===
Royal Navy

- Lieutenant Commander Patrick Ian Normand.
- Lieutenant Richard Oliver Sutton.

Royal Air Force

- Wing Commander Michael Keith Adams (4111758).
- Wing Commander Roy Leslie Bennett (3046022).
- Wing Commander John Michael Anthony Parker (607208).
- Wing Commander Ronald Charles Wood (607161).
- Squadron Leader Martin Elis Bee (607744).
- Squadron Leader Paul Frederick Hobley (583438).
- Squadron Leader Tom Leslie Lecky-Thompson (3515345).
- Squadron Leader Graham Charles Williams (607676).
- Acting Squadron Leader Ronald Montgomery Kerr (507532).
- Acting Squadron Leader Herbert Marshall (1588422), for services with the Royal Brunei Malay Regiment.
- Flight Lieutenant Walter Gregory George (1585621).
- Flight Lieutenant Jack Stewart Hindle (58255).
- Flight Lieutenant John Frederick Larcombe (2620472).
- Flight Lieutenant Robert Derek Lightfoot (608102).

=== Air Force Medal (AFM) ===
- L3526433 Sergeant John Dungate, Royal Air Force.

=== Queen's Police Medal (QPM) ===
England and Wales

- Arthur Morgan Rees, OBE, Chief Constable, Staffordshire County and Stoke-on-Trent Constabulary.
- James Angus, Chief Constable, Leeds City Police.
- William Thomas Cavey, Chief Constable, Cumbria Constabulary.
- Robert Linge, Deputy Assistant Commissioner, Metropolitan Police.
- Albert Johnson, MBE, Deputy Chief Constable, Lincolnshire Constabulary.
- Godfrey Dickson Rayner, Assistant Chief Constable, Derby County and Borough Constabulary.
- John St. David Jones, Assistant Chief Constable, Gwynedd Constabulary.
- Frederick James Sheppard, MC, Commander, Metropolitan Police.
- Patrick Victor Collier, Commander, Metropolitan Police.
- Harry Thomas, lately Chief Superintendent, Gloucestershire Constabulary.
- Nicholas Joseph Brennan, Chief Superintendent, Birmingham City Police.
- Donald Bertram Sylvester Adams, Chief Superintendent, Metropolitan Police.
- Edward Craghill, Superintendent, Northumberland Constabulary—seconded as Staff Officer to Her Majesty's Inspector of Constabulary, Newcastle upon Tyne.
- Joan Parker, Woman Superintendent, Durham Constabulary.

Scotland

- Robert Morrison Clark, OBE, Assistant Chief Constable, Lanarkshire Constabulary.
- William Bruce White, Chief Superintendent, Fife Constabulary.

Northern Ireland

- Samuel John Bradley, MBE, County Inspector, Royal Ulster Constabulary.

British Railways Board

- John Henry Goodier, Chief of Police, Eastern Area (York), British Transport Police.

State of Queensland

- Leslie Edgar Hughes, Inspector, Queensland Police Force.
- Joshua Henry Holliday, Inspector, Queensland Police Force.
- Matthew Carmody Dwyer, Inspector, Queensland Police Force.
- Gordon William Mouatt, lately Inspector, Queensland Police Force.

State of South Australia

- Rex Kenneth Geue, Inspector, 1st Class, South Australian Police Force.
- Laurence Vernon Lenton, Inspector, 1st Class, South Australian Police Force.
- Herbert Keith Lockwood, Inspector, 1st Class, South Australian Police Force.

State of Western Australia

- Athel Logan Moore Wedd, Deputy Commissioner, Western Australian Police Force.
- Herbert Douglas Burrows, Superintendent, Western Australia Police Force.

State of Tasmania

- John Alfred Rowland Gallahar, Deputy Commissioner, Tasmania Police Force.
- Eric Gordon Cole, Detective Inspector, Tasmania Police Force.

Nigeria

- Richard Simon John Popkess, Acting Chief Superintendent, Nigeria Police.
- Edward William Crewe, Acting Assistant Commissioner, Nigeria Police.

Overseas Territories

- Christopher John Rowland Dawson, Assistant Commissioner, Royal Hong Kong Police Force.
- Ivan Victor Fitz-Clarence Quarless, lately Commissioner, Royal Grenada Police Force.

=== Queen's Fire Services Medal (QFSM) ===
England and Wales

- Kenneth Charles Bridges, Chief Officer, Berkshire and Reading Fire Brigade.
- George Henry Merrell, Chief Officer, Birmingham Fire Brigade.
- Harry Lomas, Chief Qfficer, Manchester Fire Brigade.
- William Young Hagan, Assistant Chief Officer, Durham Fire Brigade.
- Herbert Griffiths, Chief Officer, Walsall Fire Brigade.

=== Colonial Police Medal (CPM) ===
Brunei

- Mohammed bin Abdul Momin, Deputy Superintendent (Acting Superintendent), Royal Brunei Police Force.
- Thomas Stevenson Swan, Superintendent, Royal Brunei Police Force.

Overseas Territories

- Owen Douglas Brisbane, OBE, Lieutenant, Saint Vincent Auxiliary Police Force.
- Edward Arnold Brown, Assistant Superintendent, British Honduras Police Force.
- Archibald John Chan Tai-wmg, Superintendent, Royal Hong Kong Auxiliary Police Force.
- David Austin Chapman, Superintendent, Royal Hong Kong Police Force.
- Cheung Wing-tai, Sergeant, Royal Hong Kong Police Force.
- Patrick Joseph Clancy, Superintendent, Royal Hong Kong Police Force.
- Fred Henri Denis, Assistant Superintendent, Seychelles Police Force.
- Henry Arthur Giblett, Superintendent (Acting Senior Superintendent) Royal Hong Kong Police Force.
- James Collis Kenworthy, Assistant Superintendent, Solomon Islands Police Force.
- Michael Ko Chun, Superintendent, Royal Hong Kong Police Force.
- Lau Yam-choi, Staff Sergeant Class II, Royal Hong Kong Police Force.
- Leung Kwok-wing, Sergeant, Royal Hong Kong Auxiliary Police Force.
- Leung Tai-chor, Ambulance Dresser, Ambulance Division, Hong Kong Fire Services Department.
- David George Lloyd, Superintendent, Royal Hong Kong Police Force.
- Marjorie Elsie Lovell, Woman Superintendent, Royal Hong Kong Police Force.
- Anthony James Lyster, Chief Inspector, Royal Hong Kong Police Force.
- John Malachi Martin, Superintendent, Royal Hong Kong Police Force.
- William Percival Morgan, DFM, Superintendent, Royal Hong Kong Police Force.
- Sydney Murphy, Station Sergeant, Royal Saint Vincent Police Force.
- Sin Hi, Principal Fireman, Hong Kong Fire Services.
- Bernard David Sutton, Superintendent, Fiji Police Force.
- Daniel Tai Chung-ling, Senior Inspector, Royal Hong Kong Auxiliary Police Force.
- Watt Hew-ki, Divisional Officer, Hong Kong Auxiliary Fire Service.

=== Queen's Commendation for Valuable Service in the Air ===
Royal Navy

- Lieutenant Commander Robert Neil Blair.

Army

- Captain Michael Johnston Richards (467623), 1st The Queen's Dragoon Guards.

Royal Air Force

- Acting Wing Commander Noel Garner Sewell (4040447).
- Squadron Leader Bryan Richard Carter (3507843).
- Squadron Leader Terence Patrick Cripps (2753519).
- Squadron Leader Desmond Patrick English (4031808).
- Squadron Leader William Harold George Freeman (579317).
- Squadron Leader David Maurice Goodwin (2492770).
- Squadron Leader Brian Hopkins (3514139).
- Squadron Leader Ewan Havard Hunter (607925).
- Squadron Leader Cecil Gerald Dunbar Jonklaas (607207).
- Squadron Leader Keith Gilbart Monson (2704397).
- Acting Squadron Leader Antony John Craig (609160).
- Acting Squadron Leader Frederick John Loveridge, AFM, (1322449).
- Flight Lieutenant Richard Anthony Cowling (4080250).
- Flight Lieutenant Frederick William Philip Cox (199536).
- Flight Lieutenant Hugh Barthram Lake (4230665).
- Flight Lieutenant Keven Brian Mace (608359).
- Flight Lieutenant John Lorenzo Martin (4082605).
- Flight Lieutenant William Purchase (506051).
- Flight Lieutenant Anthony John Raley (507078), for services with the Royal Malaysian Air Force.
- Flight Lieutenant Ronald George Rhodes (3504347).
- Flight Lieutenant Peter Ripley (4230251), for services with the British Joint Services Training Team, Zambia.
- Flight Lieutenant Stanley John Venton (577148).
- Flight Lieutenant Richard Gordon Waddell (4066596).
- Flight Lieutenant Edward Gilbert Whitall (167331).
- Master Pilot Bryan Noel Edwards (R1451461).
- Master Pilot John Marshall McQuie Walker (Al583420).
- Master Engineer Percy Thomas Bridger (E1805652).
- Master Engineer William Cash (F1625690).

United Kingdom

- Phillip James Barley, Senior Scientific Assistant, Royal Aircraft Establishment, Farnborough, Ministry of Technology.
- Anthony Lionel Blackman, Deputy Chief Test Pilot, Hawker Siddeley Aviation Ltd., Stockport, Cheshire.
- Timothy Maynard Scott Ferguson, Deputy Chief Test Pilot, British Aircraft Corporation Ltd., Warton Aerodrome, Preston.
- Alan Richardson Martin, AFC, Senior Training Captain (Viscounts), British European Airways.
- Dennis Whitham, Deputy Chief Test Pilot, Rolls-Royce Ltd., Hucknall Aerodrome, Nottingham.

== Australia ==
=== Knight Bachelor ===
- Brian William Hone, OBE, of South Yarra, Victoria. For distinguished services to education.
- Ronald Arthur Irish, OBE, of Castle Hill, New South Wales. For distinguished services to commerce and industry.
- Brigadier Arthur William McIlveen, MBE, of Bexley, New South Wales. For distinguished services to Servicemen and ex-Servicemen.
- Kenneth Beeson Noad, MD, ChM, of Bellevue Hill, New South Wales. For distinguished services to medicine.
- Ernest William Titterton, CMG, Professor of Nuclear Physics, Australian National University.
- Harold Leslie White, CBE, National Librarian, National Library, Canberra.

=== Order of the Bath ===
==== Companion of the Order of the Bath (CB) ====
Military Division

- Major General Mervyn Francis Brogan, CBE, (231), Australian Staff Corps.

=== Order of Saint Michael and Saint George ===
==== Knight Commander of the Order of St Michael and St George (KCMG) ====
- The Honourable William John Aston, MP, Speaker of the House of Representatives.

==== Companion of the Order of St Michael and St George (CMG) ====
- Clement Roy Nichols, OBE, of Kew, Victoria. For services to the Boy Scouts Association.
- John Lawson Shute, OBE, of Killara, New South Wales. For public service.
- Douglas Frew Waterhouse, Chief, Division of Entomology, Commonwealth Scientific and Industrial Research Organisation.

=== Order of the British Empire ===
==== Knight Commander of the Order of the British Empire (KBE) ====
Civil Division

- Senator Magnus Cameron Cormack, of Lower Crawford, Victoria. For long political and public service.
- The Honourable Allen Fairhall, lately Minister for Defence. For long and distinguished service to Australia.
- Sir Charles George McDonald, CBE, ChM, FRCP, Chancellor, Sydney University.

==== Commander of the Order of the British Empire (CBE) ====
Military Division

- Rear Admiral Hugh David Stevenson, Royal Australian Navy; Deputy Chief of the Naval Staff.
- Brigadier George Frederick Larkin, OBE, (247), Australian Staff Corps.
- Air Commodore Colin Rex Taylor (03372), Royal Australian Air Force.

Civil Division

- Eric Nugent Avery, of Malvern, Victoria, For services to secondary industry.
- Joseph James Clark, of Broken Hill, New South Wales. For long political and public service.
- Robert Crichton-Brown, of Bellevue Hill, New South Wales. For services to yachting.
- The Honourable Frederick Charles Chaney, AFC, of Mount Lawley, Western Australia. For long political and public service.
- Francis John Duval, of Tokyo, Japan. For services to secondary industry and export.
- The Honourable Mr. Justice John Angus Nimmo, QC, of North Balwyn, Victoria. For public service.
- Gustav Joseph Victor Nossal, FRACP, BS, of Kew, Victoria. For services to medical research.
- William Howard Wilcock, of Mount Eliza, Victoria. For public service.
- Frederick Munro Wiltshire, OBE, of South Yarra, Victoria. For services to secondary industry and education.

==== Officer of the Order of the British Empire (OBE) ====
Military Division

Royal Australian Navy

- Captain Peter Hogarth Doyle.
- Electrical Commander Robert Arthur May, Royal Australian Navy Emergency List.

Australian Military Forces

- Colonel Geoffrey Gossip Harkness, ED, MB, BS, (377537), Royal Australian Army Medical Corps.
- Colonel John Maurice Maxwell (2265), Australian Staff Corps.
- Lieutenant Colonel (Temporary Colonel) Andrew John Milner (628), Australian Staff Corps.
- Colonel Derek Montague Skitt (337630), Royal Australian Army Ordnance Corps.

Royal Australian Air Force

- Wing Commander Harold Raymond Barber (022154).
- Group Captain Gerald Francis Ell (0363).

Civil Division

- Captain Alexander Arthur Barlow, Manager, Far East and Tasman Divisions, Qantas Airways Ltd.
- John Frederick Barns, of Toorak, Victoria. For services to secondary industry.
- Arthur Merric Bloomfield Boyd, of London. For services to art.
- Betty Alice Burton, formerly National President, Y.W.C.A. of Australia.
- Zoe Whitehead (Zoe Caldwell), of New York. For services to the theatre.
- Frank Adams Callaway, Professor of Music, University of Western Australia.
- Cecil Austin Gibb, Deputy Chairman, School of General Studies, Australian National University.
- Eric Hyman Goulston, MB, FRACS, of Sydney, New South Wales, For services to medicine and international relations.
- John Whitefoord Heyer, of London. For services to the film industry.
- Ursula Hoff, Assistant Director and Senior Curator, National Gallery, Victoria.
- George Henry Johnston, of Mosman, New South Wales. For services to literature.
- Paul Osborne Jones, of Double Bay, New South Wales. For services to art.
- Alexander George William Keys, MC, National Secretary, Returned Services League.
- Ackland Archibald Lord, of Toorak, Victoria. For services to the community.
- Bruce Roy Macklin, of Glenunga, South Australia. For services to commerce.
- Mervyn William Oakley, First Assistant Secretary, Marketing Division, Department of Primary Industry.
- Frank Commons Pryor, First Assistant Secretary, General Financial and Economic Policy Division, Department of the Treasury.
- Albert Ernest Rogers, of South Perth, Western Australia. For services to the mining industry.
- David Barry Scott, Librarian, Macquarie University.
- Keith Archibald Smith, Commissioner of Commonwealth Railways.
- Stanley Edgar Solomon, of Corinda, Queensland. For public service.
- Patience Rosemary Thoms, President, International Federation of Business and Professional Women.
- Donald Dean von Bibra, of Ross, Tasmania. For services to primary industry.
- Atau Waukave, Vice President, Local Government Council, Goroka, Territory of Papua and New Guinea.
- James Bawtree Webb, formerly Director, Overseas Service Bureau.

==== Member of the Order of the British Empire (MBE) ====
Military Division

Royal Australian Navy

- Acting Sea Cadet Lieutenant Commander Frank George Thornton Dixon, Australian Sea Cadet Corps.
- Lieutenant Commander Roger Francis Patrick Farnham Moag.

Australian Military Forces

- Major Raymond Baxter (1905026), Royal Australian Infantry Corps.
- Major (Quartermaster) Leslie Lehmann Farrow (4118), Royal Australian Infantry Corps.
- Major Arthur Vincent Giles, DCM, (2905078), Royal Australian Engineers.
- Major John Russell Hayward (340101), Australian Staff Corps.
- Warrant Officer Class I Brian Leonard Kent (31916), Royal Australian Engineers.
- Warrant Officer Class I Leslie James Kidd (1774), Royal Australian Artillery Corps.
- Major Janice Margaret McCabe, ED, (F11430), Women's Royal Australian Army Corps.
- Warrant Officer Class II Anthony Fancourt Parkinson (2180758), Royal Australian Engineers.
- Warrant Officer Class I James Gray Whitecross (54772), Royal Australian Band Corps.
- Major (Quartermaster) Edgar John Wilkins (3379), Royal Australian Engineers.

Royal Australian Air Force

- Flight Lieutenant Colin Patrick Gabbett (031142).
- Flying Officer John William Gildersleeve (0216438).
- Flight Lieutenant Ian Kitchener Keith Nelson Norris (022014).
- Warrant Officer Thomas Robertson (A32154).
- Warrant Officer Dudley Sharpe (A21508).

Civil Division

- Nandjwarra Amagula, of Groote Island, Northern Territory. For services to the community.
- Lieutenant Andrew John Balsillie. For services to the Australian War Memorial.
- Colin Barnard, formerly Principal Research Officer and Head of Plant Introduction Section, Commonwealth Scientific and Industrial Research Organisation.
- Stanley Frank Barnes, Project Officer, Australian Dairy Produce Board.
- John Duncan Campbell, formerly Assistant Director-General (Radio Section, Engineering Works Division), Postmaster-General's Department.
- Clifford Eliot Clarke, Private Secretary to the Minister for Repatriation.
- Hope Clayton, Executive Officer, Australian Council of Social Service.
- Colin William Clugston, Assistant Secretary (Defence Planning), Department of Defence.
- Felix Albert Edward Collas, formerly Assistant Controller, Stamps and Philatelic Section, Postmaster-General's Department.
- Thomas Talbot Colquhoun, Assistant Secretary, War Services Land Settlement Branch, Department of Primary Industry.
- Christine Davy, of Alice Springs, Northern Territory. For services to civil aviation.
- Walter Grattan Douglas, Regional Controller, Department of Shipping and Transport, Queensland.
- Arthur Ernest Enders, of Carag Carag, Victoria. For services to local government and primary industry.
- Myrtle Magdalene Fawcett, of Adelaide River, Northern Territory. For services to the community.
- Merton Mary Esther Flanagan, formerly Matron, Repatriation General Hospital, Concord, New South Wales.
- Mollie Florence Foster, of Milsons Point, New South Wales. For public service.
- Peter Funda, Assistant Commissioner, Development, National Capital Development Commission.
- Hera Ganiga, formerly Personnel Officer, Papuan Medical College.
- David Harvey-Sutton, ED, MB, BS, of Cloncurry, Queensland. For services to local government and the community.
- Stanley Gilbert Hawes, Producer-in-Chief, Australian Commonwealth Film Unit, Department of the Interior.
- John Graham Hawkins, MB, BS, Senior Registrar (Surgery), Alice Springs Hospital.
- Ruth Hayward, of Cremorne, New South Wales. For services to the community.
- Gladys Ivy Holt, of North Strathfield, New South Wales. For services to the community.
- William Alfred Thomas Howe, Chairman, Promotions Appeal Committee, Commonwealth Public Service Inspector's Office, Adelaide.
- Alderman Frederick William Leslie Hutley, of Artarmon, New South Wales. For services to the community.
- Harold Francis Lobb, formerly Principal, Newcastle Branch, New South Wales Conservatorium of Music.
- Charles Harold Lundberg, of Condong, New South Wales. For services to local government and the sugar cane industry.
- Margaret Ethel Macfarlan, of Gladstone, Queensland. For services to journalism and the community.
- James Edward Meredith, Principal Technical Officer, Joint House Department.
- Harold William Gilbert Nobbs, Officer Commanding, Volunteer Coastal Patrol, Sydney.
- Janet Amelia Noland, of Auburn, New South Wales. For services to the community.
- Eileen O'Connor, Private Secretary to a former Minister for Education and Science.
- Warren George Osmond, JP, State Secretary, New South Wales Branch, Returned Services League.
- Ralph Edward Pennington, of South Perth, Western Australia. For services as a member of Australian Aid Teams in South Vietnam.
- Thomas Price, of Hornsby, New South Wales. For services to the community.
- Thomas Reid, Engineer Class 4, Station Controller Honeysuckle Creek Tracking Station, Department of Supply.
- Robert Walter Ridley, Divisional Aircraft Surveyor, Department of Civil Aviation, Perth.
- Richard Athol Rowe, DCM, Treasurer, Tasmanian Division, Australian Red Cross Society.
- Alan Aubrey Salter, JP, Superintendent, Personnel Branch, Postmaster-General's Department, Launceston.
- Arthur Henry Schutt, of Beaumaris, Victoria. For services to civil aviation.
- William Francis Sharpe, Regional Director, Department of Labour and National Service, South Australia.
- Dorothy Edith Shaw, Chief Plant Pathologist, Department of Agriculture, Stock and Fisheries, Papua and New Guinea.
- Cecil Arthur Simpson, JP, of Lugarno, New South Wales. For services to ex-Servicemen and women.
- Geoffrey Malcolm Stiff, Experimental Officer, David Rivett Laboratory, Chemical Physics Division, Commonwealth Scientific and Industrial Research Organisation.
- Frederick Charles Ward, of Braddon, Australian Capital Territory. For services to industrial design.
- Allan Raymond Williams, of Dandenong, Victoria. For services to migrants.
- Eric Worrell, of Wyoming, New South Wales. For services to herpetology.

=== Companion of the Imperial Service Order (ISO) ===
- Francis William Collopy, AFM, formerly Regional Director, South Australia-Northern Territory Region, Department of Civil Aviation.
- Henry Keith Hughes Cook, Senior Australian Trade Commissioner, New York.
- Leonard George Redmond, Director of Works, Darwin.

=== British Empire Medal (BEM) ===
Military Division
Royal Australian Navy

- Chief Petty Officer Coxswain George Edwin Campbell (R31816).
- Chief Petty Officer Robert John Clark (R41118).
- Chief Petty Officer Steward Lionel Binnie Dunstone (R21710), Royal Australian Navy Volunteer Reserve.
- Chief Petty Officer Percival William Jarrett (R30813).

Australian Military Forces

- Sergeant Fernea Marjorie Fossey (F35009), Women's Royal Australian Army Corps.
- Corporal Margaret Hilda Gibson (F35033), Women's Royal Australian Army Corps.
- Sergeant Frank Arthur Thomas Hennell (246778), Royal Australian Army Medical Corps.
- Sergeant Tuvui Lap An (81874), Royal Australian Infantry Corps.
- Sergeant William Joseph Oxenham (5974), Royal Australian Corps of Signals.
- Staff Sergeant Norman Ralston (280147), Royal Australian Infantry Corps.
- Warrant Officer Class II Ronald Francis Sigg (33889), Royal Australian Infantry Corps.
- Staff Sergeant Elmer Gregory Weir (173606), Royal Australian Engineers.

Royal Australian Air Force

- Sergeant Harold James Cooper (A55645).
- Sergeant Allan Elliott (A217677).
- Sergeant John Kenneth Murray (A15279).
- Sergeant Iris Jane Selby (W216196), Women's Royal Australian Air Force.
- Flight Sergeant Brian William Smith (A55679).

Civil Division

- Gotheb Ernest Aberle, MM, of Bicton, Western Australia. For services to ex-Servicemen and women.
- George Keith Avent, formerly Senior Welfare Officer, Postmaster-General's Department, Victoria.
- Helena Joyce Bennett, of Puckapunyal, Victoria. For services to the community.
- Walter Mathew Bradley, Clerk, Department of External Territories.
- Ernest Owen Brown, Executive Officer, Commonwealth Electoral Office, Department of the Interior.
- John Westacott Buchanan, of Kogarah, New South Wales. For services to the community.
- Sergeant First Class Bus, Papua and New Guinea Police Force, Manus Island.
- Blair Thisbe Cook, Clerk, Office of the High Commissioner for Australia, London.
- Cyril Wilfred Davis, Senior Technical Officer Grade 2, General Overseer and Superintendent of Inspection Branch, Department of the Navy, New South Wales.
- Mabel Laurel Dimmock, of Glendonbrook, New South Wales. For services to the community.
- Alma Dodd, President, Narrabeen War Veterans Home Women's Auxiliary.
- Janet Ruth Donoghoe, of Reid, Australian Capital Territory. For services to the community.
- Michael Fabila, of Port Moresby, Territory of Papua and New Guinea. For services to sport.
- Beryl Mavis Fox, Steno-Secretary to the Director-General of Civil Aviation.
- Owen Robert Francis, Clerk, Finance and Accounting Branch, Postmaster-General's Department, Sydney.
- Douglas William Glanvill, Senior Technical Officer Grade 3, Aeronautical Research Laboratories.
- Sydney Frederick Harmer, Senior Technical Officer Grade 2, Central Office, Postmaster-General's Department.
- Catherine Rose Hayes, formerly Assistant Private Secretary to the Minister for Defence.
- Sidney Goodwin Hiatt, of St. Georges, South Australia. For services to the community.
- Eric Barrett Hill, of Newcastle, New South Wales. For services to the community.
- Arthur Alden Kahler, of Bingara, New South Wales. For services to the community.
- Kathleen May Kahler, President, Gladstone Branch, Australian Red Cross Society.
- Joyce Kelley, Steno-Secretary to the Secretary Repatriation Department.
- Florence Knight, of Long Jetty, New South Wales. For services to the community.
- Lewis James Lind, of Northwood, New South Wales. For services to the community.
- Leslie George Mahoney, formerly Personal Assistant to Director-General, Department of Health.
- Marjory Marsh, of Greenock, South Australia. For services to the community.
- Hugh McKerral, Clerk, Central Office, Postmaster-General's Department, Perth.
- George Stuart Newman, Supervisor (Telegraph) Grade 2, Postmaster-General's Department, Perth.
- Elsie May Nies, of Coogee, New South Wales. For services to ex-Servicemen and women.
- Eleanor O'Keefe, of Kingstown, New South Wales. For services to the community.
- Edna Judith Parker, Assistant Private Secretary to the Minister for Supply.
- Teddy Plummer, of Warrabri, Northern Territory. For services to the community.
- Joseph Herbert Porter, Chauffeur to the Australian High Commissioner, London.
- Naomi Benetia Power, Steno-Secretary to the Commissioner for Taxation.
- Adelaide Daphne Raymond, of Wynnum Heights, Queensland. For services to the community.
- John Rooks, Flight Service Supervisor Grade 2, Department of Civil Aviation, Townsville, Queensland.
- Bryan Thomas Spencer, formerly Clerk, Department of Trade and Industry, Sydney.
- Lorna Bessie Smith, of Singleton, New South Wales. For services to the community.
- Myrtle Gertrude Smith, JP, of Young, New South Wales. For services to ex-Servicemen and women.
- Albert Joseph Stewart, Senior Master of Launch, Quarantine Branch, Department of Health, New South Wales.
- Leslie Stewart, DSM, Draftsman Grade 3, Hydrographic Office, Department of the Navy, Sydney.
- Arthur Sydney Tanner, of Gymea, New South Wales. For services to sport.
- Arthur James Taylor, formerly Clerk, Finance Branch, Central Office, Department of Civil Aviation.
- Harold George Taylor, Manager, Provision Stores, Commonwealth Railways, South Australia.
- Myra Victoria Thomson, President, the Art Gallery and Conservatorium Committee, Newcastle.
- Maude Minilya Waite, President, Northwest-Murchison Branch, Australian Red Cross Society.
- Allen Elkington Wane, Senior Inspector Grade 2, Department of the Navy, Sydney.
- Evelyne May Watson, of Cronulla, New South Wales. For services to the community.
- William George Watts, Head Chauffeur, Australia House, London.
- John Raymond Wood, Car Driver, Department of Supply.
- Stanley Hughendon Yandell, Supervisor, Parks and Gardens Section, Department of the Interior, Canberra.
- Helmuth Richard Zehender, Clerk, Supply Section, Weapons Research Establishment, Woomera.

=== Royal Red Cross (RRC) ===
==== Associate of the Royal Red Cross (ARRC) ====
- Squadron Officer Veronica Annie McMinn (N216849), Royal Australian Air Force Nursing Service.
- Squadron Officer Kathleen Alder Orgill (N51569), Royal Australian Air Force Nursing Service.

=== Air Force Cross (AFC) ===
- Squadron Leader Richard Cromwell Moore (042850), Royal Australian Air Force.

=== Queen's Commendation for Valuable Service in the Air ===
- Lieutenant (Temporary Captain) Peter Merryll Ingram (54729), Australian Staff Corps; allotted to Australian Army Aviation Corps.
- Major Graeme Hill-Smith (28356), Australian Army Aviation Corps.

== Sierra Leone ==
=== Order of the British Empire ===
==== Commander of the Order of the British Empire (CBE) ====
Civil Division

- The Most Reverend Moses Nathanael Christopher Omobiala Scott, DD, Archbishop of West Africa.

==== Officer of the Order of the British Empire (OBE) ====
Civil Division

- James Campbell, lately Vice-Chairman and Managing Director, Sierra Leone Development Co. Ltd.
- Jacob Arthur Christian Davies, Chairman, Public Service Commission.
- Thomas Frederick Hope, MBE, General Manager and Engineer-in-Chief, Guma Valley Water Company, Freetown.
- Paramount Chief Bartholomew Aloysius Foday-Kai, JP, Paramount Chief of Jaiama-Bongor Chiefdom, Southern Province.
- John Burdett Morten, lately Resident Director, Sierra Leone Selection Trust.

==== Member of the Order of the British Empire (MBE) ====
Military Division

- Warrant Officer Class I Fakundi Jawara (SLA/28866), Royal Sierra Leone Military Forces.

Civil Division

- Paramount Chief Ndomawa Banya, Paramount Chief of Kongbora Chiefdom, Southern Province.
- Alhaj Abu Bakarr Tejan-Jalloh, JP. For services to the community.
- Sarah Winifred Shears, Head of Registry, Police Headquarters, Freetown.

=== Companion of the Imperial Service Order (ISO) ===
- Samuel Molubu Jellicoe Cassel, lately Assistant Government Printer.

=== British Empire Medal (BEM) ===
Military Division

- Staff Sergeant Joseph Emmanuel Gideon Tucker, Royal Sierra Leone Military Forces.

Civil Division

- Lacton Ayo Bishop, Cinema Officer, Ministry of Information and Broadcasting.

=== Queen's Police Medal (QPM) ===
- Gbassay Kamara, Chief Superintendent (Acting Assistant Commissioner), Sierra Leone Police Force.
- Henry Wilmotson Shyllon, Chief Superintendent, Sierra Leone Police Force.

== Gambia ==
=== Knight Bachelor ===
- The Honourable Alieu Sulayman Jack, MP, Speaker of the House of Representatives.

=== Order of the British Empire ===
==== Officer of the Order of the British Empire (OBE) ====
Civil Division

- Harry Lloyd-Evans, Commissioner of Police.

==== Member of the Order of the British Empire (MBE) ====
Civil Division

- William Benoni Dougan, Storekeeper, Medical and Health Department.
- Abubakar Abdullah Gaye, Assistant Director of Posts and Telecommunications.
- Alhaji Seyfu Abu Khan, BEM, Seyfu of Jokadu District.
- Harold James David Rosser, Assistant Registrar of Co-operative Societies.

=== British Empire Medal (BEM) ===
Civil Division

- Moriba Sana Ceesay, Senior Veterinary Assistant, Veterinary Department.
- Alhaji Seyfu Momadou Krubally, Seyfu of Fulladu East District.
- Lucy Grace Mensah, lately Headteacher Class I, Malfa School.

== Guyana ==
=== Knight Bachelor ===
- The Honourable Mr. Justice Edward Victor Luckhoo, QC, Chancellor and President of the Court of Appeal.
- The Honourable Shridath Surendranauth Ramphal, CMG, QC, Attorney General and Minister of State.

=== Order of Saint Michael and Saint George ===
==== Companion of the Order of St Michael and St George (CMG) ====
- James Grant Campbell, Chairman and Managing Director, Demerara Bauxite Company. For services to the community.

== Barbados ==
=== Order of Saint Michael and Saint George ===
==== Companion of the Order of St Michael and St George (CMG) ====
- The Honourable James Cameron Tudor, MP, Minister of State for Caribbean and Latin American Affairs, and Deputy Prime Minister.

=== Order of the British Empire ===
==== Commander of the Order of the British Empire (CBE) ====
Civil Division

- Alan Morton Gill, MD, FRCP, Consultant Medical Adviser to the Barbados High Commission in the United Kingdom.
- Senator Peter George Morgan, Chairman, Barbados Tourist Board.

==== Officer of the Order of the British Empire (OBE) ====
Civil Division

- Keith Maxwell Lindbergh Johnson, Chief Engineer, Waterworks Department.
- Alwyn Theodore Wason, Chief Technical Director, Ministry of Communications and Works.

==== Member of the Order of the British Empire (MBE) ====
Civil Division

- Alwyn Simmons Howell, Senior Assistant Secretary, Ministry of Health and Community Development; Acting Permanent Secretary, Ministry of Labour, National Insurance and Housing.
- Allan Seymour Inniss, Acting Hospital Director, Queen Elizabeth Hospital.
- Christie Adolphus Smith, Honorary Secretary, Barbados Football Association.

== Mauritius ==
=== Knight Bachelor ===
- Abdool Razack Mohamed. For political and public services.
- Harilall Ranchhordas Vaghjee, Speaker, Legislative Assembly.

=== Order of Saint Michael and Saint George ===
==== Companion of the Order of St Michael and St George (CMG) ====
- Louis Regis Chaperon, MB, BS. For political and public services.

=== Order of the British Empire ===
==== Commander of the Order of the British Empire (CBE) ====
Civil Division

- Amédée Hugnin Maingard de Ville-ès-Offrans, DSO. For services to tourism and the hotel industry.

==== Officer of the Order of the British Empire (OBE) ====
Civil Division

- Malcolm de Chazal. For services to literature and art.
- Joseph Eugene Georges Rault, MRCP, MRCS, Medical Superintendent, Ministry of Health.
- Kissoonsingh Hazareesingh, lately Principal Private Secretary to the Prime Minister.

==== Member of the Order of the British Empire (MBE) ====
Civil Division

- Isaac Paul Lingaya, lately Inspector of Schools.
- Takoor Parsad Ram, lately Supervisor, Public Assistance Division, Ministry of Social Security.
- Mohammad Anwar Elahee. For services to sport.
- Jean-Georges Prosper. For composition of the National Anthem of Mauritius.
- Joseph Philippe Gentil. For composition of the National Anthem of Mauritius.
