= 1975 New Year Honours =

British royal recognitions

The New Year Honours 1975 were appointments in many of the Commonwealth realms of Queen Elizabeth II to various orders and honours to reward and highlight good works by citizens of those countries. They were announced on 1 January 1975 to celebrate the year passed and mark the beginning of 1975. These countries include Papua New Guinea, New Zealand, Mauritius, Fiji, and Grenada.

The recipients of honours are displayed here as they were styled before their new honours.

At this time honours for Australians were still being awarded in the UK honours on the advice of the premiers of Australian states. The Australian honours system began with the 1975 Queen's Birthday Honours.

At this time the two lowest classes of the Royal Victorian Order were "Member (fourth class)" and "Member (fifth class)", both with post-nominals MVO. "Member (fourth class)" was renamed "Lieutenant" (LVO) from the 1985 New Year Honours onwards.

== United Kingdom ==
=== Life peers ===
- The Right Honourable Sir William Armstrong, G.C.B., M.V.O., lately Head of the Home Civil Service.
- Richard Patrick Tallentyre Gibson, Chairman of the Arts Council of Great Britain.
- David Thomas Pitt, Chairman, Greater London Council.
- Colonel Sir Derek Wilbraham Pritchard, Chairman, Rothmans International Ltd. President, Institute of Directors.
- Sir Rudy Sternberg, Chairman, Sterling Group of Companies; Chairman, British Agricultural Export Council.

=== Privy Counsellor ===
- Joel Barnett, M.P., Chief Secretary, H M. Treasury. Member of Parliament for the Heywood and Royton Division of Lancashire.
- Roy Sydney George Hattersley, M.P., Minister of State, Foreign and Commonwealth Office. Member of Parliament for the Sparkbrook Division of Birmingham.
- Brian Kevin O'Malley, M.P., Minister of State, Department of Health and Social Security. Member of Parliament for Rotherham.

=== Knight Bachelor ===
- John Lindsay Alexander, Chairman, Ocean Transport and Trading Ltd.
- Professor James Norman Dalrymple Anderson, O.B.E., Q.C., F.B.A., Chairman, House of Laity, General Synod of the Church of England.
- Professor Arthur Llewellyn Armitage, Vice-Chancellor, Victoria University of Manchester.
- Roger Gilbert Bannister, C.B E., lately Chairman, The Sports Council.
- Edgar Charles Beck, C B.E., Chairman, John Mowlem and Company Ltd.
- Frederick Arthur Bishop, C.B, C.V.O, Director-General, The National Trust.
- William Whytehead Boulton, C B.E., T.D., Secretary of The Senate of the Inns of Court and the Bar.
- Edward Louis Britton, C B.E., General Secretary, National Union of Teachers.
- Derrick Hunton Carter, T.D., Chairman, Remploy Ltd.
- William Christie, M.B.E., Lord Mayor of the City of Belfast.
- David Charles Collins, C.B E., Chairman, Westland Aircraft Ltd. For services to Export.
- Alan Meredyth Hudson Davies, C.B.E., lately Chairman, Board of Governors, United Liverpool Hospitals.
- Frederick William Dampier Deakin, D.S.O., Historian.
- John Bealby Eastwood, Chairman, J. B. Eastwood Ltd.
- Edward Fennessy, C.B.E., Managing Director, Telecommunications, Post Office.
- Harold Montague Finniston, F.R.S., Chairman, British Steel Corporation.
- Hugh Ford, F.R.S., Professor of Mechanical Engineering, Imperial College of Science and Technology, University of London.
- Ronald George Gibson, C.B.E. For services to the development of the National Health Service.
- Albert King, O.B.E., Leader, Leeds City Council.
- William Russell Lawrence, Q.C., Senior Master of the Supreme Court (Queen's Bench Division) and Queen's Remembrancer.
- Francis Scott McFadzean, Chairman, Shell Transport and Trading Company Ltd.
- Ieuan Maddock, C.B., O.B.E., F.R.S., Chief Scientist, Department of Industry.
- John Cyprian Nightingale, C.B.E., B.E.M., Q.P.M., Chief Constable, Essex Police.
- Edward Eric Pochin, C.B.E., lately Director, Medical Research Council, Department of Clinical Research, University College Hospital Medical School.
- Arnold Joseph Philip Powell, O.B.E., Architect.
- Professor Edward Austin Gossage Robinson, C.M.G., O.B.E., F.B.A. For services to Economics.
- Louis Sherman, O.B.E., Chairman, London Boroughs Association.
- Alexander Mair Smith, Director, Manchester Polytechnic.
- Alfred George Tomkins, C.B.E., General Secretary, Furniture, Timber and Allied Trades Union.
- Horace Alan Walker, Chairman and Chief Executive, Bass-Charrington Ltd.
- Ellis Kirkham Waterhouse, C.B.E., F.B.A., Art Historian.
- John Foster Wilson, C.B.E., Director, Royal Commonwealth Society for the Blind.
- Michael Thomond Wilson, M.B.E., Chairman, Export Guarantees Advisory Council.
- John Woolf, Film Producer. Chairman, Romulus Films Ltd.

==== Diplomatic and Overseas List ====
- The Honourable George Oswald Ratteray, C.B.E., President of the Legislative Council, Bermuda.
- Garfield St Aubrun Sobers. For services to cricket.
- The Honourable Arthur Dudley Spurling, C.B.E., J.P., Speaker of the House of Assembly, Bermuda.

==== Australian States ====
State of New South Wales

- The Honourable Davis Hughes, Agent-General for New South Wales in London.
- The Honourable Kenneth Malcolm McCaw, Q.C., M.L.A., Attorney General of New South Wales.
- Alfred William Tyree, O.B.E. For services to the community.

State of Victoria

- The Honourable Mr Justice Oliver James Gillard. For services to the legal profession and as a Judge of the Supreme Court.
- William Shearer Philip, C.M.G., M.C., of Toorak. For outstanding services as a hospital administrator.
- Thomas Langley Webb, of Toorak. For services to business.

State of Queensland

- Theodor Charles Bray, C.B.E., of Brisbane. For services to tertiary education and the newspaper industry.
- James William Foots, of Brookfield. For services to Queensland's mining industry.
- The Honourable Seymour Douglas Tooth, M.L.A., Minister for Health.

State of Western Australia

- John Edward Parker, Chairman of the State Electricity Commission.

=== Order of the Bath ===
==== Knight Grand Cross of the Order of the Bath (GCB) ====
- Admiral Sir Anthony Templer Frederick Griffith Griffin, K.C.B.
- General Sir Cecil Blacker, K.C.B., O.B.E., M.C., A.D.C.(Gen.), late Royal Armoured Corps, Colonel 5th Royal Inniskilling Dragoon Guards, Colonel Commandant Corps of Royal Military Police, Colonel Commandant Army Physical Training Corps.
- Air Chief Marshal Sir Neil Wheeler, K.C.B., C.B.E., D.S.O., D.F.C., A.F.C., Royal Air Force.

==== Knight Commander of the Order of the Bath (KCB) ====
- Vice Admiral John Anthony Rose Troup, D.S.C.*
- Admiral David Williams.
- Air Marshal Neil Cameron, C.B., C.B.E., D.S.O., D.F.C., Royal Air Force.
- Air Marshal Kenneth Charles Michael Giddings, O.B.E., D.F.C., A.F.C., Royal Air Force.
- Ian Powell Bancroft, C.B., Second Permanent Secretary, Civil Service Department.
- George Leitch, C.B., O.B.E., Chief Executive, Procurement Executive, Ministry of Defence.
- David William Shuckburgh Lidderdale, C.B., Clerk of the House of Commons.
- Ronald Robert Duncan McIntosh, C.B., Director General, National Economic Development Office.
- Douglas William Gretton Wass, C.B., Permanent Secretary, H.M. Treasury.

==== Companion of the Order of the Bath (CB) ====
===== Military Division =====
Royal Navy

- Rear Admiral James William Dunbar Cook.
- Commandant Mary Irene Talbot, Hon. A.D.C., Women's Royal Naval Service.
- Rear Admiral Alan George Watson.
- Rear Admiral Arthur Brooke Webb.

Army

- Major-General Edward John Sidney Burnett, D.S.O., O.B.E., M.C., late Infantry.
- Major-General Hew Dacres George Butler, late Infantry.
- Major-General John Charles Gould, Royal Army Pay Corps.
- Major-General Harry Knutton, late Royal Regiment of Artillery.
- Major-General Alexander Matthew McKay, late Corps of Royal Electrical and Mechanical Engineers, Colonel Commandant Corps of Royal Electrical and Mechanical Engineers.
- Major-General John Michael Strawson, O.B.E., late Royal Armoured Corps.

Royal Air Force

- Air Vice-Marshal Reginald Bullen, G.M., Royal Air Force.
- Air Vice-Marshal Peter David George Terry, A.F.C., Royal Air Force.
- Air Commodore Molly Greenwood Allott, A.D.C, Women's Royal Air Force.
- Air Commodore Melvin Clifford Seymour Shepherd, O.B E., Royal Air Force.

===== Civil Division =====
- Sir William Godfrey Agnew, K.C.V.O., lately Clerk in Ordinary of Her Majesty's Most Honourable Privy Council.
- John Angus Beaton, Deputy Director, Scottish Courts Administration.
- Patrick Benner, Deputy Secretary, Cabinet Office.
- Lawrence Sam Berman, Deputy Secretary, Department of Industry.
- John Wilfrid Bourne, Deputy Secretary, Lord Chancellor's Department.
- John Charles Burgh, Deputy Secretary, Department of Prices and Consumer Protection.
- Richard Philip Cave, M.V.O., Principal Clerk, Judicial Office, House of Lords.
- Harold Raymond Percy Chatten, General Manager, H.M. Dockyard, Rosyth, Ministry of Defence.
- Donald John Derx, Deputy Secretary, Department of Employment.
- Hilda Mabel Hedley, Under Secretary, Department of Health and Social Security.
- Arthur Patrick Hockaday, C.M.G., Deputy Under Secretary of State, Ministry of Defence.
- Frank Basil Humphrey, Parliamentary Counsel.
- Major-General Brian St George Irwin, Director-General, Ordnance Survey.
- John Douglas Webster Janes, Deputy Secretary, Northern Ireland Office.
- Robert Hill Kidd, Second Secretary, Department of Finance, Northern Ireland.
- Peter Esmond Lazarus, Deputy Secretary, Department of the Environment.
- Anthony Keith Rawlinson, Deputy Secretary, H.M. Treasury.
- Professor John James Andrew Reid, T.D., Deputy Chief Medical Officer, Department of Health and Social Security.
- Ronald Charters Symonds. Attached Ministry of Defence.
- Ernest Vize Symons, Deputy Secretary, Board of Inland Revenue.

=== Order of St Michael and St George ===
==== Knight Grand Cross of the Order of St Michael and St George (GCMG) ====
- Sir Thomas Brimelow, K.C.M.G., O.B.E., Permanent Under-Secretary of State, Foreign and Commonwealth Office and Head of H.M. Diplomatic Service.
- The Right Honourable Sir Morrice James, K.C.M.G., C.V.O., M.B.E., British High Commissioner, Canberra.

==== Knight Commander of the Order of St Michael and St George (KCMG) ====
- Christopher Jeremy Morse. For services to the reform of the international monetary system.
- David Henry Thoroton Hildyard, C.M.G., D.F.C., United Kingdom Permanent Representative to the United Nations, Geneva.
- Maurice Oldfield, C.M.G., C.B.E., Foreign and Commonwealth Office.
- Anthony Derrick Parsons, C.M.G., M.V.O., M.C., H.M. Ambassador, Tehran.
- Andrew Alexander Steel Stark, C.M.G., C.V.O., H.M. Ambassador, Copenhagen.

==== Companion of the Order of St Michael and St George (CMG) ====
- The Right Honourable Thomas Edward, Baron Bridges, lately Private Secretary (Overseas Affairs) to the Prime Minister.
- Jon Edmund Dixon, Under Secretary, Ministry of Agriculture, Fisheries and Food.
- Peter Thomas Haskell, Director, Centre for Overseas Pest Research, Ministry of Overseas Development.
- Professor Percy Edwin Alan Johnson-Marshall. For services to town-planning particularly in the developing countries.
- William Thomas Pearce, Assistant Secretary, Department of Trade.
- Mervyn Brown, O.B.E., British High Commissioner, Dar es Salaam.
- Michael Dacres Butler, Foreign and Commonwealth Office.
- Albert James Macqueen Craig, Foreign and Commonwealth Office.
- Alan Eaton Davidson, H.M. Ambassador, Vientiane.
- Alan Clowes Goodison, Foreign and Commonwealth Office.
- James Patrick Ivan Hennessy, O.B.E., Acting British High Commissioner, Kampala.
- Alexander King, C.B.E., lately Director-General of Scientific Affairs, Organisation for Economic Cooperation and Development, Paris.
- John Henry Lambert, Minister and Deputy Commandant, British Military Government, Berlin.
- Eric George Le Tocq, British High Commissioner, Mbabane.
- Li Fook-kow, Secretary for Social Services, Hong Kong.
- Hugh Thomas Arnold Overton, H.M. Consul-General, Düsseldorf.
- Cyril Felix Rolo, O.B.E., Foreign and Commonwealth Office.
- Major General Reginald Booth Stockdale, C.B., O.B.E., lately Head of the Inspection Control Division, Armaments Control Agency, Western European Union, Paris.
- David Michael Summerhayes, Minister, H.M. Embassy, South Africa.
- John Bryan Ward-Perkins, C.B.E., lately Director of the British School of Art and Archaeology, Rome.
- Jack Cecil Westoby, lately Director of Programme Co-ordination, Forestry Department, Food and Agriculture Organisation, Rome.

===== Australian States =====
State of New South Wales

- Walter Ralston Bunning. For services to architecture.
- Professor John Loewenthal, E.D. For services to medicine.

State of Victoria

- Brigadier Percival Philip Jackson, C.B.E., of South Yarra. For services to education, and as a soldier.
- Margaret Alison Mackie, of Toorak. For services to the medical profession and as a hospital administrator.

State of Queensland

- Leslie Atherton Gerard Boyce, M.C., of Toowoomba. For services to the University of Queensland.

State of Western Australia

- Frank Adams Callaway, O B.E., Professor of Music, University of Western Australia.

=== Royal Victorian Order ===
==== Knight Commander of the Royal Victorian Order (KCVO) ====
- Lieutenant-General Sir Reginald Francis Stewart Denning, K B.E., C.B.
- Philip Stuart Milner-Barry, C.B., O.B.E.
- Ralph Southward.
- Edward George Tuckwell.

==== Commander of the Royal Victorian Order (CVO) ====
- Thomas James Barnham, M.V.O.
- Alfred Lapthorn Blake, M.C.
- Acting Air Commodore Michael Austin D'Arcy, Royal Air Force.
- Douglas Albert Guest.
- Horace Gildard White, M.V.O.

==== Member of the Royal Victorian Order (MVO) ====
Fourth Class

- Geoffrey Arthur Briggs.
- Thomas Hope Findlay, M.V.O.
- Denis de Montmorrencie Guilfoyle, O.B.E.
- Colonel Robert Harvey Hilborn, M.B E., C.D.
- Geoffrey John Eustace Jameson.
- Major Alan Lockhart McCall.
- Julia Fergusson Munro, M.V.O
- Francis Michael Nunan.
- John Clive Wilson Peacock.
- Captain Frank Wright Walton, D.F C
- Russell Dillon Wood, V.R.D.

Fifth Class

- Alan David Gordon Bell.
- Lieutenant (S) (O.C.A.) Geoffrey Connell, Royal Navy.
- Edwin George Johnson.
- Michael Vaughan Kenyon.
- Harry Ernest Pratt.
- Cyril Taylor, B.E.M.
- Miss Hester Winifred White.

==== Royal Victorian Medal (Silver) (RVM) ====
- Petty Officer Steward David Kenneth Athersuch.
- Police Constable Eric Stanley Blencoe, Metropolitan Police.
- Mary, Mrs Hickman.
- Charles Frederick Hodgson.
- Chief Communications Yeoman Gerald Rex King.
- Acting Flight Sergeant Patrick Joseph Malone, Royal Air Force.
- John Morgan.
- George William Pipkin.
- Ernest Robertson.
- Eric Savage.
- William John Stephenson Tallon.
- Police Constable Peter Leonard Tappin, Metropolitan Police.
- Ernest William Wright.

=== Order of the British Empire ===
==== Knight Grand Cross of the Order of the British Empire (GBE) ====
- The Right Honourable Nathaniel Mayer Victor, Baron Rothschild, G.M., F.R.S., lately Director General, Central Policy Review Staff, Cabinet Office.

==== Dame Commander of the Order of the British Empire (DBE) ====
- Dorothy Mary, Mrs Rees, C.B.E. For public and local government services in South Glamorgan.

===== Australian States =====
State of Victoria

- Jacobena Victoria Alice, Lady Angliss, C.B.E., of Hawthorn. For services to the community and welfare work.

==== Knight Commander of the Order of the British Empire (KBE) ====
- Surgeon Vice Admiral James Watt, Q H.S.
- Air Marshal Geoffrey Howard Dhenin, A.F.C., G.M., Q H.P., Royal Air Force.
- Charles Spencer Chaplin, Film Actor and Producer.
- Edwin Rodney Smith, President, Royal College of Surgeons of England.
- Pelham Grenville Wodehouse, Author.
- Stephen John Linley Olver, C.M.G., M.B.E., British High Commissioner, Nicosia.
- John Eric Sidney Thompson. For services to archaeology.

===== Australian States =====
State of Western Australia

- John Evenden Virtue, Senior Puisne Judge of the Supreme Court of Western Australia.

==== Commander of the Order of the British Empire (CBE) ====
===== Military Division =====
Royal Navy

- Captain Cecil Robert Peter Charles Branson, A.D.C., Royal Navy.
- Captain Kenneth Arthur Crawley, Royal Navy.
- Captain Robert William Frank Gerken, Royal Navy.
- Captain Geoffrey St. Maur Mills, A.D.C, Royal Navy.

Army

- Brigadier Sidney Ernest Dutton, M.B.E. (355689), late Royal Army Ordnance Corps (Now R.A R.O.)
- Brigadier Jack Spencer Fletcher, O.B.E. (397244), late Infantry.
- Brigadier Walter Peter Walker Robertson, O.B.E (278721) late Royal Corps of Signals, Colonel Gurkha Signals.
- Colonel George Brian Sinclair (376979), late Corps of Royal Engineers.
- Brigadier Eric David Smith, D.S.O., M.B.E. (388771), late Infantry.
- Brigadier John Nicholas Somerville (269382), late Infantry.
- Brigadier Peter George Tynan, O.B.E. (198978), late Royal Armoured Corps.

Royal Air Force

- Air Commodore Donald Percy Hall, A.F.C., Royal Air Force.
- Group Captain Michael John Armitage, Royal Air Force.
- Group Captain Richard Henry Arscott, O.B.E., Royal Air Force.
- Group Captain Kenneth Joseph Goodwin, A.F.C, Royal Air Force.
- Group Captain Douglas Herbert Richard Weston, Royal Air Force.

===== Civil Division =====
- James Aiton, Convener, County of Lanark.
- John Gray Allan, Legal Adviser and Solicitor, Crown Estate Commissioners.
- William Purdon Allan, Secretary, Scottish Football Association Ltd.
- Andrew Archibald, O.B.E., Deputy Chairman, Trustee Savings Banks Association.
- Stanley Ashburner, lately Executive Director, Property Services Agency, Department of the Environment.
- Miss Angela Baddeley (Madeline Angela, Mrs. Byam Shaw), Actress.
- Douglas George Badham, Chairman, Development Corporation for Wales.
- John Taylor Bain, Director of Education, Glasgow Education Authority.
- Lancelot Donald Abel Baron, D.F.C., Executive Director, Commonwealth Sugar Exporters' Association.
- Hugh Desmond Barry, lately Secretary, The Library Association.
- Robert Geoffrey Beldam, Chairman and Managing Director, Beldam Asbestos Company Ltd, Hounslow.
- Jack Birks, Technical Director, British Petroleum Trading
- Raymond Cyril Charles Boniface, General Manager, Basildon Development Corporation.
- Edward Bostock. For services to the community in Richmond-upon-Thames and Twickenham.
- William Bowring, lately Secretary, Leeds Regional Hospital Board.
- Professor Percy Wragg Brian, F.R.S., Member, Agricultural Research Council.
- Charles Gordon Bridge. For services to the National Economic Development Council.
- James Arthur Buckley, Member for Marketing, British Gas Corporation.
- Robert William Burchfield, Chief Editor, The Oxford English Dictionaries.
- Eric George Lapthorne Bywaters, Professor of Rheumatology, University of London.
- Thomas Carlile, Managing Director, Babcock and Wilcox Ltd.
- James Sellar Christie. For services to The British Film Institute.
- Stanley George Clarke, Chief Inspector, Prison Service, Home Office.
- Adrian Redman Collingwood, T.D., Chairman, The Eggs Authority.
- Thomas Idwal Davies, Staff Inspector (Wales), Department of Education and Science.
- William Robert Denaro, Regional Controller, West Midlands, Department of Health and Social Security.
- Alexander Mitchell Donnet, National Chairman and Scottish Regional Secretary, National Union of General and Municipal Workers.
- Miss Jessie Elizabeth Mary Edwards, lately Headmistress, Dick Sheppard School, Tulse Hill, London.
- David Lewis Evans, Chairman, Nottinghamshire Area Health Authority.
- Edwin Arthur Everett, Registrar, Shoreditch County Court.
- Stephen Lonsdale Finch, Deputy Chairman, The Weir Group Ltd. For services to Export.
- Norman Laurence Franklin, O.B.E., Chief Executive, British Nuclear Fuels Ltd.
- Neil Galbraith, Q.P.M., D.L., H.M. Inspector of Constabulary, Wales and South West Region.
- Thomas George Gibb, Group Co-ordinator, National Freight Corporation.
- Michael Nairn Gladstone, Commercial Director, Agrochemical Division, Fisons Ltd.
- Sampson Gold Stone, Chairman and Managing Director, Ward and Goldstone Ltd.
- Reginald Goodall, Conductor, Royal Opera House; for services to Music.
- Eric Thomson Goodwin, Chief Scientific Officer, National Physical Laboratory.
- Richard Gerald Grice, Chairman, Lake District Special Planning Board.
- Stewart Cathie Griffith, DFC, TD, For services to Cricket.
- Howard Granville Hanley, Urologist, St Peter's Hospitals, London.
- Denis Rawnsley Harper, lately Professor of Building, Institute of Science and Technology, University of Manchester.
- Edward Norman Harris, A.F.C. For services to the Royal Institution of Chartered Surveyors and the construction industry.
- John Ramsden Haslegrave, O.B.E., T.D., Chief Executive, Portsmouth City Council.
- Neil Geddes Clarkson Hendry, Consultant Orthopaedic Surgeon, Aberdeen Royal Infirmary.
- Miss Imogen Clare Holst, Director, Aldeburgh Festival; for services to Music.
- Professor John Pilkington Hudson, M.B E, G M., Director, Long Ashton Research Station, Bristol.
- Colonel James Hughes, O.BE., T.D., Chairman, The Royal British Legion.
- Norman Charles Hunt, Professor of Business Studies, University of Edinburgh.
- Charles Patrick Maule Hunting, T D., lately Chairman, The Hunting Group of Companies.
- Miss Pamela Hansford Johnson (The Right Honourable Pamela Helen Hansford, Lady Snow), Writer.
- Ivor Roberts-Jones, Sculptor.
- Ernest Martin Jukes, Q.C., Director-General, Engineering Employers' Federation.
- Thomas Barclay Odell Kerr, Vice-Chairman, The General Electric Company Ltd. For services to Export.
- Frederick Bruford Kitchen, lately Chairman. Van Den Berghs and Jurgens Ltd.
- Robert Anthony Bernard Leaper, Professor of Social Administration, University of Exeter.
- Leonard John Lickorish, Director General, British Tourist Authority.
- David George Luxton, lately Director, Royal Ordnance Factory, Nottingham, Ministry of Defence
- Ewen McEwen, Vice-Chairman (Engineering), Joseph Lucas Ltd.
- Paul Taunton Matthews, F.R.S., Professor of Theoretical Physics, Imperial College of Science and Technology, University of London.
- Professor Robert Charles Oliver Matthews, Chairman, Social Science Research Council.
- John Millar Meek, David Jardine Professor of Electric Power Engineering, University of Liverpool.
- Joseph Milner, Q.F.S.M., Chief Fire Officer, London Fire Brigade.
- Walter Horace Mulley, Member, Anglian Water Authority.
- John Oliver, Controller of Prison Planning and Co-ordination, Scottish Home and Health Department.
- John George Magrath Pardoe, Director General of Safety (Airworthiness), Civil Aviation Authority.
- William Train Paton, T.D, Managing Director, William Paton and Sons Ltd.
- William Francis Patton, Q.C For services to law in Northern Ireland.
- William Michael Thomas Pattrick, Principal, Central School of Art and Design.
- David Arthur Chester Peck, Foreign and Commonwealth Office.
- John Albert Cyril Prescott, Headmaster, Kirkby, Cherryfield County Junior School, Merseyside.
- Mia Lilly Kellmer Pringle (Mrs. Hooper), Director, National Children's Bureau.
- Lionel Roger Price Pugh, V.R.D., D.L., Board Member, British Steel Corporation.
- Thomas Morgan Haydn Rees, D.L., Chief Executive, Clwyd County Council
- Ernest Bradbury Robsinson, Deputy Chairman, Robinson and Sons Ltd. For services to Export.
- James Scotland, Principal, Aberdeen College of Education.
- Ernest Pattison Shanks, Q.C., Deputy Bailiff, Guernsey.
- The Honourable Michael David Sieff, Joint Managing Director, Marks and Spencer Ltd. For services to Export.
- Cedric Keith Simpson, Professor of Forensic Medicine, University of London.
- Harold Sinclair, Chairman, SSS Clutch Gears Ltd. For services to Export.
- Colonel George Michael Singleton, M.C., T.D, D.L., lately Vice-Chairman, West Midland Territorial Auxiliary and Volunteer Reserve Association.
- Miss Joyce Eva Skinner, Director, Cambridge Institute of Education.
- Stanley James Beresford Skyrme, Chief Executive, National Bus Company.
- The Very Reverend Robert Leonard Small, O.B.E. For public services in Scotland.
- Craig Connell Smellie, M.V.O., formerly Assistant Secretary, Northern Ireland Office.
- John Lindsay Eric Smith. For services to the preservation of historic buildings
- John Philip Smith, Director and Chief Engineer (Civil), Hawker Siddeley Aviation Ltd.
- Professor Harold Charles Stewart, D L., Deputy Director-General, St. John Ambulance Association and Brigade.
- Darwin Herbert Templeton. For services to industry in Northern Ireland.
- Donald Elliott Todd, Deputy Director of Engineering, British Broadcasting Corporation.
- William Henry Trethowan, Professor of Psychiatry, University of Birmingham.
- Philip Turner, Solicitor to the Post Office.
- Philip Adrian Hope-Wallace, Critic, Music and Drama, The Guardian
- Francis Leonard Waring, Chairman, Coalite and Chemical Products Ltd.
- Cyril Gordon Wastell, Secretary General of Lloyd's.
- Ronald Frank Alfred Webber, Higher Collector, Liverpool, Board of Customs and Excise
- Wattie Jesse West, Director, National Institute of Agricultural Engineering, Scottish Station.
- Frank Idris Whatley, B.E.M. For services to local government in Gwent.
- Douglas Harold Whitting, O.B.E. For services to Voluntary Service Overseas.
- Stephen Williams. For services to farming in Wales.
- John Stewart Wordie, V.R.D., Chairman of Burnham, Pelham and Soulbury Committees.
- The Right Reverend James Douglas Blair, Bishop of Dacca.
- Chung Sze-yuen, O.B.E. For public services in Hong Kong.
- Reginald Morpeth Cobb, O.B.E., For services to British commercial interests and the British community in Portugal.
- Wilfred St. Clair Daniel. For public services in St. Lucia.
- William Edwin Stuart Heath. For services to British commercial interests and the British community in Uruguay.
- Ronald Hickling, lately Counsellor, British High Commission, Canberra.
- Geoffrey Lionel Henry Hitchcock, O.B.E., British Council Representative, France.
- Casimiro Peter Hugh Tomasi Isolani, O.B.E, M.V.O., Counsellor, H.M. Embassy, Brussels.
- Annesley Keown. For services to British Commercial interests in Malaysia.
- Thomas Bernard Kirkbride, lately Director, Administrative and Financial Services, United Nations Secretariat, Geneva.
- Albert Lethbridge, lately Secretary, Consultative Committee on Administrative Questions, United Nations Secretariat, Geneva.
- Colonel Ernest Achey Loftus, O.B.E., T.D. For services to education in Zambia.
- Ronald Fraser McKeever, lately H.M. Consul-General, Naples.
- The Right Reverend John Arthur Arrowsmith, Maund, M.C., Bishop of Lesotho.
- Christopher Richards. For services to British commercial interests and the community in Ghana.
- Major William Thomas Carroll Rogerson, M B E., T.D. For services to British commercial interests in Italy.
- William Basil Scott, lately Puisne Judge, Zambia.
- Richard Alfred Simcox, M.B.E., British Council Representative, Iran.
- Alfred Joseph Vasquez. For public services in Gibraltar.
- Gerald Eugene Waddington. For public services in the Cayman Islands.

==== Officer of the Order of the British Empire (OBE) ====
===== Military Division =====
Royal Navy

- The Reverend Edward Appleyard, V.R.D., Royal Naval Reserve.
- Surgeon Captain Kenneth Morley Backhouse, V.R.D.*, Royal Naval Reserve.
- Commander (SD) Phillip James Ball, Royal Navy.
- Commander William George Berry Black, Royal Navy.
- Commander Anthony Bowen, Royal Navy.
- Commander John Frederick Carey, Royal Navy.
- Surgeon Commander David Michael Davies, Royal Navy.
- Commander Cedric Denis Fowler, Royal Navy
- Acting Commander John Raymond Hatch, Royal Navy.
- Commander Jonathan David Willoughby Husband, Royal Navy.
- Commander Anthony David Hutton, Royal Navy.
- Commander Denis Furnivall Swithinbank, DSC, Royal Navy.
- Lieutenant Colonel Michael Compton Lockwood Wilkins, Royal Marines.

Army

- Lieutenant-Colonel Richard Anthony Clay (411915) Royal Regiment of Artillery.
- Lieutenant-Colonel Philip Middleton Davies (426864), The Royal Scots (The Royal Regiment).
- Major (Now Lieutenant-Colonel) John Graham Hind (397930), Royal Tank Regiment.
- Lieutenant-Colonel Hugh Anthony Johnstone M.B.E. (420864), Royal Corps of Signals.
- Lieutenant-Colonel Roger Lewis Tudor Jones (417441), The Parachute Regiment.
- Lieutenant Colonel George Ronald Derrick Kennedy (385358), Royal Regiment of Artillery.
- Lieutenant-Colonel Robert Michael Koe (418308), The Royal Green Jackets.
- Lieutenant-Colonel (Now Colonel) Brian Hedley Marciandi (403537), The Queen's Regiment.
- Lieutenant-Colonel David Macdonald Gollan Myles T.D. (421465), Royal Army Medical Corps, Territorial and Army Volunteer Reserve.
- Lieutenant-Colonel James Bernard Ogilvie, T.D. (409235), The Queen's Regiment, Territorial and Army Volunteer Reserve.
- Lieutenant-Colonel Mark Richard Pennell, M.B.E. (368220), The Royal Green Jackets.
- Lieutenant-Colonel (Staff Quartermaster) Stanley Price (435453), The Royal Regiment of Fusiliers.
- Lieutenant-Colonel (Acting) Kenneth Arthur Spring T.D. (331060), late Royal Regiment of Artillery, Combined Cadet Force, Territorial and Army Volunteer Reserve (Now Retired).
- Lieutenant-Colonel Peter Harrison Swinhoe (427484), Royal Army Medical Corps.
- Lieutenant-Colonel Jean Valinder (232437), Royal Army Pay Corps (Now Retired).
- Lieutenant-Colonel Alan Edward Yardley (382846), Royal Army Ordnance Corps (Now R.A.R.O.).

Royal Air Force

- Acting Group Captain Myrddin Idwyll David, Royal Air Force.
- Wing Commander Stanley Walter Bainbridge (3053711), Royal Air Force.
- Wing Commander John Barrie Blakeley (2536956), Royal Air Force.
- Wing Commander Barrie Ernest Frederick Faulkner (582642), Royal Air Force.
- Wing Commander Patrick King (4151279), Royal Air Force.
- Wing Commander Peter Alfred Knapton, D.F.C. (116984), Royal Air Force.
- Wing Commander Ronald William Leppard (201551), Royal Air Force.
- Wing Commander Eric Harold Macey (4159730), Royal Air Force.
- Wing Commander John Meadows (582381), Royal Air Force.
- Wing Commander Geoffrey John Edward Moores (2469163), .Royal Air Force.
- Wing Commander Barry Hamilton Newton (607353), Royal Air Force.
- Wing Commander George Earl Ord (2456842), Royal Air Force.
- Wing Commander William George Wood (152184), Royal Air Force.

Overseas Awards

- Lieutenant Colonel Arthur John Ferrray, E.D., The Gibraltar Regiment.

===== Civil Division =====
- Agnes Frances, Mrs Allan, M.B.E., County President, City of Dundee Branch, British Red Cross Society.
- Leslie Leonard Allen, lately Principal, Willesden College of Technology.
- John Victor Caldecott Anthony, Superintending Valuer, Board of Inland Revenue.
- Yangos Antoniou, Administrative Officer, Cyprus, Ministry of Defence.
- Brian Ashley Barker, Surveyor of Historic Buildings, Greater London Council.
- Thomas Edward Barnsley, Chairman, East Midlands Regional Industrial Savings Committee.
- Cyril Frank Batchelor, B.E.M., Chairman, Barristers' Clerks' Association.
- Alan Beaney. For services to local government in West Yorkshire.
- Reginald Horace Beaver, Senior Principal, Metropolitan Police Office.
- The Reverend Reginald Charles Morris Beeny, Director, Church of England Children's Society.
- St. John Michael Clive Birt, Senior Consaltant Surgeon, Jersey General Hospital.
- Major John Freeman Fairfax Blakeborough, M.C., Writer. For services to journalism and sport.
- Raphael Braude, Senior Principal Scientific Officer, National Institute for Research in Dairying, Shinfield, Reading.
- Trevor Broom, Director of Operations, Headquarters, Central Electricity Generating Board.
- Kenneth Robson Brown, Chief Engineer, Inertial Systems Department, Edinburgh, Ferranti Ltd. For services to Export.
- Miss Mary Agnes Burr. For services to pharmacy.
- Eric Duncan Butterworth. For services to race relations in Yorkshire and the North East.
- George Canning. For services to Birmingham City Council.
- Leonard Arthur Castleton, lately Transport Manager, The Metal Box Company Ltd.
- Eric Alfred Charles Chamberlain, Director of Scientific Control, National Coal Board.
- Norman William Chappell. For services to the British Optical Association.
- Lieutenant-Colonel Dorrien Richard Wingate Graham Collins-Charlton, M.B.E., D.L., Secretary, Royal Humane Society.
- Colonel Robert James Chaundler, Administrator, National Council of Social Service.
- Victor Alfred Cheeseman, Joint Managing Director, Osram (G.E.C.) Ltd.
- John Alfred Church, Principal, Lord Chancellor's Department.
- Edward Clark, City Councillor, Glasgow.
- Robert Clemmett, M.B.E., Chief Officer (E.E.C. Co-ordination), British Railways Board.
- Janet Rosemary, Mrs. Cockcroft. For public services and particularly as a member of the Food Additives and Contaminants Committee.
- Samuel Henry Coplans. For services to the British Dental Association Trust Fund.
- Douglas Leonard Corder, Principal, Department of Education and Science.
- John William Counsell, Managing Director, The Windsor Theatre Company.
- Stanley Cramp. For services to nature conservation.
- Alfred Marshall Cubbon, Director, Manx Museum and National Trust, Isle of Man.
- David Evan James Davies, I.S.O., Chairman, The Boys' Clubs of Wales.
- Emily May Charlotte, Mrs. Davies. For public services in Clwyd.
- Eric Patrick Davies, Director of Housing, London Borough of Newham.
- Chloe Marion, Mrs. Davis, lately Chairman, Consumer Standards Advisory Committee, British Standards Institution.
- John Gilbert Davis, Consultant Bacteriologist.
- Robert William Denny, Director and Chief Engineer, Ultra Electronics Ltd., Middlesex. For services to Export.
- George Maurice Down, lately Chairman, Down Brothers and Mayer and Phelps Ltd., Surrey.
- Frederick John Drake, Headmaster, Dane Court Technical High School, Broadstairs.
- Ian Ruxton Drummond, Divisional Manager, Trent River Management Division, Severn-Trent Water Authority.
- Arthur James Dunmall, lately Senior Supply and Transport Officer, Royal Naval Armament Depot, Gosport, Ministry of Defence.
- Miss Williamina Kennedy Dunnett, Headmistress, Hoyland, Kirk Balk Comprehensive School, South Yorkshire.
- Leslie George Edwards, Principal Dancer, Royal Ballet.
- Reginald Sartin Edwards. For services to the community in Essex.
- Samuel Vincent Ellis, lately Divisional Manager, Norfolk and Suffolk River Division, Anglian Water Authority.
- Alfred Albert Ernest Ellis Ettinghausen, Controller of Stamps, Board of Inland Revenue.
- Walter Everett, Member, Chesterfield Borough Council.
- William Farley, M.C., Q.P M., Chief Constable, Gwent Constabulary.
- Patricia, Mrs. Fay, Founder Chairman, National Association of Decorative and Fine Arts Societies.
- Ronald Edwin Fouracres. For services to horticulture.
- John Duffy Fox. For services to local government and the water industry in Scotland.
- John Fry, General Medical Practitioner, Beckenham, Kent.
- Frank Stanley Gale, Q.P.M., Deputy Chief Constable, Northumbria Police.
- Peter Fawcett Garthwaite. For services to forestry.
- Clifford Gaskell, Project Designer, Martin Baker Aircraft Company Ltd.
- Winifred Gerin (Winifred Eveleen, Mrs. Lock), Author and Biographer.
- The Honourable Rosalind Mary Gibbs. For public services in Hunsdon, Hertfordshire.
- Edward Walwyn Goldstraw, Senior Group Engineer, Kent Sub-Unit, South Eastern Road Construction Unit.
- Frederic Causley Goodger, M.B.E., Head of Accounts, Commonwealth Development Corporation.
- Margaret Penrice, Mrs. Goodman, Chairman, Board of Visitors, H.M. Borstal, Hewell Grange, Redditch.
- Mordici Eleazer Gordon, Chairman, Plymouth and District Disablement Advisory Committee.
- Thomas Patterson Gorrie, Treasurer, Dumfries County Council.
- Arkyl Staveley Gough, lately Chairman, Harefield and Northwood Hospital Management Committee.
- Miss Elisabeth Mary Gravelius, Branch Director, Kent Branch, British Red Cross Society.
- Horace Kemball Greaves, Secretary, Manchester Savings Committee.
- Donald David Hainstock, Divisional Director, John Laing Construction Ltd.
- Eric Learoyd Haley, lately General Secretary, Leicester, YMCA.
- Robert Alan Hall, Principal Scientific Officer, Department of Industrial and Forensic Science, Northern Ireland.
- Harold Halliwell, M.B.E., lately Foreign and Commonwealth Office.
- Miss Margaret Frances Harris, Resident Designer, English National Opera.
- Edgar Charles Harrison, M.B.E., B.E M., Foreign and Commonwealth Office.
- John Warren Simpson Harvey. For services to forensic odontology in Scotland.
- John Francis Hayes, MM. Principal, Science Research Council.
- Alice Louisa, Mrs. Hemming, Vice-President, The Women's Council.
- William McCrorie Herbison, lately Rector of Larkhall Academy, Lanarkshire.
- Joseph Hogarth, Principal, Forestry Commission (Wales).
- Gilbert Holdsworth, Managing Director, Dodwell and Company Ltd.
- Cecil Thomas Hole, Principal, Scottish Office.
- John Hollinshead, Member, Cheshire County Council.
- Frederick Gordon Holmes, Commissioner, County of Hertford, St. John Ambulance Association and Brigade.
- Arthur Sackville Hulkes, Chairman, Romford and Grays National Insurance Local Tribunal.
- Stanley Thomas Hunt, Director, Engineering, The Express Lift Company Ltd.
- Lewis James McLean Hynd, Director and Secretary, Scottish Television Ltd.
- Thomas Jackson. For social services in Lancashire.
- Maurice Albert Jerrold. For services to the education of disabled children.
- Richard Downing Johnston, Principal Professional and Technology Officer, Department of the Environment.
- Hilda May, Mrs. Joyce, Headmistress, St Anne's County Secondary School for Girls, Fareham.
- Ronald Frederick Kempster, lately Chief Nursing Officer, St. Crispins Hospital, Northampton.
- Winifred, Mrs. Kettle, Member, Bolton Metropolitan Borough Council
- Lina Lalandi (Lina Madeleine, Mrs. Lalandi-Emery), Artistic Director, English Bach Festival.
- Thomas Milne Lauchlan, Director and Regional Controller, F M.C. (Meat) Ltd, Scotland.
- Miss Winifred Sybil Learoyd, Principal, Department of the Environment.
- John Frederick Leedham, Principal Lecturer, Educational Technology, College of Education, Loughborough
- John Crawford Leicester, Principal Inspector of Taxes, Board of Inland Revenue.
- Arthur Leighfield. For services to the Magistracy in Swindon.
- David Joel Liston, M B.E. For services to business education.
- John Charles Couvois Litton, lately Principal Scientific Officer, Ministry of Defence.
- Edward McCabe, Secretary, Defence Studies Committee, Department of External Studies, University of Oxford.
- Desmond Nicholas Brownlow McCandless, Executive Commercial Director, Short Brothers and Harland Ltd., Belfast.
- Justin Steven MacCarthy, Principal Nursing Officer, Moss Side Special Hospital, Liverpool, Department of Health and Social Security.
- Aileen Allen, Mrs. McCorkell, President, Londonderry City Branch, British Red Cross Society.
- The Right Reverend Monsignor Neil MacKellaig, lately Chairman, Board of Management, North and South Uist Hospitals.
- John Herd Mackenzie, Chairman and Managing Director, Herd and Mackenzie Ltd., Shipbuilders, Buckie.
- William Richard Maidment, Director, Libraries and Arts, London Borough of Camden
- William Harold Mallett, Chief Industrial Relations Officer, London Transport Executive
- George William Mann, Deputy Director, South Bank Concert Halls, Greater London Council.
- Sidney Ernest Thomas Martin, Member, West Midlands Metropolitan County Council and Member, Sandwell Metropolitan Borough Council.
- John Cook Mather, Principal, Office of Fair Trading.
- John Alexander Matheson. For public services in Scotland and particularly as member, Scottish Industrial Development Board.
- John Campbell Maxwell, D.F.C, Chief Fire Officer, Cambridgeshire Fire and Rescue Service.
- Miss Mildred Alicia Mendez, Group Head Occupational Therapist, Merton, Sutton and Wandsworth Area Health Authority.
- Miss Peggy Theophila Metcalfe, M B.E., Foreign and Commonwealth Office.
- Robert Headley Miers, M B.E., Regional Engineer, Ministry of Agriculture, Fisheries and Food.
- Kenneth Milne, Research Executive, Radar Research Centre, Plessey Company Ltd. For services to Export.
- George Mitchell, Director, George Mitchell Choirs Ltd.
- Lieutenant-Colonel Peter Gerald Molloy, M.C., Secretary, United Kingdom Branch, Commonwealth Parliamentary Association.
- Alec Moore, Member, Scunthorpe Borough Council.
- John George Peter Morton, Senior Test Pilot, Westland Helicopters Ltd, Yeovil.
- Albert Ernest Mullin, Governor Class I, Northern Ireland Prison Service.
- Donald Arthur Munro, Director, James Longley and Company Ltd. For services to the construction industry.
- Miss Barbara Langmuir Napier. For public services and particularly as Member, Industrial Arbitration Board.
- David Shelman Nations. For services to Water Ski-ing.
- Keith Newlands, Director, Development Policy and Planning, British Steel Corporation (International) Ltd. For services to Export.
- Francis Herbert Newman, Director-General of Finance, National Coal Board.
- Commander Peter Edward Newstead, D.S.C., R.N. (Retired), Civil Affairs Officer, Sea Cadet Corps Headquarters.
- William Richard Nicholas. For services to the Magistracy in Cornwall.
- William Edward Nicholson, lately Manager, Tottenham Hotspur Football Club.
- Torquil Nicolson, Vice-Convener, Ross and Cromarty County Council.
- Captain Thomas Nisbet, D.F.C., Deputy Fight Operations Director, Overseas Division, British Airways.
- Lieutenant-Colonel Peter Smith Norwell, T.D. For services to the Highlands of Scotland Territorial Auxiliary and Volunteer Reserve Association.
- William Patrick O'Kane (Senior). For services to agriculture and food processing in Northern Ireland.
- Geoffrey Orchard, Regional Director, Cyprus, Department of the Environment.
- William Esplin Ormond, Manager, Scottish Football Team.
- Arthur Thomas Palin, Chief Chemist and Bacteriologist, Newcastle and Gateshead Water Company.
- Karl Gadenne Pamplin, Secretary, Small Engine Division, Rolls-Royce (1971) Ltd.
- Freda Elsie, Mrs. Parker, Director of Education, Family Planning Association.
- Thomas James Parker, General Secretary/Treasurer, National League of the Blind and Disabled.
- Peter Wilfrid Paskell, M.B.E., Chief Probation Officer, Nottinghamshire.
- Geoffrey Crosbie Patterson. For services Royal British Legion in Scotland.
- Alan Frederick Richards Payne. For services to the community in Stroud, Gloucestershire.
- Lester Keith Piggott, Jockey.
- Ian Stephen Porter, Chairman and Managing Director, Wilson and Longbottom Ltd, Barnsley. For services to Export.
- George Aleck Potter, Principal, Home Office.
- Miss Audrey Mary Prime, National Organising Officer for Health Staffs, National and Local Government Officers' Association.
- David Morgan Rees, Keeper, Department of Industry, National Museum of Wales.
- Thomas Idris Rees, Senior Principal Scientific Officer, Ministry of Overseas Development.
- The Reverend Ian James McClelland Reid, lately Leader, Iona Community.
- Blanche, Lady Robey. For public services particularly in Sussex.
- George Ivan Robinson, Principal Scientific Officer, National Physical Laboratory.
- Albert Rolls, lately Controller, Wales and the Marches Telecommunications Board, The Post Office.
- Clifford Beaver Rothera, Assistant Managing Director, Vantona Ltd. Chairman, Albert Hartley Ltd.
- Louis Arthur Rouse, Adviser for Immigrant and General Education, City of Bradford Metropolitan
- John Henry Joseph Sauvage, D S.O., D F.C., Managing Director, Britannia Airways Ltd.
- William Patrick Scott, T.D., Chairman, Orkney Local Employment Committee
- John Martin Service. For services to the National Economic Development Council.
- Edith Barbara, Mrs. Sheasby. For social services in Berkshire.
- Bernard Sherlock, M.B.E., Member, Northern Area Health and Social Services Board for Northern Ireland.
- Reginald William Small, Senior Principal, Royal Ordnance Factory, Chorley, Ministry of Defence.
- John Francis Austin Smyth. For services to preventive dentistry.
- Cecille Madeleine, Mrs. Stampa, Administrator for Wales, Women's Royal Voluntary Service.
- Isabella Ormiston, Mrs. Stewart, Chairman, Scottish Gas Consumers' Council.
- Francis Stone, lately Co-ordinator for Forces Work in United Kingdom, YMCA.
- Roy Oswald Stonehouse, Principal, H.M. Stationery Office.
- Charlotte Mary, Mrs. Stott, formerly Women's Editor, The Guardian.
- Major John Freville Henry Surtees, M.C., Managing Director, Garvey (London) Ltd. For services to the Government Hospitality Fund.
- Konrad Syrop, Chairman, Bush House Modernisation Working Party, British Broadcasting Corporation.
- William Arthur John Taft, Principal, Board of Customs and Excise.
- Wing Commander John Scott-Taggart, M.C. For services to radio engineering.
- John Keith Taylor, Football Referee.
- Graham Stuart Thomas, Gardens Consultant, The National Trust.
- John Haydn Thomas. For services to local government in Mid Glamorgan.
- Francis Paul Thomson, Associate Consultant, Communications and Equipment Consultants Ltd. For services to the Giro system.
- Hugh Oswald Tudor, Farmer, Gwynedd.
- Alfred Sydney Turner, County Surveyor, Somerset County Council and Chief Engineer, Somerset Sub-Unit, South Western Road Construction Unit.
- Surgeon-Captain Peter de Bee Turtle, V.R.D. For services to the Medical Officers of Schools Association.
- Frederick George Uglow, Headmaster, Montpelier Junior School, Plymouth.
- Margaret Angharad, Mrs. Valk, lately Social Work Education Adviser, Central Council for Education and Training in Social Work.
- Frederick John Vassalli, lately Managing Director, Smith Brothers (Whitehaven) Ltd.
- Donald Vaughan. For services to medicine in Norfolk.
- Raglan John Tilley Stafford-Waters, Taxation Secretary, Country Landowners' Association.
- Hugh James Bennett Watkins. For services to the community in Mid Wales.
- Andrew Watson, M B E., Deputy Director, Chamber of Shipping of the United Kingdom.
- Albert Weedall, Principal, Bournville College of Further Education, Birmingham.
- Henry Gordon Welch, Principal, Department of Employment.
- Miss Elizabeth Elaine Wilkie, Director, Council for the Education and Training of Health Visitors.
- Haydn Lewis Williams, Managing Director, Smith Kendon Ltd. For services to Export.
- William Gordon Williams, H.M. Inspector of Mechanical Engineering, Department of Energy.
- William Martin Williams, Assistant Chief Constable, Royal Ulster Constabulary.
- William Owen Williams, General Medical Practitioner, Swansea.
- Andrew Wilson, M.B.E., Director of Planning and Engineering, Renfrewshire County Council.
- David Wilson, County Organiser of Physical Education, Fife.
- David Gordon Wilson, General Medical Practitioner, Bushey, Hertfordshire.
- Peter Jardine Bonhote Wilson, Journalist (Sports-writer).
- Maxwell Charles Wolf, Assistant Managing Director, Marconi Radar Systems Ltd. For services to Export.
- James Maxwell Wood, lately Secretary, Parliamentary Committee, Co-operative Union Ltd
- Thomas Woodfield, Captain, Royal Research Ship Bransfield, Natural Environment Research Council.
- Reginald Bertie Woodhouse, M.B.E., Technical Adviser, Ministry of Defence.
- Alfred Stanley Worrall, lately Principal, Methodist College, Belfast.
- Hubert John Wright, Senior Educational Psychologist, Hampshire County Education Department.
- George Douglas Yandell, Clerk to the Nottingham City Justices

Diplomatic and Overseas List

- Peter Ralph Hendry Anderson. For services to British commercial interests and the British community in Beirut.
- James Herbert Bailey, H.M. Consul, Rome.
- Martin Jn Baptists. For public services in St. Lucia.
- Joseph Anthony Barnett, British Council Representative, Ethiopia.
- Gordon John Bell, Director, Royal Observatory, Hong Kong.
- Abraham Joseph Benatar. For services to commerce and for contributions to charities in Gibraltar.
- John Charles Preston Besford. For services to the British community in Tokyo.
- Joseph Marie Donald Bousquet. For public services in St. Lucia.
- Patrick Stuart Caldicott Bunning. For services to medical education in Nigeria and to Anglo-Nigerian relations.
- William Humphrey Caines. For services to the British community in El Salvador.
- Hector MacDonald Cameron. For services to medical education in Kenya and to Anglo-Kenyan relations.
- John Kenneth Clifford, Honorary British Representative, Kuching, Malaysia.
- Derek James Dalton, General Manager, Electricity Supply Commission of Malawi.
- William Linn Dickson, Director of Surveys and Lands, Botswana.
- John Graham Ewing. For services to British commercial interests in Japan.
- Eric Francis Foss. For services to education in The Gambia.
- Ian George Inglis Fraser, British Council Representative, Greece.
- Marguerite Iris, Mrs. Ghisalberti. For services to the British community in Milan.
- The Right Reverend Pierre Auguste Antoine Marie Guichet. For services to the community in the Gilbert and Ellice Islands Colony.
- The Reverend Canon Samuel James Harland. For services to British communities abroad as Travelling Chaplain.
- Walter Fearn Harper. For services to medical education in developing countries.
- Leonard Ernest Hicks. For services to civil aviation in Bahrain.
- Leslie Charles Hill, M.B.E. For services to telecommunications in Bahrain.
- Harold Holdsworth. For services to university libraries in developing countries.
- Eric Horatio Hurst. For services to medical administration in Kenya and to Anglo-Kenyan relations.
- Leslie Walter James, M.B.E., First Secretary, British High Commission, New Delhi.
- Alfred William Johnson. For services to ornithology in Chile.
- Vivian Jan Kennard, Auditor General, The Gambia.
- Nathaniel Myer Kofsky. For services to music in Kenya and to Anglo-Kenyan relations.
- William Bolivar Kup, Honorary British Consul, Belem, Brazil.
- Harry Percy Lambe. For services to British commercial interests in Austria.
- Charles Harold Alistair Lane, Director of Plant and Vehicles, Ministry of Works and Supplies, Malawi.
- Miss Lilian Godfreda Donnithorne-Lutter, M.B.E. For services to education in Jaipur, India.
- Gordon Alexander McCarthy. For services to British commercial interests in Ecuador.
- John Mackenzie. For services to industry and the community in Swaziland.
- John Downes Markland. For services to British commercial interests and the British community in Greece.
- Andrew Martin. For services to British commercial interests in Belgium.
- Thomas Robert Milburn. For services to the development of university education in Uganda.
- Donald Clifford Miller. For services to education in Nigeria and to Anglo-Nigerian relations.
- John Roy Mackay Miller. For services to medicine in Kenya and to Anglo-Kenyan relations.
- Herbert Joseph Moorhead. For services to British commercial interests in Argentina.
- Byron Bertram Nelson. For services to British commercial interests and the British community in Iran.
- Eli Ernest Edward Nielsen. For services to civil aviation in the British Solomon Islands Protectorate.
- Ralph Telford O'Neal. For services to the community in the British Virgin Islands.
- James Myles Oswald, C.P.M. For services to Anglo-Kenyan relations.
- John Halliwell Owen, First Secretary, British High Commission, Dhaka.
- Hugh Kenneth Howard Oxley. For services to British commercial interests in Belgium.
- George David Park. For services to the British community in Paris.
- Gordon Vasey Peacock. For services to the British community in Boston.
- Leonard Pickles, H.M. Consul-General, Tokyo.
- Reginald Conway Pinchbeck. For services to the British community in Lima and to Anglo-Peruvian relations.
- Thomas Edward Fisher Pooley, lately First Secretary, British High Commission, Nairobi.
- Stanley Alfred Priddle, First Secretary (Labour), British High Commission, Lagos.
- Frank Evelyn Rainbow, Commissioner of, Inland Revenue, Hong Kong.
- Thomas Rattray. For services to the British community in Madras and Southern India.
- David Drummond Reid, lately Acting British Council Representative, Pakistan.
- Miss Coralie Rendle-Short. For services to medical education in developing countries.
- Farnham Allen Rees St. John. For services to medicine in Tangier and to Anglo-Moroccan relations.
- Bryan Muir Sanderson. For services to British commercial interests and the British community in Madrid.
- Frank Leslie Savage. For services to British commercial interests in New York.
- Miss Sheila Mary Sersale. For services to the community in Hong Kong.
- John Desmond Shepherd. For services to British cultural interests and to Anglo-Mexican relations.
- Robert James Shepherd, T.D., Commissioner of Taxes, Ministry of Finance, Malawi.
- Arthur Richard Spurgin, M.B.E. For services to the British community in Zaire.
- David Brian Stronach. For services to British cultural interests and to Anglo-Iranian relations.
- Basil Frank Sutton, D.F.C., Director of Civil Aviation, Seychelles.
- Edwin Twyman. For services to the British community in Kyrenia, Cyprus.
- Sam Waring. For services to British commercial interests and the British community in Alicante, Spain.
- The Reverend Ian Charles Weathrall. For welfares services to the community in New Delhi.
- Robert James Wedderburn. For services to forestry and wildlife conservation in Nigeria.
- John Barnard Weymes, lately H.M. Consul, Guatemala City.
- Frederick Theophilus Williams. For public services in St. Kitts/Nevis/Anguilla.
- Godfrey John Williams, M.C. For services to technical education in developing countries.
- John Gibson Williams. For services to British commercial interests in Ibadan and to Anglo-Nigerian relations.
- Peter Gordon Williams. For services to the community and to commerce in Hong Kong.
- Wong Toong-yuen. For services to commerce in Hong Kong.
- Woo Hsiao-tsing. For services to industry and to charities in Hong-Kong.
- Robert Buchanan Wood, M.B.E. For services to British commercial interests in Brazil.
- Edward Percival Yorke, M.B E., Chief Education Officer, Belize.

==== Member of the Order of the British Empire (MBE) ====
===== Military Division =====
Army

- Captain (Queen's Gurkha Officer) Manbahadur Ale (472080), 2nd King Edward VII's Own Gurkha Rifles (The Sirmoor Rifles) (now Retired).
- Major Albert James Ambler (477189), Royal Army Pay Corps.
- Major (Quartermaster) Elaine Anton (474707), Women's Royal Army Corps.
- Major Alexander Roy Ball (384614), Royal Regiment of Artillery (Now Retired).
- Major Edwin Horace Alexander Beckett (454977), The Prince of Wales's Own Regiment of Yorkshire.
- 22782526 Warrant Officer Class 1 Stanley Peter Birch, Queen's Own Highlanders (Seaforth and Camerons).
- Captain (Technical Instructor-in-Gunnery) Kenneth Ronald Border(482391), Royal Regiment of Artillery.
- Captain (Acting Major) Patrick Murray Ranger Brook (469213), The Blues and Royals (Royal Horse Guards and 1st Dragoons).
- Captain (Local Major) Charles Stewart William Brown (343885), The Light Infantry and Mercian Volunteers, Territorial and Army Volunteer Reserve.
- Major William Bowman Scott Buchanan (468792), Royal Corps of Signals, Territorial and Army Volunteer Reserve (Now R.A.R.O.).
- Major Peter Morden Benedict Carthew (411911), The Black Watch (Royal Highland Regiment).
- Major (Quartermaster) George Connolly (476190), The Royal Regiment of Fusiliers.
- Captain (Now Major) (Quartermaster) Frank Crabtree (478963), Royal Corps of Transport.
- 22214049 Warrant Officer Class 2 Albert Crisp, The Green Howards (Alexandra, Princess of Wales's Own Yorkshire Regiment).
- 23674048 Warrant Officer Class 2 Brian Daley, Army Physical Training Corps.
- Major Roger William Martin Eagle (439995), Corps of Royal Engineers.
- Major Bryan Fleming (461424), Corps of Royal Electrical and Mechanical Engineers.
- Major Peter Norman Gill (431466), Royal Regiment of Artillery.
- Major (Quartermaster) James Gillespie (475056), Corps of Royal Engineers.
- Major Robin Digby Grist (467564), The Gloucestershire Regiment.
- Major David George Hammett (459265), Royal Corps of Transport.
- Captain Gael Kathleen Hammond (486886), Women's Royal Army Corps.
- Major (Now Lieutenant-Colonel) Anthony John Harrison (411617), Royal Regiment of Artillery.
- Captain (Acting Major) (Quartermaster) Cyril Charles Hastings (482000), Corps of Royal Engineers.
- Major (Acting) James Buchan Henderson (404822), Army Cadet Force.
- Major Kenneth Thomas Horseman, B.E.M. (482986), Royal Army Ordnance Corps.
- Captain (Now Major) (Quartermaster) Harold Thomas Hutchinson (481216), The Royal Highland Fusiliers (Princess Margaret's Own Glasgow and Ayrshire Regiment).
- Major (TIG) Kenneth Martin Jackson (472703), Royal Regiment of Artillery.
- Major Alastair Ian Kennedy (459280), Intelligence Corps.
- Captain (Non Dental) George Renwick Kirsopp (489466), Royal Army Dental Corps.
- Major Bernard James Lambert (360061), The Staffordshire Regiment (The Prince of Wales).
- 19054569 Warrant Officer Class 2 (Acting Warrant Officer Class 1) Ronald Steward Lamond, Corps of Royal Electrical and Mechanical Engineers.
- Major (Quartermaster) Charles Donald Langdon (475710), The Parachute Regiment.
- Major (Now Lieutenant-Colonel) John Marchant-Smith (424395), The Green Howards (Alexandra, Princess of Wales's Own Yorkshire Regiment).
- 23521271 Warrant Officer Class 2 (Acting Warrant Officer Class 1) Julian Barrie McGill, Royal Army Ordnance Corps.
- 22782037 Warrant Officer Class 1 (Now Lieutenant) William James McLucas, The Queen's Royal Irish Hussars.
- Major Ronald Iain Radford (373137), Corps of Royal Engineers.
- Major John Cecil Patrick Shannon (469584), Royal Army Medical Corps, Territorial and Army Volunteer Reserve.
- 22147232 Warrant Officer Class 2 Frederick Gordon Sheppard, Wessex Regiment (Rifle Volunteers), Territorial and Army Volunteer Reserve.
- Major (Now Lieutenant-Colonel) Colin Terry Shortis (426767), The Devonshire and Dorset Regiment.
- 2287163 Warrant Officer Class 1 (Now Lieutenant) James Edward Taylor, Royal Army Pay Corps.
- 23593848 Warrant Officer Class 1 (Now Lieutenant) Adrian Frank Winterton, Intelligence Corps.

===== Civil Division =====
- Edward James Abbott, Executive Officer, Ministry of Defence.
- William Ernest Abbott, lately Assistant Director of Housing (Finance), Greater London Council.
- Gwen, Mrs. Abraham. For services to the community in the Abertillery area.
- Bernard Paul Fornaro Adams, Librarian, Central Library, British Council.
- Leonard Adams, Chief Superintendent, Metropolitan Police.
- Sylvester Agnew, Professional and Technology Officer, Grade I, Department of the Environment.
- Maurice John Allen, Higher Scientific Officer, Rothampsted Experimental Station, Agricultural Research Council.
- John Edwin Ammonds, Executive Producer, Light Entertainment, Television, British Broadcasting Corporation.
- Miss Ruth Dugmore Anderson, Scientific Officer, Animal Diseases Research Association, Edinburgh.
- Charles James Andrews, Base Maintenance Manager (Saudi Arabia), British Aircraft Corporation Ltd.
- Hector Ardern, lately Headmaster, Sedbury Park School, Chepstow.
- Ernest Armatage, Chairman, League of Friends of Tynemouth Hospital.
- Jean Brown, Mrs. Armet, Provost of Inverkeithing, Fife.
- Ellis Ashton, Studio Hand, London Weekend Television.
- John Lombe Haddon Askwith, Chairman of Trustees, Vaughan Agricultural Institute, Northern Ireland.
- Sydney Astin, Chairman, London Borough of Merton Savings Committee
- Captain James Mark Atherton, Marine Superintendent, Middle Mersey Effluent Treatment Unit, North West Water Authority.
- Alfred Arthur Barber, lately Export Accountant and Shipping Manager, Ransomes Sims and Jefferies Ltd. For services to Export.
- Miss Frances Dorothy Barber, lately Senior Executive Officer, Department of the Environment
- Anthony Norman Edward Bates, Helicopter Instructor, Bristows Helicopters Ltd.
- James Beresford Batty, Districts Operations Manager, Greater Manchester Passenger Transport Executive.
- Charles John Beaufort, Executive Chef, Cafe Royal, Trust Houses Forte Ltd
- Miss Dorothy Beavan, Head Teacher, Princess Road Junior School, Moss Side, Manchester.
- George Kenneth Beedle, Member, Translators' Panel, Lending Division, British Library.
- Emily Sylvia, Mrs. Bell, Head of Consumer Affairs Section, Readers' Service, I.P.C. Newspaper Division.
- William Richard Berkeley, Assistant Inspector of Fire Services.
- Maurice Berry. For services to the Institute of Work Study Practitioners.
- Miss Cicely Pilon Bishop, Head of Statistics Department, Women's Royal Voluntary Service.
- William Edwin Bishop, lately Chief Superintendent, Northumbria Police.
- John George Blythe, Managing Director, J. G. Blythe and Company Ltd.
- Gerald Francis James Boarer, Information Officer, Publicity Division, Postal Headquarters, Post Office.
- James Bond, Regional Organiser, Wales, Royal Society for the Prevention of Accidents.
- Richard Lawrence Bongard, Senior Executive Officer, Department for National Savings.
- Robert Booth, Chief Superintendent, West Mercia Constabulary.
- Alfred Harry Boughton, Principal Careers Officer, Rotherham Metropolitan District.
- Miss Minnie Nyren Brabrook. For services to the community in Havant.
- Minnie Doreen, Mrs. Brisland, Headmistress, Eastergate Church of England Primary School, West Sussex
- Francis John Brooks, Manager, Military Contracts, Electronics and Industrial Operations, Electrical and Musical Industries. For services to Export.
- James Gordon Brown, Faculty Officer and Superintendent, Faculty of Advocates.
- Robert Harper Brown, General Manager, Belfast Europa Hotel
- William Wolton Brown, Senior Scientific Officer, Institute for Marine Environmental Research, Natural Environment Research Council.
- William Edward Brunskill, Chief Superintendent, Midlands Division, Birmingham, British Transport Police
- Miss Ethel Harold Bullock, Secretary, Gosforth Sea Cadet Corps Unit.
- Russell Brian Burgess, Director of Music, Wandsworth School.
- Daniel Frederick Burlingham. F o r services t o the Magistracy in King's Lynn.
- Miss Norah Elise Burnham, Regional Collector of Taxes, Board of Inland Revenue.
- Miss Joan Mary Buttfield, Horticulture Officer Grade III, Ministry of Agriculture, Fisheries and Food
- Charles Cordner Caldwell, Principal, Cairnmartin Secondary School, Belfast.
- Ian Robert Callaghan, Footballer, Liverpool Football Club.
- John Tom Cantlay, Farmer, Oxfordshire. For services to agriculture.
- Miss Annie Carr, Nursing Officer, Staff Occupational Health, Ingham Infirmary, South Shields.
- Ida, Mrs. Cass, Member, Wyre Borough Council.
- Robin Francis Cavendish. For services to disabled people.
- Victor Ceserani, Head, School of Hotel Keeping and Catering, Ealing Technical College.
- Miss Doreen Ivy Inman Chalk, Higher Executive Officer, Welsh Office.
- Leslie Challands, Senior Executive Officer, Department of Health and Social Security.
- George Henry Chapman, Senior Executive Officer, Department of Health and Social Security.
- Leonard William Chapman, Director-General, The Institute of Legal Executives.
- Robert Frederick Chestney, Reserve Warden, Scolt Head National Nature Reserve.
- Mervyn Alexander Cinnamond, formerly Station Maintenance Manager, Dubai, Overseas Division, British Airways.
- Eric Clements, Chief Estimator, Barrow Shipbuilding Works, Vickers Ltd. For services to Export.
- Harry Oswald Clements, Manager, Proving and Testing, Armament Division, Vickers Ltd.
- Edna Amy Lewis, Mrs. Clifton, lately General Secretary, Mental After Care Association.
- Stephen John Cody, lately Distribution Manager, J. Sainsbury Ltd.
- Miss Joan Vernon Connew, Calligrapher.
- Ena, Mrs. Constable. For services to the community in Barnet.
- Helena Metcalfe Rae, Mrs. Cooper, District Organiser, Leicester, Women's Royal Voluntary Service.
- Norman Frank Cooper, Secretary, Hosiery and Allied Trades Research Association.
- Miss Foy Felicia Quiller-Couch. For services to the National Trust in Cornwall.
- Miss Kathleen Florence Craske. lately Executive Officer, Ministry of Defence.
- Robert Crichton, School Attendance Liaison Officer, Glasgow Corporation.
- William Frank Croft, Industrial Relations Officer, British Sidac Ltd.
- Gerald Gordon Crowson, Member, South Kesteven District Council.
- Harry Mervyn Cundall, lately Administrative Assistant and Instructor, North of England Territorial Auxiliary and Volunteer Reserve Association.
- Hector James Dandie, Director, Scottish Association of Master Bakers.
- Leslie Charles Davey, Administrative Assistant, North Norfolk Division, Norfolk County Council.
- Dennis Harold Davies, Senior Assistant, Financial Services, Nottinghamshire County Council.
- Miss Beryl Dean (Mrs. Phillips). For services to ecclesiastical embroidery.
- Miss Guendolen Spens Dearden, lately Branch Secretary, Isle of Man Central Council Branch, British Red Cross Society.
- James Deering, Construction Works Manager, R. M. Douglas (Contractors) Ltd.
- Amy Winifred, Mrs. Dell. For services to the community in Brentwood, Essex.
- Miss Marjorie Roma Dexter, Chairman, Leicester District Committee, National Union of Hosiery and Knitwear Workers
- Miss Barabara Joan Dix, lately Assistant Diocesan Secretary, Diocese of Norwich.
- Miss Elsie Dixon, lately Principal Probation Officer, Humberside.
- Robert Craig Dixon, Chairman, Wandsworth Committee of Friendship for Oversceas Students.
- Samuel Donnelly, Superintendent, Royal Ulster Constabulary.
- William Arthur John Dorrington, Executive Officer, Metropolitan Police Office.
- Charles Douglas, Member, Advisory Committee on Scotland's Travelling People.
- Miss Christine Eleanor Jose Duke, Head of Services Welfare Department, Women's Royal Voluntary Service.
- Richmond Joseph Dyoss, Office Personnel Manager, Bromford Works, British Steel Corporation.
- Frank Edward Eborall, Chief Metallurgist, Smith-Clayton Forge Ltd.
- Miss Mildred Joan Eden, Senior Executive Officer, Forestry Commission.
- Mary Augusta, Mrs. Edwards. For services to the community in Gwynedd.
- Thomas Brown Edwards, Assistant Division Officer, Ordnance Survey.
- William Balfour Ross Elder, Farm Manager and Managing Director, Mid Glen Farms Ltd., Renfrewshire.
- Joseph Elliott, Sales Promotion Manager, Thermal Syndicate Ltd. For services to Export.
- Thomas Albert Essam, Senior Executive Officer, Board of Customs and Excise.
- Frederick Faerber, Managing Director, S F. Mokes and Company Ltd., Walsall.
- Robert Hall Fell, Managing Director, W. A. Fell Ltd. For services to Export.
- Terence Ivor Fieldson, Joint Chief Reporter, Hastings and St. Leonards Observer
- Violet Ruth, Mrs. Flannigan, Flight Planning Officer, Flight Operations Unit, Overseas Division, British Airways.
- Miss Olive Winifred Foale, Personal Secretary, Ministry of Defence.
- Mona Jessie, Mrs. Forsdick, Borough Organiser, London Borough of Merton, Women's Royal Voluntary Service.
- Miss Eileen Fowler (Eileen Philippa Rose, Mrs. Carson). For services to Physical Education,
- Iolene Constance, Mrs. Foxley, Chairman, Management Committee, Victoria League Hostel, Birmingham.
- Hugh Montefiore Freeman, Assistant Youth Officer, London Borough of Brent.
- Thomas Hubert Freeman, lately Legal Executive, Crawley Commission for the New Towns.
- Verena Audrey, Mrs. Galton, lately Matron, St. Christopher's Hospice, Sydenham, London.
- Miss Olga Patricia Garner, Senior Designer, J. R. Gaunt (London) Ltd., Birmingham.
- Edith Rosalyn, Mrs. Gaussen, Organising Secretary, Runcorn and District Citizens' Advice Bureau
- John Thomas Edward Gay, lately Manager, Pension Funds Investment, British Gas Corporation.
- Sidney Godfrey. For services to the Royal Naval Association.
- Frank Albert Goodspeed, Senior Executive Officer, Board of Customs and Excise.
- Patrick Abbott Gouldsbury, Secretary, Gamekeepers' Association.
- Ronald Greatrix, Senior Resident Engineer, Lancashire Sub-Unit, North Western Road Construction Unit.
- Allan Greig, lately Director, Arable, Milk and Animal Health Division, National Farmers' Union
- Arthur Thomas Griffiths, Director, Griff's Ltd., Booksellers, London.
- Charles Clifton Gullan, Higher Executive Officer, Department of Employment
- Miss Anthea Trail Guthrie, Foreign and Commonwealth Office.
- Miss Elizabeth Mary Hale, lately Health Visitor, East Sussex County Council.
- Joseph William Hall, Welfare Officer, Egham Industrial Rehabilitation Unit, Department of Employment.
- John Marsden Hander. For services to the Air Training Corps in Liverpool.
- Miss Joan Rose Harrison, Private Secretary to Members of Parliament.
- Walter Cunliffe Hart, General Adviser (Music) Leeds Metropolitan District.
- Horace Percival William Harvey, Warden, North Kensington Community Centre.
- Stanley Wilfred Hatton, Councillor, Forest of Dean District Council.
- Miss Winifred Blanche Haughey, Higher Executive Officer, Department of Health and Social Security.
- Miss Mabel Raymonde-Hawkins, Organiser, Raystede Centre for Animal Welfare Ltd., Ringmer.
- James Haworth. For services to the community in Fleetwood.
- Max David Haycocks, Professional and Technology Officer Grade II, Cyprus, Department of the Environment.
- The Right Honourable Elizabeth Anne, Lady Hayter. For services to the School Care Service in Hammersmith.
- Alastair Alan Henry, Senior Executive Officer, Department of Health and Social Security.
- Miss Clara Elizabeth Hepworth, lately Member of Dewsbury, Batley and Mirfield Hospital Management Committee.
- Abraham Hershon. For services to ex-servicemen and disabled people in Southport.
- Arthur William George Hewes, District Commercial Engineer, Oxford District, Southern Electricity Board.
- Raymond John Hicks, General Manager and Local Director, Compact Orbital Gear Works, Rhayader, Vickers Ltd.
- Wilfred Maitland Hicks, Foreign and Commonwealth Office.
- Derrick Frederick Charles Hill, Chief Engineer, National Carriers Ltd.
- Ernest Arthur Hill, Executive Officer, Department of Health and Social Security.
- William Lawrence Hill. For services to the Royal British Legion.
- Frank Hilson, Director of Housing, Bury Metropolitan Borough Council.
- Peter Anthony Hilton, Chairman and Managing Director, Hilton Cowie and Company Ltd. For services to Export.
- Walter Maurice Hiscock, Professional and Technology Officer Grade 1, Ministry of Defence.
- Miss Ella Minnie Hobbs, Sister-in-Charge, Church Army Club, Menden, British Army of the Rhine.
- Stanley Thomas Holliwell, Supplies Manager, Consumer Electronics Division, Mullard Ltd.
- Elizabeth Mary, Mrs. Hope. For services to the Fleetwood Savings Committee.
- Edwin Hopkins. For services to athletics in Wales.
- John Hopkinson. For services to the community in the Preston area.
- John Sidney Hoskin, Senior Executive Officer, Ministry of Defence.
- Bernard Whitfield Houghton, Headmaster, Little Bytham County Primary School, Lincolnshire.
- George Houston, Chief Inspector, Royal Ulster Constabulary.
- Miss Constance Howard (Constance Mildred, Mrs. Parker), Principal Lecturer, Fine Art Department, Goldsmiths College, University of London.
- Fay Beryl, Mrs. Howard, Executive Officer, Royal Air Forces Association.
- Stephen Howson, lately Joint Secretary, Plymouth Guild of Social Service and Virginia House Settlement.
- Talwrvai Humphreys, Chairman, Montgomery Savings Committee.
- Andrew Paul Macaulay Hunter, Secretary, Falkirk District, Scottish Community Drama Association.
- John Hunter, Depot Superintendent, Church, British Waterways Board.
- Morag, Mrs. Hutton, Chief Nursing Officer, St. Margaret's Home, Dundee.
- Frank Haden. For services to the Scout Association in Birmingham.
- Tom Herbert Iddison, Environmental Health Officer, Dartford District Council.
- Miss Thirza Mary Brady Jackson. For services to the Girl Guides Association.
- Gilbert Scott Jameson, Senior Inspector of Accidents (Engineering), Department of Trade.
- Miss Jennifer Rose Aylmer Jones, Research Assistant, Theatre Museum, Victoria and Albert Museum.
- John Owen Peregrine Jones, Headmaster, Longlevens School, Gloucester.
- Mary Elizabeth, Mrs. Jones. For services to the community in the Orpington area.
- Ronald Bell-Jones. Chairman, Barnet Disablement Advisory Committee.
- Robert Thomas Jordan, Branch Manager, Northern Ireland, Esso Petroleum Company Ltd.
- William David Joslin, General Administrator, Cuckfield and Crawley Health District, West Sussex Area Health Authority.
- John Wilson Jowsey, Executive Officer, Department of Health and Social Security.
- Stanley Joseph Kernaghan, Superintendent, Royal Ulster Constabulary.
- Harvey Kershaw. For services to the study and preservation of the Lancashire dialect.
- Edgar Stanley Kessell. For services to music in Cornwall.
- Cyril Stanley Ketcher, Superintending Clerk, Vote Office, House of Commons.
- Rina McCall, Mrs. Keys. For services to the elderly in Londonderry.
- John Roy Killeen, Marketing Liaison Manager, Racal-Mobilcal Ltd., Reading.
- Leslie George Kime, formerly Senior Executive Officer, Ministry of Defence.
- Miss Brownlee Jean Kirkpatrick, Librarian, Royal Anthropological Institute of Great Britain and Ireland.
- Joan, Mrs. Knowles, Chairman and President, Advisory Body of the Chronically Disabled, County of Cleveland.
- Patricia, Mrs. Kuyvenhoven. For services to the Bath Searchlight Tattoo.
- Denis Martin Lacy, Deputy Director, Cocoa, Chocolate and Confectionery Alliance.
- Cyril Max Lamont, Senior Scientific Officer, Home Office.
- James Lane, Director, Lilleshall Hall National Sports Centre.
- Thomas Ralph Lascelles, Chairman, Reading Supplementary Benefit Appeal Tribunal.
- Joan Helen, Mrs. Leach, Chief Supervisor of Duplicator Operators, Central Office of Information.
- Miss Constance Elise Leary, Higher Executive Officer, Department of Energy.
- Myra, Mrs. Lees. For services to the community in Lanarkshire.
- William Lemmon, Chief Ambulance Officer, Ayrshire, Dumfries and Galloway.
- Kenneth Ernest Lewis, Assistant Director (Finance) and Secretary, Cotton, Silk and Man-Made Fibres Research Association.
- Miss Margery Ling, Matron, The National Hospital for Nervous Diseases, London.
- Michael Hilton Joseph Lord, Works Manager (Development), Doncasters Monk Bridge Ltd, Leeds.
- Miss Winifred Florence Lovell, Superintendent of Typists, Church Commissioners for England.
- Lieutenant-Colonel Robert Hugh Arthur Lucas, lately President, Essex Association of Parish Councils and Member of the former Lexden and Winstree Rural District Council.
- Richard James McColgan. For services to athletics in Northern Ireland.
- Thomas Donald Robertson McGhie, Master of Works, Yarrow Shipbuilders Ltd.
- Archibald Robin McInnes, T.D., Financial Accountant, General Steels Division, British Steel Corporation.
- Miss Ellen Elizabeth McIvor, Personal Secretary, London Transport Executive.
- John Ernest McKendrick, lately Principal Teacher of Music, Hillhead High School, Glasgow.
- Isobel Mary, Mrs. McLellan, Member, Angus County Council.
- Albert McMillan, Training Officer, Tysons (Contractors) Ltd., Liverpool.
- Miss Jean Cameron Macrae, Higher Executive Officer, Ministry of Defence.
- George Mansell, Senior Executive Officer, Department of Education and Science.
- Ralph Marsh, M.C., Treasurer, Special Trustees, St. George's Hospital, London.
- William Marshall, Agriculturist and Broadcaster. For services to agriculture.
- Kathleen Rose, Mrs. Masters, Assistant Secretary, Northern Ireland Branch, The Royal Air Force Benevolent Fund.
- Arthur Thomas Mawdsley, Head, Installation, Stores and Motor Transport Efficiency Group, North Western Telecommunications Board, Post Office.
- Kenneth Maynard, Group Commandant, No. 22 Group, Royal Observer Corps.
- Derryck Peter Mercy, Higher Executive Officer, H.M. Treasury.
- George Leslie Merifield. For services to the Surrey Association of Boys' Clubs.
- Leonard Edward Middleton, General Manager, BRE-Metro Ltd. For services to Export.
- Harvey James Mitchell Miles. For services to the community in Epsom.
- Waler Desmond Miles, Chief Engineer, Welland and Deepings Internal Drainage Board.
- James Millar, B.E.M., Chief Superintendent, Royal Ulster Constabulary.
- William Edward Mills, lately Deputy Clerk to the Justices, Sedgemoor Division of Somerset.
- Miss Dorothy Jean Montgomery, Executive Officer, Department of Industry.
- Miss Ann Elizabeth Moore. For services to Show Jumping.
- Edward John Moore, lately Clerk, Greater London (North Western) Valuation Panel.
- Miss Margaret Jane Moore. For services to the community in Canvey Island.
- Walter Morrod, Senior Divisional Officer, Salop Fire Brigade.
- John Muldoon, Chief Superintendent, Norfolk Constabulary.
- Miss Cicely Hayes Newington, lately Higher Executive Officer, Ministry of Defence.
- Patrick Desmond Newman, Managing Director, Transworld Publishers Ltd. For services to Export.
- David Nicholson, Divisional Head, Range and Flight Trials (Guided Weapons), British Aircraft Corporation Ltd.
- Charles George O'Connor, Secretary, John Groom's Association for the Disabled.
- Thomas Joseph O'Dea, Editor, "Red Tape", Journal of the Civil and Public Services Association.
- Vera Ruth, Mrs. Openshaw, Higher Executive Officer, Department of Health and Social Security.
- Gordon Everett Parramore, Engineering Craft Training Manager, Billingham Agricultural Division, Imperial Chemical Industries Ltd.
- Alan Peter Pascoe. For services to Athletics.
- George Errington Passant, General Manager, West Midland Trustee Savings Bank.
- Miss Nora Mary Paterson, Bank Clerk, National Westminster Bank Ltd
- Philip King Patrick, D.F.C., General Manager, Refuse Disposal, Public Health Engineering Department, Greater London Council.
- Miss Monica Mary Pearce, Planning and Commissioning Nurse, St. Mary's Hospice, Birmingham.
- Philip Henry Pearce, Regional Engineer (Midlands), Inspection Division, Crown Agents for Oversea Governments and Administrations.
- Mary Agnes Maclean, Mrs Pearson, Member, Streets and Social Organisations Advisory Committee, National Savings Committee for Scotland.
- Donald Alfred Perfect, Higher Scientific Officer, Royal Aircraft Establishment, Farnborough, Ministry of Defence.
- Arthur Frederick Stanley Perks, Chief Fire Officer, Isle of Wight Fire Brigade.
- Katharine Margaret Dyson, Mrs. Perrins, lately Chairman, League of Friends of Worcester Royal Infirmary.
- Stanley Francis John Robert Perry, lately Secretary, High Court Journalists' Association.
- Captain George Herbert Phillips, Commodore Master, Palm Line Ltd.
- Miss Kathleen Mary Pinson, lately Clerk, Walsall Savings Committee.
- Miss Florence Ida Loweth Piper, lately District Nurse, Midwife and Health Visitor, Cornwall County Council.
- Margaret, Mrs. Pitcher, B.E.M. For, services to the elderly in Maidenhead.
- John Platt, Secretary, British Textile Employers' Association, Manchester.
- Beatrice Louise, Mrs Powell, Audio Typist, Department of the Environment.
- Charles Leonard Powell, Senior Executive Officer, Royal Mint.
- Keith Vernon Powell, Senior Executive Officer, Department of Employment.
- Annie Elizabeth, Mrs. Prendergast, lately Member, North East London Executive Council.
- Walter Kenneth Preston, Member, Stroud District Council, Gloucestershire.
- John Pringle, B.E.M., Area Superintendent, North Africa Area, Commonwealth War Graves Commission.
- Ceclia Joyce, Mrs. Purcell, Assistant Secretary, British-American Parliamentary Group.
- Frederick MacDonald Purvis, Secretary and Hous- ing Manager, Victory Housing Society Ltd.
- Arthur John Pye, lately Senior Nursing Officer, Little Plumstead Hospital, Norfolk.
- Cecil Herbert Rapport, Member, Council of the Priory for Wales, St. John Ambulance Association and Brigade.
- Jane, Mrs. Rawlings, Chairman, South Western Region Area Nurse Training Committee
- Bertram Joseph Reid, lately Secretary, Suffolk Community Council.
- John Reid, Member, Ayrshire River Purification Board.
- David Richards, Senior Executive Officer, Lord Chancellor's Department.
- Gladys Faith, Mrs. Rigby. For services to multiple sclerosis patients.
- George Edwin Riley, Executive Officer, Board of Inland Revenue.
- William Robb, Deputy Principal, Department of Housing, Local Government and Planning, Northern Ireland.
- Minnie Eliza, Mrs. Robinson. For services to the community in Cleveland.
- William Rogers, Editor, Deeside Advertiser.
- George William Rose, Inspector (Higher Grade), Board of Inland Revenue.
- Kenneth George Percy Rose, Production Manager, Electronics, Airtech Ltd. For services to Export.
- Miss Eileen Grace Sands, Headmistress, Mountford Manor Infants School, Swindon.
- Miss Hilda Barbara Saunders, Nursing Officer, St. Bartholomew's Hospital, London
- Walter Joseph Shewry, Secretary, Post Office Rifles Association.
- Alfred Joseph Frank Shiner, Headmaster, Castle Hill Junior School, Ipswich.
- Ellen Mary, Mrs. Shortt, Catering Manager III, Civil Service Department,
- Robert Shearer Sim, Chief Superintendent and Deputy Chief Constable, Berwick, Roxburgh and Selkirk Constabulary.
- Eric Goodwin Simmonds. For services to the Bristol and West of England Engineering Manufacturers' Association Ltd.
- Miss Annie Fyfe Young Smart, lately Principal Nursing Officer, Murray Royal and Murthly Hospitals, Perthshire.
- Gordon Stevenson Smith, Executive Officer, Department for National Savings.
- Kenneth Anthony Smith, Assistant Technical Adviser, Ministry of Defence.
- Lawrence Arthur Smith, Chief Financial Executive, Cluttons. For services to the Crown Estates Commission.
- William Smith, Chairman, Accrington and District Local Employment Committee.
- Miss Margaret Megarry Smyth. For services to the Girl Guides Association in Ulster.
- Eileen May, Mrs. Spence. For welfare services with the Women's Royal Voluntary Service in Germany and Northern Ireland.
- John Clifford Spencer, lately Executive Officer, Department of Health and Social Security.
- Leslie Frank Stamp, lately Senior Executive Officer, Department of Health and Social Security.
- Walter Runciman Stephens, Founder Chairman, Thor Hammer Company Ltd., Solihull. For services to Export.
- Philip Stinton, D.L., Member, St. Andrew's Ambulance Corps, Glasgow.
- Alan Barlow Street, Manager (Northern Ireland), Shipping and International Services Division, British Railways Board.
- Willie Sykes, Deputy Manager, Frickley Colliery, Doncaster Area, National Coal Board.
- Miss Lilias Johnston Tait, Librarian, City and Western General Hospitals, Edinburgh.
- Jane, Mrs. Tarlo, Regional Emergency Organiser, North Western Region, Women's Royal Voluntary Service.
- Bessie, Mrs. Taylor, Vice-Chairman, Castleford Local Savings Committee.
- Francis Maurice Telling, Professional and Technology Officer I, Rutherford Laboratory, Science Research Council.
- Geoffrey Thirlkell, Professional and Technology Officer Grade II, Ministry of Defence.
- David Leslie Thomas, Senior Collector of Taxes, Board of Inland Revenue.
- Dorothy Edith, Mrs. Thomas, Chairman, Ipswich National Savings Street Groups Committee.
- Onfel Thomas Headmaster, Builth Wells County Primary School.
- James Douglas Thompson, Chairman, Yeovil, Crewkerne and District Local Savings Committee.
- George Stewart Thomson, District Clerk and Treasurer, Eastwood (First) District Council, Renfrew.
- Henry Thorneloe, lately Senior Export Technical Salesman, H. W. Ward and Company Ltd. For services to Export.
- James Menzies Thornton, Managing Director, Vesuvius Crucible Company Ltd. For services to Export.
- Norman Henry Thrift, Foreign and Commonwealth Office.
- Francis John Trigger, Clerical Officer, Cabinet Office.
- Alexander Edward Turnbull, lately General Medical Practitioner, Kelso, Roxburghshire.
- James Urwin, Manager, Sunderland Factory, Remploy Ltd.
- Eric Warburton, Senior Executive Officer, H.M. Stationery Office.
- Jack Warden, lately Gardens Executive, Zoological Society of London.
- Herbert John Warren, Executive Officer, Ministry of Defence.
- Michael John Webber, Chief Warning Officer, Colchester Group, United Kingdom Warning and Monitoring Organisation.
- John Gordon Vincent Webster, lately Group Secretary, Cranage Hall Hospital Management Committee, Cheshire.
- Robert West, Deputy Manager, Isotope Production Unit, The Radiochemical Centre Ltd.
- William Whewell. For services to the conserva- tion of Shire horses.
- Miss Kathleen Mary White, Higher Executive Officer, Department of Employment.
- Mary Joyce, Mrs. White, Assistant, Television News Intake Planning, British Broadcasting Corporation.
- Irene, Mrs. Whittaker, Head Teacher, King's Farm Junior School, Gravesend.
- Stanley Wilde, Principal Architect, City of Birmingham District Council.
- Alma, Mrs. Williams, Consumer Education Adviser, Consumers' Association.
- Miss Dilys Gwawrwen Williams, Headmistress, Ladymoor Special School, Wolverhampton.
- John Lewis Williams, lately Technical Officer (Engineering), Council for Small Industries in Rural Areas.
- Edna, Mrs. Williamson, Chairman, North-East Regional Council, National Association for the Care and Resettlement of Offenders.
- Charles Peter Wilson, Traffic Commissioner, Yorkshire Traffic Area.
- Ernest John Wilson, Senior Enrolled Nurse, Royal Hospital and Home for Incurables, Putney.
- William Mitchell Wilson, Provost of Linlithgow, West Lothian.
- Antony Curtis Wolffe, Architect, Gatehouse-of- Fleet and Dumfries.
- George William Woodhill, Registrar, Head- quarters, St. John Ambulance Association and Brigade.
- George Richard Woollams, Secretary, Highway and Transport Board, Isle of Man.
- Charles Somerville Wright, Higher Executive Officer, Department of Health and Social Security.
- Miss Sarah Matilda Pettigrew Hemm Wright, Officer-in-Charge, Bushmere House, Birmingham.
- William Wright, Chief Superintendent, Metropolitan Police.
- Alec Winterton York, Officer of Customs and Excise, Board of Customs and Excise.

=== Order of the Companions of Honour (CH) ===
- Jack Ashley, M.P., Member of Parliament for Stoke-on-Trent, South. For services to disabled people.
- The Right Honourable Gerald Austin, Baron Gardiner, Q.C., Chairman of the Council of Justice.
- Professor Max Ferdinand Perutz, C.B.E., F.R.S. For services to Molecular Biology.

=== Royal Red Cross ===
==== Member of the Royal Red Cross (RRC) ====
- Lieutenant-Colonel Gwendoline Rosemary Dawe, A.R.R.C. (408408), Queen Alexandra's Royal Army Nursing Corps.
- Lieutenant-Colonel Muriel Joyce Fleet (425318), Queen Alexandra's Royal Army Nursing Corps, Territorial and Army Volunteer Reserve (now Retired). A.R.R.C.
- Wing Officer Cathrine Jane Grey Gumley (407339), Princess Mary's Royal Air Force Nursing Service, A.R.R.C.

==== Associate of the Royal Red Cross (ARRC) ====
- Miss Barbara Harries, S R.N., S C.M., Superintending Sister, Queen Alexandra's Royal Naval Nursing Service.
- Miss Jean Robertson, Superintending Sister, Queen Alexandra's Royal Naval Nursing Service.
- Captain Maureen June Sloman (482291), Queen Alexandra's Royal Army Nursing Corps.
- Squadron Officer April Anne Reed (407351), Princess Mary's Royal Air Force Nursing Service.

=== Air Force Cross ===
- Lieutenant Commander Alan MacGregor, Royal Navy.
- Wing Commander Peter Charles Vangucci (2466647), Royal Air Force.
- Acting Wing Commander David Garth Lucas (607751), Royal Air Force.
- Squadron Leader Olaf William Alderson (4049157), Royal Air Force.
- Squadron Leader Donald Currie Ferguson (3511197), Royal Air Force.
- Squadron Leader John Andrew Horsfall (4185464), Royal Air Force.
- Squadron Leader John Francis Skane Martin (2617371), Royal Air Force.
- Squadron Leader Trevor Nattrass (4230802) Royal Air Force.
- Squadron Leader Thomas Chalmers Porteous (607931), Royal Air Force.
- Acting Squadron Leader Kenneth Peter Orme (2619273), Royal Air Force.
- Flight Lieutenant John Raymond Asa Whitney (4232168), Royal Air Force.

=== Queen's Police Medal (QPM) ===
ENGLAND AND WALES

- John Henry Gerrard, O.B.E., M.C., Deputy Assistant Commissioner, Metropolitan Police.
- Gilbert James Kelland, Deputy Assistant Commissioner, Metropolitan Police.
- Stanley Ernest Bailey, Deputy Chief Constable, Staffordshire Police.
- Edward Coppin, Deputy Chief Constable, Gloucestershire Constabulary.
- Ronald Nigel Joyce, Assistant Chief Constable, Humberside Police.
- Sydney Clifford Pearson, Assistant Chief Constable, Lincolnshire Police.
- Eric Anfield Tiplady, D.S.C.*, Assistant Chief Constable, Sussex Police.
- Raymon Harry Anning, Commander, Metropolitan Police
- John Arthur Lock, Commander, Metropolitan Police.
- Thomas Beardsworth, Chief Superintendent, Lancashire Constabulary.
- Joan Muriel HUNT, Chief Superintendent, Cheshire Constabulary —seconded as Staff Officer to the Assistant Inspector of Constabulary.
- Hubert George Keith Longhurst, Chief Superintendent, West Midlands Police.
- David Leslie Noble, Chief Superintendent, West Yorkshire Police.
- Brian Arthur George Rowland, Chief Superintendent, City of London Police.

NORTHERN IRELAND

- John Finlay, Sergeant, Royal Ulster Constabulary.

SCOTLAND

- John Farquharson, Chief Constable, Angus Constabulary.
- David Blackstock McNee, Chief Constable, City of Glasgow Police Force.

BRITISH RAILWAYS BOARD

- Lionel Howard Bradley, Assistant Chief Constable, British Transport Police.

OVERSEAS TERRITORIES

- Leroy Maxwell Clark, C P.M, Commissioner of Police, Bermuda Police Force.
- James Joseph Edward Morrin, C.P.M, Acting Assistant Commissioner of Police, Royal Hong Kong Police Force.

AUSTRALIAN STATES
STATE OF NEW SOUTH WALES

- Frederick Austin Bradstreet, Superintendent, 1st Class, New South Wales Police Force.
- Alan Frederick Clarke, Superintendent, 3rd Class, New South Wales Police Force.
- Herbert Bernard Freeman, Sergeant, 1st Class, New South Wales Police Force.
- Arthur Henry Hancock, Superintendent, 3rd Class, New South Wales Police Force
- Francis Lionel Keirnan, Superintendent, 2nd Class, New South Wales Police Force.
- Herbert Frederick North, Superintendent, 3rd Class, New South Wales Police Force.
- Frederick George Passmore, Inspector, 2nd Class, New South Wales Police Force.
- Victor Keith Taylor, Superintendent, 2nd Class, New South Wales Police Force
- Robert Michael Thomas, Inspector, 1st Class, New South Wales Police Force.
- Mervyn Thomas Wood, Superintendent, 3rd Class, New South Wales Police Force.

STATE OF VICTORIA

- Gregor Allan Cattanach, Inspector, Victoria Police Force.
- Henry Michael Duffy, Chief Superintendent, Victoria Police Force.
- Henry Robert Hutchins, Superintendent, Victoria Police Force.
- Ellis Irvine McDonald, Chief Inspector, Victoria Police Force.
- Norman Sydney Sumpter, Chief Superintendent, Victoria Police Force
- John Osburn Thomas, Inspector, Victoria Police Force.

STATE OF QUEENSLAND

Francis Dunstan Gorman, Inspector, Queensland Police Force.

- Joseph Vincent McCarthy, Superintendent, Queensland Police Force.
- John Joseph Ryan, G.M *, Inspector, Queensland Police Force Clifford
- John Smith, Inspector, Queensland Police Force.

STATE OF SOUTH AUSTRALIA

- Ronald McAulay, Chief Inspector, South Australian Police Force.
- Morrice Henry Humphreys Stanford, Chief Inspector, South Australian Police Force.

STATE OF WESTERN AUSTRALIA

- James Jonathan Sullivan, Superintendent, Western Australian Police Force.

STATE OF TASMANIA

- Eric Vernon Knowles, Commissioner, Tasmania Police Force.
- Lennox Rex Salter, Superintendent, Tasmania Police Force.

=== Queen's Fire Service Medal (QFSM) ===
ENGLAND AND WALES

- Thomas Owen Burn, Assistant Chief Fire Officer, Staffordshire Fire Brigade.
- Robert George Crick, Divisional Officer, Grade I, London Fire Brigade.
- Sidney Burton Jowett, M.B.E., Assistant Chief Fire Officer, Derbyshire Fire Brigade.
- Patrick Watters, Chief Fire Officer, Tyne and Wear Fire Brigade.
- Cecil William Lambert, Assistant Chief Fire Officer, Merseyside Fire Brigade.

=== Colonial Police Medal ===
- Harold Vincent Brown, Superintendent of Police, Royal Hong Kong Police Force.
- Chan Bing-wing, Superintendent of Police, Royal Hong Kong Police Force.
- Chan Man, Chief Inspector of Police, Royal Hong Kong Police Force.
- Cheung Ping-sun, Chief Inspector of Police, Royal Hong Kong Police Force.
- Chung Jack Ah-tong, Divisional Officer (Auxiliary), Hong Kong Auxiliary Fire Services.
- Mahlon Dofai, Assistant Superintendent of Police, British Solomon Islands Police Force.
- Stanislaus Michael Elcock, Divisional Officer, Hong Kong Fire Services.
- Brian Ernest Graves, Chief of Police, British Virgin Islands Police Force.
- Laban Alexander Hughes, Assistant Superintendent of Police, Royal Antigua Police Force.
- Thomas George John, Inspector of Police, St. Helena Police Force.
- Kwong Kin-on, Chief Inspector of Police (Auxiliary), Royal Hong Kong Auxiliary Police Force.
- Lam Ying, Chief Inspector of Police, Royal Hong Kong Police Force.
- Lee Chun-tung, Chief Inspector of Police, Royal Hong Kong Police Force.
- Lo Kwok-tung, Chief Inspector of Police, Royal Hong Kong Police Force.
- Lo Wan-or, Police Sergeant, Royal Hong Kong Police Force.
- Luke Yan-keung, Chief Inspector of Police (Auxiliary), Royal Hong Kong Auxiliary Police Force.
- Mok Lim, Principal Fireman, Hong Kong Fire Services.
- Donald Leslie Philip, Assistant Superintendent of Police, Royal Antigua Police Force.
- Donald Eric Poole, Superintendent of Police, Royal Hong Kong Police Force.
- Edric Kenneth Potter, Assistant Superintendent of Police, Royal Antigua Police Force.
- Anthony John Sirett, Chief Inspector of Police, Royal Hong Kong Police Force.
- So Kwok-wai, Principal Fireman, Hong Kong Fire Services.
- William Spence, Formerly Chief Inspector of Police, Royal Hong Kong Police Force.
- Tam Yuk-tong, Principal Ambulanceman, Hong Kong Fire Services.
- Wan Yip-hung, Station Sergeant (Auxiliary), Royal Hong Kong Auxiliary Police Force.
- Peter John Bagley Wassell, Superintendent of Police, Royal Hong Kong Auxiliary Police Force.
- Wong Yu-wing, Principal Fireman, Hong Kong Fire Services.
- Yu Pun-chak, Superintendent of Police, Royal Hong Kong Police Force.

=== Queen's Commendation for Valuable Service in the Air ===
- Wing Commander Martin Elis Bee, A.F.C. (607744), Royal Air Force.
- Wing Commander Peter George Hearn, A.F.C. (504414), Royal Air Force.
- Squadron Leader Edward Bryan Bywater (3512941), Royal Air Force.
- Squadron Leader Robin Curtis Willis-Fleming (4230224), Royal Air Force.
- Squadron Leader James Nicholas Gillmore (5010498), Royal Air Force.
- Squadron Leader Geoffrey Hugo Arkell-Hardwick (4230359), Royal Air Force.
- Squadron Leader John David Lunt (2617932), Royal Air Force.
- Squadron Leader James Edward Watts-Phillips (2608146), Royal Air Force.
- Squadron Leader John Derek Rust (607981), Royal Air Force.
- Squadron Leader Joseph Kerr Sim (608065), Royal Air Force.
- Flight Lieutenant George David Preston Bain (508320), Royal Air Force.
- Flight Lieutenant Thomas Eeles (608251), Royal Air Force.
- Flight Lieutenant David Johnson Fisher (608677), Royal Air Force.
- Flight Lieutenant Michael James Fletcher (3138527), Royal Air Force.
- Flight Lieutenant Jonathan Barratt Hill (608427), Royal Air Force.
- Flight Lieutenant Martin Anthony Johnson (607902), Royal Air Force (for services with the Singapore Armed Forces).
- Flight Lieutenant John Moir McCallum, A.F.C. (191382), Royal Air Force (Retired).
- Flight Lieutenant William Frederick John Pike (3119456), Royal Air Force.
- Flight Lieutenant Ian Reilly (608491), Royal Air Force.
- Flight Lieutenant Julien Saker (4098256), Royal Air Force.
- Flight Lieutenant Alexander Campbell Sneddon (4231960), Royal Air Force.
- Master Air Electronics Operator James Philip Condie (HO5 88309), Royal Air Force.
- BO593425 Flight Sergeant Peter Mornington Wentworth, Royal Air Force.
- Frederick John Clawson, Flight Purser, 747s (Overseas Division), British Airways.
- John Hawkes, Manager (Standards), British Caledonian Airways Ltd.
- Alexander Frederick George Mills, Chief Flight Engineer, British Caledonian Airways Ltd.
- Gerald William Moore, Fleet Manager BAG 1–11, British Caledonian Airways Ltd.
- Charles Ross Pleasance, Senior Captain First Class (European Division), British Airways.

== Papua New Guinea ==
Honours in respect of Papua New Guinea were awarded on the advice of Her Majesty's Australian Ministers.

=== Order of the British Empire ===
==== Knight Commander of the Order of the British Empire (KBE) ====
- Albert Maori Kiki, M.H.A., Minister for Defence, Foreign Relations and Trade. For long and distinguished public service to Papua, New Guinea.

==== Commander of the Order of the British Empire (CBE) ====
- Julius Chan, M.H.A., Minister for Finance. For dedicated public service to Papua, New Guinea.
- Sere Pitoi, Chairman of the Public Service Board. For dedicated public service to Papua, New Guinea.

==== Officer of the Order of the British Empire (OBE) ====
- Miss Lucy Blanche Biggs, Medical Missionary. For services to the people of Papua, New Guinea.
- Miss Violet Baron Bignold, formerly Senior Health Matron. For services to the people of Papua, New Guinea, in the field of maternal and child health care.
- Kaibelt Diria, M.H.A., Minister for Communications. For services to the community and communications within Papua, New Guinea.

==== Member of the Order of the British Empire (MBE) ====
- Edric Eupu, Chairman of the Area Authority, Member of the Land Board, Liquor Licensing Commissioner. For public service to the people of Papua New Guinea.
- Siwi Kurondo, President, Chimbu Area Authority and Kerowagi Local Government Council. For services to the development of Papua New Guinea.
- Esau Lakman, President, Central New Ireland Local Government Council. For services to local government and the community in Papua New Guinea.
- Timothy Mack, Foundation member, Apex; Life Member, Red Cross; Foundation Member, Chinese Association. For services to the community in Papua New Guinea.
- Herman Beri Miringi, President, Wewak-But Local Government Council. For services to local government and community development in Papua New Guinea.
- Beibe Moha, Government Interpreter; Vice President, Goroka Branch, Returned Servicemen's League. For public and community services in Papua New Guinea.
- Rupert Tabua, Government Officer. For public and community services in Papua New Guinea.
- Eileen, Mrs. Tom, Member, Central District Education Board. For services to the community and the advancement of women in Papua New Guinea.

=== British Empire Medal (BEM) ===
- Semel Buka, Sergeant Third Class, Royal Papua New Guinea Constabulary.
- Simon Kiha, formerly Clerk, District Office, Arawa, Papua New Guinea.
- Kenneth Nicodemus, Sergeant Third Class, Royal Papua New Guinea Constabulary.
- Tari Toya, Medical Orderly, Angoram, Papua New Guinea.

=== Queen's Police Medal (QPM) ===
- John Donnelley Davis, Deputy Commissioner, Commonwealth of Australia Police Force.
- James Hamilton, O.B.E., Superintendent First Class, Commonwealth of Australia Police Force.
- Colwyn Arthur Parry, Senior Superintendent, Royal Papua New Guinea Constabulary.
- Robert Robertson, Senior Superintendent, Royal Papua New Guinea Constabulary.
- Michael Samo, Senior Superintendent, Royal Papua New Guinea Constabulary.
- Allan James Watt, Superintendent First Class. Commonwealth of Australia Police Force.

== Mauritius ==
=== Knight Bachelor ===
- Veerasamy Ringadoo, Minister of Finance.

=== Order of the British Empire ===
==== Commander of the Order of the British Empire (CBE) ====
- Marie Antoine Rene Adam. For services in the development of insurance.

==== Officer of the Order of the British Empire (OBE) ====
- Marie Louis Edgard Adolphe. For services to the community and to sport.
- Miss Marie Andree France Boyer de la Gironday For services to the community.
- Egambron Chinappen. For services to the community.
- Siparsad Gumani. For services to the community.
- Idris Korimbocus. For services to the community.
- Permall Soondrum. For services to the community.

==== Member of the Order of the British Empire (MBE) ====
- Daleep Palaram. For services to merchant seamen.
- Hurrychand Parbhoo. For services in connection with Government hospitality.

=== Queen's Police Medal (QPM) ===
- Basdeho Tapesar, C.P.M., lately Assistant Commissioner, Mauritius Police Force.

== Fiji ==
=== Order of the British Empire ===
==== Officer of the Order of the British Empire (OBE) ====
- Lavinia Beulah, Mrs. Ah Koy, Clerk to Parliament.
- Senator Ratu Apakuki Nanovo. For public services.

==== Member of the Order of the British Empire (MBE) ====
Military Division

- Epeli Rayawa Ravovo, Warrant Officer Class I, Drum Major of the Band of the Royal Fiji Military Forces.

Civil Division

- Abel Nagan. For services to the community.
- Taniela Kau Raumakita, Deputy Principal, Navuso Agricultural School.
- Kupp Swami, Chief Commissioner of Scouts in Fiji.

=== British Empire Medal (BEM) ===
- Livai Tabucala. For services to village housing and planning.

=== Queen's Police Medal (QPM) ===
- William Wallace Thomas Caldwell, C.P.M., Deputy Commissioner, Royal Fiji Police.
- Ian Colquhoun Clow, C.P.M., Senior Superintendent, Royal Fiji Police.

== Grenada ==
=== Order of the British Empire ===
==== Commander of the Order of the British Empire (CBE) ====
Civil Division

- Wilbert Everard Douglas. For services to the community.

==== Officer of the Order of the British Empire (OBE) ====
Civil Division

- Nicholas Alexander Brathwaite, Chief Education Officer.
- Walter Eden St. John. For services to the community.

==== Member of the Order of the British Empire (MBE) ====
Civil Division

- Miss Irva Merle Baptists. For services to education.
- Milton Matthew John, Agricultural Assistant, Ministry of Agriculture.
- Joseph Augustus Pitt. For services to arts and crafts and the community.
