= Leonard Small =

Scottish author, footballer and minister

The Very Reverend Leonard Small CBE
- Moderator of the General Assembly
- Church: Church of Scotland
- In office: 1966 to 1967
- Predecessor: Archibald Watt
- Successor: W. Roy Sanderson
- Other post: Minister of St Cuthbert's Church, Edinburgh (1958–1975)

Orders
- Ordination: 1931

Personal details
- Born: Robert Leonard Small; 12 May 1905
- Died: 8 April 1994 (aged 88)
- Denomination: Presbyterianism

Robert Leonard Small, CBE (12 May 1905 – 8 April 1994), was a Scottish author, footballer, and senior Church of Scotland minister. He served as Moderator of the General Assembly from 1966 to 1967.

== Early life and education ==
Small was born on 12 May 1905 in North Berwick, East Lothian, Scotland. He was educated at North Berwick High School, the state secondary school in his home town. He studied classics at the University of Edinburgh and theology at New College, Edinburgh.

== Career ==
=== Ordained ministry ===
Small was ordained into the Church of Scotland (the Kirk) in 1931. From 1931 to 1935, he was minister of St John's Church, Bathgate, West Lothian. He then translated to West High Church, Kilmarnock, East Ayrshire, where he was a minister from 1935 to 1944. The latter part of this ministry coincided with World War II. He served for a period in mainland Europe with the Church of Scotland's "Huts and Canteens" organisation. In 1940, he was serving as a chaplain in France when the British Expeditionary Force was evacuated from Dunkirk; he left the country via Saint-Nazaire and narrowly avoided travelling on the doomed RMS Lancastria.

From 1944 to 1956, he was minister of Cramond Church, Edinburgh. He maintained a link with his war work as Convener of the Committee on Huts and Canteens for HM Forces from 1946 to 1958. He then translated to St Cuthbert's Church, Edinburgh, a much larger church. During this period of ministry he continued to be involved in management of the Kirk: he was Convener of the Committee on Temperance and Morals from 1958 to 1963, Convener of the Social and Moral Welfare Board 1963 to 1964, and Convener of the Stewardship and Budget Committee from 1964 to 1969. He rose to be head of the Kirk as Moderator of the General Assembly from 1966 to 1967. After his term as Moderator, he was appointed Chaplain to the Queen in Scotland and continued as minister of St Cuthbert's Church, Edinburgh.

He retired from full-time ministry in 1975 and was appointed Extra Chaplain to the Queen.

=== Football career ===
Small, a goalkeeper, was captain of the football team while studying at Edinburgh University and joined Scottish Second Division side St. Bernard's after he graduated. He was capped by Scotland at amateur level in 1929.

== Honours ==
He was made Commander of the Order of the British Empire in the 1975 New Year Honours.

== Selected works ==
- Small, R. Leonard (1960). With Ardour And Accuracy – The Warrack Lectures on Preaching 1959. Saint Andrew Press.
- Small, R. Leonard (1963). No Uncertain Sound. Edinburgh: T&T Clark.
- Small, R. Leonard (1966). No Other Name. Edinburgh: T&T Clark. ISBN 0567022579.
- Small, R. Leonard (1993). The holy goalie: formerly minister of St. Cuthbert's Parish Church, Edinburgh. Edinburgh: The Pentland Press. ISBN 1858210372.
