= John Nightingale (police officer) =

British police officer (1913–2002)

Sir John Cyprian Nightingale (16 September 1913 – 1 October 2002) was a British police officer who rose to be chief constable of Essex Constabulary.

He was born in Brixton, London, but after the death of his mother in the 1918 influenza epidemic went to live with other family members in South London. He was educated at the Roman Catholic Cardinal Vaughan School in Kensington and University College, London, where he gained a degree in the Classics.

In 1935, he joined the Metropolitan Police as a constable and was selected to go the Metropolitan Police College at Hendon for training as an officer, after which he was appointed junior station inspector. Promoted to station inspector at Chelsea Police Station he was awarded the British Empire Medal for Bravery in October 1941 for rescuing a man trapped in a bombed building. From 1943 to 1945, he served in an anti-submarine ship in the Western Approaches.

After the war he returned to his career with the Metropolitan Police and was made chief inspector in March 1948. From 1950 to 1953 he served as a Director of the Police College at Ryton-on-Dunsmore and afterwards as commandant of the Police Training Centre at Eynsham, Oxfordshire. In 1956 he became chief superintendent of 'H' Division which covered London's East End.

In 1958 he was appointed an assistant chief constable for Essex Constabulary and was promoted to chief constable of Essex in 1962 on the retirement of Sir Jonathan Peel, a position he held until his own retirement in 1978. He also served as president of the Association of Chief Police Officers in 1973 and as chairman of the Police Council. In retirement he served as a deputy lieutenant of the County of Essex. He was moved to the retired list upon reaching the mandatory retirement age for that position of 75.

== Honours ==

| Ribbon | Description | Notes |
| | Order of the British Empire (CBE) | Commander; Civil Division; 1970 New Years Honours List |
| | Knight Bachelor (Kt) | 1975 New Years Honours List |
| | British Empire Medal (BEM) | October 1941; For Bravery |
| | Queen's Police Medal (QPM) | 1965 New Years Honours List |
| | Defence Medal | |
| | War Medal | |
| | Police Long Service and Good Conduct Medal | |

He also served as a deputy lieutenant of the County of Essex. This gave him the Post Nominal Letters "DL" for life.

== Private life ==
He married, in 1947, to Patricia Maclaren they lived in the Chief Constable's House at Essex Police headquarters.
