= Peter Garthwaite =

British conservationist (1909–2001)

Peter Fawcett Garthwaite OBE (22 October 1909 – 13 May 2001) was a forester who worked in a wide range of settings – imperial and national, public and private. In his professional life he championed the causes of landscape and wild life conservation alongside the demands of timber production. After starting his career in Burma, Garthwaite served in senior posts with the British Forestry Commission from 1947 to 1970, and was then made president of the Royal Society of Forestry of England, Wales and Northern Ireland from 1972 to 1974.

He was a silviculturist who had an extensive knowledge of trees and forestry practice, but he also recognised the advantages of different silvicultural practices in different circumstances.

== Early life ==
Garthwaite was born in Guisborough, North Yorkshire, on 22 October 1909. His father, who came from Durham, was a land agent who worked for the Earl of Airlie for some years.

Peter and his identical twin Clive, who later became a brigadier in the Royal Artillery, were educated at Wellington College; playing on the same team, they caused some confusion when bowling from either end for the First XI. Peter went on to Brasenose College, Oxford, where he studied in the department of forestry, and won Blues for both cricket and hockey. He married Betty Gorman in 1945 and they had two sons, of whom the elder, Simon, was killed in action with the SAS in Oman in 1974, and a daughter.

== Career ==
Garthwaite's professional life began in Burma in 1931. He already showed a wide range of environmental interests. For Garthwaite, forestry was always part of the spectrum of nature and during his time in Burma he co-edited Smythies's Birds of Burma, which is still a standard work of ornithology, as well as authoring other works.

He worked in Burma until 1947 although his career was interrupted by war service in the Royal Indian Engineers, in which he attained the rank of lieutenant-colonel.

When he returned to Britain, Garthwaite joined the Forestry Commission at a time when its projects were expanding rapidly. He became a district officer first at Dalby Forest in North Yorkshire and then at Kielder Forest in Northumberland.

In the 1960s he reacted strongly against the then-current view of forestry, driven by economics and based on the rigid application of "net discounted revenue" assessments of timber value; he regarded this as short-sighted, and in association with the landscape architect Dame Sylvia Crowe he fought to broaden the Commission's approach to take account of conservation and landscape.

He was saluted for his work on the committee which drafted the 1963 Deer Act, and in 1964 he was appointed the Commission's first conservation officer. He went on to become the Commission's head of forestry management, with responsibilities throughout the country.

After leaving the Commission in 1970, Garthwaite developed a practice as a forestry consultant, and continued to spread his knowledge through specialist journals and personal contact. He was a forestry adviser to the Crown Estate and a patron of the Woodland Trust and Woodland Heritage. Garthwaite became particularly associated with "continuous cover" forestry, which fitted well with his conservationist approach and of which he had seen examples in Europe as well as in Burma. He was appointed OBE in the 1975 New Year Honours.

In 1995 he wrote:

My forestry philosophy has not altered in the 65 years that I have been in practice: it is that wood is a renewable resource, and woodlands and forests should be managed to produce the highest quality timber of which the site is capable; and that as a general rule when trees have reached their prime maturity, they should be felled to live on for many years in such form that their quality dictates; as oak beams supporting the roof of a cathedral; as fine craftsman-made furniture; as a framework for a house.

When he retired he returned to North Yorkshire, where his large woodland garden was filled with many notable trees.
