= Lina Lalandi =

Greek harpsichordist (1920–2012)

Lina Madeleine Lalandi-Emery
- Born: Lina Madeleine Yeleki Kaloyeropoulou; 8 June 1920; Athens, Kingdom of Greece
- Died: 2012 (aged 91–92)
- Education: Athens Conservatoire
- Occupations: Harpsichordist and festival organiser
- Known for: the English Bach Festival
- Spouse(s): Mr Waller-Bridge, Ralph Emery
- Partner: Ralph Emery

Lina Lalandi OBE or Lina Madeleine Lalandi-Emery (born Lina Madeleine Yeleki Kaloyeropoulou on 8 June 1920 – 2012) was a Greek harpsichordist and singer known for founding and directing the English Bach Festival.

== Life ==
Lalandi-Emery was born in Athens on 13 July 1920, a date she tried to keep secret. Her father Nikolas Kaloyeropoulos was the director of the Byzantine Museum in Athens. She was trained at the Athens Conservatoire.

She first came to notice when she was recognised for guiding allied troops through Athens during the Second World War.

In 1946 Lina married Cyprian Chando Richard Waller-Bridge (the paternal grandfather of actress and writer Phoebe Waller-Bridge) in Athens. Cyprian died in 1960. In 1962 Lina changed her name to Lina Madeleine Lalandi-Emery, as at that time she was in a relationship with a banker named Ralph Emery who was already married. Emery's wife refused to grant him a divorce, but Lina enjoyed the benefits of her new partner's wealth. It is estimated that he paid two million pounds, over the years, to subsidise the English Bach Festival, which began in 1963 with Lalandi and Jack Westrup as its joint artistic directors. The festival was originally based in Oxford but in time it moved to London. It had Bach as a theme; Lalandi wrote in 1963 that the festival would also include "20th-century composers whose way of thinking is nearer to [Bach's] than to that of the Romantic age." In 1965 she is credited appearing in "The Coach Travellers", a BTF film promoting coach travel, playing a dual manual harpsichord at the Sheldonian Concert Hall.

In 1971 Jack Westrup was no longer a joint artistic director and Lalandi held the post on her own.

In the 1975 New Year Honours, she was appointed an Officer of the Order of the British Empire for her work with the English Bach Festival.

In 1979 she received the French Ordre des Arts et des Lettres. She also had two awards from the Greek government.
