= Ronald McIntosh =

British civil servant and author (1919–2019)

Sir Ronald McIntosh

Director-General of the National Economic Development Office
- In office 1973–1978

Personal details
- Born: Ronald Robert Duncan McIntosh; 26 September 1919 Whitehaven, Cumberland, England
- Died: 1 April 2019 (aged 99) Ashford, Kent, England
- Spouse: Doreen McGinty (m. 1951; died 2009)
- Education: Balliol College, Oxford
- Occupation: Civil servant

Sir Ronald Robert Duncan McIntosh (26 September 1919 – 1 April 2019) was a British civil servant and author. From 1973 until 1978 he was director-general of the National Economic Development Office (NEDO) of the National Economic Development Council (NEDC).

== Background ==
McIntosh was born in Whitehaven on 26 September 1919, to Scottish parents, and grew up in Harrow, Middlesex. He was educated at Balliol College, Oxford, where he became friends with Roy Jenkins. McIntosh went on to serve in the Merchant Navy during World War II.

== Career ==
McIntosh joined the civil service in 1947. He worked in New Delhi for a period in the late 1950s, joined the Department for Economic Affairs in 1964, and became director-general of NEDO in 1973.

On 30 May 1975 NEDO published a report titled Finance for Investment, which rejected state intervention in industrial investment and instead advocated reforms in taxation to divert savings into industry. In September 1975 McIntosh called for a five-year plan for industry to solve the economic recession, and in January 1976 he advocated modernisation grants to the engineering industry to encourage investment. He delivered a speech in November 1976 in which he supported an austerity programme to end the economic crisis, which was condemned by the Trades Union Congress. In the same month McIntosh criticised the political parties for their "quaint and out of date concepts of adversary politics", which would not be able to solve the country's failing economy, and instead advocated co-operation between parties.

In January 1977 McIntosh called for import controls to protect certain domestic industries, such as electronics. He was also in favour of a formal link between NEDO and Parliament, which he advocated in a speech to the Bow Group in March 1977. In 1978 he retired as director-general of NEDO and said "over the years incomes policies have not on balance brought any net benefit to this country and may indeed—through their effect on industrial relations and incentives—have done more harm than good."

After he retired he accepted an executive directorship with the investment bank S. G. Warburg & Co., and was chairman of APV plc. He had retired from both of these roles by 1990.

== Personal life and death ==
In 1951, McIntosh married civil servant Doreen McGinty. She was Catholic, and McIntosh converted to Catholicism. She died in 2009.

McIntosh died at William Harvey Hospital in Ashford, Kent, on 1 April 2019, at the age of 99. He lived in Throwley, Kent.

== Works ==
- Challenge to Democracy: Politics, Trade Union Power and Economic Failure in the 1970s (London: Politico's, 2006). ISBN 1842751573
- Turbulent Times: The Memoirs of Ronald McIntosh (London: Biteback, 2014). ISBN 1849548048
