= Derek Pritchard, Baron Pritchard =

British manager (1910–1995)

Derek Wilbraham Pritchard, Baron Pritchard (8 June 1910 – 18 October 1995) was a British businessman and life peer.

== Biography ==
Pritchard was knighted in 1968 and appointed a life peer in the 1975 New Year Honours. He was duly created Baron Pritchard, of West Haddon in Northamptonshire on 30 January 1975. At that time he was Chairman of Rothmans International Ltd. and President of the Institute of Directors.
