= Jack Westrup =

British musicologist (1904–1975)

Portrait by Howard Coster, 1959

Sir Jack Allan Westrup (26 July 1904 – 21 April 1975) was an English musicologist, writer, teacher and occasional conductor and composer.

== Biography ==
Jack Allan Westrup was the second of the three sons of George Westrup, insurance clerk, of Dulwich, and his wife, Harriet Sophia née Allan. He was educated at Dulwich College, London 1917–22, and at Balliol College, Oxford. He first read classics in which he gained first class honours in moderations (1924) and second class honours in literae humaniores (1926). He gained his B.Mus. degree in 1926, and a Master of Arts in 1929. He took an active part in music in the university as a keyboard and brass player. With an Italian expatriate Arundel del Re, he co-founded the Oxford University Opera Club while still an undergraduate, and was later its conductor. The club had a policy of producing works in English and used its funds to hire professional singers and conductors. In 1925, with William Henry Harris, he staged the first complete performance in modern times of Claudio Monteverdi's opera L'Orfeo (but only over certain obstacles presented by Sir Hugh Allen), and in 1927 he produced the first British performance of Monteverdi's L'incoronazione di Poppea. (In February 1975 he was present at a new production of Orfeo to celebrate the 50th anniversary of the University Opera Club.)

He was a music critic for The Daily Telegraph 1934–39, and also editor of the Monthly Musical Record 1933–45. From 1959 to 1976 he was editor of Music and Letters (Oxford University Press).

He gave classes at the Royal Academy of Music in London 1938–40. He was lecturer in music at King's College, Newcastle upon Tyne 1941–44, the Peyton and Barber Professor of Music at the University of Birmingham 1944–47, and Wadham College, Oxford 1947–71, where he held the Heather professorship. His students there included Joseph Horowitz, Alan Blyth and many others.

In 1947 he was named chairman of the editorial board of the Oxford History of Western Music. In 1950 Oxford University allowed music to become an honours course for the first time, and Westrup was mainly instrumental in designing a new syllabus which demanded a wider knowledge of musical scholarship than the old B.Mus. That same year he conducted an edited version of Hector Berlioz's The Trojans with the Oxford University Opera Club, some passages from which were (non-commercially) recorded. In 1951 he was a co-founder and trustee of Musica Britannica, an authoritative national collection of British music. In 1952 he revised Ernest Walker's History of Music in England. In 1959 he succeeded Eric Blom as editor of Music & Letters. He was president of the Royal Musical Association 1958–63, the Incorporated Society of Musicians 1963, and the Royal College of Organists 1964–66. From 1963 to 1971 he was joint artistic director of the English Bach Festival with its founder Lina Lalandi. The festival was originally in Oxford but in time it moved to London. He conducted the Oxford Opera Club 1947–62, the Oxford University Orchestra 1954–63, and the Oxford Bach Choir and Oxford Orchestra Society 1970–71.

In 1966 he was one of the first advisers to Répertoire International de Littérature Musicale (RILM).

Westrup died in 1975.

His appearance and dress has been described as "deceptively ramshackle". Peter Sculthorpe, on first encountering him at Wadham College, mistook him for a janitor.

== Compositions ==
He wrote a Divertimento in three short movements, for tenor saxophone, cello and piano. He also arranged a number of chorales by Johann Sebastian Bach for two pianos.

== Honours ==
In 1946 Westrup received an honorary degree of D.Mus. from Oxford University. He was knighted in 1961. His collection of 4,500 books on music history and musicology became the basis of the Westrup Library at the Guildhall School of Music and Drama. Music & Letters now awards a Jack Westrup Prize in Musicology.

== Writings ==
- Purcell (1937; part of the Master Musicians series; 4th edition, revised, 1980)
- Handel (1938)
- Liszt (1940)
- Sharps and Flats (1940)
- British Music (1943; 3rd edition, 1949)
- The Meaning of Musical History (1946)
- An Introduction to Musical History (1955)
- Music: Its Past and Its Present (Washington, D.C., 1964)
- Bach Cantatas (1966)
- Schubert Chamber Music (1969)
- Musical Interpretation (1971)

== Sources ==
- bach-cantatas
