= William Tyree =

Australian engineer and businessman

Sir Alfred William Tyree OBE (4 November 1921 – 25 October 2013) was an Australian engineer and businessman, recognized for his impact on the Australian engineering, manufacturing and power industries.

== Life ==
Tyree was born in Auckland, New Zealand on 4th November 1921, to John Victor Tyree and Aggie Heseltine Burrow. He obtained a Diploma of Electrical Engineering at Sydney Technical College. He established Tyree Holdings, a manufacturer of electrical transformers. By the early 1960s he was the largest manufacturer of transformers in the southern hemisphere. In 1969, he sold the business to Westinghouse Electric Company. Tyree left manufacturing and pursued philanthropic and humanitarian interests. He returned to manufacturing, founding the Tyree Group of Companies.

Tyree was described as an engineering dynamo. In a six-decade career, he led the way in Australian electrical transformer manufacture and created the modern energy landscape. He was an advocate for nuclear energy, working on it with Westinghouse. He died in 2013, in his 92nd year.

== Honours ==
In the 1971 Birthday Honours, he was appointed Officer of the Most Excellent Order of the British Empire "for philanthropic services". He was knighted in the 1975 New Year Honours "for services to the community".

In 2001, he was awarded the Centenary Medal.
