= Clive Garthwaite =

English cricketer and British Army officer

Personal information
- Full name: Clive Charlton Garthwaite
- Born: 22 October 1909; Guisborough, Yorkshire, England
- Died: 20 January 1979 (aged 69); Aylesbury, Buckinghamshire, England
- Batting: Unknown
- Bowling: Right-arm medium
- Relatives: Peter Garthwaite (twin-brother)

Career statistics
Competition	First-class
Matches	1
Runs scored	7
Batting average	3.50
100s/50s	–/–
Top score	7
Balls bowled	30
Wickets	0
Bowling average	–
5 wickets in innings	–
10 wickets in match	–
Best bowling	–
Catches/stumpings	–/–
- Source: Cricinfo, 9 January 2019

Clive Charlton Garthwaite CBE (22 October 1909 – 20 January 1979) was an English first-class cricketer and British Army officer. He played one first-class game for the British Army cricket team in 1930. Garthwaite served in North Africa during the Second World War and was mentioned in dispatches in March 1945. He continued to be active in cricket, captaining the Army and Combined Services cricket teams into the 1950s. He retired as a Brigadier in 1963.

== Early life and career ==
Born at Guisborough, his father was a land agent from County Durham who worked for the Earl of Airlie. He attended Wellington College with his identical twin-brother Peter. The brothers both played for the school cricket team and caused some confusion due to their similar looks. After completing his schooling Garthwaite attended the Royal Military Academy, Woolwich. He graduated from the academy in August 1929 and entered into the Royal Artillery as a second lieutenant. He played first-class cricket for the British Army cricket team in 1930, making one appearance against the Royal Air Force at The Oval. Garthwaite batted twice during the match, being dismissed without scoring by Reginald Fulljames in the Army's first-innings, with the same bowler dismissing him for 7 runs in their second-innings.

Garthwaite served at the Shorncliffe Garrison in 1931. He was promoted to the rank of lieutenant in August 1932, with promotion to captain six years later in August 1938. During this period he served overseas in Hong Kong. Garthwaite was appointed adjutant on 1 April 1939 and was seconded from the Royal Artillery the next month.

== WWII and later career ==
He served in World War II, commanding the Royal Artillery's 43rd Battery in North Africa, and was mentioned in dispatches in March 1945. Following the war, he was promoted to the rank of major in June 1946. In February 1952 he was promoted to the rank of lieutenant colonel and served in the garrison at Shoeburyness. During this time Garthwaite remained active in army cricket. In 1953 he was looking for new team members and was able to persuade Warwickshire county player Tom Cartwright to join the Royal Artillery when his National Service call-up came through. This was despite Cartwright's preference for his county regiment, the Royal Warwickshires, and interest from the Royal Air Force. Cartwright would later play in the Army and Combined Services teams captained by Garthwaite. Garthwaite served as chairman of the Royal Artillery Cricket Club in 1955, 1956, 1961 and 1962.

In June 1958 he was promoted to the rank of brigadier. He served as an aide-de-camp to Elizabeth II and was made a CBE in the 1961 New Year Honours. Garthwaite then served as commander of the garrison at the Royal Artillery Barracks. He retired from the military in February 1963 and ceased to be liable for recall in the reserves on reaching his 68th birthday.

During his retirement he ran a business from his home at Larkfield, Kent. He died at Aylesbury in January 1979.
