= Ken Goodwin (RAF officer) =

Royal Air Force officer

Air Commodore Kenneth Joseph Goodwin CBE AFC was a British pilot who was the commanding officer of No. 74 Squadron RAF from 1966 to 1969 and a former Air Officer Commanding Air Cadets and Commandant Air Training Corps from 1979 to 1982.
