= Reginald Booth Stockdale =

British Army general

Major-General Reginald Booth Stockdale CB CMG OBE FIMechE
- Born: 12 January 1908; Port Louis, Mauritius
- Died: 12 April 1979 (aged 71); Salisbury, Wilts
- Military career
- Allegiance: United Kingdom
- Branch: British Army
- Rank: Major-General
- Awards: CB CMG OBE

Major-General Reginald Booth Stockdale CB CMG OBE FIMechE (12 January 1908 – 12 April 1979) was Colonel Commandant of the Royal Electrical and Mechanical Engineers between 1963 and 1968.

== Career ==
Reginald Booth Stockdale was born In Port Louis, Mauritius on 12 January 1908, the son of Reginald Hind Stockdale of Preston, Lancashire. He was educated by Loretto nuns in Mauritius and at Bedford Modern School.

Stockdale began his career in 1931 as a lieutenant in the Royal Army Ordnance Corps. During World War II he served with the British Expeditionary Force (1939–40) and was at home (1940–42). He transferred to Royal Electrical and Mechanical Engineers as a major in 1942. He served in East Africa between 1946 and 1948 where he was promoted to lieutenant-colonel. He was promoted colonel in 1951.

Stockdale was with the British Army of the Rhine between 1952 and 1953, was deputy director of mechanical engineering in Southern Command between 1953 and 1956, and was DEME, BAOR between 1956 and 1959. He was promoted to brigadier in 1958 and major-general in 1960. Between 1960 and 1963 he was Commandant, Technical Group, REME, and its colonel commandant between 1963 and 1968.

In 1963, on retirement from the Army, Stockdale was appointed Inspector of the Arms Control Agency of Western European Union (WEU) in Paris and held this appointment until 1974.

Stockdale was made OBE in 1945, CB in 1963 and CMG in 1975.

== Family life ==
Stockdale was a member of the Army and Navy Club. On 20 June 1940, Stockdale married Betty Celia Tucker, daughter of William Alexander Tucker of Bromley, Kent. They had two sons and a daughter. Stockdale died on 12 April 1979.

Stockdale spoke fluent French learnt during his upbringing in Mauritius. He was a keen rugby player and in later years a referee. He was a gardener and he also had an interest in meteorology and sundials. Known as ‘Stockie’ by his colleagues and ‘Rex’ by his family, he never used his given names.

There is a photographic portrait of Stockdale at the National Portrait Gallery.

In 2010 Letters from the Home Front, a collection of Betty Stockdale's letters to her husband during World War 2 was published by the Plant Press (ISBN 9781903257142).
