= Peter Branson =

Royal Navy Rear Admiral (1924 – 2011)

Rear-Admiral Cecil Robert Peter Charles Branson CBE (30 March 1924 – 1 January 2011) was a Royal Navy officer who was Assistant Chief of Naval Staff (Operations) from 1975 until 1977.

Born in Saint-Malo, France, Cecil Robert Peter Charles Branson grew up speaking fluent French and English. He had the rare distinction of being twice torpedoed while under training with the Royal Navy. In 1956, he was given command of the anti-submarine frigate HMS Roebuck and later given command of HMS Rooke, the naval base at Gibraltar. He retired from the Navy in March 1977.
