= John Scott-Taggart =

British wireless officer, electrical engineer (1897–1979)

Wing-Commander John Scott-Taggart OBE MC
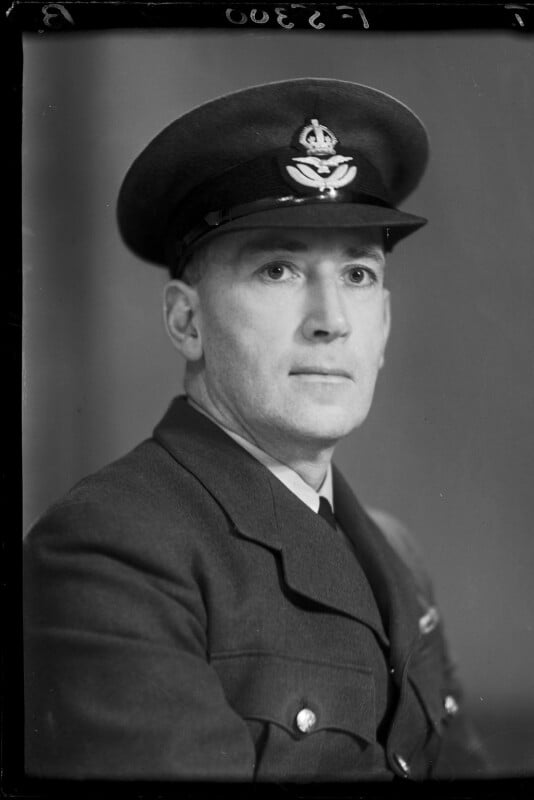
- Scott-Taggart in 1944
- Born: 1897
- Died: 1979 (aged 81–82)
- Engineering career
- Projects: radio sets

Wing-Commander John Scott-Taggart OBE MC (1897 – 1979) was a British radio engineer who served with distinction in both World Wars, applying his technical expertise firstly in radio, and then in radar, to the war efforts. However, he was best known for his work in the inter-war years, where he became a leading writer of magazine articles and books on radio topics, gaining particular notability with the public for the many popular radio sets he designed for the large home constructor market.

== Biography ==
=== Early years ===
Born in 1897, John Scott-Taggart was educated at Bolton School, various technological institutions, King's College London and University College London.

=== First World War ===
On the outbreak of the First World War in 1914, Scott-Taggart enlisted with the 2nd and 4th Seaforth Highlanders even though he had not yet reached the 18 years of age required by the army at that time.

He was initially sent for training, where he passed the exams required to become "First Class Instructor in Signalling". Promoted to Sergeant-Instructor, he stayed on at the Scottish Command School of Signalling where he trained other recruits in army communication techniques. In 1916, he was sent to the Western Front in time for the First Battle of the Somme. Transferred to the Corps of the Royal Engineers in 1917, he worked in the Research Station under Major Rupert Stanley, before receiving his commission and being deployed to a Canadian field gun battery where he participated in the Battle of Vimy Ridge. Having been Wireless Officer to various units, including the 55th (West Lancashire) Division, in late 1917 he was appointed Instructor in Wireless, First Army, Western Front.

In 1918, he was mentioned in despatches, and was later awarded the Military Cross (MC) in connection with his wireless work during a crucial phase of the Battle of the Lys.

Notwithstanding being on active service, Scott-Taggart wrote several of the countless technical articles he would produce during his life whilst serving on the Western Front, the first being published in Wireless World in October 1917.

=== Electronics career ===
Having been demobilised, in the summer of 1919 he joined Ediswan as the head of valve manufacturing at their Ponders End works. In that year he invented the biotron, a negative resistance device. However, in 1920 he left Ediswan for the Radio Communication Company where for four years he was the Head of the Patent Department and a Research Engineer.

In 1922 he founded the Radio Press Ltd., with his employer owing 75% of the stock and himself the remainder. Under his stewardship, the publisher issued a large number of books for the radio enthusiast, firstly those written by Scott-Taggart himself, and latterly by other experts in the field. They also produced a number of journals on the subject, two of which Scott-Taggart edited personally – Modern Wireless (Mar-1923-), and Wireless Weekly (Apr-1923-). It was in the first of these titles that he published the first of a series of radio set designs that made him a household name with wireless constructors throughout the United Kingdom. In addition to his writings for the Radio Press, he wrote a weekly column for the Daily Express.

At the end of 1926, he sold his wireless publication business to the Amalgamated Press. He then read successfully for the Bar, being called up to it in 1928. However, although fully qualified, he never practised as a Barrister. He spent the next four years first learning to fly, then lived life as something a gentleman aviator developing skills that he was able to use in the service of his country during the Second World War.

In 1932 he returned to wireless journalism when he was engaged by Amalgamated Press to work on their stable of magazines for the radio constructor, including two of those he had originally launched. It was in this role that he resumed his series of increasingly successful set designs for the home constructor.

=== Second World War ===
During the Second World War (1939–1945), John:

– Served with RAF in France, 1939–1940
– Staff Officer, Air Ministry, responsible for radar training in RAF, 1940–1941
– Senior Technical Officer, No 73 Wing, responsible for radar stations in most of England and Wales, 1943–1945

=== Later years ===
He was demobilised from RAF in 1945 and was with the Admiralty Signal and Radar Establishment until he retired in 1959. A Fellow of the Institute of Radio Engineers and a Fellow of the American Institute of Electrical Engineers he was awarded OBE in 1975 and died 1979. He was survived by his wife Elizabeth.

== Bibliography ==
"More Practical Valve Circuits"
"Simplified Wireless"
"The Book of Practical Radio (with 163 Diagrams & Plates)"
"The Manual of Modern Radio (With 541 Diagrams & Forty Plates)"
"Thermionic tubes in radio telegraphy and telephony"
"Wireless Valves Simply Explained"
"Thermionic Tubes in Radio Telegraphy and Telephony"
"Elementary Text Book on Wireless Vacuum Tubes"
"HOW TO MAKE YOUR OWN BROADCAST RECEIVER"
