= Rudy Sternberg =

Jewish-British industrialist and farmer

Rudy Sternberg, Baron Plurenden (17 April 1917 – 5 January 1978) was a Jewish-British industrialist and farmer.

== Early life ==
Sternberg was born in Thorn, Germany and educated at the Johanns Gymnasium in Breslau, Germany. He moved to England in 1937, to study chemical engineering at London University. Following the outbreak of war with Germany, Sternberg remained in England as a refugee from Hitler's persecution of the Jews. He joined the British Army in 1939, and was demobilised in 1943 on health grounds. In 1945, he became a naturalised British subject.

== Career ==
In 1948, he founded the Sterling Group to manufacture Bakelite in a disused cotton mill in Stalybridge, Cheshire. The Sterling Group went on to become one of Britain's largest manufacturers of plastics and resins. He also founded Dominion Exports, an import export company and acquired Plurenden Manor, a farming estate in High Halden, Kent.

Sternberg was knighted in the 1970 New Year Honours List, and created a life peer on 28 January 1975 as Baron Plurenden, of Plurenden Manor in the County of Kent.

== Personal life ==
In 1951, Sternberg married Dorothée Monica Prust, a former dancer with the Royal Ballet, who bore him two daughters, Roseanne and Francesca.

Sternberg collapsed and died at Tenerife Airport on 5 January 1978, while returning from holiday.
