= Ronald Gibson =

English physician (1909–1989)

Sir Ronald George Gibson, CBE, FRCS, FRCGP (28 November 1909 – 27 May 1989) was an English physician in Winchester who was knighted in 1975 for services to medicine. Gibson served as Chairman of the Council of the British Medical Association. While Chairman of the Organisation Committee, he championed a Junior Members Forum, and went on to chair the first Forum in June 1958. He also served as Chairman of the Standing Medical Advisory Committee of the Council of the Department of Health and Social Security; a foundation Fellow of the Royal College of General Practitioners; Master of the Society of Apothecaries; Member of the Council of the Royal College of Surgeons; and, Member of the Home Office Advisory Council on the Misuse of Drugs.

During the Second World War, Gibson served in the Royal Army Medical Corps. He was PMO in Italian Somaliland between 1944 and 1945. A lifelong interest in the health care and welfare of adolescents inspired posts at both Winchester College and St Swithun's School, Winchester as medical officer from 1948. In 1984 Sir Ronald founded and became President of The Brendoncare Foundation, a charity dedicated to improving quality of life for older people.
