= English Bach Festival =

Annual classical music festival from 1963 to 2009

The English Bach Festival was an annual UK classical music festival which ran from 1963 to 2009. It was founded by the Greek-born harpsichordist and singer Lina Lalandi (1920–2012) and the English musicologist Jack Westrup who were co-directors during the festival's early years in Oxford.

In 1971, Lalandi became the sole director and the festival was primarily based in London. The festival's early programmes had been largely based on Bach's music—the St John Passion conducted by Karl Richter was a highlight of one of the early festivals. However, from the outset the festival also presented music by modern composers. Lalandi wrote in 1963 that the festival would also include "20th-century composers whose way of thinking is nearer to [Bach's] than to that of the Romantic age." The first festival focused on Bach's early cantatas, including two of his secular cantatas staged in costume, but also presented the world premiere of Nikos Skalkottas's Unaccompanied Violin Sonata. Stravinsky conducted a concert of his own works at the 1964 festival, and the festival went on to present the first UK performances of works by Xenakis, Stockhausen, Ligeti and Messiaen.

By the late 1970s, the EBF had primarily become an international opera company focusing on rarely performed operas of the baroque era which were performed with period instruments, authentic costumes and sets, and singers using historically informed movement and gesture. From 1977 the EBF presented an annual guest night at the Royal Opera House. Amongst the opera performances presented in its final years were Gluck's Telemaco given in both London and Athens in 2003, Rameau's Platée given in Athens in 2006, and Monteverdi's Orfeo given in London in 2007. The last festival performance was Handel's Alceste given at the Banqueting House in London in 2009. The opera had never been performed in Handel's lifetime and had been premiered by the EBF in 1984.
