= Raystede =

English animal sanctuary

- Formation: 1952; 74 years ago
- Type: Charity
- Registration no.: 237696
- Legal status: Charity
- Purpose: Animal rescue, Animal sanctuary
- Headquarters: The Broyle, Ringmer, East Sussex, BN8 5AJ
- Location: East Sussex, United Kingdom
- Website: www.raystede.org
- Formerly called: Raystede Centre for Animal Welfare

Raystede is an animal rescue and sanctuary based in Lewes, East Sussex. They provide rescue, rehabilitation, rehoming and sanctuary to both pets and farm animals.

== History ==
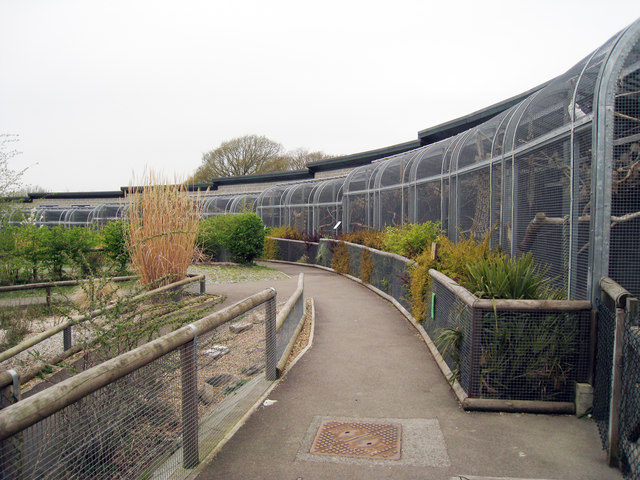
Aviaries at Raystede

Founded by Miss M Raymonde-Hawkins, Raystede began life as a rescue and sanctuary in 1952 in her cottage and back garden. The rescue now covers 43 acres and cares for over 2,000 animals a year and includes a shop and café.

The centre was forced to temporarily close to the general public in 2020 due to the COVID-19 pandemic.

== Raystede on TV ==
In 2019, Channel 4 filmed "Animal Rescue Live" on site at the sanctuary for a week-long series. The show was hosted by Professor Noel Fitzpatrick, Kate Quilton and Steve Jones.
