= National Economic Development Council =

1962–1992 United Kingdom economic planning forum

The National Economic Development Council (NEDC) was an economic planning forum set up in 1962 in the United Kingdom to bring together management, trades unions and government – a form of tripartism – in an attempt to address Britain's relative economic decline. It was supported by the National Economic Development Office (NEDO). Both were known as Neddy. Economic Development Committees (EDCs, known as “Little Neddies”) were set up for particular industries.

Similar bodies had been evolving for a generation. An Economic Advisory Council had been set up in 1930, chaired by the Prime Minister and including leading economists John Maynard Keynes and Josiah Stamp. In 1941 a National Production Advisory Council was set up, chaired by the Chancellor of the Exchequer. In 1947 there was an Economic Planning Board under Sir Edwin Plowden; it included industrialists and civil servants, and on Plowden's retirement in 1953 the Treasury Permanent Secretary took over as chair. In 1957 the Council on Prices, Productivity and Incomes (“the Three Wise Men”) was set up.

NEDC was outlined to the House of Commons in July 1961 by then Chancellor, Selwyn Lloyd, and first met in 1962. It was modelled on the French Economic and Social Council, and it remained an influential player across the 1970s governments of Edward Heath, Harold Wilson and James Callaghan in terms of setting future strategy for UK business and industry, though not in terms of industrial relations. It was headed by a series of consensual industrialists Sir Geoffrey Chandler and Bernard Asher and ex civil servants e.g. John Cassels and one academic Walter Eltis.

Margaret Thatcher distrusted the body and scaled down its meetings from monthly to quarterly - of which the Chancellor only attended one per year. The National Economic Development Council was abolished by John Major in June 1992.

However, within the European Union the United Kingdom was a member of a similar international body, namely the European Union's Economic and Social Committee.

== Book ==
- Dell, Edmund (1997). The Chancellors: A History of the Chancellors of the Exchequer, 1945-90. London: HarperCollins. ISBN 978-0-006-38418-2.
- Dorey, Peter, ed. (1999). The Major Premiership: Politics and Policies under John Major, 1990-97. Basingstoke: Macmillan Press.
